= Glossary of geography terms (A–M) =

This glossary of geography terms is a list of definitions of terms and concepts used in geography and related fields, including Earth science, oceanography, cartography, and human geography, as well as those describing spatial dimension, topographical features, natural resources, and the collection, analysis, and visualization of geographic data. It is split across two articles:

- This page, Glossary of geography terms (A–M), lists terms beginning with the letters A through M.
- Glossary of geography terms (N–Z) lists terms beginning with the letters N through Z.

Related terms may be found in Glossary of geology, Glossary of agriculture, Glossary of environmental science, and Glossary of astronomy.

== A ==
absolute location
The particular location of a point on Earth's surface that can be expressed by a grid reference such as latitude and longitude.
accessibility
A locational characteristic that permits a place to be reached by the efforts of those at other places.
accessibility resource
A naturally emergent landscape form that eases communication between areas.
acculturation
The act of adopting a culture different to your own; usually due to immersion into a dominant group.
acme
See summit.
acre (ac)
A unit of area traditionally defined as the area of a plot of land one chain (66 feet) by one furlong (660 feet), equivalent to 43,560 square feet (0.001563 sq mi; 4,047 m^{2}), or about 0.40 hectare.
active volcano
A volcano that is currently erupting, or one that has erupted within the last 10,000 years (the Holocene) or during recorded history.
adret
The sunny, warm aspect of a hill or mountain, as opposed to the ubac or shady side.
affluent
See tributary.
agricultural geography
A sub-discipline of geography which studies the spatial relationships between humans and agriculture, as well as the cultural, political, and environmental processes that lead to parts of the Earth's surface being transformed into agricultural landscapes through primary sector activities.
alluvial fan
A distinctly triangular or fan-shaped deposit of sediment transported by water, often referred to as alluvium. Alluvial fans usually form at the base of mountains, where high-velocity rivers or streams meet a relatively flat area and lose the energy needed to carry large quantities of sediment, which ultimately spreads out in all available directions. They tend to be larger and more obvious in arid regions.
alluvial plain
A wide, flat, gently sloping plain created by the long-term deposition of alluvium from one or more rivers flowing from highland regions, and typically characterized by various fluvial landforms such as braided streams, terraces, and meanders. Alluvial plains encompass the larger area over which a river's floodplain has shifted through geological time.
alluvial soils
Soils deposited through the action of moving water. These soils lack horizons and are usually highly fertile.
alluvium
Clay, silt, gravel, or similar detrital material deposited by flowing water.
alpine
Characteristic of or resembling the European Alps, or any other high-elevation mountain range or mountainous environment (especially one deeply modified by glacial erosion so as to contain characteristic landforms such as cirques, horns, etc.), in topography, climate, or ecological communities.
altitude
The height of an object in the atmosphere above sea level. The term is sometimes used interchangeably with elevation.
amphidromic point

A geographical location where there is little or no tide, i.e. where the tidal amplitude is zero or nearly zero because the height of sea level does not change appreciably over time (meaning there is no high tide or low tide), and around which a tidal crest circulates once per tidal period (approximately every 12 hours). Tidal amplitude increases, though not uniformly, with distance from these points. Amphidromic points are the consequence of resonance phenomena which occur when obstructing landmasses reflect tidal bulges back and forth across oceanic basins; their precise locations, usually in the open ocean near the center of the basin, depend largely on the surrounding topography and bathymetry, and also vary slightly with winds, currents, and the positions of the Sun and the Moon. There are at least a dozen well-defined amphidromic points across the Earth's oceans.

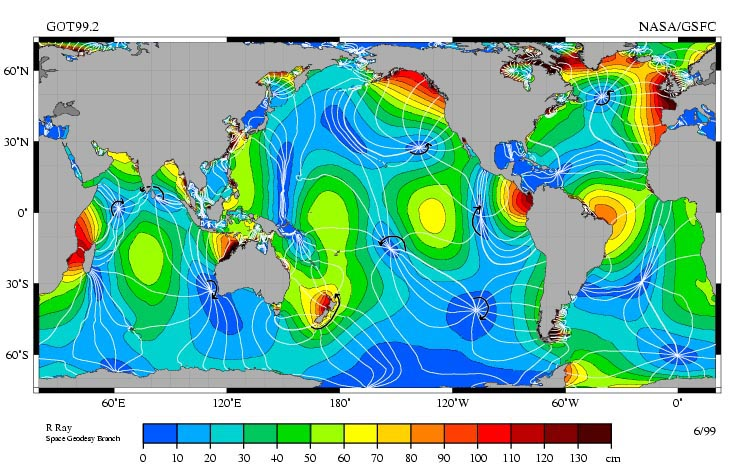
The average difference in the height of sea level between high tide and low tide varies greatly across the Earth's oceans. At places known as amphidromic points (dark blue) – the central points around which tidal bulges circulate twice daily – there is little or no change in sea level, and hence no high tides or low tides.

anastomosing stream

A stream or river composed of multiple, branching, interconnected, coexisting channels that enclose floodbasins on alluvial plains, usually formed when a slow-moving river encounters avulsions that divert its flow, creating new channels on the floodplain.
anecumene

The part of the Earth's surface which is uninhabited and/or uninhabitable by human beings. Contrast ecumene.
angle of repose
The steepest angle of descent or dip, relative to the horizontal plane, at which a mass of loose, freely movable material such as sand or unconsolidated rock debris can remain stationary, i.e. without sliding downward, despite the pull of gravity.
Antarctic
The region of the Earth that is south of the Antarctic Circle.
Antarctic Circle
The southernmost of the Earth's two polar circles of latitude, south of which the sun appears above the horizon for 24 continuous hours at least once per year (and is therefore visible at midnight) and also appears at least partially below the horizon for 24 continuous hours at least once per year (and is therefore not visible at noon). Its latitude is approximately 66°33′47.1″ south of the Equator. Contrast Arctic Circle.
antecedent stream

A stream or other watercourse that existed before the present form of the surrounding land surface was established and which maintains its original course and pattern despite changes in the local geology or topography. For example, a landscape featuring a river with a dendritic drainage pattern may be altered by gradual, localized tectonic uplift, but the river may be sufficiently powerful to erode through the new obstructions as rapidly as they are formed, carving a gorge rather than being redirected, and thereby preserving its dendritic pattern even though it now flows over a landscape that typically produces very different drainage patterns. Compare insequent stream.
anthropization
The conversion of open spaces, landscapes, and natural environments by human action.
anthropogenic
1. Of or relating to anthropogeny, the scientific study of the origins of human beings.
2. Having an origin in human activity; caused by or attributable to humans.
anti-dip stream
A stream flowing in a direction approximately opposite to that of the dip of the underlying surface rocks. It is frequently, though not necessarily, an obsequent stream.
anticline
A geological upfold that has an arch-like convex shape and its oldest beds near its center, often visible at the Earth's surface in exposed rock strata. Contrast syncline.
antimeridian
1. The meridian of longitude that is directly opposite or antipodal to a given meridian, i.e. the imaginary line that is exactly 180 degrees of longitude distant from the given meridian. Together, a meridian and its antimeridian form a great circle that passes through the geographic poles.
2. The 180th meridian in particular, i.e. the meridian of longitude that is exactly 180 degrees both east and west of the Prime Meridian, with which it forms a great circle dividing the Earth into the Eastern and Western Hemispheres. The 180th meridian is used as the approximate basis for the International Date Line because it mostly passes through the open waters of the Pacific Ocean.
antipodes
Any pair of points on the Earth's surface that are diametrically opposite to each other, such that a straight line connecting them would pass through the Earth's center. Such points are as far away from each other as possible, with the great-circle distance between them being approximately 20,000 kilometres (12,000 mi).
anywhere fix
A geographic position which a GPS receiver is able to calculate without requiring information about its own location or the local time.
apogean tide
The tide when the Moon is at its furthest distance from Earth in its orbit (its apogee), during which its gravitational pull is reduced, resulting in a smaller tidal range than is usual, i.e. lower high tides and higher low tides. Contrast perigean tide.
apparent place
The apparent position of an object in space as seen by an observer, which, because of physical and geometric effects, may differ from the object's true position.
applied geography
The application of geographical knowledge and techniques to the solution of economic and social problems on any scale, ranging from local to global, in disciplines such as civic planning, land use and management, location policy, and population studies, among many others.
apposed glacier
A glacier resulting from the merging of two separate glaciers.
apron
A spread of alluvium deposited by streams, especially those originating from a melting glacier. See also alluvial fan and outwash plain.
aquiclude
A normally permeable rock, underlying or overlying an aquifer, which becomes impermeable because of the saturation of its pores by water, potentially creating a confined aquifer.
aquifer

An underground layer of water-bearing permeable rock, rock fractures, or unconsolidated materials such as gravel, sand, or silt, which is sufficiently porous to carry or conduct water yet also sufficiently coarse or non-absorptive to release the water and thereby permit its exposure to or access from the ground surface. Groundwater from aquifers may naturally emerge at the surface, e.g. at a spring, or may be extracted using man-made wells. There are many different types of aquifer with various levels of hydraulic conductivity.

Diagram of multiple aquifers at various depths, showing the water table (dashed line), confining layers, directions of water flow, and groundwater recharge times

aquifuge
An impermeable rock stratum which not only obstructs the passage of water but cannot absorb it, e.g. granite.
aquitard
A bed or layer of rock that slows the conveyance of water from an aquifer due to its low permeability or low hydraulic conductivity.
archipelago

A chain, cluster, or collection of islands in a sea.
arête
A sharp, narrow mountain ridge, often resulting from the erosive activity of alpine glaciers flowing in adjacent valleys.
arroyo

A deep gully cut by a stream that flows only part of the year; a dry gulch. The term is used primarily in desert areas in North America and South America.
Arctic
The region of the Earth that is north of the Arctic Circle.
Arctic Circle
The northernmost of the Earth's two polar circles of latitude, north of which the sun appears above the horizon for 24 continuous hours at least once per year (and is therefore visible at midnight) and also appears at least partially below the horizon for 24 continuous hours at least once per year (and is therefore not fully visible at noon). Its latitude is approximately 66°33′47.1″ north of the Equator. Contrast Antarctic Circle.
ash
Fragments of lava or rock less than 1/3 centimetre (0.13 in) in diameter that have been ejected into the atmosphere by a volcanic explosion.
aspect

The direction toward which a slope faces with respect to a compass or to the Sun's position in the sky, or the direction which a segment of coastline faces as it meets the sea.
assimilation
The process by which the rock forming the wall of a magma chamber in incorporated into the magma itself.
Atlantic Seaboard fall line
The physiographic border between the Piedmont and Atlantic coastal plain regions of eastern North America. The name derives from the river rapids and waterfalls that occur as the water flows from the hard rocks of the higher piedmont onto the softer rocks of the coastal plain.
Atlantic-type coastline
See discordant coastline.
atlas
A bound collection of maps.
atmosphere
The mixture of gases, aerosols, solid particles, and water vapor that envelops the Earth.
atoll
A ring-shaped coral reef that partially or completely encircles a lagoon.
autonomous height
See topographic prominence.
aven
A vertical or inclined shaft connecting a cave passage to the surface.
avulsion
1. The sudden loss of land by the action of water.
2. The rapid abandonment by a river or stream of an existing channel in favor of the formation of a new channel, typically because the new channel follows a steeper or less obstructed course.
awareness space
All of the locations of which an individual is "aware", i.e. about which they have knowledge above some minimum level, even those they may not have actually visited. Awareness space includes activity space, and it enlarges as new locations are discovered and new information is gathered. See also search space and mental map.
axis
1. (coordinate system) Any of the reference lines of a Cartesian coordinate system, from which the signed distances to each coordinate are measured, e.g. the x-axis or the y-axis.
2. (of a fold) The imaginary central line or plane dividing the limbs of the fold as symmetrically as possible; the crest from which strata dip downward and away in an anticline, or the lowest depth of the trough from which strata rise in opposite directions in a syncline.
3. (of the Earth) The rotational axis of the Earth: the diameter between the North Geographic Pole and the South Geographic Pole, passing through the planet's geometric center, around which the Earth rotates anti-clockwise (i.e. to the east) once every 23 hours and 56 minutes. This axis is constantly tilted at an angle of about 66°30' with respect to the plane of the Earth's orbit around the Sun, which is the primary cause of the seasonal weather cycles experienced at temperate and polar latitudes.
ayre
Another name for a shingle beach or other gravel-covered spit, bar, or tombolo, used primarily in the archipelagos of northern Scotland.
azimuth
The angle formed between a reference vector (often magnetic north) and a line from the observer to a point of interest projected perpendicularly to the zenith on the same plane as the reference vector. Azimuth is usually measured in degrees and can be determined with a compass.
azimuthal projection
A map projection in which all bearings are laid off correctly from the centerpoint of the map, so that all points on the map are true in distance and direction from the center.

== B ==
backcountry
Any geographical area that is remote, isolated, undeveloped, or difficult to access, as contrasted with frontcountry; sparsely populated or uninhabited wilderness. See also bush.
backshore
The part of a seashore lying inland from the mean high water line, landwards of the foreshore, from which it is often delineated by a conspicuous strandline. This part of the beach is only affected by waves during exceptional high tides or severe storms.
backslope
The part of the profile of a hillslope that forms the steepest, typically linear portion of the slope, generally located in the middle and bounded by a convex shoulder above and a concave footslope below. The backslope may or may not include vertical or near-vertical cliffs.
backwash
The seaward return flow of a receding wave after it has broken on a beach or other surface. Contrast swash.
backwater
1. A part of a river in which there is little or no current, especially a side channel, a sluggish meander, or a slowing and widening of the main stem created by an obstruction to flow.
2. A place regarded as remote, underdeveloped, or culturally backward relative to other places; a place or state of stagnation, in which little or no economic, social, or intellectual progress occurs.
3. A secluded, peaceful place.
badia
In the Middle East, an arid area characterized by low or irregular precipitation and little or no vegetation.
badlands
An area of rugged or irregular topography resulting from extensive wind and water erosion of unconsolidated sedimentary rock.
bajada

A series of adjacent alluvial fans coalescing in a basin at the foot of a mountain range.
Balkanization
The political fragmentation of a larger region or state into multiple smaller regions or states, often implying mutual hostility or lack of cooperation between such units, as has occurred frequently in the Balkan Peninsula of southeastern Europe.
bank
1. The land alongside a body of water, particularly the sloping ground bordering and defining the channel of a flowing watercourse such as a river or stream.
2. An elevation in the bed of a river, stream, or shallow sea, either fully or partially submerged, mid-channel or connected to the shore, and usually made of sand, mud, gravel, or other loose sediment. See also bar and shoal.
3. Another name for a hill or hillside.
bankfull stage
The stage during which the channel of a river or stream is completely filled with water from bank to bank, immediately preceding the overbank stage, when the river overflows its banks and inundates the surrounding floodplain.
bar
An elevated area of unconsolidated sediment such as sand or gravel which has been deposited by the flow of a river or other moving body of water. See also shoal.
barachois

A shallow coastal lagoon, pond, or estuary that is partially or totally separated from the ocean by a sand, gravel, or shingle bar or spit; or the bar itself, often created at the mouth of a river by the deposition of riverine sediment and longshore drift. The term is primarily used in Atlantic Canada.
barrage
An impoundment built for seasonal floodwater storage and/or to create a reservoir for irrigation, as opposed to a dam, which instead serves the purpose of hydroelectric power generation, though the terms are sometimes used more or less interchangeably.
barrier island
A long, narrow ridge or shoal lying above the highest high tide level (thereby creating an island) and parallel to the mainland coast, from which it is separated by a lagoon. Barrier islands are essentially very large sandbars deposited naturally by wave and tidal action, often in extensive chains along the coastline, or created artificially by dredging. Though their size and shape change frequently, particularly during storms, they are important natural breakwaters, sheltering areas of relatively calm waters where wetlands and marine life flourish. See also spit and tied island.

Diagram of various coastal landforms depicting a barrier island

barrier reef
A coral reef lying parallel to a shore and some distance from it, creating a sheltered lagoon which the reef protects from the open ocean.
barrier ridge
Any steep, unnavigable ridge or escarpment isolating one terrain from another.
barrio
In the Spanish-speaking world, a neighborhood or community within a larger urban area, generally with informal boundaries, though in some places the term may refer to a formal subdivision of a municipality.
barrow
See tumulus.
barysphere
The Earth's core and mantle considered together, i.e. all of the Earth's interior beneath the lithosphere.
base level
The lowest level to which a stream can erode its bed. The ultimate base level of all streams is sea level.
base map
A foundational map layer displaying only the most basic or essential geographic reference information, such as land and water boundaries, administrative borders, and coordinate grids, and serving as an underlying reference layer upon which more specialized or thematic data are compiled or overlaid.
baseline
An accurately measured line of known length and direction on the Earth's surface, used as a reference line in triangulation, trilateration, and other surveying operations.
basin
Another name for a depression, particularly one that is approximately circular, level or nearly level at the bottom, and/or surrounded on all sides by land of uniform elevation.
batholith
A very large body of igneous rock, usually granite, which has been exposed by erosion of the overlying rock.
bathymetry
1. The measurement of water depth, mainly of seas and oceans but sometimes of deep lakes.
2. The study and depiction of the physical features or relief of the floor of a lake or ocean. In this sense bathymetry is considered the underwater equivalent of hypsometry or topography.
bay
A coastal body of water that is directly connected to but recessed from a larger body of water, such as an ocean, sea, lake, or another bay. The land surrounding a bay usually shelters it from strong winds and waves, making bays ideal places for ports and harbors.
bayou
In the southern United States, a sluggish or stagnant slough or backwater, or a marshy outlet of a lake or river.
beach
A landform along the shoreline of an ocean, sea, lake, or river with a loose surface of sand, gravel, shingle, pebbles, shells, stones, or coral.
bearing
The direction or position of an object, or the direction of an object's movement, relative to a fixed point. It is typically measured in degrees and can be determined with a compass. By convention, magnetic north is defined as having a bearing of zero degrees.
bedrock
The solid rock in the Earth's crust that underlies all soil and other loose material; the rock material that breaks down eventually to form soil.
belt

A large region or district (often but not necessarily a broad, elongated area of vague or indeterminate boundaries) identified or associated with one or more particular, distinctive characteristics, e.g. of climate (banana belt), vegetation (Pine Belt), topography (Alpide belt), geology or mineral resources (Lead Belt), agriculture (Corn Belt), land use (green belt), language or ethnicity (Hindi Belt), or social/cultural demographics (Bible Belt). See also regionalism.
bench
A narrow step, shelf, ledge, or terrace, typically backed by a steep slope, produced either naturally (e.g. by erosion, as with a wave-cut bench) or artificially (e.g. by mining).
benchmark
A surveying mark cut or embedded into a durable, fixed material, such as a rock or the wall of a building, for which the height above some designated datum level has been accurately measured.
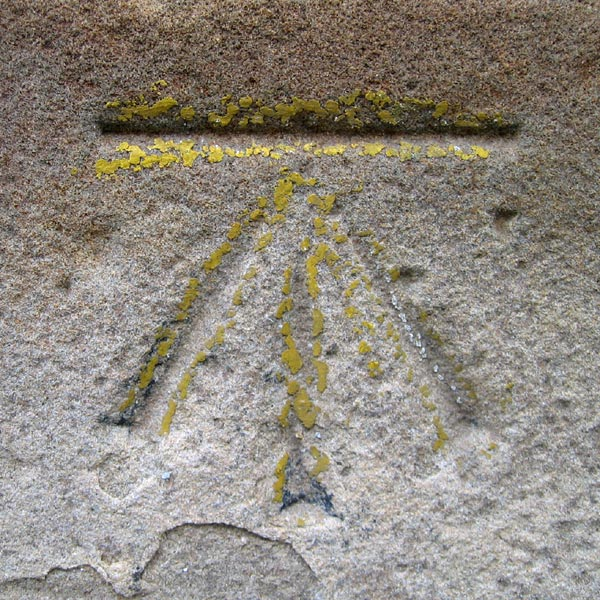
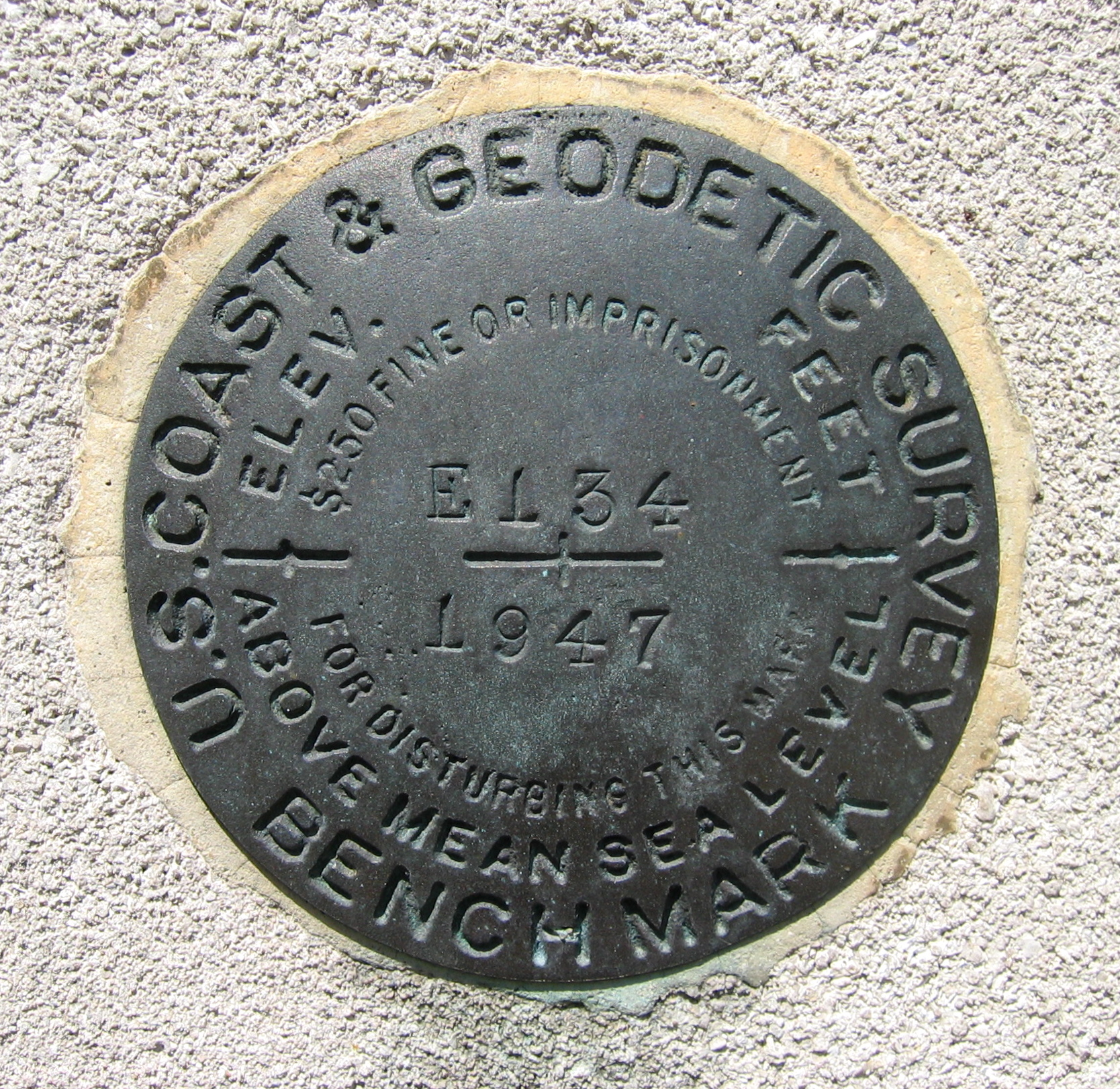
A traditional benchmark of the British Ordnance Survey, consisting of a chiseled arrow indicating a horizontal line (top), and a modern bronze disc benchmark of the United States Coast and Geodetic Survey (bottom)
berg
1. A mountain or hill; a cliff face or precipice.
2. Another name for a bergschrund, iceberg, or inselberg.
bergschrund

A crevasse or series of parallel crevasses that opens in a glacier when a mass of moving ice detaches and pulls away from stagnant ice or firn. Bergschrunds are common in mountainous areas, often forming seasonally near the back of a cirque where the ice meets a steep or rocky headwall. When the rift forms directly between ice and rock, the gap is called a randkluft.
berm
1. A level space, shelf, or raised barrier separating two areas, often man-made and built of compacted earth. Berms often function as impoundments, fortification lines, or border walls and other lines of demarcation.
2. A low, impermanent, nearly horizontal or landward-sloping shelf, bench, or narrow terrace on the backshore of a beach and parallel to the shoreline, formed by waves which deposit material beyond the average high water mark, e.g. during storms. Some beaches have no berms; others may have one or more.
bight
A bend or curve in a coastline, river, or other geographical feature typically indicating an especially large, open bay that is shallower than a sound.
bilateral tolerance
In cartography, an allowable variation in a measured or mapped dimension permitted in both positive and negative directions from a specified nominal value.
billabong
In Australia, a branch of a river that is cut off when the main stem changes course, leaving an elongated and often ephemeral waterhole or oxbow lake.
biogeography
The study of the distribution of biological species and ecosystems in geographic space and through geological time.
biogeosphere
The outer part of the lithosphere, specifically the part which is also part of the biosphere, from the surface of the Earth to the greatest subterranean depths at which organic life can exist.
biological diversity

A concept recognizing the variety of life forms in an area of the Earth and the ecological interdependence of these life forms.
biome
A large ecosystem characterized by a distinct climate, flora, and fauna.
biosphere
The entirety of all biological systems on Earth, integrating all living beings and ecosystems; the realm in which biological organisms live.
biota
The animal and plant life of a region, considered as a total ecological entity.
blackwater
The water of a slow-moving river channel flowing through a forested swamp or wetland, characterized by high concentrations of tannins leached from decaying vegetation, which gives it a darkly stained color and high acidity.
blockfield

A surface of broken, boulder-sized rock fragments found in periglacial or volcanic environments, created in situ by processes other than mass wasting, often by frost weathering in the joints of larger rocks.
blowhole

A hole or fissure, especially a nearly vertical one, that is the landward opening of a sea cave, frequently spouting or spraying air and seawater as waves crash against the cave's seaward opening.
blowout
A sandy depression formed when wind erodes into patches of bare sand on otherwise vegetation-stabilized sand dunes at the margins of coastal and arid ecosystems.
bluff
A steep slope or cliff marking the outer margin of a floodplain, especially one formed as the river erodes the concave bend of a meander. See also cut bank.
bocage
A landscape of mixed woodland and pasture, with fields and winding country lanes sunken between low, narrow ridges and banks surmounted by tall, thick hedgerows, especially as found in rural parts of western Europe.
body of water
Any significant accumulation of water, either natural or artificial, on the surface of the Earth. Bodies of water may hold or contain water, as with lakes and oceans, or they may collect and move water from one place to another, as with rivers, streams, and other watercourses.
bog

A type of wetland which accumulates deposits of dead plant material, especially mosses, known as peat. Bogs occur where water at the ground surface is acidic and low in dissolved nutrients. They are one of four main types of wetland, along with fens, marshes, and swamps.
bootheel
See salient.
border
The geographical boundary of a political entity or legal jurisdiction, such as a country, state, or other subnational entity.
bore
1. (tidal) A steep-fronted wave formed by the convergence of two tidal bulges or by the constriction of an incoming tide as it travels up a river, firth, or narrow bay, temporarily reversing the direction of the current.
2. (hole) A deep, man-made hole or shaft drilled into the ground, e.g. in mining, or for digging a well or tunnel.
bornhardt
A bald, steep-sided, dome-shaped hill, mountain, or rock outcropping at least 30 metres (98 ft) in height and several hundred meters in width. Compare inselberg, tor, and nubbin.
borough
A type of administrative subdivision in certain English-speaking parts of the world. Though traditionally used to refer to a fortress or a walled town, modern usage of the term can variably refer to any town with its own local self-government, a formal or informal subdivision of a large metropolis (as in New York City and London), or an entire administrative region (as in the U.S. state of Alaska).
bottomland
See floodplain.
boulevardization
The replacement of the narrow, congested, winding streets of an older town or neighborhood with wider, more modern streets or boulevards, often according to a carefully plotted grid layout.
boundary
Any line of demarcation, real or imaginary, visible or invisible, natural or artificial, with or without legal significance, which may be perceived from either or both sides of the line, indicating the place at which two or more geographical areas of distinct ownership, administration, legal jurisdiction, or any other quality meet; e.g. a border separating political or administrative divisions, zones of occupation, natural areas, or private and public property. See also frontier.
bourne

A seasonal or intermittent stream flowing from a spring in an otherwise dry valley, and whose flow depends on the level of the water table; or the spring or fount itself. The term is used primarily in the chalklands of southern England. See also winterbourne.
box canyon
A short, narrow canyon with steep walls on three sides, allowing entry and exit only through the mouth of the canyon.
brake
See canebrake.
brash ice
See drift ice.
breadbasket
A region of a country or other polity which supports a large proportion of the country's domestic food production (especially of wheat and other grains) due to its fertile soils, favorable climate, and/or relative accessibility to agricultural interests.
break
1. Any more or less abrupt change in the profile of a slope or hillside.
2. A heavily eroded area along a river featuring steep banks, bluffs, ravines, or gorges. The term is used chiefly in the plural (i.e. breaks) and primarily in the United States and Canada.
breaker
1. Another name for a breaking wave.
2. A reef, shoal, bar, skerry, or area of shallow water against which waves routinely break.
breaker zone
See surf zone.
break-in-bulk point
A transfer point on a transport route where the mode of transport or type of carrier changes and where large-volume shipments are reduced in size. For example, goods may be unloaded from a ship and transferred to trucks at an ocean port.
breaking wave

A wave of water on the surface of an ocean, lake, or other body of water with enough energy that, upon reaching a peak size or velocity, its crest "breaks" or overturns upon itself with a distinct forward curve, with the linear energy transforming into turbulence. Waves tend to break as they enter areas of shallow water, most reliably near shorelines, where the decreasing depth of the sea floor beneath them forces them to grow to a critical height at which point they overturn and the remaining forward energy is dissipated upon the beach as swash, though other forces may also cause breaking, including stormy weather and passing watercraft.
breakwater
Any man-made structure built on the coast of a body of water, typically the sea, in order to reduce the intensity of wave action in an area adjacent to the shore, thereby providing safe harbourage for human activities in the inshore waters. Breakwaters may also be designed to protect the coastline from coastal erosion and longshore drift.
brownfield
Any previously developed area of land that is no longer in use, often with derelict buildings and infrastructure, and in some contexts implying land that has been abandoned because of pollution or contamination. Compare greenfield.
brush
Low-lying, woody, often dense vegetation or plant debris, e.g. scrub; a thicket of small trees and shrubs, or the plant community characterized by vegetation dominated by shrubs.
built environment
The human-made spaces that provide the setting for human activity, in which people live, work, and recreate on a day-to-day basis.
burgh
A type of administrative subdivision in Scotland and northern England, equivalent to a borough.
burn
In parts of the United Kingdom, Australia, and New Zealand, a large stream or a small river. See also bourne.
bush
Wild, undeveloped, or uncultivated land, especially when covered by thick shrubs and vegetation; sparsely populated or uninhabited wilderness. See also backcountry, hinterland, outback, and bushveld.
bushveld

In southern Africa, a tropical or subtropical woodland ecoregion consisting largely of open savanna with scattered trees; wild countryside as opposed to cultivated land.
butte
An isolated hill or mountain with steep or precipitous sides, usually having a smaller summit area than a mesa.
bypass
1. A route which diverges around a place rather than traveling through it, especially a road or footpath built specifically for the purpose of diverting automobile or pedestrian traffic away from areas that are congested, blocked, under construction, or unsafe.
2. See flood bypass.

== C ==
cadastre

A type of parcel-based land recording system containing a comprehensive record of interests in individual units of land within a country or other polity, usually including a geometric description of each parcel's physical location, dimensions, and boundaries that is linked to legal information detailing the nature of the interests (e.g. rights, restrictions, and responsibilities), the ownership or control of those interests, and the economic value of the land and its improvements. The cadastre is a fundamental source of data used in resolving disputes between landowners.
cairn
A man-made stack or mound of rocks, stones, or masonry, usually roughly conical or pyramidal in shape, constructed as a burial mound, to mark a surveyed point, or as a landmark or waypoint to aid routefinding on a route that is otherwise unmarked and difficult to distinguish from the surrounding environment.
calanque
A narrow, steep-sided valley surrounding an inlet formed in karstic regions along the Mediterranean coast, either by fluvial erosion or the collapse of the roof of a cave that has been subsequently partially submerged by a rise in sea level.
caldera
A very large cauldron-shaped depression of volcanic origin which forms through the subsidence and collapse of the ground surface following the evacuation of an underlying magma chamber. See also volcanic crater.

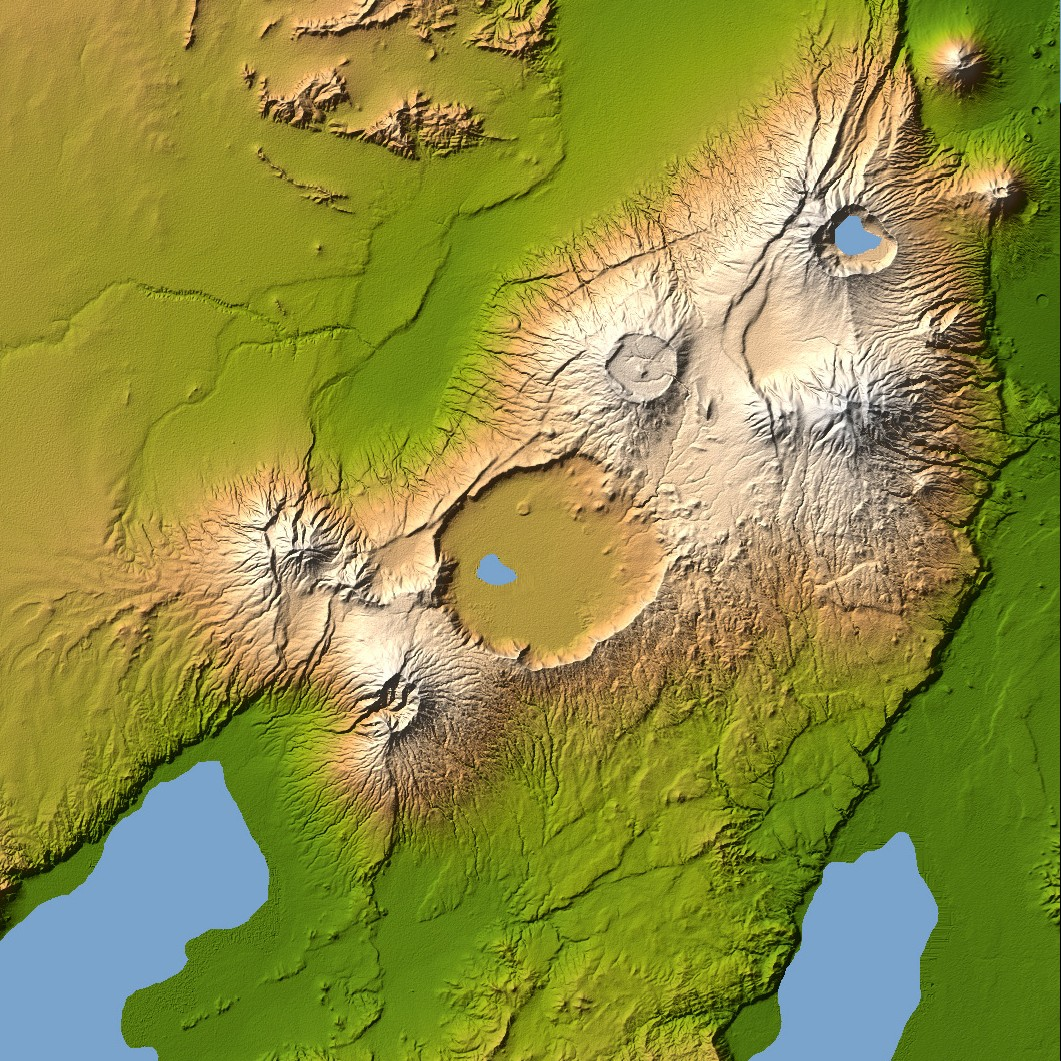
A topographic map of Ngorongoro Crater in northern Tanzania, the world's largest inactive, intact, and unfilled volcanic caldera, which formed when an immense volcano erupted and collapsed on itself 2–3 million years ago. The floor of the caldera is 600 metres (2,000 ft) below its rim and covers more than 260 square kilometres (100 mi^{2}).

campo
1. In the Spanish-speaking world, the rural countryside or the bush.
2. In Brazil, an area of level, open grassland with scattered trees, comparable to a savanna.
canal
A navigable artificial water channel, usually built as a conduit for human activity.
canebrake

A dense thicket of giant cane grasses, often lining a riverbank or other body of water. The term is used primarily in the southeastern United States.
canopy
The canopy is the aboveground portion of a plant cropping or crop, formed by the collection of individual plant crowns.
canyon

A deep cleft between cliffs or escarpments, or a rift between two mountain peaks, resulting from weathering and the erosive activity of a river over long periods of geologic time.
cape
A large headland or promontory extending into a body of water, usually a sea or ocean.
capillary fringe
The soil layer lying immediately above the water table, in which water is drawn up and held within pore spaces by capillarity.
capital
1. A primary city or town of a country, state, province, or other subnational polity, especially one that is a seat of government for the entire polity, either by law or by virtue of being the physical location of the government's offices and meeting places, or both. A capital is often but not always the largest or most economically or historically important city of its constituent. A polity may have one or more capitals, or none.
2. Any place considered to have informal primacy or importance with respect to some characteristic or association, e.g. Milan, Italy is sometimes unofficially called the "Fashion Capital of the World".
caprock
A stratum of erosion-resistant sedimentary rock (usually limestone) found in arid areas. Caprock forms the top layer of most mesas and buttes.
cardinal directions
The set of four primary directions used in cartography and navigation: north (N), south (S), east (E), and west (W). Together they form the primary divisions of the compass rose. They can be further subdivided into the intercardinal directions and secondary-intercardinal directions.
carrying capacity
The total number of human beings that an area can support given the quality of the natural environment and the level of technology of the population.
cartography
The study and practice of making maps and charts. A person who draws or makes maps or charts is called a cartographer.
cartogram
A map in which some thematic mapping variable, such as travel time, population, or gross national product, is substituted for traditional measures of land area or distance such that the geometry or space of the map is distorted in order to convey and emphasize the information of the alternate variable.
cartouche
A decorative panel or emblem on a map or a globe, enclosing the title, legend, scale, or any other information.
castle koppie
See tor.
cataract
A large waterfall, or a long series of rapids in a river, of the type occurring in the river Nile.
catchment
See drainage basin.
causeway
A track, road, or railway raised above a body of water or a low-lying place by virtue of being built upon a man-made embankment, typically constructed of earth, masonry, wood, or concrete. Compare bridge.
cave
Any naturally hollow underground space large enough for a person to enter.
cavern
A type of solutional cave that is formed in soluble rock with the ability to grow speleothems.
cay

A small, sandy, low-elevation island on the surface of an otherwise submerged coral reef; a type of coral island. Compare atoll.
celestial pole
Either of the two imaginary points in the sky at which an indefinitely extended projection of the Earth's axis of rotation intersects the celestial sphere. As the Earth rotates upon its axis, the north and south celestial poles remain permanently fixed in the sky (directly overhead to observers at the North Pole and South Pole, respectively), and all other points appear to rotate around them.
cenote
A natural pit or sinkhole resulting from the collapse of limestone bedrock which exposes groundwater underneath.
census-designated place (CDP)
A concentration of population identified by the United States Census Bureau for statistical purposes.
central business district (CBD)
A centrally located commercial business district in an urban area, typically containing a concentration of office and retail activities.
centroid
The point in a geometric figure for which the coordinates are the average values of the coordinates of all other points in the figure, i.e. the arithmetic mean position of all points in the figure; or the point with the smallest possible average distance from all other points of the figure. In geography, the geographical center of a region of the Earth's surface is the centroid of the two-dimensional shape of that region, as projected radially to sea level or onto a geoid.
chain
A unit of length equal to 66 feet (20.117 m), used especially in public land surveys in the United States; 10 square chains is equal to 1 acre (0.40 hectares). Though the literal chains used to measure this distance have long been superseded, surveying tapes are often still called "chains", and measuring with a tape may be called "chaining".
channel

1. A waterway separating two relatively close landmasses.
2. Any narrow body of water that connects two larger bodies of water.
3. The deepest part of a shallow body of water, often used as a passageway for large ships.
chaparral
A class of terrestrial vegetation characterized by dense, impenetrable thickets of thorny shrubs or dwarf broadleaved trees, commonly found in northern Mexico and the southwestern United States.
chart
A special-purpose map designed for navigation, especially nautical and aeronautical navigation, or to present specific data or technical information.
chevron
A triangular or V-shaped erosional microform which characteristically develops on the shallow flanks of cuestas in arid regions.
chimney
See salient.
chine
A steep-sided coastal gorge, typically of soft eroding cliffs of sandstone or clay, through which a river or stream flows to the sea. The term is used primarily in southern England.
chinook
A warm, dry wind experienced along the eastern side of the Rocky Mountains in the United States and Canada. Most common in winter and spring, it can result in a rise in temperature of 20 °C (36 °F) in a quarter of an hour.
chorography
The art of establishing, describing, or mapping a geographic region or district, or more broadly, the representation of space or place.
chorology
The study of the causal relations of the phenomena present in a region; a comprehensive explanatory study of a region.
choropleth
A map showing the distribution of a phenomenon by graded shading which indicates the density per unit area of that phenomenon; the darker the shading, the greater the density.
chott

An ephemeral, often highly saline lake that forms seasonally with fluctuations in the water table, usually in the winter, in the desert basins of Northwest Africa.
cinder cone
A steep-sided volcano formed by the explosive eruption of cinders that form around a vent. Cinders are lava fragments about 1 centimetre (0.39 in) in diameter.
circle of latitude
See parallel.
cirque

An amphitheatre-shaped valley surrounded on three or more sides by steep, cliff-like slopes and formed by glacial or fluvial erosion.
city
A large human settlement, generally with extensive systems constructed for housing, transportation, sanitation, utilities, and communication.
city center

The commercial, cultural, political, or historical focal point of a city or urban area, where a significant proportion of its population, workforce, business, traffic, administration, and/or other activity is concentrated, often though not necessarily located near its geographic center. The city center may include or overlap with a central business district or downtown area, and the terms are commonly used interchangeably.
city-state
A sovereign state or small independent country that usually consists of a single city and its dependent territories.
clearing
1. The practice of permanently removing vegetation, especially trees and bushes, from a forest or woodland in order to use the space for another purpose, such as agriculture, civic development, or paths for roads, railways, or power lines.
2. Another name for a glade.
cliff
Any vertical or nearly vertical rock exposure, usually formed by the processes of weathering and erosion.
cliffed coast

A coastline where the repeated action of ocean waves has formed steep and often precipitous cliffs, as opposed to a flat or gently sloping alluvial coast.
climate
A pattern of the combination of precipitation and the temperature over time.
climax vegetation
The vegetation that would exist in an area if growth had proceeded undisturbed for an extended period. This would be the "final" collection of plant types that presumably would remain forever, or until the stable conditions were somehow disturbed.
clinometer
See inclinometer.
coast

The area where land meets a sea or ocean. Compare shore.
coastal
Of, on, or pertaining to a coast or coastline, i.e. a boundary or transition between land and sea. Coastal areas are regions defined by interactions between terrestrial and marine processes.
coastal bench
See wave-cut platform.
coefficient of localization

A measure of the degree of localization or spatial concentration of a given phenomenon, e.g. residential housing or industrial activity, within a particular space or spaces. Values for this variable, often mathematically symbolized as L, range from 0 (where the phenomenon is evenly distributed across all spaces) and 1 (where it is densely concentrated in one space and completely absent elsewhere).
col

The lowest point on a mountain ridge between two peaks.
colatitude
The complementary angle of a given latitude; i.e. the arithmetic difference between 90 degrees and the given latitude. For example, the colatitude of 36° 22′ 49″ is 53° 37′ 11″.
colony
A territory under the immediate complete political control of a sovereign metropolitan state but otherwise distinct, often geographically, from the state's home territory. Colonies have no international representation independent of the metropolitan state and its ruling country controls its trade for its benefit. Compare satellite state.
colluvium
Loose, unconsolidated sediment that has been transported and deposited at the base of a hillslope by any of various wash or mass movement processes, such as surface runoff, sheet erosion, or landslides. Typically a heterogeneous mixture of rock types and sizes ranging from silt to talus boulders, colluvium is often derived from eluvium, and differs from alluvium, which is deposited primarily by fluvial activity.
combe

A steep, narrow valley or a large hollow on the side of a hill or coastline, especially one enclosed on all but one side. The term is used primarily in southern England, where it often implies a dry ravine in a limestone or chalk escarpment. See also cwm.
commonwealth
1. Traditionally, a political community founded for the benefit of all or most of the members of the community, i.e. for the public welfare or the common good; or a state or other polity in which the supreme power of government is vested in the people being governed; a republic or a democracy.
2. A free association of otherwise individual, autonomous, self-governing territories organized as a federation or confederation, with a jointly operated government being charged with responsibility for certain matters in the common interest, such as defense.
compass
An instrument used for navigation and orientation that indicates direction relative to the geographic cardinal directions by measuring the orientation of the Earth's magnetic field with respect to the North Magnetic Pole. Compasses often display markings for angles or degrees, which allow them to show azimuths and bearings, in addition to a compass rose.
compass rose

A figure on a compass, map, nautical chart, or monument used to display the orientation of the four cardinal directions — North, East, South, and West — and their intermediate points.

A typical 16-point compass rose, showing four cardinal directions, four intercardinal directions, and eight secondary-intercardinal directions

compass survey
A traverse which relies on the indications of a magnetic compass for orienting the traverse as a whole or for determining the directions of individual lines.
confluence
The place at which two or more rivers or other watercourses flow together to form one larger river or watercourse.
coniferous
Bearing cones; from the conifer family.
contiguity
The characteristic of a group of neighboring political or geographical divisions not being interrupted by politically unaffiliated land or water. Such divisions are said to be contiguous.
continent
One of several very large, contiguous landmasses into which the Earth's land area is divided, generally by geographical or political convention rather than any strict criteria. Geologically, continents correspond largely to areas of continental crust on continental plates.
continental climate
The type of climate found in the interior of the major continents in the middle or temperate latitudes. The climate is characterized by a great seasonal variation in temperatures, four distinct seasons, and a relatively small annual precipitation.
continental divide
The line of high ground that separates the different oceanic drainage basins of a particular continent. The river systems of a continent on opposite sides of a continental divide flow toward different oceans. See drainage divide.
continental shelf
A portion of a continent that is submerged beneath an area of relatively shallow water known as a shelf sea. Though continental shelves are usually treated as physiographic provinces of the ocean, they are not part of the deep ocean basin proper but the flooded margins of the continent.
continentality
The quality of being located on a continent.
contour line

A line marked on a topographic map which connects points of equal elevation above or below a specified reference datum. Multiple contour lines, each representing a different elevation, are depicted together to show the shape of the terrain within the map area.
contour interval
The difference in elevation between any two adjacent contour lines as depicted on a particular topographic map.
conurbation
An extensive urban area formed when two or more initially separate cities coalesce to form a continuous metropolitan area.
cordillera
A long chain of mountain ranges or highlands, especially those formed by the same orogeny and spanning the length of a continent along tectonic boundaries. The term is used in particular to refer to the American Cordillera, an almost continuous system of parallel ranges lining the west coasts of North, Central, and South America.
core area
The portion of a country or territory that contains its economic, political, intellectual, and cultural focus. It is often the center of creativity and change. See also hearth.
cornice
An accumulation of ice and wind-blown snow overhanging the edge of a ridge or cliff face, usually on the lee side of a steep mountain.
corrasion
The process of mechanical erosion of the Earth's surface by the impact or grinding action of particles being transported across it, either by moving water, waves, glaciers, wind, or gravity.
corrie loch
See tarn.
cosmopolitan
Occurring worldwide; belonging to all parts of the world and free of geographical or political limitations. See also global.
coulee
A dry canyon eroded by Pleistocene floods that cut into the lava beds of the Columbia Plateau in the western United States.
couloir
A narrow gully with a steep gradient in a mountainous terrain, often enclosed by sheer cliffs and filled with snow or ice even during the summer months.
country
A region identified as a distinct national entity in political geography. Compare state.
county
A type of subnational division of a country or federal state used for administrative or other purposes.
course
The cardinal direction in which a vessel or aircraft is moving, or in which it is steered. This is not necessarily the same as the heading, the direction in which the craft's bow or nose is pointed; any difference between heading and course is due to the motion of the air or water through which the vessel is moving, or other aerodynamic effects such as skidding or slipping. See also bearing.
cove
1. A walled, rounded, cirque-like opening at the head of a small valley.
2. A small, narrow, sheltered bay, inlet, tidal creek, or recess in an estuary, often within a larger embayment.
3. A small, often approximately circular, wave-cut indentation or recess in a cliff on a large body of water, especially one with a relatively narrow or secluded entrance.
4. A shallow tidal river, or the backwater near the mouth of a tidal river.
crater
Any large, roughly circular depression, pit, or hole in the Earth's surface. Craters are classified into different types based on their ultimate causes; see impact crater, volcanic crater, and pit crater.
crater lake
A lake that forms in a volcanic crater or caldera (such as a maar), an impact crater left by a meteorite, or a crater resulting from a man-made explosion.
craton
An old and stable region of continental lithosphere, characterized by a thick crust composed of ancient crystalline basement rock. Cratons are generally found in the interiors of tectonic plates, having remained relatively unaffected by orogenic and tectonic activity for very long periods of time.
creek
A small, intermittent stream that is larger than a brook but smaller than a river. The term is used primarily in the United States, Canada, and Australia.
crevasse
1. A deep crack, fissure, or chasm in the ice of a glacier or ice sheet, or more generally in any ground surface.
2. A break in the natural levee or bank of a river.
crossroads
A place where many roads or routes of travel intersect or meet; a junction.
crust
The thin shell of solid material that is the Earth's outermost layer and the outermost component of the lithosphere. The Earth's crust is generally divided into two distinct types, oceanic crust and continental crust, both of which "float" on top of the mantle.
cryosphere
The totality of water in the solid phase on the Earth's surface, including glaciers; sea, lake, and river ice; snow; and permafrost. The cryosphere is sometimes considered a subset of the hydrosphere.
cryoturbation

The mixing of materials from various horizons of the soil down to the bedrock due to freezing and thawing.
cuesta
A long, low ridge with a steep scarp slope and a gentle backslope (dip slope).
cultural conversion
The process of cultures becoming more alike.
cultural diffusion
The processes by which culture is spread from one region to another.
cultural diversion
A process in which cultural groups distinguish themselves from other cultural groups.
cultural geography
A branch of human geography which studies the patterns and interactions of human culture in relation to the natural environment and the human organization of space.
cultural landscape
The physical setting created by humans that reflects the identity and culture of the area.
culture
The accumulated habits, attitudes, and beliefs of a group of people that define for them their general behavior and way of life; the total set of learned activities of a people.
culture hearth
The area from which the culture of a particular group or population diffused. See also hearth.
culvert
A tunnel or conduit that channels water through or beneath an obstacle (e.g. through a man-made crossing of a ravine that would otherwise block the natural flow of water), or any artificially buried watercourse.
curvimeter
See opisometer.
cusp
An arc-shaped, dune-like mound of sediment on a beach or foreshore. Cusps tend to be uniformly spaced in repeating patterns close to the shoreline, with the embayment of each arc made of fine-grained sand or gravel and the "horns" made of coarser sediment.
cut bank
A continually eroding bank along a meandering river or stream channel, especially a bank that has been eroded into a nearly vertical cliff. Cut banks generally form on the outside bend of a deep meander, opposite the depositional point bar that forms on the inside bend.
cutoff
The new channel formed when a meandering stream erodes through a narrow strip of land and thereby shortens the length of the main channel.
cwm
See cirque.
cyclone
A large air mass that rotates around a strong center of low atmospheric pressure. It can rotate clockwise or counter clockwise depending on which hemisphere it is in.
Cyclopean stairs
A term referring to the longitudinal profile of some glaciated valleys which have been eroded into a series of consecutive hanging valleys resembling stairs.

== D ==
dale
Another name for a valley.
dam

Any barrier, either natural or artificial, that stops or restricts the flow of water, either on the surface or underground. Man-made dams are most commonly built to impound rivers or streams, generally to retain water for purposes such as human consumption, irrigation, aquaculture, or power generation (whereas related structures such as floodgates and levees are more specifically designed to manage or prevent water flow into particular areas).
dasymetric map
A type of thematic map that uses areal symbols to visualize a spatially dependent variable (e.g. population density) by refining a choropleth map with ancillary information about the distribution of the variable. The dasymetric method attempts to improve the resolution of maps based on average or per-capita figures calculated for discrete administrative units, which tend to show sharp contrasts between adjacent areas, by supplementing these figures with additional geographic data that allow more precise categories to be constructed. Dasymetric maps are a hybrid of choropleth and isarithmic maps, combining their strengths and weaknesses in order to more accurately depict quantities that vary continuously across space.
datum plane

The zero-elevation baseline or vertical datum to which a measurement of elevation or altitude is relative, e.g. the mean sea level calculated for a given location over a given period of time. See also geodetic datum.
de facto segregation
The spatial and social separation of populations that occurs without legal sanction.
de jure segregation
The spatial and social separation of populations that occurs because of legal measures.
debouch

A place where water runoff from a relatively small, confined space emerges into a much larger, broader space, or where a body of water pours forth from a narrow opening, such as where a stream or river enters a lake or ocean.
deciduous forest
A forest composed of trees which lose their leaves each year.
decolonization
The process of ending the colonization of a region or a state.
deep
A trough-like depression or trench in the ocean floor, of limited extent but great depth, generally more than 5,500 metres (18,000 ft) below sea level.
deferred junction
A confluence of two watercourses in which a tributary stream is prevented by levees, natural or artificial, from immediately joining another stream or river and consequently is forced to flow parallel beside it, usually within a large floodplain, for a considerable distance before the channels eventually merge, often at the convex bend of a large meander.
defile
A narrow pass or gorge between mountains or hills.
deforestation
The destruction of forests by any means, whether naturally or by human activity.
degree
A unit of angular measure, represented by the º symbol. A circle is divided into 360 degrees; subdivisions of the degree include the minute (1/60 of one degree) and the second (1/3600 of one degree). Degrees are commonly used to divide the roughly spherical shape of the Earth for geographic and cartographic purposes, e.g. when reporting latitudes and longitudes.
degree day
Deviation of one-degree temperature for one day from an arbitrary standard, usually the long-term average temperature for a place.
dell
A small, secluded hollow, usually within a grassy, park-like, partially wooded valley.
delta
A landform at the mouth of a river where the main stem splits up into several distributaries. It is formed from the deposition of the sediment carried by the river as the flow leaves the mouth of the river. It is often affected by incoming tides. Compare estuary.

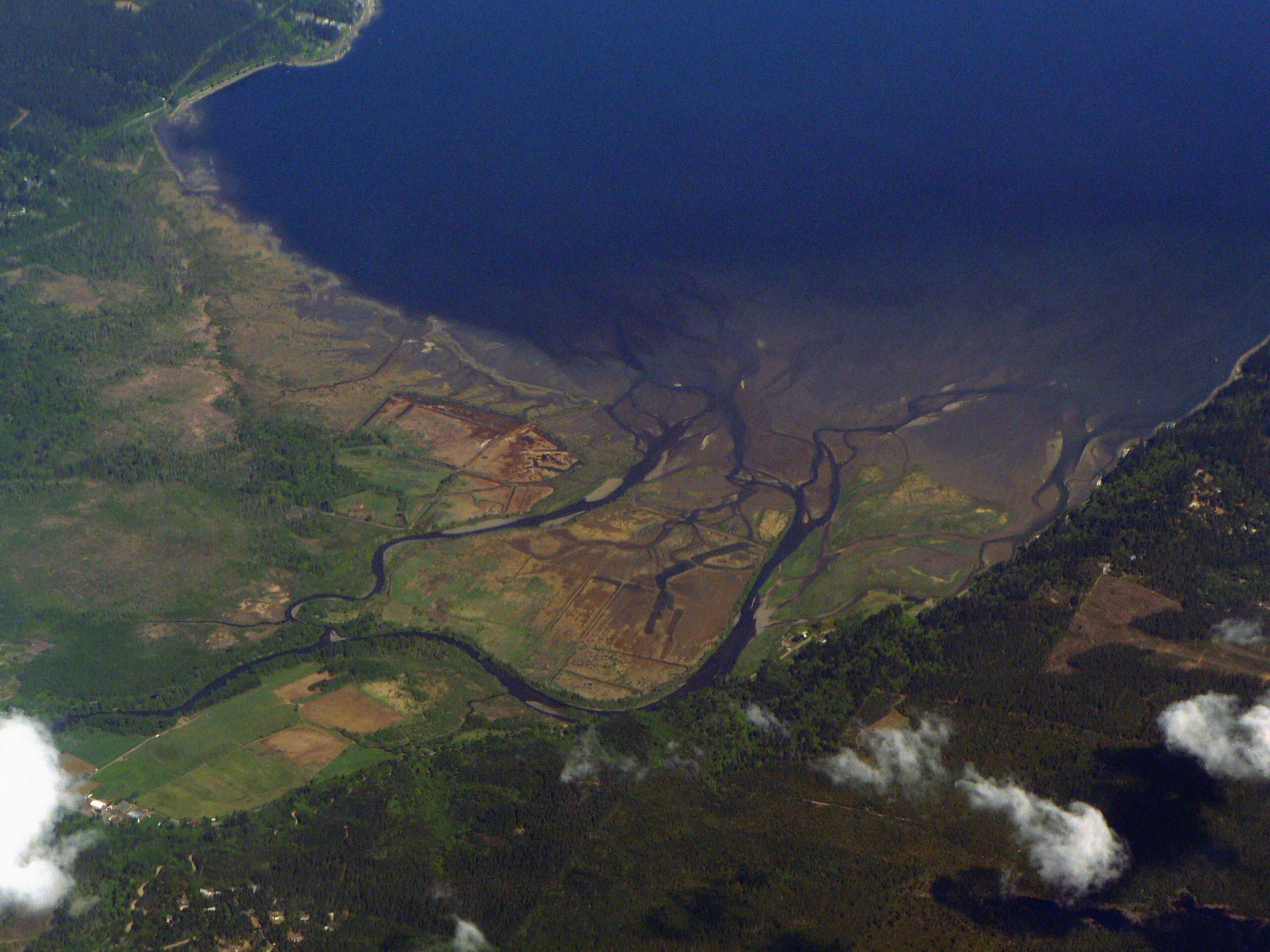
The Skokomish River delta in the northwestern United States, where the river flows into Puget Sound

demilitarized zone (DMZ)
A politically neutral area or buffer zone in which treaties or agreements between polities or other competing factions forbid military installations, activities, or personnel. These zones are usually situated along an established boundary or frontier separating territories controlled by adjacent military powers or alliances.
demography
The study and systematic analysis of population, particularly human population.
demoiselle
A pillar of rock weathered from volcanic breccia or similar material and capped by a large boulder which has protected the material underneath.
demonym

A word identifying a person or a group of people in relation to a particular place, usually derived from the name of the place (which may be any kind of place, formal or informal, of any size or scale, from a town or city to a region, province, country, or continent) and used to describe all residents or natives of that place, regardless of any ethnic, linguistic, religious, or cultural differences which may exist within the local population. Examples include "Vietnamese", describing a person from Vietnam; "Detroiter" for a person from the city of Detroit, Michigan; and "Macedonian" for a person from North Macedonia or the wider historical region of Macedonia.
denudation
The uncovering of deeper layers of rock by any natural process, e.g. erosion, weathering, or mass movement.
dependency

A territory relying on or subject to the control of another country, neither possessing full political independence nor forming an integral part of the controlling country's political or economic interests.
deposition
Any natural process by which material such as soil and rocks is added to a landform or landmass, e.g. by the action of wind, water, ice, or gravity in transporting previously weathered surface material, which comes to rest when sufficient kinetic energy is lost and accumulates in layers of sediment. See also sedimentation.
depression
Any landform that is sunken or depressed below the surrounding area. Depressions include an enormous variety of landforms and can form by a number of different mechanisms, including erosion, ground collapse, tectonic activity, volcanism, and meteorite impacts.
derelict land
An area of land which has been damaged or devalued by some process, either natural or man-made (e.g. extractive industry), and/or simply neglected, causing it to be abandoned by human interests (and often other organisms) and leaving it incapable of being used productively in its present condition. See also brownfield land.
desert
An arid, barren area of land where little precipitation occurs and living conditions are consequently unfavorable for most plant and animal life. Deserts are characterized by exposure of the unprotected ground surface to processes of denudation as well as large variations in temperature between night and day. They are often classified by the amount of precipitation they receive, by their average temperature, by the causes of their desertification, or by their geographical location.
desert pavement

A ground surface often found in arid environments, consisting of interlocking rock fragments of pebble and cobble size, closely packed after the removal of finer rock material and smoothed or polished by blown sand so that eventually their upper surfaces are more or less uniformly flat.
desert varnish

A conspicuous orange-yellow to black coating often present on exposed rock surfaces in arid environments, consisting of thin, hard, polished layers of metal oxides, especially iron and manganese, which form when minute quantities of matter migrate to the surface of the rock by capillary action and are then precipitated by evaporation.
desertification
The process by which a previously fertile area becomes increasingly arid, infertile, or desert-like; a type of land degradation in which biological productivity is lost due either to natural or man-made processes, e.g. climate change or overexploitation of soils for agriculture.
desire line
A straight line drawn on a map between the point of origin and the destination of a trip, i.e. the shortest distance between these two points, indicating the route a person would like or desire to follow if it were possible.
desire path

Any path or trail, often a footpath, created as a consequence of erosion caused by repeated human or animal traffic, usually because it is the shortest or easiest route to navigate between an origin and a destination. Desire paths often emerge as shortcuts where constructed paths or roads are circuitous, have gaps, or are non-existent.
dew pond
A shallow artificial pond built to capture and hold rainwater or sea mist in order to provide water for livestock, made especially in areas where natural supplies of surface water are not readily available, such as on the chalk downlands of southern England.
diapir
A type of igneous intrusion in which a more mobile, ductile, or deformable rock or other material is forced to intrude into relatively brittle overlying rocks.
diaspora
The scattered dispersion of a human population from its original homeland; or the members of a dispersed population, now residing in various locations to which they are not indigenous.
digital elevation model (DEM)
A three-dimensional computer graphics representation of a geographic terrain surface created from elevation data. DEMs are the most common basis for digitally produced relief maps.
digital line graph (DLG)
A standardized vector cartographic data format developed by the U.S. Geological Survey representing topologically structured point, line, and area features digitized from topographic maps.
dike
1. A ditch, wall, embankment, or ridge, natural or man-made, that is an obstacle to something else; another name for a levee.
2. In geology, an intrusion in which molten rock has ascended through an approximately vertical fissure and solidified into a wall of rock that is often harder or less permeable than the rocks of the surrounding strata.
diocese
A type of administrative division used by certain Christian churches for religious purposes.
direction
The position of one point relative to another without reference to the distance between them, usually expressed as the angular distance in degrees between a line connecting the two points and a reference direction. In cartography, navigation, and orienteering, direction is often considered only with respect to a two-dimensional plane (see compass rose), but it is also commonly interpreted in three dimensions.
discharge
In hydrology, the volumetric flow rate of water through a cross-sectional area, i.e. the volume of water that passes a particular point along a waterway (e.g. a cross-section of a stream channel) per unit time. The measure includes the volumes of any suspended solids, dissolved chemicals, or organic matter in addition to the water itself. Discharge is commonly measured for both natural and man-made hydrological systems, where it may be referred to by various names including streamflow and outflow.
discordant coastline

A coastline which cuts transversely across the predominant orientation of the local geological strata, i.e. not parallel to them, as with a concordant coastline.
dissected plateau
A landscape produced by significant stream erosion and incision of a plateau such that only a small part of the plateau surface is at or near the original elevation of the summit; much of the area instead occurs as eroded hills or badlands.
distance decay
The decrease in cultural or spatial interactions between two places as the distance between them increases. This effect may be noticeable in towns and cities, where certain characteristics such as pedestrian traffic, building height, and land value tend to decline with greater distance from the city center.
distributary
A stream or river that branches off and flows away from a main channel and does not return to it. Distributaries are common near river deltas. Contrast tributary.
district
A type of administrative subdivision used by governments and institutions worldwide, typically at regional or local levels. Districts are commonly drawn to define the jurisdictions of special local government services, such as law enforcement and education, and often function more or less independently of the municipal or county governments that designate them. The term can refer to a wide variety of official and colloquial subdivisions, including electoral districts, school districts, and shopping districts.
divide
See drainage divide.
doab
In parts of South Asia, the low alluvial plain lying between and reaching to the confluence of two rivers or streams. See also interfluve.
doline

A shallow enclosed basin or funnel-shaped depression typical of karst landscapes, usually with a flat floor and linked to the underlying drainage system by a vertical shaft. See also sinkhole.
dome
1. A steep-sided mound that forms when very viscous lava is extruded from a volcanic vent.
2. An uplifted area of sedimentary rock with a downward dip in all directions, often caused by molten rock material pushing upward from below. The sediments have often eroded away, exposing the rocks that resulted when the molten material cooled.
donga
In southern Africa, another name for a gully or badland carved by extreme erosion.
dormant volcano
An active volcano that is in repose (quiescence) but is expected to erupt in the future.
dormitory town
See commuter town.
downland

An open, treeless expanse of gently undulating, elevated grassland, usually of chalk and supporting grazing for livestock. The term is used primarily in southern England, Australia, and New Zealand.
downtown
In English-speaking North America, the commercial, cultural, and often historical and/or geographical center of a city or town, especially a large city within a major metropolitan area, often synonymous with its central business district.
drainage
The natural or artificial removal of surface and/or sub-surface water from an area with excess water, e.g. via runoff facilitated by channels such as streams and rivers, into which water collects and is transported to sea level by gravity. The patterns, hierarchies, and evolution of drainage networks are widely studied in physical geography disciplines.
drainage basin

Any area of land where precipitation collects and drains into a common outlet, such as into a river, lake, ocean, or any other body of water. The drainage system includes all of the surface water from precipitation runoff and snowmelt, as well as all of the groundwater beneath the Earth's surface. Each drainage basin is separated topographically from adjacent basins by a drainage divide.
drainage divide

The topographical barrier that separates neighboring drainage basins. Divides are often, though not always, located along conspicuous elevated ridges or mountain ranges.
draw

1. A terrain feature formed by two parallel ridges or spurs with low ground in between them.
2. Another name for an arroyo, ravine, or gulch, especially one with a broad floor and gently sloping sides.
draw down
The maximum extent to which the water table is reduced in elevation as a result of pumping water from a well that penetrates an aquifer. The amount of draw down diminishes logarithmically with distance from the site of the well, a fact which determines the shape of the subsurface cone of depression in the area surrounding the well.
drift
All sediment transported by a glacier, sorted or unsorted, whether deposited directly by the ice or by glacial meltwater.
drift ice

A type of sea ice consisting of multiple ice floes that are not attached to the shoreline or any other fixed object such as a shoal, and which are therefore free to "drift" under the influence of winds and ocean currents. Contrast fast ice.
drowned valley
A valley which was originally formed on land but later partially or entirely submerged beneath the sea due to a rise in sea level. See also fjord, calanque, and ria.
drumlin
An elongated hill in the shape of an inverted spoon or half-buried egg which is formed by glacial ice acting on underlying unconsolidated till or ground moraine.
dry farming
A type of farming practiced in semi-arid or dry grassland areas without irrigation, instead using such approaches as fallowing, maintaining a finely broken surface, and growing drought-tolerant crops.
dry gap
See wind gap.
dry point
An area of firm or dry ground in a wetland, marsh, or floodplain, often capable of supporting a human settlement.
dryland
An ecoregion or more generally any land area defined by a relative scarcity of water, where precipitation is evenly balanced or exceeded by evaporation from surfaces and evapotranspiration by plants. Drylands encompass all sub-humid and arid environments, from tropical savannas to hyper-arid extremes such as deserts.
dune
A hill of loose sand built by the movements and erosional and depositional processes of wind or water, often occurring in deserts and coastal areas.

== E ==
Earth science

1. A collective term for the various fields of natural science related to the planet Earth.
2. The branch of science that studies the physical constitution and characteristics of the Earth and its atmosphere, using methods and tools from geography, geology, physics, chemistry, biology, and mathematics to build a quantitative understanding of how the Earth works and changes over time.
earthquake
A sudden and intense shaking of the ground due to tectonic activity.
Eastern Hemisphere
The half sphere of the Earth that is east of the Prime Meridian and west of the antimeridian. It is opposite the Western Hemisphere.
easting
economic distance
The physical distance a commodity may travel before its value is exceeded by the costs of transporting it.
economic geography
A sub-discipline of geography which studies the location, distribution, and spatial organization of economic activities across the world.
economic tiger
A country with rapid economic growth due to cheap labor, quickly advancing technology, and/or policies favoring aggressive exports.
economies of agglomeration
The economic advantages that accrue to an activity by locating close to other activities; benefits that follow from complementarity or shared public services.
econym
See oeconym.
ecoregion

A type of biogeographic province that is smaller than a bioregion and which contains characteristic, ecologically and geographically distinct, and relatively uniform assemblages of biological communities and species. Ecoregion boundaries often overlap within ecotones and mosaic habitats, and most ecoregions contain habitats that differ from those described for their assigned biome.
ecotone
A transition area between two biological communities, where different communities meet and integrate. It may manifest as a gradual blending of the communities across a broad area, or as an abrupt boundary line.
ecumene

1. The habitable world according to the ancient Greeks; the part of the Earth's surface that is suitable for permanent human settlement, e.g. because it is climatically tolerable and physically occupiable.
2. All of human civilization considered collectively.
edge city
A concentration of businesses, commercial buildings, or retail and entertainment venues situated outside of a traditional downtown or central business district in what was previously a suburban residential or rural area.
edgelands
The transitional areas of "fringe" space at the boundaries of a country, city, or other artificial geographical entity, often distinguished by a partly man-made, partly natural landscape that is in the earliest stages of human management and organization. Compare hinterland.
effective accessibility
The extent to which a place or service is actually accessible, governed not only by the distance to be traveled but also by whether or not the means of transport, the time available, and social circumstances make access possible.
ekistics
The scientific study of human settlements of all types, incorporating concepts such as regional, metropolitan, and community planning and dwelling design with the goal of achieving harmony between the inhabitants of a settlement and their physical, social, and cultural environments.
electoral geography
A branch of human geography concerned with analysis of the organization, methods, results, and consequences of political elections in the context of geographic space and using geographical techniques.
elevation
1. The height of a geographic location above or below a fixed reference point; in particular, the height of a point on the Earth's surface with respect to sea level (or at least to a reference geoid used as an approximation of the Earth's mean sea level). Compare altitude, geopotential height, and depth.
2. The vertical angle between the horizontal and a high point, e.g. between the horizon and a star in the night sky, or between the base of a mountain and its summit.
3. In architecture, a view of one of the sides of a building, or a drawing of this view.
ellipsoid
See reference ellipsoid.
emergence
1. The rise of the level of a land surface with respect to the sea, so that land formerly under the sea becomes dry.
2. The location at which an underground stream or aquifer comes to the surface.
emergent coastline
A coast or shoreline resulting from a rise in land surface elevation relative to sea level.
empolder
To reclaim by the creation of a polder.
enclave
A tract or territory completely surrounded by and enclosed within the territory of exactly one other state, country, or other political entity. Unlike enclaves, exclaves can be surrounded by more than one other state.

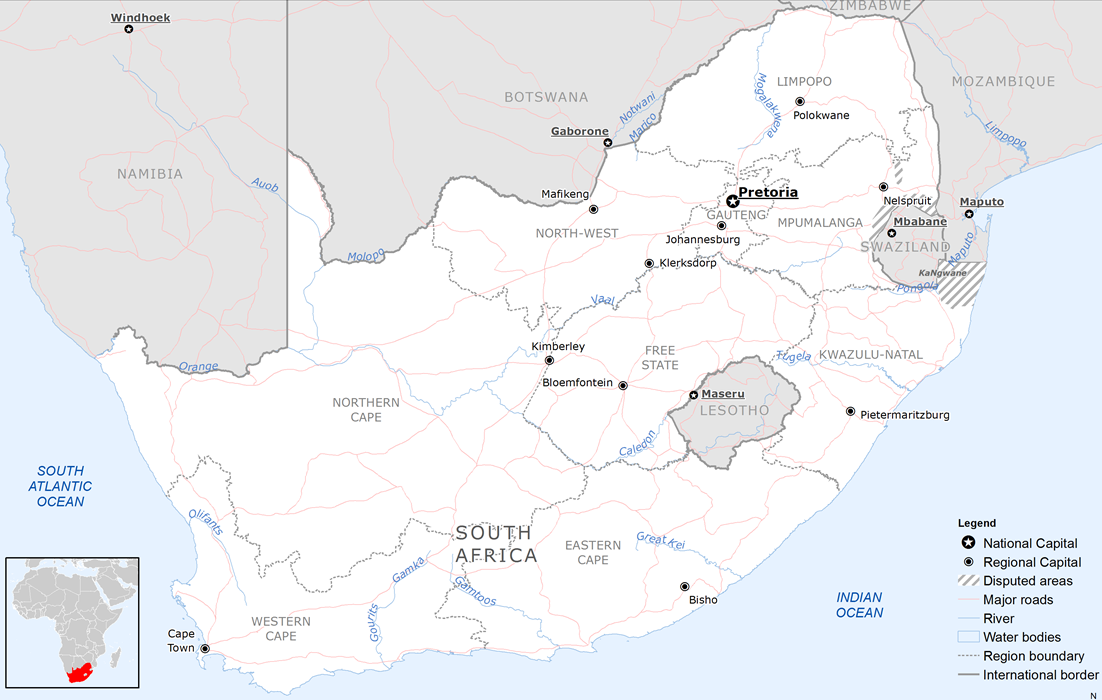
The independent country of Lesotho is completely enclaved by the country of South Africa. The country of Eswatini, to the east, is not an enclave because it borders two countries: South Africa and Mozambique.

endemic
Restricted or exclusive to a certain place, region, or people, having originated there, and existing nowhere else.
endorheic basin

A closed drainage basin that allows little or no outflow to external bodies of water but converges instead into internal lakes or swamps which equilibrate through evaporation.
englacial
Embedded within a glacier. Contrast subglacial and superglacial.
entrepôt

A place (e.g. a port, city, or trading post) to which physical goods or merchandise are brought to be stored temporarily while awaiting export to another country, and where they are not liable to customs duties. Though the term once described important commercial centers situated along long-distance trade routes, modern customs areas have largely made such entrepôts obsolete, and the term is now more commonly used to refer to duty-free ports with a high volume of re-export trade.
environment
Everything on and around the Earth's surface and atmosphere; the complex of physical, chemical, and biological elements which comprise the natural world, especially as contrasted with man-made objects or spaces.
environs
The area surrounding a particular geographical place, i.e. its surroundings or environment.
epeiric sea
A large, shallow body of salt water on a continental shelf which is connected to the ocean; an inland sea. See also marginal sea.
epicenter
The point on the Earth's surface directly above the focus of an earthquake, near which the seismic waves produced by the earthquake are usually most noticeable.
equal-area projection
equator
1. An imaginary line dividing a spheroid such as a planet into northern and southern hemispheres, defined by the intersection of the spheroid's surface and the plane perpendicular to its axis of rotation, which results in a great circle exactly midway between and hence equidistant from the planet's geographic poles and is therefore defined as zero degrees latitude.
2. The Earth's equator in particular (often capitalized as the Equator): the imaginary circle of latitude halfway between the geographic poles which is assigned a latitude of zero degrees (0°) and therefore used as a reference point from which all other lines of latitude are measured. At 40,074 kilometres (24,901 mi) in circumference, is the largest great circle of the Earth. Places located on or near the Equator experience approximately the same amount of daylight year-round, which causes local daytime temperatures and climate patterns to be relatively stable throughout the year.

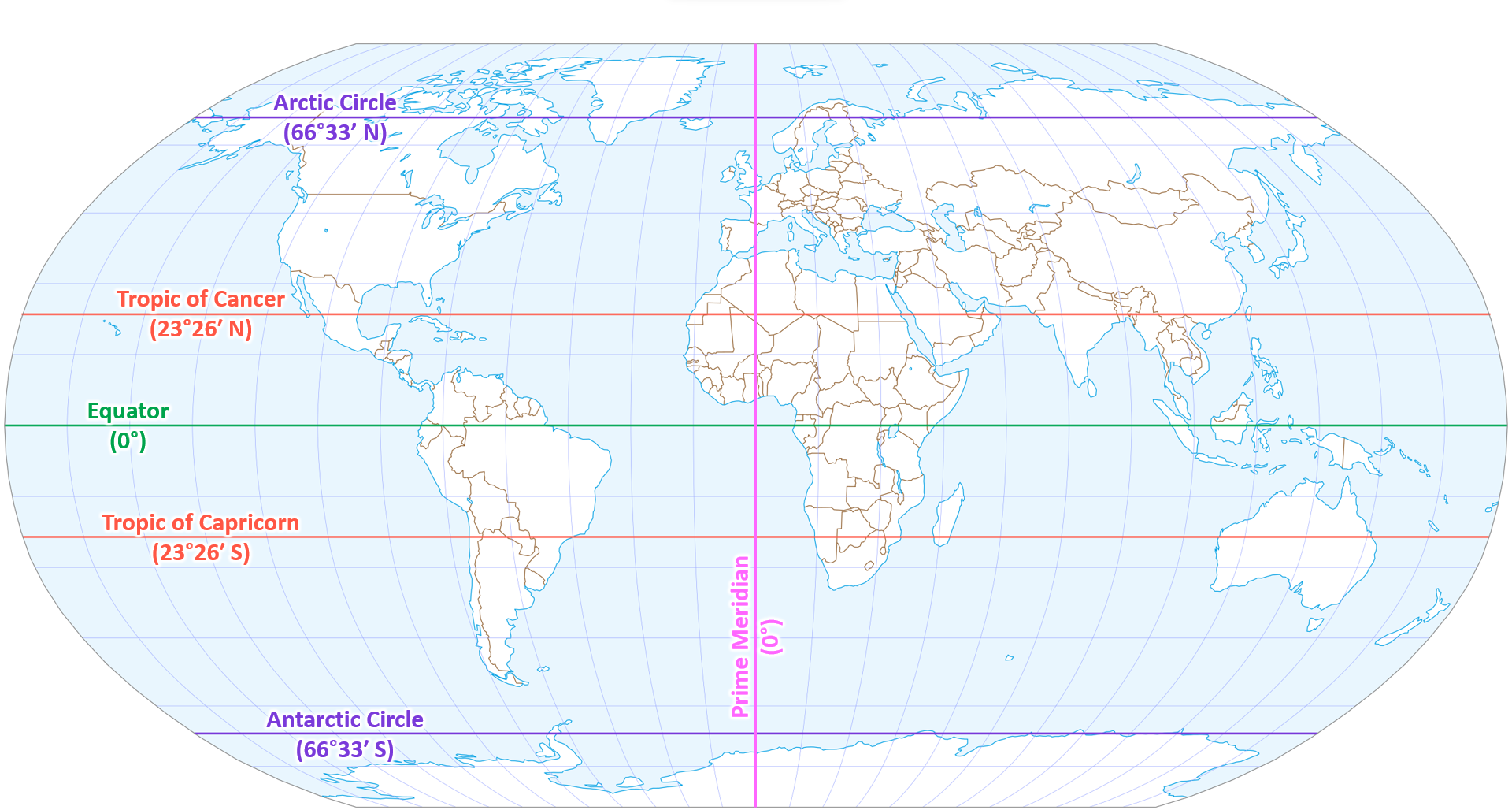
Robinson projection of the globe showing the five major circles of latitude – the Arctic Circle and Antarctic Circle (purple), the Tropic of Cancer and Tropic of Capricorn (orange), and the Equator (green) – plus the Prime Meridian (pink).

equatorial cylindrical orthomorphic map projection
See Mercator projection.
equidistant
Equally distant from a point, object, or location; e.g. a given location A is said to be equidistant from two other locations B and C if B and C each have the same distance from A.
equirectangular projection
erg

A broad, flat desert area covered by wind-swept sand and having little or no vegetative cover.
erosion
The variety of surface processes by which soil, rock, or dissolved material is removed from one location on the Earth's surface and transported to another location where it is then deposited, resulting in the gradual wearing away of the Earth's crust. A huge variety of geophysical processes contribute to mechanical and chemical forms of erosion, commonly the actions of water, ice, wind, and gravity. Though the terms are often used interchangeably, erosion is technically distinct from weathering, which occurs in situ and involves no transport.
erratic

A boulder that has been carried from its source by a glacier and deposited as the glacier melted. Such boulders are often conspicuous because they differ geologically from the surrounding rock.
escarpment
A long cliff or steep slope separating two comparatively level or more gently sloping surfaces and resulting from erosion or faulting.
esker

A long, winding ridge of stratified sand and gravel, usually occurring in glaciated or formerly glaciated areas.
estavelle

A karstic sinkhole or ponor which, depending on the season and weather conditions, can serve as either a sink or a source of freshwater.
estuary
The broad lower course of a river where it enters the ocean and is affected by the tides. Compare delta.
étang
A shallow pool or lake caused by the ponding of backwash draining from a beach by material brought ashore by the sea.
etchplain
A plain beneath which the bedrock has been subjected to considerable subsurface weathering, known as "etching". Erosion of the regolith overlying an etchplain often exposes topographical irregularities such as inselbergs.
ethnic group
A group of people in a country who share a unique culture and identity.
evorsion
See pothole.
exaration
See plucking.
exclave
A portion of a state or territory that is geographically separated from the main part by surrounding foreign territory of one or more other states or political entities. Many exclaves are also enclaves.
exotic stream
A stream found in an area that is too dry to have spawned such a flow. The flow originates in some moister section.
extinct volcano
A volcano that is not expected to erupt again.
exurb
A region or district that lies outside a city and usually beyond its suburbs; a place of this type is called an exurb. Compare rural.

== F ==
fairway
The part of a navigable waterway containing the navigable channel, in particular the central, deepest, widest, or most commonly used channel.
fall line
A geomorphologic unconformity between an upland region of relatively hard crystalline basement rock and a coastal plain of softer sedimentary rock.
fallow
Agricultural land that is plowed or tilled but left unseeded during a growing season. Fallowing is usually done to conserve moisture and soil nutrients.
false origin
A selected point in a projected coordinate system from which the position of any place can be expressed in terms of its coordinates with respect to the selected point. The false origin differs from the true origin in order to exclude negative values.
fast ice

Sea ice that is more or less securely "fastened" to a coastline, to the sea floor, or to grounded icebergs, and which therefore does not move with currents and winds (unlike drift ice). The formation of fast ice is usually seasonal and its properties vary with water depth, topography of the sea floor, tides, and pressure from adjacent drift ice.
fault
A fracture in the Earth's crust accompanied by a displacement of one side of the fracture.
fault-block mountain
A mountain mass created by either the uplift of land between faults or the subsidence of land outside the faults.
fault zone
An area of numerous fractures in the Earth's crust along which movement has occurred. The movement may be in any direction and involve material on either or both sides of the fractures.
federation
A form of government in which powers and functions are divided between a central government and a number of political subdivisions that have a significant degree of political autonomy.
fell
A wild, barren, high-altitude moor or upland, or a treeless alpine tundra, often studded with boulders or rock outcrops; or a broad, isolated mountain summit. The term is used primarily in northern England, Scotland, and Fennoscandia.
felsenmeer
See blockfield.
fen
An area of spongy, waterlogged ground containing decaying vegetation that accumulates over time into peat, and which is supplied with an input of mineral-rich surface or groundwater by a direct connection to a larger hydrological system. This external input typically results in higher mineral concentrations and a more alkaline pH than other peat-forming ecosystems such as bogs. Fens are one of four main types of wetland, along with bogs, marshes, and swamps.
field
1. Any large, open, outdoor space, natural or man-made, especially one with a natural surface covering such as grass or soil and having few trees and structures, permitting long sightlines.
2. (variable) A property, quantity, or observation (e.g. temperature, soil moisture, population density, etc.) that can be theoretically assigned to any point of space and which varies across space. Both scalar and vector fields are found in GIS applications, although the former is more common. Also spatially dependent variable.
figure of the Earth
The size and shape of the Earth as studied in geodesy. Applications requiring varying levels of precision have led to the development of many different models of the Earth, ranging from simple spheres to much more accurate approximations such as geoids.
firn
A type of ice that is at an intermediate stage between snow and glacial ice. More specifically, firn is partially compacted névé left over from past seasons which has subsequently recrystallized into a form that is harder and denser than névé.
first bottom
A colloquial term loosely applied to the topographically lowest step of a floodplain that experiences regular flooding (though the frequency considered "regular" is inconsistently specified), i.e. the first part to be inundated when a flood occurs. The term is used primarily in the Midwestern United States.
First Law of Geography

A fundamental assumption of spatial analysis articulated by the Swiss-American geographer Waldo Tobler as "Everything is related to everything else, but near things are more related than distant things." This principle is considered foundational to the concepts of spatial dependence and autocorrelation, and is expressed mathematically in the inverse distance weighting method of spatial interpolation and in regionalized variable theory as the basis for kriging.
firth
Another name for a coastal inlet, strait, or bay associated with the mouth of a large river, where the tidal effects of seawater passing upriver have widened the riverbed into an estuary. The term is used primarily in Scotland.
fish ladder
A series of shallow steps down which water is allowed to flow, designed to permit salmon or other anadromous fish to circumvent artificial barriers such as dams as they swim upstream to spawn.
fissure
A long, narrow opening or line of breakage made by cracking or splitting, especially in rock or earth.
fjard
A large, open, navigable body of water between the islands of an archipelago or between an island and the mainland, either on the sea coast or in freshwater lakes or rivers.
fjord

A long, narrow, navigable marine inlet with steep sides or cliffs created by glacial erosion.

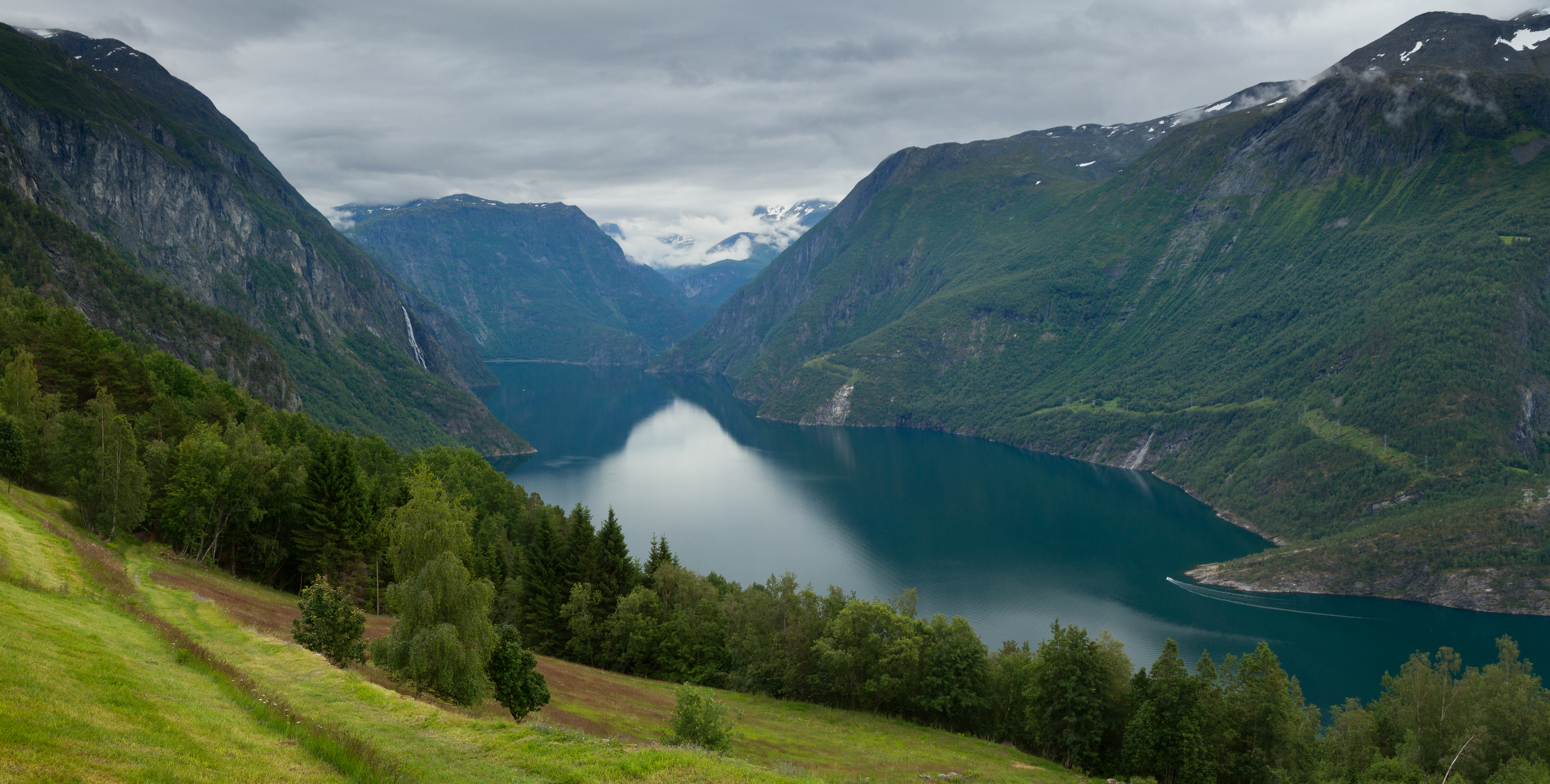
A fjord in Norway

flark
A hollow or depression within a bog, often water-filled and usually occurring as part of a repeated series of such depressions which are elongated and parallel to each other and separated by intervening ridges known as strings.
flood bypass
flood wall
A primarily vertical artificial barrier designed to temporarily contain the waters of a river or other waterway which may rise to high levels during flooding events. Flood walls are narrower and typically easier to build than dikes or levees, so they are mainly used in locations where space is limited or where building more traditional flood-control structures would interfere with other interests.
floodbank
See levee.
floodplain

A broad, flat area of land adjacent to a river or stream which is leveled by annual flooding and by the lateral and downstream movement of meanders.
floodway
1. Another name for a flood bypass.
2. A large-capacity channel or culvert designed to capture and divert floodwaters or excess streamflow from populous or flood-prone areas and eventually drain it into a river or other body of water, e.g. an artificial drainage canal bounded by levees. They often run below street level in larger cities.
3. A road crossing of a flood-prone channel, built at or close to the natural ground level. It is similar to a causeway but crosses a shallow and often dry depression that is subject to flooding, rather than a continuously flooded waterway.
4. A part of a floodplain kept clear of encumbrances and reserved for emergency diversion of floodwaters.
floor
The level or nearly level lower part of a valley or basin, or the bed of any body of water, such as a stream, lake, or ocean.
flow regime
The general behavior of a river or other watercourse as defined by its average flow conditions throughout the year, including seasonal variations in discharge, size and frequency of floods, and frequency and duration of droughts.
flute
A glacial landform created by the movement of a glacier around a boulder, consisting of a lineation or streamlined furrow or ridge parallel to the direction of ice movement. They generally form in newly deposited till or older drift and can reach heights of 25 metres (82 ft) and lengths of 20 kilometres (12 mi).
fluvial
Of or pertaining to rivers or streams; produced by the action of a river or stream.
fluvial terrace
focality
The characteristic of a place that follows from its interconnections with more than one other place. When interaction within a region comes together at a single place (i.e. when the movement focuses on that location), the place is said to possess focality.
focus

The point inside the Earth's crust from which an earthquake originates.
foothills
A geographic transition zone defined by gradual increases in elevation between plains or low-relief hills and adjacent topographically higher hills, mountains, or uplands.
footslope
The part of the profile of a hillslope that forms the concave surface at the base of the slope. It is a transition area between sites of erosion and transport higher up the slope (e.g. the shoulder and backslope) and sites of deposition further down the slope (the toeslope).
ford
A place, natural or man-made, where a river or stream is shallow enough to be crossed by wading, or by getting a vehicle's wheels wet (as opposed to crossing a permanently dry bridge). Fords may be seasonal or temporary, becoming impassable during high water.
foredeep
A relatively narrow, deep, elongated, and steep-sided trough in the ocean floor, usually near or parallel to a mountainous land area or associated with an archipelago, or such a trough when infilled with sediment. See also foreland basin.
foreland
1. Any land area or territory located in front of something else.
2. A landform projecting into the sea, e.g. a cape or headland.
3. The seaward trading area associated with a particular port or harbor.
4. (glaciology) The area between the current leading edge of a glacier and the moraines of the most recent maximum.
foreland basin
A type of structural endmember basin that develops adjacent and parallel to a mountain range as a result of lithospheric flexure during its orogeny. Topographic loading and downflexure creates space in the basin that is filled by sediment eroded from the range. Compare rift basin.
foreshore
The part of a seashore located between the lowest low water line and the mean high water line. See also intertidal zone; contrast backshore.
forest
Any extensive area dominated by communities of trees.
formal region
An area of the Earth that is unified by some measurable physical or human characteristic.
form line
A contour line whose precise position on a map has not been accurately surveyed but rather interpolated from surrounding contours.
fresh water
Any naturally occurring water characterized by low concentrations (typically less than 0.05% by volume) of dissolved salts and other solids relative to either salt water or brackish water. Sources of fresh water on Earth include glaciers, ice caps, icebergs, bogs, lakes, rivers, streams, and most groundwater.
friction of distance
The influence and restraining effect of distance on all forms of movement, based on the fundamental geographical principle that movement necessarily incurs one or more costs, in the form of physical effort, energy, time, and/or other resources, and that these costs are directly proportional to the distance traveled. Such costs effectively resist the propensity for movement, akin to the friction of classical mechanics, and hence the concept of physical distance is a critical factor in determining whether or not a given movement, event, or process occurs.
frontalier

Someone who lives in one country and works in a neighboring country, commuting across the international border each workday and returning to their country of residence on a nightly or weekly basis; someone who lives and works across political or geographical frontiers.
frontcountry
frontier
1. The area near or beyond a political or geographical boundary; a march or borderland.
2. The area near or beyond the edge of a settled or civilized area, consisting of sparsely populated or uninhabited wilderness. See also hinterland and edgeland.
frost hollow

A hollow or depression surrounded on all sides by higher terrain, such as the floor of a deep valley, where very cold, dense air tends to concentrate as strong terrestrial radiation on the slopes above forces the cold air downslope, often at nighttime. Temperatures in these hollows can be tens of degrees colder than the immediate surroundings.
functional diversity
The characteristic of a place where a variety of different activities (economic, political, or social) occur, most often associated with urban places.
functional region
An area of the Earth's surface that is defined by its interaction with or connectivity to other regions.

== G ==
gallery forest
A narrow strip of trees or shrubs lining both banks of a river or stream in otherwise treeless, open country. Above very narrow streams, the foliage on each side may meet in the canopy.
gazetteer
A geographical dictionary or directory used in conjunction with a map or atlas and containing information concerning the geographical make-up, social statistics, and physical features of a country, region, or continent.
gentilic
See demonym.
geo

A narrow inlet within a deep cleft in a rocky coastline, sheltered by tall, near-vertical cliffs created by wave-driven erosion along faults and bedding planes in the rock. The term is primarily used in the islands of northern Scotland.
geoblocking

A technology that restricts access to online content according to an Internet user's geographical location, which may be determined by any of various geolocation techniques, including checking the user's IP address against a blacklist, triangulating GPS queries, and measuring the latency of a signal traveling between the user's computer and another endpoint in the network.
geocode
A concise, human-readable series of letters, numbers, and/or other symbols which represents and uniquely identifies a particular geographic entity so as to distinguish it from other geographic entities in a finite set or database.
geocoding
The conversion of a text-based description of a physical location, such as the name of a place or a street address, into geographic coordinates, e.g. latitude and longitude, which can then be plotted in a spatial coordinate system and represented on a map to locate and uniquely identify its position on the Earth's surface. The reverse process, where geographic coordinates are converted into a text-based description, is known as reverse geocoding.
geocell
In many geographic information systems, an imaginary polygon on the surface of the Earth with dimensions 1 degree of latitude by 1 degree of longitude, or approximately 111 by 111 kilometres (69 by 69 miles) at the Equator, representing an area equal to about 12,321 square kilometres (4,757 square miles). The east-west distance equal to 1 degree of longitude gradually decreases as one approaches the poles, such that the shape of a geocell becomes increasingly trapezoidal at higher latitudes.
geodata

Any data or information having an implicit or explicit association with one or more locations on the Earth, especially that used for georeferencing in GIS databases.
geodesic

In geodesy, the shortest line on a specific surface between two particular points on that surface. The geodesic between a given two points on a flat plane is a segment of a straight line drawn between those points; the geodesic between two points on a sphere is a shorter arc of the great circle which connects both points. Geodesics may also be plotted on the surface of an ellipsoid, such as an idealized reference ellipsoid used to model the shape of the Earth.
geodesy

The science of accurately measuring and understanding the Earth's geometric shape, orientation in space, and gravitational field and how these properties change over time.
geodetic control network

geodetic datum

A coordinate system and set of reference points used for locating places on the Earth, which defines horizontal and vertical coordinates upon a particular reference ellipsoid that approximates the figure of the Earth. Geodetic datums are used in geodesy, navigation, and surveying applications to translate positions indicated on paper or digital maps to their actual positions on the Earth; because the Earth is an imperfect ellipsoid, localized datums such as the ED50 covering only specific countries or regions are often more accurate representations of their area of coverage than global standards such as the WGS 84 of the World Geodetic System.
geodetic north
See true north.
geodetics
See geodesy.
geodynamics
A subfield of geophysics and Earth science that studies the physical dynamics of the Earth by applying physics, chemistry, and mathematics to the understanding of how mantle convection and other internal processes lead to plate tectonics and geological phenomena such as mountain formation, volcanism, earthquakes, and faulting, among others.
geofence
A virtual boundary or perimeter drawn around a real-world geographic area in a GIS software application, allowing distinctions between the properties of adjacent places which cannot be physically made on the ground to be made and stored digitally in an electronic database.
geographic coordinate system
A coordinate system used in geography that enables every location on Earth to be specified by a set of numbers, letters, or symbols. Geographic coordinates are often chosen such that one of the numbers represents a vertical position such as elevation and two or three other numbers represent a horizontal position such as latitude and longitude.
geographic factor
Any physical or human condition that impacts the environment of a geographic place.
geographic information science (GIS)

The scientific study of data structures and computational techniques for capturing, representing, processing, and analyzing geographic information.
geographic information system (GIS)
Any system of computer software tools designed to allow users to record, store, manipulate, analyze, manage, and present large sets of spatial or geographic data.
Geographic Names Information System (GNIS)
A digital public-domain database developed by the U.S. Geological Survey and the U.S. Board on Geographic Names which contains name and locative information about more than two million physical and cultural features located throughout the United States and its territories. Each feature recorded in the database receives a unique feature record identifier called a GNIS identifier.
geographic pattern
Any observable model, style, or trend in some element of geography, generally observed on maps.
geographic process
Any process or activity, natural or man-made, that brings changes to some aspect of physical or human geography.
geographical inertia

The tendency of a place with established installations and services to maintain its size and its importance as a focus of economic or industrial activity after the conditions originally influencing its development have appreciably altered, ceased to be relevant, or disappeared.
geographical mile
A unit of length defined as the distance equal to one minute of arc along the Earth's Equator: approximately 1,855.3 metres (1.1528 mi; 1.8553 km). The precise length varies with the reference ellipsoid used to approximate the shape of the Earth. Regardless of the particular ellipsoid, the length of one degree of longitude at the Equator is equal to exactly 60 geographical miles.
geography
The scientific study of the lands, features, inhabitants, and phenomena of Earth.
geoid
The shape that the surface of the Earth's oceans would take under the influence of Earth's gravity and rotational acceleration alone, in the absence of other influences such as winds and tides. It is often characterized as the precise mathematical figure of the Earth: a smooth but irregular gravitational equipotential surface at every point of which, by definition, the direction of the force of gravity is always perpendicular and spirit levels are always parallel. Its shape results from anomalies in the Earth's gravitational field caused by the uneven distribution of mass within and on the Earth's surface. A reference ellipsoid is an idealized approximation of the more complex and accurate geoid.
geoinformatics
The science and technology which develops and uses information science infrastructures to address problems and analyze data within geography, cartography, geoscience, and related branches of science and engineering.
geoinformation
See geodata.
geolocation
The identification or estimation of the real-world geographic location of an object, involving the generation of a set of geographic coordinates in order to determine a more meaningful description of location, such as a street address.
geolocking
See geoblocking.
geomatics

The scientific discipline that involves gathering, storing, processing, and delivering geographic or spatially referenced information.
geometer
See surveyor.
geomorphology
The study of the arrangement and form of the Earth's crust and of the relationship between these physical features and the geologic structures beneath.
geopotential
1. The potential of the Earth's gravitational field, expressed as the sum, U, of the gravitational potential V_{g} of the Earth at point P and the rotational potential V_{c} at the same point, i.e. U = V_{g} + V_{c}.
2. The negative of the sum of the gravitational potential V_{g} and the rotational potential V_{c}, i.e. U = −(V_{g} + V_{c}). This alternative definition is often used by physicists.
3. The potential energy of a unit mass relative to the geoid, numerically equivalent to the work which would be done in lifting the mass from the geoid against the force of gravity to the elevation at which the mass is actually located.
georeferencing
geoscience
See Earth science.
geosophy
The study of geographical knowledge from any and all points of view, past or present, true or false; the study of the nature and expression of geographical ideas.
geospatial science
See geomatics.
geosphere
The collective non-living parts of the Earth: the lithosphere, the atmosphere, the cryosphere, and the hydrosphere.
geostatistics
A branch of statistics which involves the organization, management, and analysis of spatial and spatiotemporal datasets. Geostatistical algorithms are often incorporated in GIS software applications.
geosystems
See physical geography.
geotargeting
ghetto
A section of a city occupied by members of a minority group who live there because of social restrictions on their residential choices. Originally, the term referred specifically to a section of a European city to which Jews were confined.
ghost town
A deserted or abandoned village, town, or city, especially one in which remaining buildings and infrastructure such as roads are still visible. The term is also sometimes used to refer to settlements that are still populated, but significantly less so than in previous years.
glacial
Of or pertaining to a glacier or to the consequences of glaciation; formed, deposited, caused, or affected by glaciological processes.
glacial drift
See drift.
glacial erratic
See erratic.
glacial flour
See rock flour.
glacial lake
A lake or other enclosed body of water created by historical or ongoing glacial activity; e.g. the Great Lakes of North America.
glacial till
The mass of rocks and finely ground material carried by a glacier and deposited when the ice melts. This creates an unstratified material of varying composition.
glacial trough
glaciation
1. The process or state of being covered with a glacier.
2. Another name for a glacial period, an interval of time that is marked by colder temperatures and advancing glaciers.
glacier
A persistent mass of dense ice that moves slowly but constantly under its own weight, and which is composed largely of compacted snow that forms over very long periods of time wherever the annual accumulation of snow exceeds its rate of melting and sublimation. Glaciers slowly deform and abrade the land beneath them, causing many unique geomorphological processes and creating a huge variety of landforms including cirques, moraines, and fjords. They form exclusively on land and are distinct from the much thinner ice that forms on bodies of water.
glaciology
The scientific study of glaciers, including their formation, composition, behavior, causes, effects, and distribution; or more generally of ice or any natural phenomena involving ice.
glacis
A smooth, gently sloping surface at the foot of a hill, mountain, or any other high promontory, whether natural or artificial. In the latter case, the term is used in particular to describe a stone or earthen slope constructed at the base of some historical military fortifications.
glade

Any large, open, mostly treeless area within a forest.
glen
A long valley bounded by gently sloping, concave sides, and typically narrower and deeper than a strath. The term is used primarily in Scotland.
glint
A steep cliff, terrace, or edge of a plateau.
global
1. Of or concerning all parts of the world (i.e. worldwide); affecting or distributed across the whole of the Earth.
2. Of or relating to a globe or sphere; spherical or approximately so.
3. Comprehensive; total; encompassing all or nearly all considerations, categories, items, etc.
global city

A city which functions as an important or primary node in the global economy. Though criteria are not strictly defined, a global city typically is very large; dominates trade and economic interactions within a large surrounding area; supports a large and demographically diverse population; serves as a center of ideas and innovation in business, science, culture, and politics; and/or is a headquarters for major financial institutions, multinational corporations, or worldwide media and communications networks.
global navigation satellite system (GNSS)
Global Positioning System (GPS)
A satellite-based radionavigation positioning system owned and operated by the United States Department of Defense and made available for use by both the military and the general public. It is one of several GNSS standards that provides geolocation and time information, transmitted via microwave signals, to enabled satellite navigation devices, known as GPS receivers, anywhere on or near the Earth where there is an unobstructed line of sight to at least four GPS satellites. Modern state-of-the-art GPS receivers can accurately pinpoint locations to within 30 centimetres (0.98 ft).
globalization
The process of interaction and integration among people, companies, governments, and cultures across the world. A complex and multifaceted phenomenon, globalization is considered largely the result of economically motivated advances in transportation and communication technologies in the past several centuries which have dramatically increased interactions between otherwise isolated groups of people.
globe
A true-to-scale map of the Earth that duplicates its round shape and correctly represents relative areas, sizes, and shapes of physical features, distances, and directions.
gnamma
See panhole.
gore
1. An irregularly shaped parcel of land of any size, often approximately triangular, that is left between two adjoining surveyed parcels as the result of incomplete or inaccurate boundary surveys.
2. A lune-shaped map which may be fitted to the surface of a globe with a negligible amount of distortion.
gorge
See canyon.
goulet
A narrow passageway, particularly a narrow strait or inlet connecting a gulf, harbor, lagoon, or barachois to the sea, or a narrow bar or neck of land between two bodies of water. See also narrows and gully.
graben
A depression or valley bounded on either side by distinct, parallel escarpments or faults and formed by the downward displacement of a block of the Earth's crust. Grabens often occur side-by-side with horsts, their uplifted or non-displaced counterparts, in a repeated series of vertical displacements.
grade

A physical surface that is inclined with respect to the horizontal, or the angle between that surface and the horizontal, typically expressed in degrees, or calculated as a ratio of "rise" (vertical distance) to "run" (horizontal distance) and expressed as a fraction or percentage; a larger number indicates a steeper incline. The term "grade" is often used to describe the incline of man-made surfaces such as roads and the roofs of buildings, whereas the term "slope" is more commonly used to describe natural surfaces such as the sides of hills or mountains or the beds and banks of watercourses.
grassland
Any land area where the vegetation is dominated by grasses (i.e. plants of the botanical family Poaceae), sometimes also inclusive of grass-like plants of other families. A large and important biome occurring worldwide, grasslands may be natural or created for agricultural purposes.
graticule
A network of lines on a map or chart (or imagined on the surface of the Earth) representing geodetic parallels of latitude and meridians of longitude.
gravimetry
The measurement of the strength of a gravitational field, especially the Earth's gravitational field, typically by calculating the acceleration due to gravity at a particular point on the Earth's surface. Because it can vary widely across the surface, knowing the local magnitude of the gravitational force is often necessary in order to produce accurate geographical data.
gravity model
Any spatial interaction model used to demonstrate and predict that the degree of interaction between two places (e.g. the movement of people or volume of trade between them) is directly proportional to their population sizes and inversely proportional to a function of the distance between them, by analogy with the laws of gravitational attraction between massive bodies in physics.
great circle

Any circle on the surface of a sphere created by the intersection of the sphere and a plane that passes through its center. A great circle divides the sphere into two equal hemispheres, and all of a sphere's great circles have the same center and circumference, which by definition is the largest possible circumference of the sphere. The mathematical properties of great circles make them useful in geodesy, where they are often visualized upon the surface of the Earth (despite the fact that the Earth is not a perfect sphere): for example, the Equator of the idealized Earth is a great circle, and any meridian with its antimeridian forms a great circle. Because the shortest path between any two points on the surface of a sphere follows the arc of a great circle, great-circle distances are often used as approximations of geodesics for the purposes of air and sea navigation. See also small circle.

A great circle exactly bisects a sphere; the arc between points A and B is a great-circle distance.

great-circle bearing
The horizontal direction or bearing followed by the arc of a great circle through a given pair of terrestrial points, expressed as the angular distance from a reference direction.
great-circle distance

The length of a line between two points which follows the arc of a great circle as defined by the intersection of the Earth's surface with an imaginary plane passing through the Earth's center. It is the shortest route between those two points on the Earth's surface.
green belt

A special land-use zone designated in some cities to prevent development of wild, undeveloped, or agricultural land surrounding or adjacent to urban areas, in order to conserve natural ecosystems, to allow the return and establishment of wildlife, and/or to create urban green space for aesthetic or recreational purposes. The term may also refer more specifically to the boundary between developed and undeveloped areas rather than to the undeveloped area itself.
greenfield
A previously undeveloped plot of land for which development is proposed or on which it is in progress, or which is intentionally not being developed so as to permit it to evolve naturally. Compare brownfield.
grid
A pattern of lines on a chart or map, such as those representing latitude and longitude, which helps determine absolute location.
grid magnetic angle

The angular difference in direction between grid north and magnetic north, typically expressed in degrees east or west of grid north.
grid north
The direction northwards as indicated by the grid lines of a map projection, which may or may not be aligned with geodetic north and magnetic north.
grivation
See grid magnetic angle.
groundwater
The water present beneath the Earth's surface in soil pore spaces and in fractures and voids within geological strata. Contrast surface water.
grove
A small group of trees growing close together and generally surrounded by little or no undergrowth.
growing season
The part of the year during which local weather conditions (i.e. temperature and precipitation) permit the normal growth of plants in a given location. What defines a "growing season" is often informal and colloquial, and may vary widely by location and from year to year; in many places, the local growing season is defined as the period of time between the average date of the last frost (in temperate parts of the Northern Hemisphere, this typically occurs in the spring) to the average date of the first frost (in the autumn).
groyne
A rigid, man-made hydraulic structure extending from an ocean shore or river bank, constructed to interrupt water flow and limit the movement of sediment by longshore drift.
gulch
A deep, V-shaped valley formed by erosion, often containing a small stream or a dry streambed, especially one in arid regions.
gulf
A large arm or inlet of an ocean or sea that lies within a curved coastline, similar to a bay but usually larger and often with a narrower opening.
gully
A landform resembling a large ditch or a small ravine created by the action of swift running water eroding deeply and sharply into soil, typically on a hillside.
gumbo
Any very fine, clayey soil which rapidly turns to sticky mud when wet. The term is used primarily in the United States and Canada.
guyot

An isolated underwater seamount with a flat top that is at least 200 metres (660 ft) below the water's surface.
gypsey
See winterbourne.
gyre
Any large system of circulating ocean currents, particularly those related to large-scale wind movements. Gyres are caused by the Coriolis effect and play a fundamental role in the global thermohaline circulation.

The Earth's oceans circulate within five major gyres – the North Pacific, North Atlantic, South Pacific, South Atlantic, and Indian Ocean Gyres – as well as many smaller accessory currents, depicted here on a map projection with a south polar aspect.

gyroscope
A device consisting of a spinning disc or rotor mounted in such a way as to preserve the orientation and angular velocity of its axis of rotation with respect to an inertial reference frame, irrespective of perturbations to the mounting itself, which makes it possible to measure and maintain an unbiased equilibrium in the attitude and/or course of a moving object such as an airborne or waterborne vehicle or camera. Modern digital gyroscopes and their associated readouts are widely used in navigation and geodesy as the basic sensor in direction-seeking, direction-keeping, and attitude stabilization systems.

== H ==
habitus
An individual's sense of "home", or of their place in the world, comprising socially ingrained habits, beliefs, skills, and dispositions based on their geographical environment, cultural origin, inheritance, experiences, and the social networks they develop throughout their life, all of which may be subject to refashioning with passing time or increasing distance.
hachure
Any of a series of non-numerical lines used on a map to indicate the general orientation and steepness of topographical terrain. Such lines vary in length, thickness, and spacing, with steeper slopes indicated by shorter, heavier, and more closely spaced lines.
haff
A coastal lagoon of fresh or brackish water on the south coast of the Baltic Sea, fed by a stream which is blocked by a nehrung, through which it is linked to the sea by a channel.
halo effect
In the context of geography, the detrimental effect of a border or other boundary on locations close to it, making those locations unattractive to people intending to visit or settle there; e.g. a political boundary in disputed territory, where immigration across the boundary occurs frequently. There may also be beneficial effects on such locations.
ham
In southern England, a plot of meadow land, especially a tract of rich pasture near a river; or a small settlement, ranging in size from a single homestead to a town.
hamada

A desert landscape consisting of high, largely barren, rocky plateaus where most of the sand has been removed by deflation, and thus lacking most surficial materials other than boulders and exposed bedrock.
hamlet
A small human settlement, variably defined as one the size of a town, village, or parish or as a smaller subdivision of or satellite entity to a larger settlement.
hanging valley
A tributary valley that is higher in elevation than the main valley into which it drains, such that it appears to be "hanging" above the lower valley. Hanging valleys are commonly the result of differential glacial erosion, when adjacent areas beneath a glacier are subjected to different rates of erosion.
harmonic tremor
One of a series of continuous rhythmic earthquakes in the Earth's upper lithosphere that can be detected by seismographs. Harmonic tremors often precede or accompany volcanic eruptions.
head of navigation
The farthest point above the mouth of a river that can be navigated by watercraft, whether because of natural or man-made obstacles.
heading
The compass direction in which the bow or nose of a moving vessel or aircraft is pointed. This is not necessarily the same direction in which the vessel is actually traveling, known as its course; any difference between heading and course is due to the motion of the air or water through which the vessel is moving, or other aerodynamic effects such as skidding or slipping. See also bearing.
headland
A high coastal promontory that extends out into a body of water, often surrounded by steep cliffs. A very large headland is often called a cape.
headwall
A steep slope or sheer cliff face at the upper end of a valley (e.g. at the back of a cirque), or at the active face of a mine, pit, or quarry.
headwaters
1. Another name for the source of a river, stream, or other watercourse, i.e. the point or points furthest from the mouth of a particular channel at which precipitation, meltwater, or groundwater first accumulates into a persistent, identifiable, and/or named body of water whose contents ultimately empty into that particular channel; or all of the uppermost tributaries of a watershed considered collectively (of which there may be thousands), typically including all streams identified as first-order through third-order in conventional stream order systems.
2. The entire region, inclusive of land, surrounding these sources, often abutting the boundary of a drainage divide that separates distinct watersheds.
hearth
The source area of any innovation; the place from which an idea, crop, artifact, or good is diffused to other areas.
heartland
1. The central or interior part of a region.
2. A part of a region considered essential to the viability and survival of the whole.
heath

A shrubland habitat found mainly on free-draining, infertile, acidic soils and characterized by open, low-growing, woody vegetation.
hectare (ha)
A metric unit of area defined by a square with sides of 100 metres, equal to 10,000 m^{2} or 2.471 acres. There are 100 hectares in 1 square kilometre (km^{2}).
hedgerow

A line of closely spaced shrubs or trees, planted and trained so as to form a barrier or to mark a boundary between two neighboring areas, or to serve as a windbreak for crops in adjacent fields.
heliotrope
A device used in geodetic surveying to reflect sunlight onto a distant point so as to aid long-distance observations.
hemisphere
One half of the Earth, usually conceived as resulting from the division of the globe into two equal parts of either north and south or east and west.
heteroclinal fold
A geological fold of which one side is sloped at an angle steeper than that of the other side.
high plain
A plain lying at a high elevation, generally above 600 metres (2,000 ft).
high water mark
A natural or man-made demarcation that indicates the maximum rise of a body of water over an area of land. Though not necessarily an actual physical mark, river or sea waters rising to a high point often leave a lasting physical impression such as a noticeable discoloration or deposited debris; such a mark is often the result of a flood or storm surge. High water marks may reflect an all-time high, an annual high, or the high point for some other period of time (e.g. a tidal cycle). A natural delineation created by debris deposited by a high tide is called a strandline. See also wash margin and mean high water.
highland

1. Any elevated region of land, often one that is mountainous or situated atop a plateau. The term is sometimes reserved for relatively low-elevation mountain ranges or foothills.
2. Any area of land (mountainous or otherwise) that is higher in elevation relative to another area. In this sense, the term is often used as a conditional descriptor to distinguish related habitats or ecosystems, especially freshwater riparian areas, on the basis of elevation above sea level.
highway
Any major public or private road or other thoroughfare on land, especially one that is paved and capable of supporting high-capacity, rapid transit between populated places.
hill
Any landform that extends above the surrounding terrain. A hill is generally considered less steep than a mountain.
hillock

A small hill.
hinterland
1. An area that is tributary to a place and linked to that place through lines of exchange or interaction.
2. The area, not necessarily settled itself, that is nonetheless influenced by a particular settlement or establishment; i.e. its sphere of influence.
historical geography
A branch of human geography that studies the ways in which geographic phenomena have changed over time, especially (though not necessarily limited to) geographic change as it relates to human activity; the geography of the past, whether real, perceived, or theoretical.
hoe
A projecting ridge or outcropping of land, its height ending abruptly or steeply. The term is used primarily in placenames in Great Britain.
hogback

A long, narrow ridge or series of hills with a narrow crest and steep, symmetrical slopes of nearly equal inclination on both flanks, especially one created by the differential erosion of an outcropping which exposes homoclinal sedimentary rock strata. Compare esker, drumlin, and cuesta.

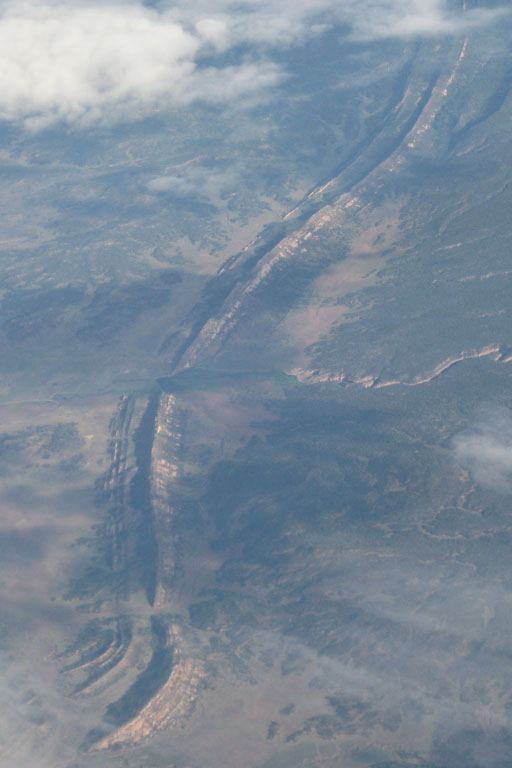
Aerial view of a hogback in the southwestern United States

holding
Land owned or occupied by legal right for the purpose of agriculture.
homestead
1. (dwelling) A house or home, especially an isolated farmhouse with its associated outbuildings on a large agricultural holding such as a ranch; or a small rural settlement of dispersed farms.
2. (legal concept) In the United States, a plot of land given legal meaning by a series of federal laws granting applicants ownership of land in the public domain upon the condition that they live on it and improve it. Homesteaders were initially granted plots of 160 acres (0.65 km^{2}), which was considered adequate to support a single family, but later as much as 640 acres (2.6 km^{2}).
horizon

The apparent line that separates the ground from the sky, dividing all visible directions into two categories: those that intersect the Earth's surface and those that do not. When not obscured by buildings, trees, or mountains, the true horizon can be useful in navigation and determining positional orientation. In perfect visibility, to an observer on Earth standing at an elevation of 3 metres (10 ft) from the horizontal, the horizon in any direction is approximately 6.5 kilometres (4 mi) distant; at 30 metres (100 ft), it is 21 kilometres (13 mi) away.
horizontal equivalent
The distance between two points on a land surface when projected on to a perfectly horizontal (i.e. flat) plane, e.g. on a map, as opposed to measuring the actual physical length along the real-world surface, which can be greatly increased by slopes and other topographic variation. The distance between the start and end points of any route, even if at the same elevation, will often appear to be much shorter on a map than the shortest route that could actually be walked between them, because of the influence of real-world changes in vertical displacement along the path followed by the route.
horn
A mountain formed by the back-to-back abutment of three or four adjacent cirques, leaving a distinctly pyramidal peak.
horst
A raised block of the Earth's crust, bounded by parallel escarpments or faults, that has been displaced upward or has remained stationary while adjacent blocks on either side, known as grabens, have been displaced downward. Horsts and grabens often occur side-by-side in a repeated series of vertical displacements.
hotspot
An area in the middle of a lithospheric plate where magma rises from the mantle and erupts at the Earth's surface, despite being far from the plate's tectonic boundaries. Volcanoes often occur above a hotspot.
hum
A residual hill in limestone country, resembling a haystack, left standing when the surrounding land surface is eroded.
human geography
The branch of geography that studies humans and their communities, cultures, economies, and interactions with the environment by examining their relations with and across space and place. Along with physical geography, it is one of the two major sub-fields of geography.
human–environment interaction
The interdependent relationship between humans and the environment.
humanistic geography

An approach in human geography which emphasizes the subjective as distinct from the objective in that it stresses the importance of perception, creativity, thinking, and beliefs as well as human experience and values in the formation of the attitudes of people toward their environment and in affecting their relationships with it.
hummock
A small knoll or mound, typically less than 15 metres (49 ft) in height and situated above an otherwise level ground surface.
humus
Partially decomposed organic soil material.
hundred
In England, Scandinavia, and many other parts of the world, an administrative subdivision of a larger region, often a county or shire, with its own judicial authority.
hydrograph
A graph showing the rate of flow (i.e. the discharge) of water past a specific point of measurement in a river or other channel over time, typically expressed in cubic metres or cubic feet per second (m^{3} or ft^{3}/s).
hydrography
The study of the surface waters of the Earth.
hydrosphere
The totality of the water found on, under, and above the Earth's surface in liquid, solid, and gaseous forms, including all oceans, lakes, rivers, and streams, as well as all ice and glaciers and subsurface groundwater. Some definitions restrict the hydrosphere to liquid water only, instead placing solid forms in the cryosphere and gaseous forms in the atmosphere.
hypsography
The geographic representation on a map of features related to elevation, altitude, and other measures of height above a reference surface (and sometimes inclusive of depths below the reference surface as well).
hypsometer
Any instrument used to measure the height or elevation of an object above a reference surface, either by trigonometry or by measuring changes in atmospheric pressure or boiling point. Trigonometric principles are applied when viewing the measured object from a distance, e.g. when determining the heights of trees or buildings, or when surveying the elevations of distant landforms; whereas the principle that atmospheric pressure decreases predictably with elevation above sea level is applied in instruments that measure their own height (i.e. the elevation of the instrument's location).
hypsometry
The study or measurement of the elevation or depth of features of the Earth's surface relative to mean sea level. In a narrower sense, hypsometry may refer to land elevations only, and therefore is sometimes viewed as the terrestrial equivalent of bathymetry.

== I ==
ice age
Any very long period of Earth's history during which surface and atmospheric temperatures are greatly reduced, resulting in the development or expansion of continental and polar ice sheets and widespread glaciation. The most recent such period was the Pleistocene Epoch, which ended approximately 12,000 years ago.
ice cap
A flattened, often dome-shaped mass of ice that covers less than 50,000 square kilometres (19,000 sq mi) of land area and is not constrained by topographical features such as mountains; larger masses of ice are termed ice sheets. Contrast polar ice cap.
ice floe
A large piece of floating drift ice, typically with a flat surface and at least 20 metres (66 ft) across at its widest point.

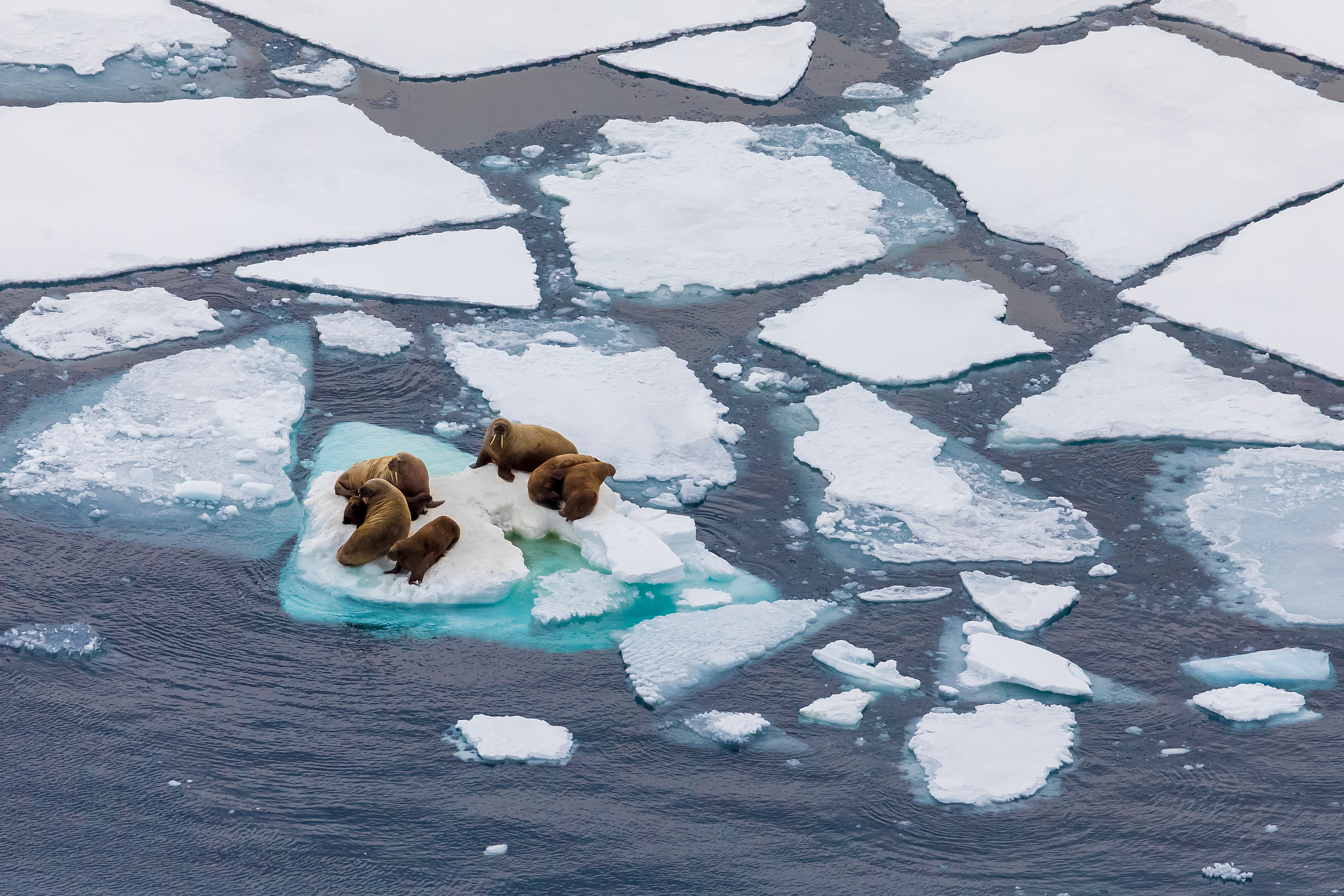
Walruses on ice floes in the Arctic Ocean

ice sheet

A mass of glacial ice that covers more than 50,000 square kilometres (19,000 sq mi) of land area; smaller masses of ice may be termed ice caps or ice shelves. The two polar ice sheets are the only ice sheets that currently exist on Earth.
ice shelf
A large floating platform of ice formed when a glacier or ice sheet in a coastal area flows onto the ocean surface. By contrast, sea ice is formed directly over the water and is typically much thinner.
ice stream
A region of relatively fast-moving ice within an ice sheet that flows like a stream under its own weight (making it essentially equivalent to a glacier) and empties into the ocean. Ice streams are responsible for the majority of the mass lost from both the Antarctic and Greenland ice sheets.
iceberg
A large chunk of fresh water ice which has broken away from a larger body of ice (such as a glacier or ice shelf) and is floating freely in open water.
icefall
A portion of a glacier where a steepening or narrowing of the underlying bed causes the ice to move more rapidly than elsewhere, resulting in a chaotic, highly fractured surface characterized by numerous crevasses and seracs.
igneous rock
Rock formed when molten (melted) materials harden.
immigration
The migration of humans across international borders to a destination country where they are not residents or where they do not possess citizenship in order to settle there as permanent residents. People that move permanently to another country are called immigrants.
impact crater
A type of crater formed by the hypervelocity collision of a solid astronomical body, such as a meteor, with the Earth's surface. Unlike volcanic craters, impact craters typically have raised rims higher in elevation and depressed floors lower in elevation than the surrounding terrain.
impoundment
1. Another name for a dam that impounds a body of water.
2. The reservoir created by such a dam.
improved land
Any land area which has been intentionally altered from its natural condition by human activity, such as ploughing, clearing, cultivation, or some other form of management, and thereby made more valuable or productive for human purposes (not necessarily to the benefit of any other organism or the environment in general). Legal definitions vary with location, but in most countries the term refers primarily to certain types of agricultural land or to property which has been developed for residential or commercial use.
inclinometer

An instrument used to measure angles of slope, elevation, or depression with respect to the direction of the gravitational force, i.e. in the vertical plane, including both inclines and declines. The measure may be expressed in degrees, percentage points, or topos.
index contour
A contour line drawn with a heavier line weight to distinguish it from intermediate contours. Depending on the contour interval, index contours are usually indicated every fourth or fifth contour, along with their assigned numerical values, in order to facilitate ease of interpretation.
index map
See map index.
indigenous
Originating in or native to a particular place or region, usually used of a living organism.
inertia costs of location
Costs borne by an activity because it remains located at its original site, even though the distributions of supply and demand have changed.
influent
(of a stream, river, or any natural water flow) Flowing into a larger watercourse or body of water.
infrastructure
The broad set of facilities and interrelated systems that serve a city, country, or any other inhabited area, encompassing the structures and services necessary for its industries, economies, and residential spaces to function. Infrastructure may include public and private physical structures such as roads, railways, bridges, tunnels, water reservoirs, canals, sewers, and electrical and telecommunications networks, among other things. A well-developed infrastructure is essential to enable, sustain, and improve living and working conditions in any society or organization.
ingression coast

A generally flat coastline whose shape has been largely defined by the penetration of the sea into relatively low-lying areas of the land surface, often as a result of crustal movements or a rise in sea level, such that the boundary between land and water closely matches the topographic contours of the land prior to its being covered by seawater.
inland
Of, relating to, within, or towards the interior of a landmass, i.e. distant from the coast.
inland sea
A very large, isolated expanse of open water in the interior of a landmass, either completely surrounded by dry land or connected to the ocean by a river, strait, or other narrow waterway.
inland waters
Any surface watercourse or body of water surrounded entirely by land, including ponds, lakes, reservoirs, and rivers, or all such waters within a polity considered collectively. See also internal waters.
inlet
An indentation of a shoreline, usually long and narrow, which leads to an enclosed body of salt water, such as a sound, bay, lagoon, or marsh.
inselberg

An isolated rocky hill, knob, ridge, or small mountain that rises abruptly from a virtually level surrounding plain. Compare mogote.
inset
A subsection of a map that is reserved for depicting another map of the same place at a different scale, often a smaller scale to show relative location within a larger geographic area (e.g. a country's location on the globe) or a larger scale to show increased detail (e.g. of public transit routes in a downtown area), or with different features or overlays in order to provide additional information that would be difficult to interpret if presented in the main map area. Insets are usually outlined with an obvious boundary to prevent confusion, and may include their own set of cartographic elements such as a scale, graticule, and legend.
inshore
(relative to a position on a body of water) Near to or moving towards the shore; shorewards of a position as opposed to seawards of it. See also onshore and offshore.
insular
Of or relating to an island, or suggestive of the isolated condition of an island.
integrated drainage
A drainage pattern in which stream systems have developed to the point that all parts of the landscape drain into some part of a stream and to a common base level, the initial or original surfaces having essentially eroded away entirely, such that few or no closed drainage systems are present.
integrated geography

The branch of geography that describes and explains the spatial aspects of interactions between human individuals or societies and their natural environment.
intercardinal directions

The set of four intermediate directions used in cartography and navigation, each of which is located halfway between a pair of cardinal directions: northeast (NE), southeast (SE), southwest (SW), and northwest (NW). They are often included in the compass rose and are used to define further subdivisions such as the secondary-intercardinal directions.
interfluve
A narrow, elongated, and plateau-like or ridge-like landform between two valleys, or an area of higher ground between two rivers in the same drainage basin.
intermediate directions
See intercardinal directions.
intermittent stream
A stream or other watercourse in which water does not flow continuously but dries up occasionally, often predictably with the seasons, as opposed to a perennial stream which flows year-round. See also bourne.
intermontane

Situated between mountains or mountain ranges, e.g. the high plateaus lying between the eastern and western ranges of the Andes.
International Date Line
A line of longitude generally 180 degrees east and west of the Prime Meridian. The date is one day earlier to the east of the line.
international waters
interpolation
In geographic information science, the estimation of the values of spatially dependent variables at unsampled points based on known values of surrounding points, under the assumption that any unknown quantity can be calculated based on its distance to each surrounding quantity. Interpolation techniques such as spline and kriging are commonly raster operations, but can also be applied in vector environments using a triangulated irregular network to model a surface.
interruption
Any place where the contiguous geographic area represented in a map projection has been split, separating to distant parts of the projection certain features and locations which are in reality much closer to each other, in order to permit the representation of a three-dimensional space on a two-dimensional map. All world maps, for example, have at least one interruption, conventionally along the length of a single meridian, thus forming an east–west boundary despite that the approximately spherical shape of the Earth is continuous, with no such boundaries; features on either side of the interruption, though very close to each other on the actual Earth, are depicted on opposite edges of the map, appearing to be separated by thousands of miles. Some world map projections attempt to reduce distortion of scale by having more than one interruption, which divide the projected area into multiple gores, each with its own central meridian.
intervening opportunity
The existence of a closer, less expensive opportunity for obtaining a good or service, or for a migration destination. Such opportunities lessen the attractiveness of more distant places.
Intracoastal Waterway (ICW)
A system of navigable inland waterway channels, maintained through dredging and sheltered for the most part by a series of linear offshore islands, that follows the Atlantic and Gulf Coasts of the United States more than 4,800 kilometres (3,000 mi) from Boston, Massachusetts, around the southern tip of Florida, to Brownsville, Texas.
inversac
See estavelle.
inverted river delta
island

Any piece of sub-continental land that is entirely surrounded by water; or more generally, any isolated habitat that is surrounded by a different habitat, including different types of land.
island nation
A country or polity whose territory consists primarily or entirely of one or more islands or parts of islands.
isle
See island.
islet
A very small island.
isogonic line
An isopleth of magnetic declination, i.e. a line on a map or chart connecting points on the Earth's surface having equal magnetic declination at a given date.
isometric
Of or having equal measure.
isopleth
Any line on a map connecting places of equal value of some specified variable. The variable may be a physical or natural quantity, such as elevation above sea level (as with contour lines) or temperature (as with isotherms), or a quantity related to social or economic statistics, such as population, wealth, or transport costs.
isostasy

The state of gravitational equilibrium between the Earth's crust and its mantle, such that the crust "floats" at an elevation that depends on its thickness and density. This concept is invoked to explain how different topographic heights can exist at Earth's surface. Isostatic theory maintains that where equilibrium exists at the surface, equal mass must underlie equal surface area, and that the thickness of crustal features and the depth of the world's oceans tend to change over time in order to compensate for the uneven distribution of mass in the lithosphere. For example, the instability of continental margins where high mountains are found adjacent to deep oceanic trenches is explained by the subterranean movement of magma to effect a return to regional equilibrium, a process known as isostatic adjustment.

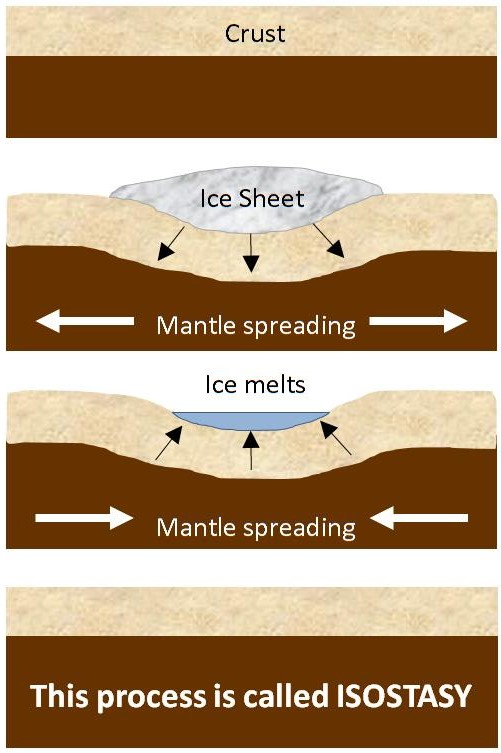
The theory of isostasy explains the phenomena of plate tectonics in terms of the tendency of Earth's crust and mantle to gravitationally balance each other, such that e.g. a change in the mass of the crust results in local displacement of the mantle underlying it.

isthmus
A narrow piece of land connecting two larger land areas across an expanse of water by which they are otherwise separated.

== J ==
jetty
Any man-made structure that projects from land out into a body of water, serving as a breakwater, a walkway, or a landing stage for watercraft, or, in pairs, as a means of constricting a channel.
jhum cultivation

Clear-cutting and/or setting fire to an area of land so it can be used for farm cultivation.
junction
A meeting or intersection of two or more routes of travel, as of roads, rivers, or lines on a map, or a place at which a single route diverges into two or more different routes.
jungle
An area covered with dense vegetation dominated by large trees, often tropical.
jurisdiction
1. The right and power to apply the law in a particular place or within a defined field of responsibility.
2. The geographical area to which such authority applies.
juvenile water

Water present within or derived from the magma of the Earth's mantle and which when brought to the surface by volcanic eruptions is entering the water cycle for the first time (or at least for the first time in millions of years, having previously circulated in the oceans or the atmosphere but becoming subducted beneath the surface and returned to the mantle).

== K ==
kame
An irregularly shaped hill or mound composed of sand, gravel, and glacial till which accumulates in a depression on a retreating glacier and is subsequently deposited on the land surface with further melting of the glacier. Kames are often associated with kettles.

Kames and kettles are just two of the many characteristic landforms created in the wake of a melting glacier.

karre
A furrow or channel varying in depth from a few millimetres to more than a metre, and separated from others by ridges, caused by solution on limestone surfaces.
karst
An area possessing surface topography resulting from the underground solution of subsurface limestone or dolomite.
kettle

A shallow, sediment-filled body of water formed by blocks of ice calving from a retreating glacier, or by draining floodwaters.
key
See cay.
key col
kill

A river, stream, strait, or tidal inlet. The term is used primarily in areas of Dutch influence in the northeastern United States.
knickpoint

1. A point of abrupt inflection in the longitudinal profile of a river or its channel or valley, such as occurs at a waterfall.
2. Any interruption or break in the character of a slope.
knob
A peak or projection from the top of a hill or mountain, or any rounded protrusion of land, especially a small but prominent or isolated hill with steep sides; a boulder or an area of resistant rock protruding from the side of a hill or mountain. The term is used primarily in the southern United States.
knoll
See hillock.
kolk

1. A violently rotating underwater vortex capable of plucking and scouring depressions in bedrock, which may leave behind distinct pits or lakes known as rock-cut basins or potholes.
2. Another name for a bog pond.
kopje
See tor.
krai
In Russia and other Slavic countries, a generic term for a region, historically and politically reserved for border regions in particular, and variously translated as march, frontier, or territory. The term is cognate with the name of Ukraine.
kriging

In geostatistics, an interpolation technique in which, for a given spatially dependent variable, a predicted value for an unmeasured location is derived by weighting the surrounding measured values based on the distance between them and to the unmeasured location, as well as the overall spatial arrangement of the measured points. Widely used in GIS applications, kriging is based on regionalized variable theory, which assumes that the spatial variation in the data being modeled is homogeneous across the surface.
kum
A sandy desert of Central Asia, roughly equivalent to the Saharan erg.
kyle
In Scotland, a narrow channel or strait between two islands, or between an island and the mainland.

== L ==
lacustrine
Of or pertaining to a lake; formed by or deposited in a lake.
lacustrine plain
A nearly level land area formed by the infilling of a lake with sediment and the complete drainage or evaporation of water from the lake, leaving the deposited sediments behind.
lagoon
A small area of water connected to the ocean but otherwise blockaded by one or more islands.
lahar

A flowing mixture of water and debris (intermediate between a volcanic avalanche and a water flood) that forms on the slopes of a volcano.
lake
A body of water localized in a basin and surrounded entirely by land. Lakes are often defined as separate from any river or stream that serves to feed or drain them.
land bridge
Any piece of land connecting larger land areas that are otherwise separated by water, especially one over which living organisms, such as terrestrial animals and plants, are able to cross and thereby colonize previously inaccessible lands. Land bridges may be created by falling sea levels, tectonic activity, or post-glacial rebound. Compare isthmus.

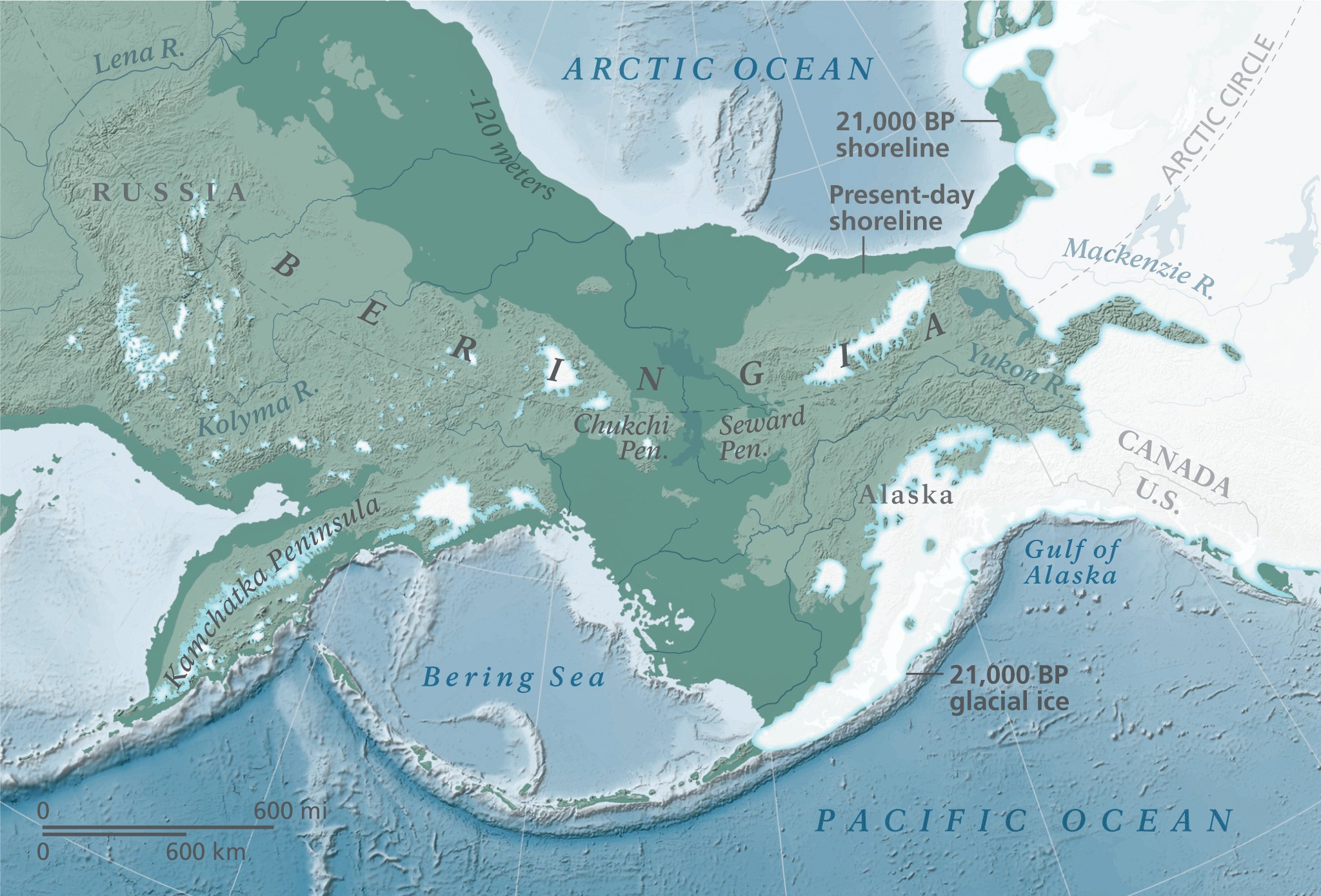
A map of the hypothetical Beringia land bridge thought to have connected Asia and North America about 21,000 years ago, during the Last Glacial Maximum

land cover
The physical material present on the surface of the Earth, including categories such as vegetation (grasslands, shrubs, forests, etc.), bare ground, water, asphalt and artificial surfaces, and many others.
land-fast ice
See fast ice.
landform
A natural feature of the solid surface of the Earth. A combined set of landforms makes up the terrain of a given area, and their arrangement in a landscape is known as topography.
landlocked
1. (of a country or other polity, or a geographical region) Completely surrounded by land and thus lacking a marine coastline; having no territory directly connected to or bordering the ocean.
2. (of a property or parcel of land) Completely surrounded by privately owned property and having no access to a public road.
landmark
Any natural or artificial feature that is recognizable enough to be used for navigation; a feature that stands out enough from its environment to be visible across long distances.
landmass
Any large contiguous area of land typically surrounded by an ocean or sea. Compare continent.
landscape
1. A broad or distinct area of land consisting of a collection of landforms which define a general geomorphologic form or setting, e.g. a mountain range, valley, plain, coast, etc. Landforms within a landscape are spatially associated but may vary in formation processes and age.
2. The visible features of an area of land, its landforms, and how they integrate with natural or man-made features. In the broadest sense, landscapes may include geophysical landforms such as hills and mountains; bodies of water such as rivers, lakes, and the sea; living elements of land cover such as vegetation; human elements such as buildings, structures, and various forms of land use; and transitory elements such as lighting and weather conditions. They reflect both physical origins and the cultural overlay of human presence in a living synthesis of people and place.
landscape studies
A branch of geography which examines the structure and organization of landscapes, focusing on landscapes as the settings for cultural and ecological patterns, processes, and histories, as well as on the social and cultural evolution of landscapes, including the ways in which they shape and are shaped by human societies and the interrelationships between place-making and personal and social memory.
landslide

A sudden mass movement of earth from a hill, mountain, or cliff, in which displaced material slides, flows, falls, or collapses under the force of gravity yet often retains form as it moves; or the visible evidence of this movement after the displaced material has come to rest. Landslides may have many causes, though they are commonly associated with heavy precipitation, underground aquifers, wave action, and earthquakes.
land-tied island
See tied island.
lateral blast
A sideways-directed explosion from the side or summit of a volcano.
lateral moraine
latitude
A measure of distance north or south of the Equator. One degree of latitude equals approximately 111 kilometers (69 mi). Lines of latitude, also called circles of latitude or parallels, are the imaginary lines that cross the surface of the Earth in an east-west direction (parallel to the Equator) and measure how far north or south of the Equator a place is located.
lava
The term used for magma once it has erupted onto the Earth's surface.
layer of no motion
In oceanography, a hypothetical layer at some depth in the ocean within which the water is assumed to be at rest, implying that the isobaric surfaces within that layer are level and hence that such surfaces can be used as points of reference when calculating absolute-gradient currents.
lea
A pasture, meadow, or grassy field.
leaching
A process of soil nutrient removal through the erosive movement and chemical action of water.
lee
The side or slope of a physical feature (such as a hill or mountain) which faces downwind, i.e. away from the direction in which the wind is blowing, or which faces away from an advancing glacier or ice sheet. The lee side is often sheltered by the topography from exposure to the wind and any moisture it brings.
leeward
Toward the lee side; sheltered from the wind; the direction downwind from a point of reference. Contrast windward.
legend
A key for understanding the meanings of the symbols or pictures on a map.
levee

An elongated naturally occurring ridge or an artificially constructed wall or barrier which regulates water levels in areas prone to flooding. It is usually earthen and often parallel to the course of a river or a coastline.
lithosphere
The Earth's hard, outermost shell. It comprises the crust and the upper part of the mantle. It is divided into a mosaic of 16 major slabs or plates, which are known as lithospheric plates or tectonic plates.
lithospheric plates
See tectonic plates.
loam
A type of easily worked, highly fertile soil composed of clay, silt, and sand in an approximate ratio of 20:40:40. Loams generally heat rapidly, are well-aerated, and drain neither too quickly nor too slowly.
localism
A movement or philosophy that prioritizes local or small-scale politics, issues, and values over regional or broader concerns, rejecting things like centralized government and economic outsourcing in favor of local production and consumption of goods, local control of government, and the promotion of local history, local culture, and local identity.
localization
The set of processes by which social, cultural, economic, or other activities become embedded in specific places or locations, rather than in alternative places or across many places, either in contrast to or as a related aspect of globalization. In the former sense localization may be deliberately practiced as a form of resistance to globalization through the promotion of increased local control, self-government, and economic self-sufficiency. See also deglobalization.
location
A particular point or place in physical space. Compare absolute location.
location theory
A group of theories which seek to explain the siting of economic activities in particular locations.
loess
A soil made up of small particles that were transported by the wind to their present location.
longitude
A measure of distance east or west of the Prime Meridian, a line drawn between the North and South Poles and passing through the Royal Observatory at Greenwich, England. Lines of longitude, also called meridians, are the imaginary lines that cross the surface of the Earth in a north-south direction (parallel to the Prime Meridian) and measure how far east or west of the Prime Meridian a place is located.
longshore drift

A geological process by which sediment is transported along a coast parallel to the shoreline due to incoming wind-driven waves meeting the shore at an oblique angle; this generates a water current which moves unidirectionally along the shore within the surf zone. A well-known example occurs on sandy beaches when breaking waves send swash up the beach at an angle but gravity drains the backwash straight downslope, perpendicular to the shoreline, causing the same sand particles to gradually move down the beach over multiple cycles. The same process occurs at many different scales and affects all sediment sizes, and can vary with the wind direction even at the same location.

A diagram of longshore drift

lowland
Any area of land that is lower in elevation relative to another area. The term is often used as a conditional descriptor to distinguish related habitats or ecosystems, especially freshwater riparian areas, on the basis of elevation above sea level. Lowland areas are usually relatively flat and characterized by slow-flowing waterways and alluvial plains. Contrast highland and upland.

== M ==
maar
A broad, shallow, flat-bottomed volcanic crater created by an eruption involving groundwater coming into contact with magma. Maars commonly have low rims and subtle relief and characteristically fill with water to form crater lakes.
machair
A fertile, low-lying, grassy plain on the northwest coasts of Ireland and Scotland.
magma
Molten rock containing liquids, crystals, and dissolved gases that forms within the upper part of the Earth's mantle and crust. When erupted onto the Earth's surface, it is called lava.
magmatic water
See juvenile water.
magnetic anomaly
A local deviation from the predicted value of the Earth's magnetic field, due either to the presence of rocks formed in past geological eras which have preserved internal magnetizations that differ from modern magnetic alignments, or to local abundances or deficiencies of ferromagnetic minerals.
magnetic declination

The angle on the horizontal plane between magnetic north and true north. Because compass needles always point to magnetic north, and because the Magnetic North Pole and the Geographic North Pole are not in precisely the same location, the north direction indicated by a compass may be slightly different from the direction of geographic north, depending on the user's location on the Earth. The user can compensate for this discrepancy by adding the known declination angle for their location to the magnetic bearing reported by their compass, yielding the true bearing with respect to true north.
magnetic dip

The angle made with the horizontal by the Earth's magnetic field lines. Locations in the Northern Hemisphere usually have positive values of inclination, indicating that the magnetic field is angled downward, into the Earth; the angle increases as one approaches the North Magnetic Pole, where the field lines point vertically downward, perpendicular to the horizontal. Locations in the Southern Hemisphere usually have negative inclination, indicating that the field lines are angled upward, away from the Earth, with the maximum angle located at the South Magnetic Pole. Dip angle is in principle the angle made by the needle of a vertically held compass, though in practice ordinary compass needles may be deliberately weighted against dip, or may be unable to move freely in the correct plane. Magnetic dip can be measured more reliably with a dip circle.
magnetic meridian
magnetic north
The direction a compass points, towards the Magnetic North Pole. Magnetic north differs from true north and grid north.
magnetic pole
Either of the two poles of the Earth's true magnetic field – the Magnetic North Pole or the Magnetic South Pole.
magnetic variation
See magnetic declination.
main stem

The primary downstream channel of a river, as contrasted with its tributaries. Virtually all of the water in a river's drainage basin eventually flows through the main stem.
mainfall
See grade.
mainland
A term used to denote a contiguous landmass or political territory relative to its politically associated but geographically remote outlying territories. It is variously used to refer to the continental (i.e. non-insular) part of a polity relative to its exclaves or oceanic islands; or to the largest or most politically, economically, and/or demographically significant island within an island nation. For example, continental Europe is often considered "the mainland" relative to the British Isles, while the island of Great Britain is considered "the mainland" relative to Northern Ireland and the many smaller islands that constitute the United Kingdom.
makhtesh
A deep, closed valley (usually drained by a single wadi) surrounded by steep walls of resistant rock and superficially resembling a crater. The term is used primarily in the deserts of Israel and Egypt.
mammilated
Smooth and rounded in appearance, used of various landforms of different sizes from individual rocks to entire landscapes.
mantle
The layer of the Earth's interior between the crust and the core, consisting of ultrabasic rock which is predominantly solid under the immense pressure of overlying rock but behaves as a viscous fluid over geological time scales or if this pressure is relieved (as with magma penetrating the crust). The mantle is about 2,900 kilometers (1,800 mi) thick, making up 84% of the Earth's volume and 67% of its mass. The uppermost sub-layer is known as the asthenosphere; the lithosphere is composed of the topmost 65–70 kilometres (40–43 mi) of the mantle and the crust.
map
A picture of a place drawn at an established scale on a two-dimensional plane surface, often depicting natural and manmade features on or under the surface of the Earth or other planetary body, typically with the features positioned as accurately as possible relative to a coordinate reference system. More generally, a map is any graphical representation of locative information about the relative positions of particular features within a space or place.
map index

A graphical key identifying the relationships between the individual maps of a map series, their coverage areas, and/or their production status or availability. Index maps enable users to find a map or set of maps covering a particular region of interest by overlaying a grid or a set of rectangles on a map of a larger geographical area. Each grid unit or rectangle is labeled with a name or number corresponding to a specific map sheet which depicts the indicated area in greater detail.
map projection
A systematic transformation of the latitudes and longitudes of locations from the surface of a three-dimensional shape, such as a sphere or an ellipsoid, into locations on a two-dimensional plane. Maps of locations on the Earth require map projections to represent features in a convenient format that is easy to view and interpret, though all map projections necessarily distort the true properties of the Earth's surface to some degree.
map series
A group of topographic or thematic map sheets usually having the same scale and cartographic specifications and collectively identified by the publisher or producing agency as belonging to the same group.
map sheet
An individual map or chart printed on a single page or sheet of paper, either complete in itself or part of a map series.
mapping
The process of designing, drawing, or creating a map. The term is used in particular to refer to the application of cartographic techniques in order to make planimetric or topographic maps, but may also be used for any map, and in the broadest sense may refer to the gathering of geographical data of any kind.
march

A boundary, frontier, or borderland, as opposed to an interior heartland. In medieval Europe, a march was the land surrounding a border between realms, or a neutral buffer zone under the joint control of two or more realms with conflicting laws or territorial claims.
margin
1. The line or edge along which the surface of a body of water meets the land.
2. In property law, the boundary of a piece of land which is bounded by a stream or watercourse, often with the center of the stream or the thalweg defining the legal boundary.
3. The mostly blank, unused space lying beyond the neatline of a map and completely surrounding the map area. See also surround.
marginal land
Land that is of low agricultural value because any crops produced from it would be worth the same or less than the costs paid to produce them, either because the rights or improvements required to cultivate it are very expensive, or the market prices for the crops are very low, or for any other reason. A change in economic conditions may allow formerly marginal lands to become profitable again.
marginal sea
1. A sea or other large area of the ocean that is partially enclosed by land and/or submarine ridges yet still adjacent to, widely open to, and connected to the larger ocean at the surface; e.g. the Yellow Sea and Hudson Bay.
2.

Those waters along a nation's coast within which the nation has exclusive jurisdiction except for the right of innocent passage of foreign vessels. See also territorial waters.
marine
1. Of, relating to, found in, or produced by the sea or ocean.
2. Of or relating to shipping or navigation, particularly by watercraft.
maritime climate
A climate strongly influenced by an oceanic environment, typically found on islands and the windward shores of continents. It is characterized by small daily and yearly temperature variation and high relative humidity.
market orientation
The tendency of a firm or industry to be located close to wherever demand for the commodities it produces is strongest.
marsh
A type of wetland dominated by herbaceous rather than woody plant species and often found at the edges of lakes and streams, where it forms a transition between aquatic and terrestrial ecosystems.
Massenerhebung effect
massif
1. Any section of the Earth's crust which is demarcated by faults or flexures and tends to retain its internal structure while being displaced as a whole.
2. A single large mountain mass or compact group of connected mountains forming an independent portion of a mountain range.
mayen
In Switzerland and the Central Alps, a large shelf or ledge, intermediate between high alpine meadows and valley floors, where cattle are allowed to rest briefly during their annual movements between summer and winter pasture.
mean sea level (MSL)
The average sea level of one or more of the Earth's coastal bodies of water, such as oceans and seas, or at a particular location, from which heights such as elevation and altitude are measured.
meander
One of a series of regular sinuous curves, bends, loops, turns, or windings in the main channel of a river, stream, or other watercourse. Meanders are produced by the repetitive upstream erosion and downstream deposition of sediments along the banks of a watercourse as the water flows back and forth across the axis of a valley or floodplain.
meander cutoff
The process by which the strip of land separating the two closest parts of a meandering river or stream channel is breached by the river's flow, forming a new, shorter channel that effectively "shortcuts" the loop of the meander and causes it to be gradually abandoned until it is completely isolated from the main flow. The river's course suddenly becomes much straighter, and the abandoned meander often forms a slackwater or an oxbow lake, or becomes loaded with sediment and dries up entirely, leaving visible traces of the former channel.

A meander cutoff occurs when a river erodes through the neck of a pronounced meander, creating a "shortcut" that isolates the meander loop from the river's main channel.

meander neck
The narrow strip of land separating the river on each side of a well-developed meander. If this strip is completely eroded away, a cutoff occurs. See also neck.
meander scar

A typically crescent-shaped incision in a bluff or valley wall formed by the remnants of a dry, abandoned meander.
medial moraine

The morainic debris lying centrally in a line across the surface of a glacier, formed when the lateral moraines of two confluent glaciers meet.
median line
medical geography
A branch of human geography that studies the geographical aspects of health and the provision of healthcare, examining the spatial distribution of human diseases, mortality, morbidity, and the environmental factors conducive to human health and illness.
Mediterranean climate
Any climate characterized by mild, rainy winters and hot, dry summers, as experienced in the Mediterranean Basin.
megacity
A very large city, typically with a population of at least 10 million people. Precise definitions vary, but criteria are usually based on total population and/or population density.
megafan
An exceptionally large alluvial fan, variously defined as being more than 100 kilometres (62 mi) long from apex to toe or having a surface area of more than 10,000 square kilometres (3,900 sq mi).
megalopolis
A chain of roughly adjacent metropolitan areas which have merged into a very large and heavily populated urban complex. See also conurbation and metropolitan coalescence.
megaregion
meilograph
See opisometer.
meltwater

Water (usually freshwater) derived from the melting of snow or ice, including seasonal snowfall, glacial ice, icebergs, and ice shelves over the ocean.
mental map
The conception of an actual geographic space as it exists within a person's mind; an imagined "map" of the spatial relationships and orientations of physical objects and locations within the real-world environment, reflecting the knowledge and prejudices of the individual and characteristic of the way the individual acquires, classifies, stores, retrieves, and interprets geographic information.
Mercator projection

A conformal cylindrical map projection in which the equator is represented by a straight line true to scale and meridians are represented by parallel straight lines perpendicular to the equator and uniformly spaced according to the distances between them at the equator. Lines of latitude are also represented by a system of straight lines which are perpendicular to all of the meridians and therefore parallel to the equator, though their spacing is not uniform but rather increases with increasing distance from the equator in order to conform with the expanding scale resulting from the parallel representations of the meridians. The standard Mercator projection has long been popular in navigation because it represents north as up and south as down everywhere in the world while preserving local directions and shapes, though it also greatly inflates the size of objects near the geographic poles.
mere
A shallow pond, lake, or wetland. The term is used primarily in Great Britain and other parts of Western Europe.
mereing
A type of surveying in which boundaries are established with respect to ground features present at the time of the survey, which may include natural features and may or may not remain unchanged over time, e.g. a metes and bounds survey.
meridian
A line of longitude, i.e. any imaginary line connecting points of equal longitude and running perpendicular to all lines of latitude, intersecting them at right angles. Unlike lines of latitude, meridians are all the same length, but are not parallel to each other, instead converging at the geographic poles. Each meridian is half of a great circle drawn on the Earth's surface; the other half, connecting all of the meridian's antipodes, is termed an antimeridian. Meridians are numbered according to their longitudinal measure in angular degrees (further subdivided into minutes and seconds) up to 180 degrees east or west of an arbitrarily designated zero or prime meridian, by convention the International Reference Meridian.
meridional
Of, relating to, or characteristic of the south, especially of the inhabitants of a southern region or territory, in particular southern Europe. Contrast septentrional.
mesa
An isolated, relatively flat-topped natural elevation, usually more extensive than a butte but less extensive than a plateau.
metamorphic rock
Rock that has been physically altered by heat and/or pressure.
metes and bounds
A system of land survey that defines parcels of land according to visible natural landscape features and distance. The resultant field pattern is usually very irregular in shape.
metropole
The homeland or central territory from which a colonial empire governs, as opposed to its colonies or overseas territories.
metropolis
A large city or conurbation which is considered a significant economic, political, or cultural center for a country or geographic region and/or an important hub for regional or international connections and communications.
metropolitan area

A region consisting of one or more densely populated urban cores (often a metropolis) and its less populous surrounding territories, including satellite cities, towns, and intervening rural areas, all of which are socioeconomically tied to the core as typically measured by commuting patterns. A metropolitan area usually comprises multiple neighborhoods, jurisdictions, and municipalities, with its inhabitants sharing industry, housing, and many other forms of infrastructure.
metropolitan coalescence
The merging of the urbanized parts of separate metropolitan areas; a megalopolis is a result of this process.
metropolitan state
migration
The movement of people, animals, or other living organisms from one place to another.
mire
See bog.
mogote
An isolated, rounded, steep-sided hill composed of either limestone, marble, or dolomite and surrounded by nearly flat alluvial plains, especially as found in tropical regions.
Mohorovičić discontinuity

The boundary between the Earth's crust and the mantle, as defined by the abrupt change in velocity of seismic P waves traveling across this boundary, which occurs as the waves pass through different densities of rock.
mole
A long, massive, man-made stone or earthen structure used as a pier or breakwater, or as a causeway between places separated by water, but designed to prevent the free movement of water underneath it (unlike a true pier).
monadnock
See inselberg.
montane
Of or pertaining to a mountain or mountains; mountainous; occurring at high elevation. The term is used in particular to describe biomes or ecological communities occupying cool, humid zones at or near timberline. See also alpine.
monticule
A secondary cone on the side of a larger volcano, or any small mountain or large hill.
moor

An upland habitat and ecoregion characterized by low-growing vegetation on acidic soils and generally referring to uncultivated hills but also including low-lying wetlands.
moraine
The rocks and soil carried and deposited by a glacier. A terminal moraine, either a ridge or low hill running perpendicular to the direction of ice movement, is often visible near the end of a retreating glacier, indicating the glacier's maximum advance.
moulin
A vertical, cylindrical shaft, up to 25–30 metres (82–98 ft) deep, by which surface meltwater flows into a glacier, usually formed at lines of structural weakness in the ice.
mound
Any heaped pile of earth, gravel, sand, rocks, or debris, typically with a rounded top and of topographically higher elevation than its immediate surroundings.
mountain
A large landform that rises prominently above the surrounding land in a limited area, usually in the form of a rocky peak with great vertical relief; a mountain is generally considered steeper than a hill. Mountains are formed by volcanic or tectonic forces and erode slowly through the actions of rivers, glaciers, and weathering. Most exist within extensive mountain ranges.
mountain pass
A navigable route through a mountain range or over a ridge, often crossing a saddle.
mountain range
A series of neighboring mountains or hills, often closely arranged in a line and connected by high ground. Individual mountains within the same mountain range are usually the result of the same orogeny, and often (though not always) share a common form, alignment, and geology.
mouth
1. The place where a river or stream flows into another body of water, such as a lake or another river but especially a sea or ocean. Deltas and estuaries occur near the mouths of rivers.
2. The lower or downstream end or the most accessible entrance of a valley, canyon, ravine, or cave.
mudflat

A type of coastal wetland consisting of exposed layers of bay mud formed by the deposition of silts, clays, and marine animal detritus by tides or rivers. Mudflats usually form within the intertidal zone of relatively sheltered areas such as bays and lagoons.
mudflow
See lahar.
multicultural
Of, pertaining to, or including multiple distinct cultures.
multilingual
The ability to use more than one language when speaking or writing. This term often refers to the presence of more than two populations of significant size within a single political unit, each group speaking a different language as their primary language.
municipal corporation
The legal term for a government body at the local level, including but not necessarily limited to cities, counties, towns, townships, villages, and boroughs.
municipality
A type of general-purpose urban administrative subdivision having corporate status and powers of self-government or jurisdiction as granted by national and/or state laws to which it is subordinate. Municipalities are often included within but usually distinguished from larger administrative divisions such as counties, though the nature of their territorial boundaries and political jurisdictions can vary considerably in different parts of the world.
muskeg
Another name for a bog, used primarily in Alaska and western Canada.

== See also ==
- Index of geography articles
- Outline of geography

== Notes ==
Much of this material was copied from U.S. government works which are in the public domain because they are not eligible for copyright protection.
