= River channel migration =

Geomorphological process

Meandering of the Ucayali River in Peru

River channel migration is the geomorphological process that involves the lateral migration of an alluvial river channel across its floodplain. This process is mainly driven by the combination of bank erosion and point bar deposition over time. When referring to river channel migration, it is typically in reference to meandering streams. In braided streams, channel change is driven by sediment transport.

It has been proposed that lateral migration is a particularly dominant erosive process in savanna landscapes.

== Physical processes ==
=== Bank erosion ===
As flow enters the bank of an alluvial river, the centrifugal force created by the bend instigates helicoidal flow, a corkscrew like pattern of flow, which drives the hydraulic action acting on the opposing bank. This is where the primary process in river channel migration of bank erosion occurs. Often the bank is undercut, another result of the helicoidal flow, which leads to the creation of cut banks. Factors that limit the rate of bank erosion include the rate of deposition of the point bar, stream power, and the critical shear stress of the stream bed.

=== Point bar deposition ===
The sediment taken from the bank during the process of bank erosion is deposited on the opposing side of the channel fueling the process called point bar deposition. The helicoidal flow also plays a role in this process by acting as a cross channel component that moves the sediment to the other side. The processes of point bar deposition and bank erosion are intertwined and in most cases the erosion rate of cut banks is equal to the deposition rate of point bars. In addition, point bars act as topographic obstructions once formed that further drive flow into the opposite bank, creating a positive feedback loop. This leads to the meanders of an alluvial river becoming more well defined over time.

== Characteristic features ==
Typical features found in river channel migration are point bars, cut banks, meanders, floodplains, and oxbow lakes.

== Measurement and modeling ==
Techniques used for measuring river channel migration vary among different time scales. Over long time scales, sedimentological evidence, botanical evidence, and historical sources are utilized. Over intermediate time scales, planimetric resurveying and repeated cross profiting are utilized. Over short time scales, terrestrial photogrammetry and erosion pins are utilized.

In order to model river channel migrations over time, orthogonal functions of erosion path lines can be generated for individual point bar complexes. The orthogonal functions can be used to directly indicate the paths that channels could take in lateral migrations. The modeling of meander patterns can be useful in a variety of physical applications.
