= Slip-off slope =

Depositional landform on the inside convex bank of a meandering river

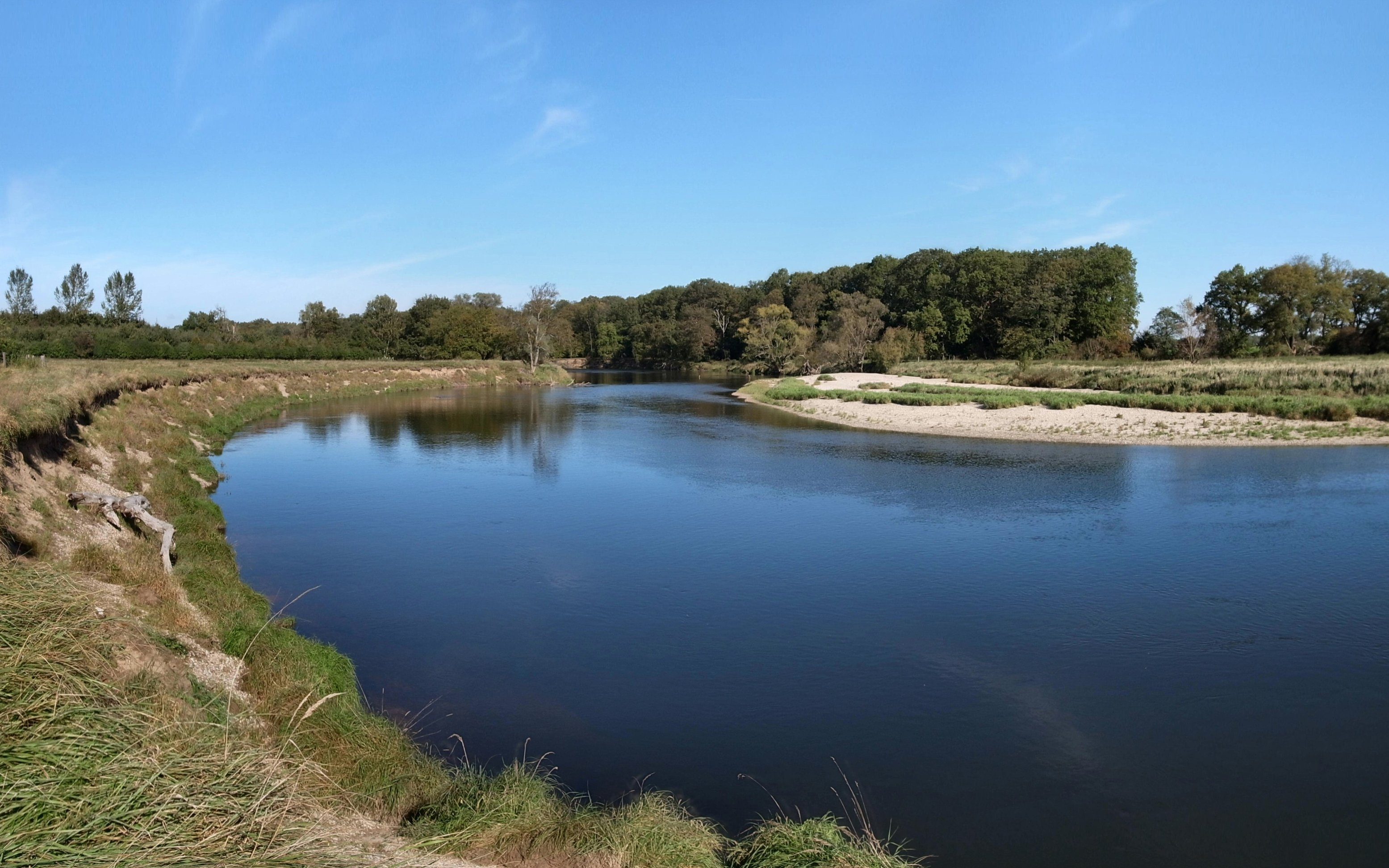
Slip-off slope (right) and cut bank.

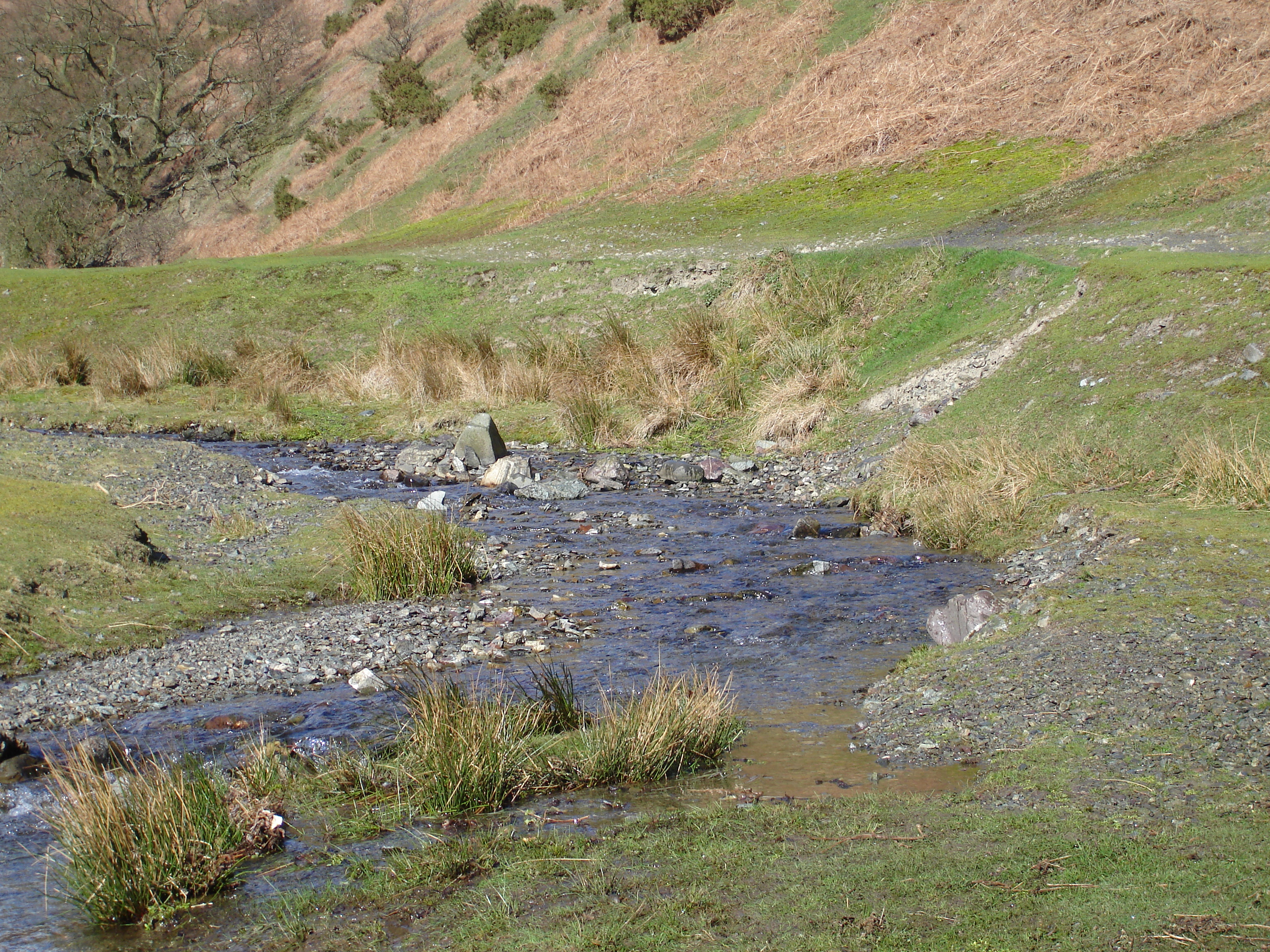
The depositional slip-off slope is on the left and a small river cliff on the right. River Ashes Hollow, UK.

Schematic cross section of a meandering river channel showing slip-off slope formation

A slip-off slope is a depositional landform that occurs on the inside convex bank of a meandering river. The term can refer to two different features: one in a freely meandering river with a floodplain and the other in an entrenched river.

== In freely meandering rivers ==
In a freely meandering river, a slip-off slope is characterized by a gentle slope composed of sand and pebbles on the inside convex bank of a meander loop, across the channel from a cut bank or river-cut cliff. As water in a meandering river travels around a bend, it moves in a secondary corkscrew-like flow as it travels downstream, in a pattern called helicoidal flow. This phenomenon causes increased water velocity in the outside bend of the meander, driving lateral bank erosion. It is also responsible for slower water velocity on the inner bend of the meander. This low velocity allows eroded sediments from the cut bank side to be deposited on the inner bank. The deposition of material at the toe of a slip-off slope often results in the formation of a point bar. Geologically, the environment in which a slip-off slope is deposited is considered to be one of low energy.

This continual process of erosion of the outer bank and deposition on the inside bank causes the migration of meanders and formation of oxbow lakes as the meander necks are narrowed and eventually cut through by the river. Because they are low-lying, slip-off slopes are easily inundated during high water events, contributing to floodplain evolution in the middle and lower courses of a river.

== In entrenched rivers ==
The slip-off slope of an entrenched meander is a gently sloping bedrock surface that rises from the inside, concave bank of an asymmetrically entrenched river. A thin, discontinuous layer of alluvium often covers this gently sloping bedrock surface. This type of slip-off slope is formed by the contemporaneous migration of a meander as a river cuts downward into bedrock. A terrace on the slip-off slope of a meander spur, known as slip-off slope terrace, can be formed by a brief halt during the irregular incision by an actively meandering river.

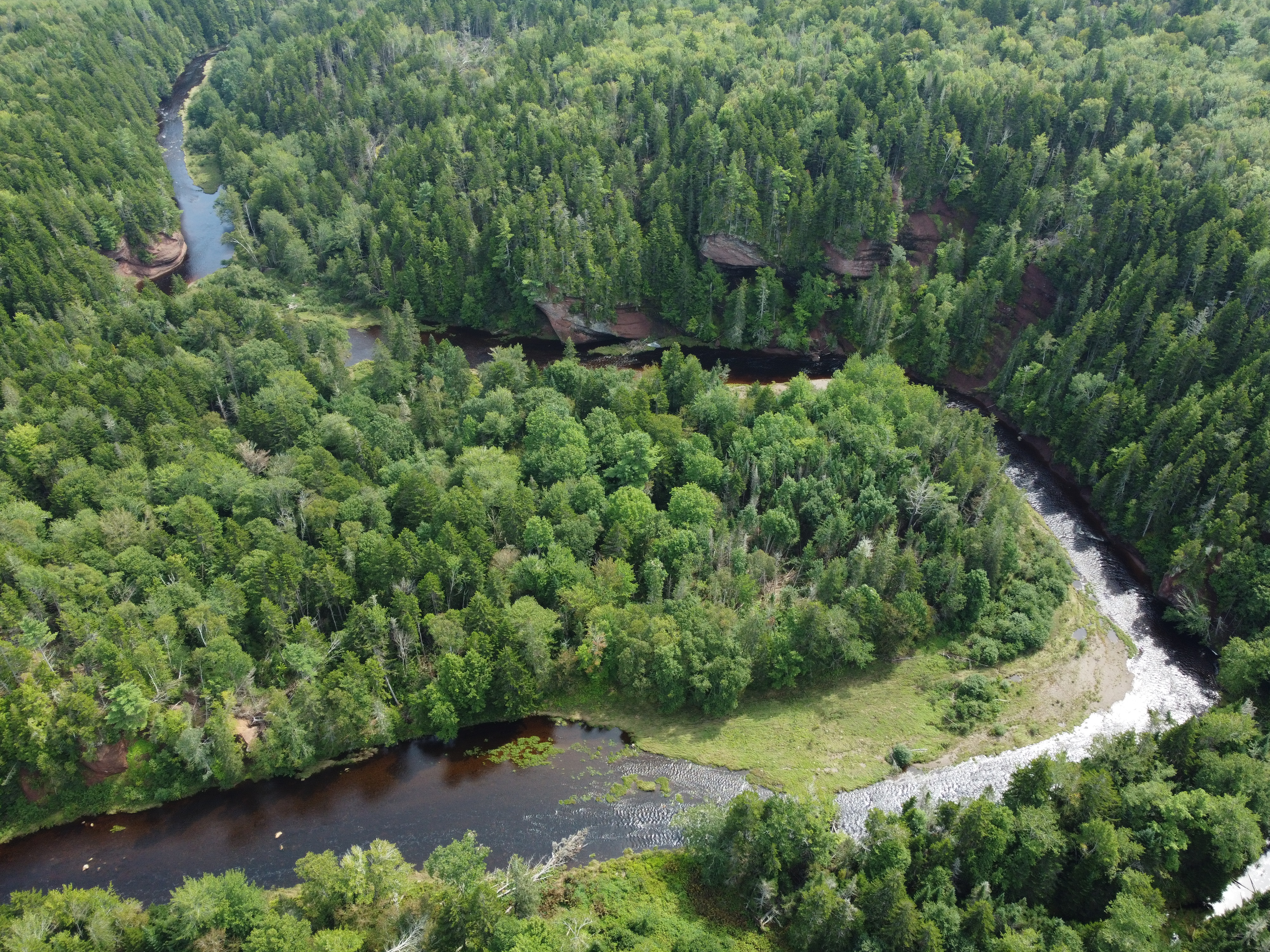
Aerial photograph of a meander on the Economy River, Nova Scotia. The gravel area on the inside of the meander near the centre-right of the image is a slip-off slope.

== See also ==
- Deposition (geology)
- Meander cutoff
