= Alluvial river =

Type of river

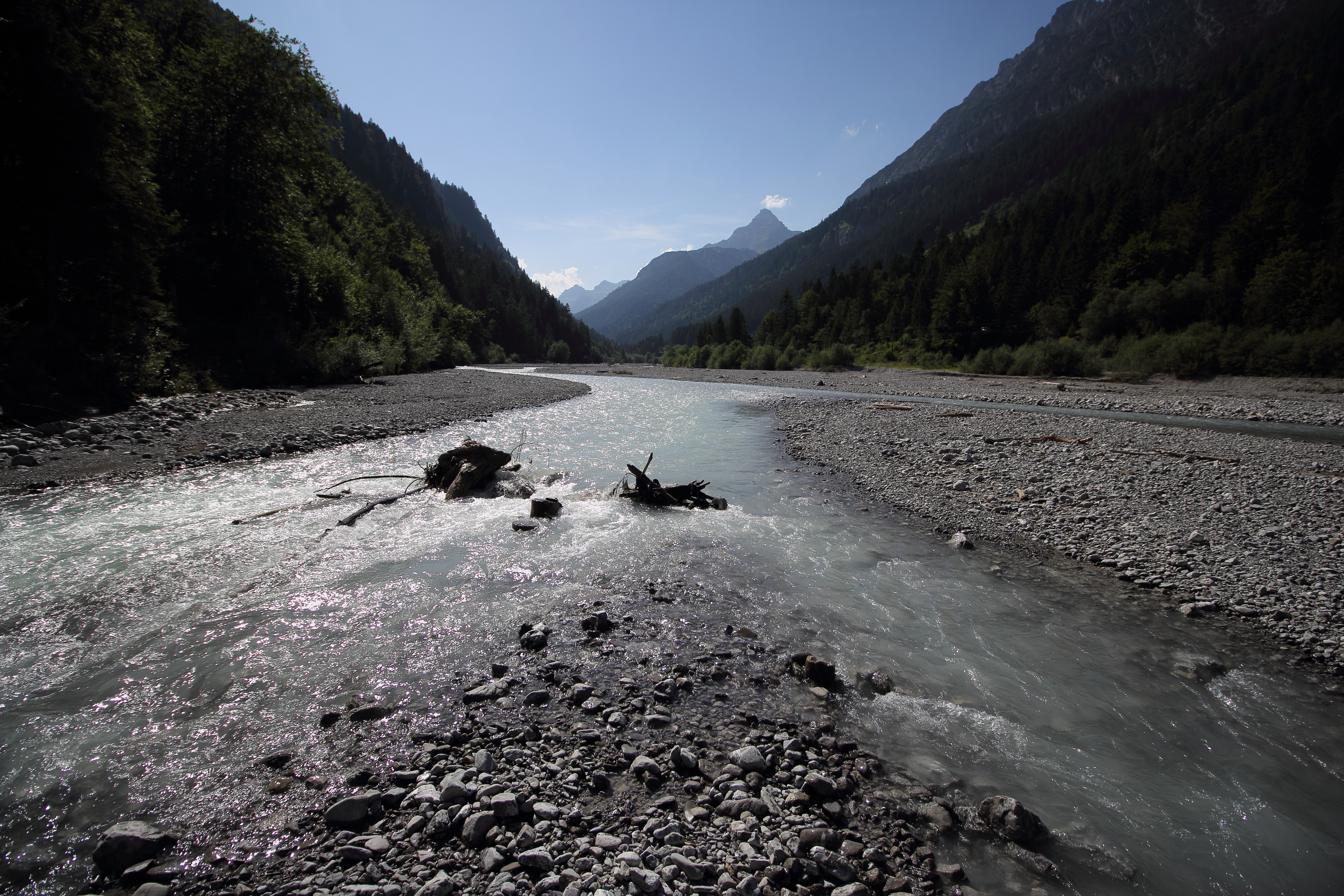
Alluvial river in Austria

An alluvial river is one in which the bed and stream banks are made up of mobile sediment or soil. Alluvial rivers are self-formed, meaning that their channels are shaped by the magnitude and frequency of the floods that they experience, and the ability of these floods to erode, deposit, and transport sediment. For this reason, alluvial rivers can assume a number of forms based on the properties of their banks; the flows they experience; the local riparian ecology; and the amount, size, and type of sediment that they carry.

At a smaller spatial scale and shorter time scale, the patterns of water movement, from events such as seasonal flooding, create different patches of soils that range from aerobic to anaerobic and have differing nutrients and decomposition rates and dynamics. When looking at larger spatial scales, the topographic features have been created by glacial events, such as glaciation and deglaciation, changes in sea-levels, tectonic movements, and other events that occur over longer time scales. These short and long-term scales together determine the patterns and characteristics of alluvial rivers. These rivers also consist of certain topographic features that include hillslopes at the formation of the valley's sides, terraces, remains of old floodplains at higher elevations than the floodplain that is currently active, levees that are natural, meander scrolls, natural drainage channels, and floodplains that are temporary, as well as permanent.

== Alluvial channel patterns ==
Natural alluvial channels have a variety of morphological patterns, but can be generally described as straight, meandering, braided, or anastomosing. Different channel patterns result from differences in bankfull discharge, gradient, sediment supply, and bank material. Channel patterns can be described based on their level of sinuosity, which is the ratio of the channel length measured along its center to the straight line distance measured down the valley axis.

=== Straight/sinuous channels ===
Straight channels (sinuosity <1.3) are relatively rare in natural systems due to the fact that sediment and flow are rarely distributed evenly across a landscape. Irregularities in the deposition and erosion of sediments leads to the formation of alternate bars that are on opposite sides of the channel in succession. Alternating bar sequences result in flow to be directed in a sinuous pattern, leading to the formation of sinuous channels (sinuosity of 1.3-1.5).

=== Meandering channels ===
Meandering channels are more sinuous (>1.5 sinuosity) than straight or sinuous channels, and are defined by the meander wavelength morphological unit. The meander wavelength is the distance from the apex of one bend to the next on the same side of the channel. Meandering channels wavelength are described in section 1.2 Geomorphic Units. Meandering channels are widespread in current times, but no geomorphic evidence of their existence before the evolution of land plants has been found. This is largely attributed to the effect of vegetation in increasing bank stability and maintaining meander formation.

=== Braided channels ===
Braided channels are characterized by multiple, active streams within a broad, low sinuosity channel. The smaller strands of streams diverge around sediment bars and then converge in a braiding pattern. Braided channels are dynamic, with strands moving within the channel. Braided channels are caused by sediment loads that exceed the capacity of stream transport. They are found downstream of glaciers and mountain slopes in conditions of high slope, variable discharge, and high loads of coarse sediment.

=== Anastomosing channels ===
Anastomosing channels are similar to braided channels in that they are composed of complex strands that diverge and then converge downstream. However, anastomosing channels are distinct from braided channels in that they flow around relatively stable, typically vegetated islands. They also have generally lower gradients, are narrower and deeper, and have more permanent strands.

== Geomorphic units ==
=== Meander wavelength ===
The meander wavelength or alternate bar sequence is considered the primary ecological and morphological unit of meandering alluvial rivers. The meander wavelength is composed of two alternating bar units, each with a pool scoured out from a cutbank, an aggradational lobe or point bar, and a riffle that connects the pool and point bar. In an idealized channel, the meander wavelength is around 10 to 11 channel widths. This equates to pools (and riffles and point bars) being separated by an average of 5 to 6 channel widths. The radius of curvature of a meander bend describes the tightness of a meander arc, and is measured by the radius of a circle that fits the meander arc. The radius of curvature is between 2 and 3 times the channel width.

== Landforms ==
=== Floodplains ===
Floodplains are the land areas adjacent to alluvial river channels that are frequently flooded. Floodplains are built up by deposition of suspended load from overbank flow, bedload deposition from lateral river migration, and landscape processes such as landslides.

=== Natural levees ===
Natural levees occur when the floodplain of an alluvial river is primarily shaped by overbank deposition and when relatively coarse materials are deposited near the main channel. The natural levees become higher than the adjacent floodplain, leading to the formation of backswamps and yazoo channels, in which tributary streams are forced to flow parallel to the main channel rather than converge with the main channel.

=== Terraces ===
Terraces are sediment storage features that record an alluvial river's past sediment delivery. Many changes in boundary conditions can form terraces in alluvial river systems. The most basic reason for their formation is that the river does not have the transport capacity to move the sediment supplied to it by its watershed. Past climate during the Quaternary has been linked to the aggradation and incision of floodplains, leaving step-like terrace features behind. Uplift as well as sea level retreat can also cause terraces to form as the river cuts into its underlying bed and preserves sediment in its floodplain.

== Geomorphic processes ==
=== Natural hydrograph components ===
Natural hydrograph components such as storm events (floods), baseflows, snowmelt peaks, and recession limbs, are the river-specific catalysts that shape alluvial river ecosystems and provide for important geomorphic and ecological processes. Preserving annual variations in a river's hydrologic regime – patterns of magnitude, duration, frequency, and timing of flows- are essential for sustaining ecological integrity within alluvial river ecosystems.

=== Channel migration ===
Bank erosion at cutbanks on the outside of meanders combined with deposition of point bars on the inside of meanders cause channel migration. The greatest bank erosion often occurs just downstream of the meander apex, causing downstream migration as the high velocity flow eats away at the bank as it is forced around the meander curve. Avulsion is another process of channel migration that occurs much more rapidly than the gradual migration process of cutbank erosion and point bar deposition. Avulsion occurs when lateral migration causes two meanders to become so close that the river bank between them is breached, causing the joining of the meanders and the creation of two channels. When the original channel is cut off from the new channel by the deposition of sediments, oxbow lakes are formed. Channel migration is important to sustaining diverse aquatic and riparian habitats The migration causes sediments and woody debris to enter the river, and creates areas of new floodplain on the inside of the meander.

=== Sediment budgets ===
Dynamic steady states of sediment erosion and deposition work to sustain alluvial channel morphology, as river reaches import and export fine and coarse sediments at approximately equal rates. At the apex of meander curves, high velocity flows scour out sediment and form pools. The mobilized sediment is then deposited at the point bar directly across the channel or downstream. Flows of high magnitude and duration can be seen as important thresholds that drive channelbed mobility. Channel aggradation or degradation indicate sediment budget imbalances.

=== Flooding ===
Flooding is an important component that shapes channel morphology in alluvial river systems. Seasonal flooding also enhances productivity and connectivity of the floodplain. Large floods that exceed the 10 to 20 year recurrence interval form and maintain main channels as well as avulse and form side channels, wetlands, and oxbow lakes. Floodplain inundation occurs on average every 1–2 years at flows above bankfull stage and moderates flood severity and channel scour and helps to cycle nutrients between the river and surrounding landscape. Flooding is important to aquatic and riparian habitat complexity because it forms a diversity of habitat features that vary in their ecosystem function.

== Biologic components ==
=== Riparian habitats ===
Riparian habitats are especially dynamic in alluvial river ecosystems due to the constantly changing fluvial environment. Alternate bar scour, channel migration, floodplain inundation, and channel avulsion create variable habitat conditions that riparian vegetation must adapt to. Seedling establishment and forest stand development depend on favorable substrate, which in turn is dependent on how sediment is sorted along the channel banks. In general, young riparian vegetation and pioneer species will establish in areas that are subjected to active channel processes such as at point bars, where coarser sediments such as gravels and cobbles are present but are seasonally mobilized. Mature riparian vegetation can establish farther upslope where finer sediments such as sands and silts dominate and disturbance from active river processes are less frequent.

=== Aquatic habitats ===
Aquatic habitats in alluvial rivers are sculpted by the complex interplay between sediment, flow, vegetation, and woody debris. Pools provide deeper areas of relatively cool water and provide shelter for fish and other aquatic organisms. Pool habitats are improved by complex structures such as large woody debris or boulders. Riffles provide shallower, highly turbulent aquatic habitat of primarily cobbles. Here, water mixes with the air at the water surface, increasing dissolved oxygen levels within the stream. Benthic macroinvertebrates thrive in riffles, living on the surfaces and interstitial spaces between rocks. Many species also depend on low energy backwater areas for feeding and important life cycle stages.

== Human impacts ==
=== Land use impacts ===
==== Logging ====
Logging of timberland in alluvial watersheds has been shown to increase sediment yields to rivers, causing aggradation of the streambed, increasing turbidity, and altering sediment size and sediment distribution along the channel. The increase in sediment yield is attributed to increased runoff and erosion and slope failure, a result of removing vegetation from the landscape as well as building roads.

==== Agriculture ====
Agricultural land uses divert water from alluvial rivers for crop production, as well constrain the river's ability to meander or migrate due levee construction or other forms of armoring. The result is simplified channel morphology with lower baseflows.

=== Dams and diversions ===
Dams and diversions alter the natural hydrologic regime of rivers, both upstream and downstream, with widespread effects that alter the watershed ecosystem. Since alluvial river morphology and fluvial ecosystem processes are largely shaped by the complex interplay of hydrograph components such as the magnitude, frequency, duration, timing, and rate of change of flow, any change in one of these components can be associated with a tangible alteration of the ecosystem. Dams are often associated with reduced wet season flood magnitudes and altered (oftentimes reduced) dry season baseflow. This can negatively affect aquatic organisms that are specifically evolved to natural flow conditions. By altering the natural hydrograph components, particularly reducing flow magnitudes, dams and other diversions reduce the river's ability to mobilize sediment, resulting in sediment-choked channels. Conversely, dams are a physical barrier to the naturally continuous movement of sediment from headwaters to the river mouth, and can create sediment deficient conditions and incision directly downstream.

Understanding the natural attributes of alluvial rivers is necessary when restoring their function on small-scale levels below dams. Though the function of the rivers may never be fully restored, it is possible to recreate and preserve their integrity with proper planning and consideration of their necessary attributes. Restoration efforts should focus on restoring the connectivity between the main channel and other floodplain bodies that were lost due to dam creation and flow regulation. The preservation and reconstruction of these alluvial river habitats is necessary in maintaining and sustaining the ecological integrity of river-floodplain ecosystems.
