= Humaniya =

Humānīya Humayniyah
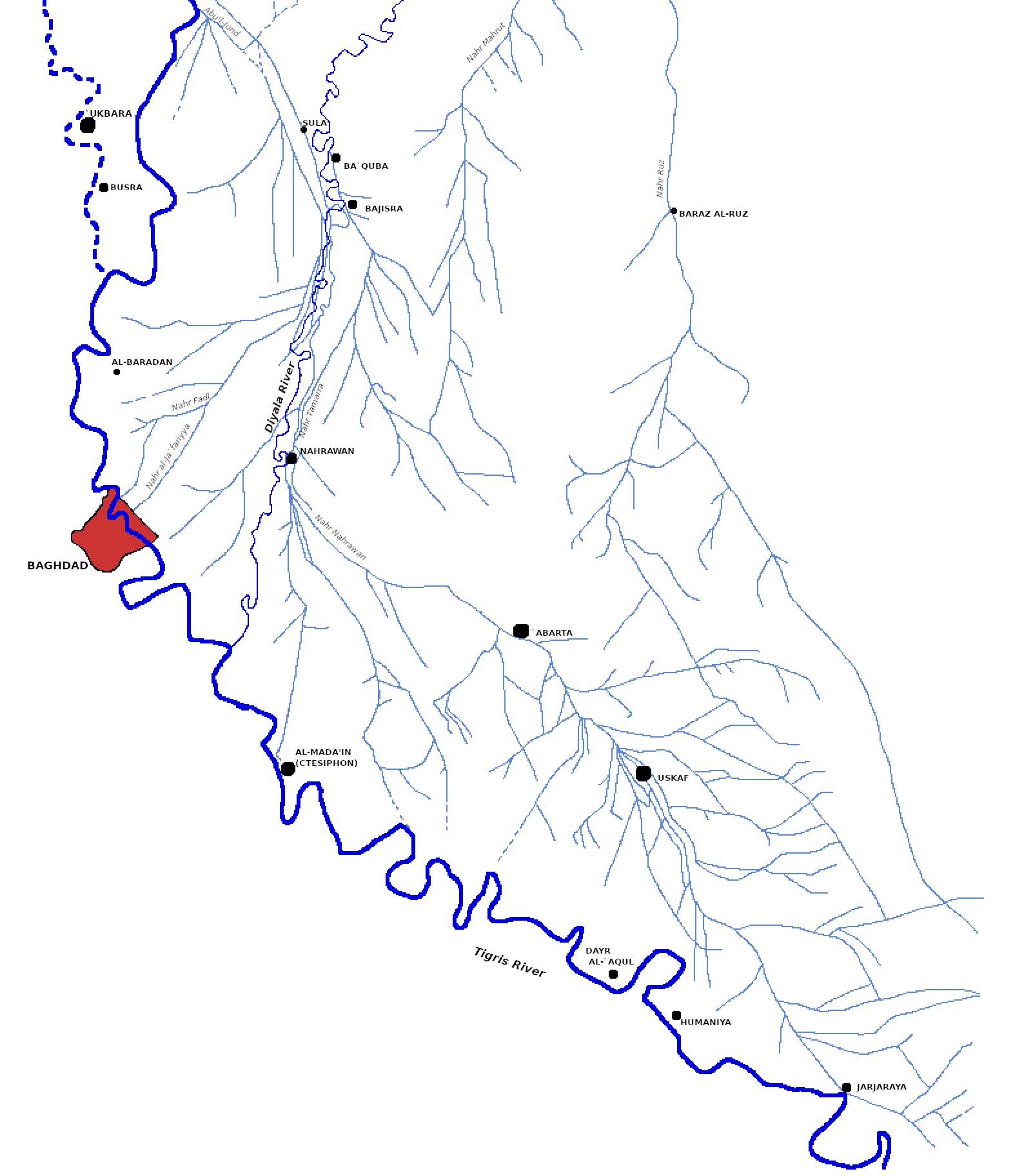
- Map showing Humaniya in relation to other medieval Iraqi sites

- Humaniya's location in Iraq
- Coordinates: near 32°50′38″N 45°04′36″E
- Country: Iraq
- Governorate: Wasit

al-Humānīya, also called al-Humayniyah, is a historical town in Iraq, on the Tigris. Of probable Sasanian origin, Humaniya was a large regional town of medieval Iraq, mentioned by several contemporary authors.

After the caliph al-Amin, died, his mother, Zubaydah, and his two sons were imprisoned in Humaniya on the orders of al-Ma'mun. In the early 1200s, Yaqut al-Hamawi described it as a village the size of a city, surrounded by extensive farmland. This suggests that Humaniya may have expanded during the late Abbasid period, even while most towns in the area were shrinking or becoming abandoned altogether.

Archaeological evidence indicates that Humaniya was one of a relatively small number of permanent settlements in the region to remain occupied during the Ilkhanid period, when settled agriculture was dramatically reduced throughout Iraq. One or more minarets were still standing here when Felix Jones surveyed the area of the Nahrawan Canal in the mid-1800s, and Guy Le Strange noted that Humaniya was "still found on the map" around the turn of the 20th century.

Historically, Humaniya was on the right, or south, bank of the Tigris, but the oxbow loop it lay on became cut off in the late 19th century, and it is now on the left/north bank.
