= Helicoidal flow =

Cork-screw-like flow of water in a meander

Helicoidal flow is the cork-screw-like flow of water in a meander. It is one example of a secondary flow.

Helicoidal flow is a contributing factor to the formation of slip-off slopes and river cliffs in a meandering section of the river. The helicoidal motion of the flow aids the processes of hydraulic action and corrasion on the outside of the meander, and sweeps sediment across the floor of the meander towards the inside of the meander, forming point bar deposits.

== See also ==
- Laminar flow
- Turbulent flow
- Baer's law
- Secondary flow in river bends

== Bibliography ==
- Journal of Geophysical Research, Volume 107 (2002)
