= Meander cutoff =

Disconnection of a river segment

Animation of the formation of an oxbow lake

A meander cutoff forming into a lake

A meander cutoff is a natural form of a cutting or cut in a river which occurs when a pronounced meander (hook) in a river is breached by a flow that connects the two closest parts of the hook to form a new channel, a full loop. The steeper drop in gradient (slope) causes the river flow gradually to abandon the meander which will silt up with sediment from deposition. Cutoffs are a natural part of the evolution of a meandering river. Rivers form meanders as they flow laterally downstream (see sinuosity).

== Description ==
Meandering rivers flow higher and hence with more total flow, pressure and erosion on the outside of their bends due to forming a vortex as in a stirred coffee cup and consequently the river erodes more the outer bank. On the inside bend of a river, the level is lower, secondary flow moves sand and gravel across the river bed creating shallows and point bars, and friction of air and perturbances of the bed act against a higher proportion of the column of water, being shorter, slowing the water to varying degrees. Rivers are commonly described and interpreted by their sinuosity. The term is equally used to describe the actual incidence of and potential tendency of a river to curve or meander over its length.

It is expressed as the ratio of the distance between two distant points in a river following the middle-of-the-river course of the river as compared with the straight distance between those points. Three conventional categorizations of rivers or their reaches exist. Meandering rivers have a sinuosity value/ratio of greater than 1.5. A sinuosity value of less than 1.1 is a “straight” river. Between these values, a river is described as sinuous which describes those in a transitory state between the two states. Braided rivers do not follow this same convention. Meandering rivers trend in the direction of increasing sinuosity.

== Cutoff channel ==
A river constantly evolves and as it does, meanders that were once a part of the river are abandoned in favor of a route that is more efficient for a river to take. As these old meanders are cutoff from the rest of the river, a new channel, or cutoff channel, is formed.

- Neck cutoff: a river bend intersects itself. On the outer bends of a river, where water is flowing fastest, the river will erode away the land between adjacent outer bends and cause them to become close to each other; this leads to their intersection.
- Chute cutoff: a channel cuts directly across the land bypassing an entire meandering loop in the river and abandoning it.

== Formation ==
A chute cutoff channel can form during a flood resulting in an overbank flow where water goes over the banks of the river, creating erosion of the surrounding landscape. More studies need to be done on how the magnitude of these floods and their recurrence interval are related to how often these chute cutoff channels form. Neck cutoff channels are commonly formed the same way when an overbank flow occurs during a flood and the narrow piece of land between a bend in a meander is eroded away; this is known as rush-cutting. A meander can also be cutoff by a channel due to excess sediment upstream as a result of high erosion rates. This leads to a cutoff channel forming since a river might no longer be able to carry that sediment through the bend efficiently, so the river forms a new path for it to flow. Meander cutoffs can also be formed by humans; by removing a beaver dam, the likelihood that meander cutoff channels will be formed downstream increases. A cutoff channel can be engineered for the purpose of navigation, traditionally for water mill leats and for controlling the possibility of any future flood were done on the lower reaches away from the tide. These meander cutoffs straighten a river. Many rivers are transformed by humans, becoming less sinuous.

== Oxbow lake ==
When either of these meander cutoff processes takes place a bend of the river is left behind forming, in many instances, an oxbow lake. An oxbow lake forms after there has been deposition of sediment, by the new cutoff channel flowing adjacent to it, at the entrances of the abandoned bend; this seals the bend off from the rest of the river. Oxbow lakes have been shown to be an important habitat for various species of wildlife. Recent efforts have been made to protect these important bodies of water from harmful practices such as agricultural use. One proposed method to restore these oxbow lakes has been dredging. Dredging will remove sediment from the lake’s floor and will increase the lake’s depth. Collins Lake in Scotia, New York is an example of this method. Oxbow lakes can be valuable for recreational purposes and in Salix, Iowa, Browns Lake’s water level was increased for recreational use.

== Example ==
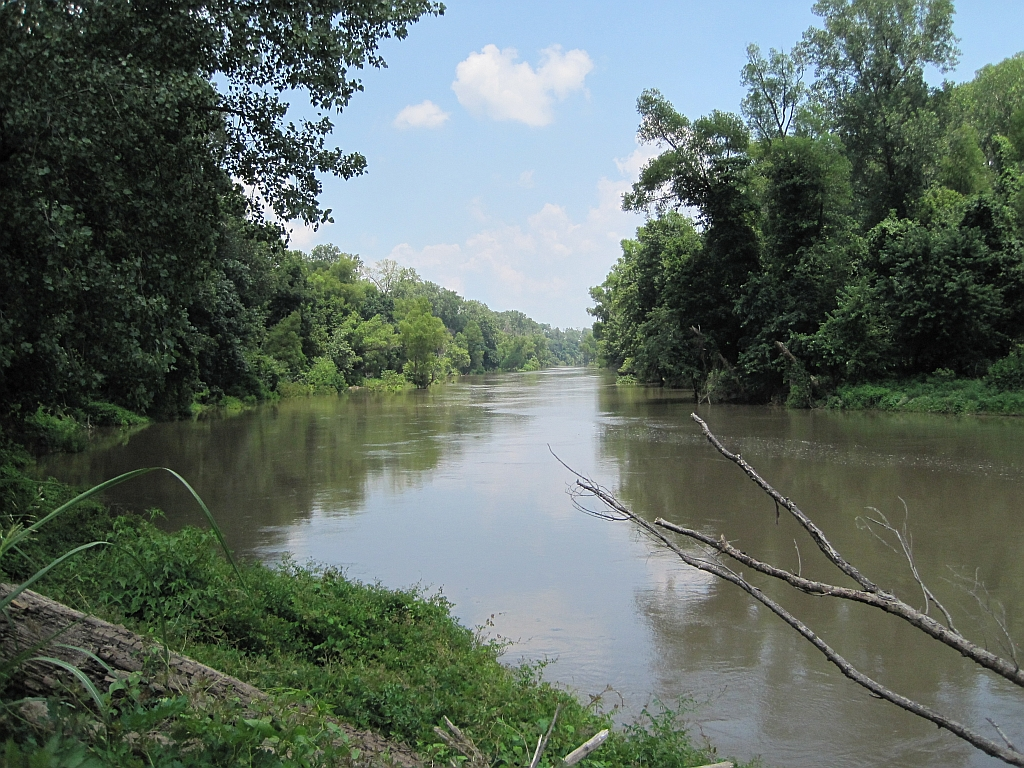
View along the former Mississippi River riverbed at the Tennessee/Arkansas state line near Reverie, Tennessee (2007)

On 7 March 1876 a cutoff formed suddenly across the neck of a meander, known as the "Devil's Elbow", in the Mississippi River near Reverie, Tennessee, shortening the river's course and leaving the town connected to Arkansas, but across the new river channel from the rest of Tennessee.

== Importance ==
Some research has been done to show importance. Cutoffs have been shown to limit the age of a river meander and thus how large that meander can get, without which in areas of extreme sinuosity and low gradients means very long, slightly slowed, sections of rivers intensifying local flood risk. Meander cutoffs influence the formation of a river’s floodplain and continue to do so as the river evolves. Cutoffs can affect the way that other river bends adjacent evolve over time, increasing their height of flooding and the direct momentum of the water which can then create further cutoffs and affect other bends further downstream throughout the river. Meander cutoffs directly reduce and tend to indirectly reduce a river’s sinuosity, thus straightening out a river’s channel. Understanding the processes that form meander cutoffs can allow one to predict how a river will evolve in the future which is important for agricultural businesses and controlling future floods.
