= Secondary flow =

Relatively minor flow superimposed on the primary flow by inviscid assumptions

In fluid dynamics, flow can be decomposed into primary flow plus secondary flow, a relatively weaker flow pattern superimposed on the stronger primary flow pattern. The primary flow is often chosen to be an exact solution to simplified or approximated governing equations, such as potential flow around a wing or geostrophic current or wind on the rotating Earth. In that case, the secondary flow usefully spotlights the effects of complicated real-world terms neglected in those approximated equations. For instance, the consequences of viscosity are spotlighted by secondary flow in the viscous boundary layer, resolving the tea leaf paradox. As another example, if the primary flow is taken to be a balanced flow approximation with net force equated to zero, then the secondary circulation helps spotlight acceleration due to the mild imbalance of forces. A smallness assumption about secondary flow also facilitates linearization.

In engineering, secondary flow also identifies an additional flow path.

== Examples of secondary flows ==
=== Wind near ground level ===
The basic principles of physics and the Coriolis effect define an approximate geostrophic wind or gradient wind, balanced flows that are parallel to the isobars. Measurements of wind speed and direction at heights well above ground level confirm that wind matches these approximations quite well. However, nearer the Earth's surface, the wind speed is less than predicted by the barometric pressure gradient, and the wind direction is partly across the isobars rather than parallel to them. This flow of air across the isobars is a secondary flow., a difference from the primary flow which is parallel to the isobars. Interference by surface roughness elements such as terrain, waves, trees and buildings cause drag on the wind and prevent the air from accelerating to the speed necessary to achieve balanced flow. As a result, the wind direction near ground level is partly parallel to the isobars in the region, and partly across the isobars in the direction from higher pressure to lower pressure.

As a result of the slower wind speed at the earth's surface, in a region of low pressure the barometric pressure is usually significantly higher at the surface than would be expected, given the barometric pressure at mid altitudes, due to Bernoulli's principle. Hence, the secondary flow toward the center of a region of low pressure is also drawn upward by the significantly lower pressure at mid altitudes. This slow, widespread ascent of the air in a region of low pressure can cause widespread cloud and rain if the air is of sufficiently high relative humidity.

In a region of high pressure (an anticyclone) the secondary flow includes a slow, widespread descent of air from mid altitudes toward ground level, and then outward across the isobars. This descent causes a reduction in relative humidity and explains why regions of high pressure usually experience cloud-free skies for many days.

==== Tropical cyclones ====
The flow around a tropical cyclone is often well approximated as parallel to circular isobars, such as in a vortex. A strong pressure gradient draws air toward the center of the cyclone, a centripetal force nearly balanced by Coriolis and centrifugal forces in gradient wind balance. The viscous secondary flow near the Earth's surface converges toward the center of the cyclone, ascending in the eyewall to satisfy mass continuity. As the secondary flow is drawn upward the air cools as its pressure falls, causing extremely heavy rainfall and releasing latent heat which is an important driver of the storm's energy budget.

=== Tornadoes and dust devils ===
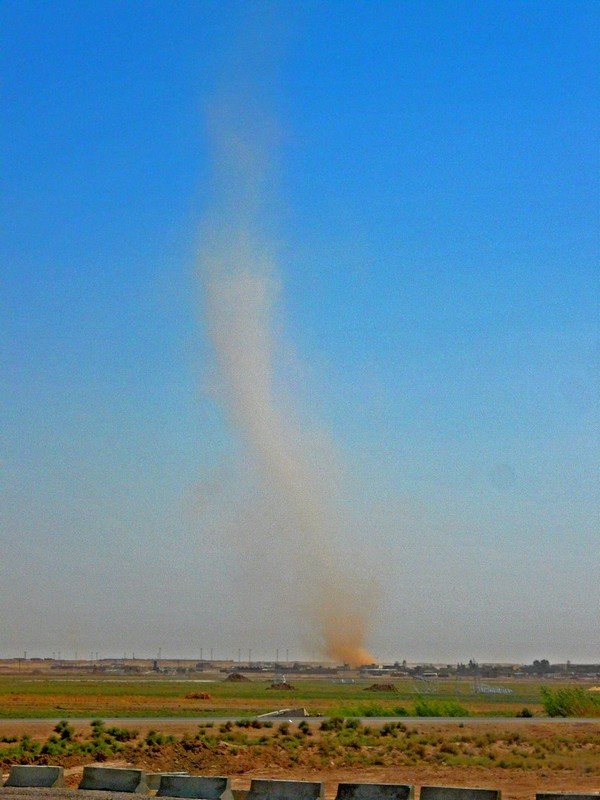
An example of a dust devil in Ramadi, Iraq

Tornadoes and dust devils display localised vortex flow. Their fluid motion is similar to tropical cyclones but on a much smaller scale so that the Coriolis effect is not significant. The primary flow is circular around the vertical axis of the tornado or dust devil. As with all vortex flow, the speed of the flow is fastest at the core of the vortex. In accordance with Bernoulli's principle where the wind speed is fastest the air pressure is lowest; and where the wind speed is slowest the air pressure is highest. Consequently, near the center of the tornado or dust devil the air pressure is low. There is a pressure gradient toward the center of the vortex. This gradient, coupled with the slower speed of the air near the earth's surface, causes a secondary flow toward the center of the tornado or dust devil, rather than in a purely circular pattern.

The slower speed of the air at the surface prevents the air pressure from falling as low as would normally be expected from the air pressure at greater heights. This is compatible with Bernoulli's principle. The secondary flow is toward the center of the tornado or dust devil, and is then drawn upward by the significantly lower pressure several thousands of feet above the surface in the case of a tornado, or several hundred feet in the case of a dust devil. Tornadoes can be very destructive and the secondary flow can cause debris to be swept into a central location and carried to low altitudes.

Dust devils can be seen by the dust stirred up at ground level, swept up by the secondary flow and concentrated in a central location. The accumulation of dust then accompanies the secondary flow upward into the region of intense low pressure that exists outside the influence of the ground.

=== Circular flow in a bowl or cup ===
When water in a circular bowl or cup is moving in circular motion the water displays free-vortex flow – the water at the center of the bowl or cup spins at relatively high speed, and the water at the perimeter spins more slowly. The water is a little deeper at the perimeter and a little more shallow at the center, and the surface of the water is not flat but displays the characteristic depression toward the axis of the spinning fluid. At any elevation within the water the pressure is a little greater near the perimeter of the bowl or cup where the water is a little deeper, than near the center. The water pressure is a little greater where the water speed is a little slower, and the pressure is a little less where the speed is faster, and this is consistent with Bernoulli's principle.

There is a pressure gradient from the perimeter of the bowl or cup toward the center. This pressure gradient provides the centripetal force necessary for the circular motion of each parcel of water. The pressure gradient also accounts for a secondary flow of the boundary layer in the water flowing across the floor of the bowl or cup. The slower speed of the water in the boundary layer is unable to balance the pressure gradient. The boundary layer spirals inward toward the axis of circulation of the water. On reaching the center the secondary flow is then upward toward the surface, progressively mixing with the primary flow. Near the surface there may also be a slow secondary flow outward toward the perimeter.

The secondary flow along the floor of the bowl or cup can be seen by sprinkling heavy particles such as sugar, sand, rice or tea leaves into the water and then setting the water in circular motion by stirring with a hand or spoon. The boundary layer spirals inward and sweeps the heavier solids into a neat pile in the center of the bowl or cup. With water circulating in a bowl or cup, the primary flow is purely circular and might be expected to fling heavy particles outward to the perimeter. Instead, heavy particles can be seen to congregate in the center as a result of the secondary flow along the floor.

=== River bends ===
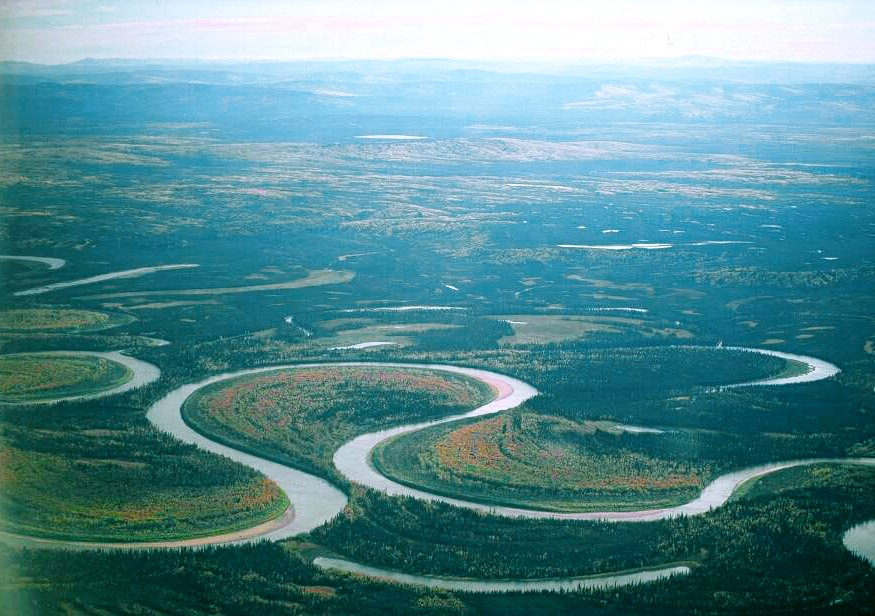

Water flowing through a bend in a river must follow curved streamlines to remain within the banks of the river. The water surface is slightly higher near the concave bank than near the convex bank. (The "concave bank" has the greater radius. The "convex bank" has the smaller radius.) As a result, at any elevation within the river, water pressure is slightly higher near the concave bank than near the convex bank. A pressure gradient results from the concave bank toward the other bank. Centripetal forces are necessary for the curved path of each parcel of water, which is provided by the pressure gradient.

The primary flow around the bend approximates a free vortex – fastest speed where the radius of curvature of the stream itself is smallest and slowest speed where the radius is largest. The higher pressure near the concave (outer) bank is accompanied by slower water speed, and the lower pressure near the convex bank is accompanied by faster water speed, and all this is consistent with Bernoulli's principle.

A secondary flow is produced in the boundary layer along the floor of the river bed. The boundary layer is not moving fast enough to balance the pressure gradient and so its path is partly downstream and partly across the stream from the concave bank toward the convex bank, driven by the pressure gradient. The secondary flow is then upward toward the surface where it mixes with the primary flow or moves slowly across the surface, back toward the concave bank. This motion is called helicoidal flow.

On the floor of the river bed the secondary flow sweeps sand, silt and gravel across the river and deposits the solids near the convex bank, in similar fashion to sugar or tea leaves being swept toward the center of a bowl or cup as described above. This process can lead to accentuation or creation of D-shaped islands, meanders through creation of cut banks and opposing point bars which in turn may result in an oxbow lake. The convex (inner) bank of river bends tends to be shallow and made up of sand, silt and fine gravel; the concave (outer) bank tends to be steep and elevated due to heavy erosion.

=== Turbomachinery ===
Different definitions have been put forward for secondary flow in turbomachinery, such as "Secondary flow in broad terms means flow at right angles to intended primary flow".

Secondary flows occur in the main, or primary, flowpath in turbomachinery compressors and turbines (see also unrelated use of term for flow in the secondary air system of a gas turbine engine). They are always present when a wall boundary layer is turned through an angle by a curved surface. They are a source of total pressure loss and limit the efficiency that can be achieved for the compressor or turbine. Modelling the flow enables blade, vane and end-wall surfaces to be shaped to reduce the losses.

Secondary flows occur throughout the impeller in a centrifugal compressor but are less marked in axial compressors due to shorter passage lengths. Flow turning is low in axial compressors but boundary layers are thick on the annulus walls which gives significant secondary flows. Flow turning in turbine blading and vanes is high and generates strong secondary flow.

Secondary flows also occur in pumps for liquids and include inlet prerotation, or intake vorticity, tip clearance flow (tip leakage), flow separation when operating away from the design condition, and secondary vorticity.

The following, from Dixon, shows the secondary flow generated by flow turning in an axial compressor blade or stator passage. Consider flow with an approach velocity c1. The velocity profile will be non-uniform due to friction between the annulus wall and the fluid. The vorticity of this boundary layer is normal to the approach velocity $c_{1}$ and of magnitude
$$w_1=\frac{dc_1}{dz},$$
where z is the distance to the wall.

As the vorticity of each blade onto each other will be of opposite directions, a secondary vorticity will be generated. If the deflection angle, e, between the guide vanes is small, the magnitude of the secondary vorticity is represented as
$$w_s = -2e \left(\frac{dc_1}{dz}\right)$$

This secondary flow will be the integrated effect of the distribution of secondary vorticity along the blade length.

=== Gas turbine engines ===
Gas turbine engines have a power-producing primary airflow passing through the compressor. They also have a substantial (25% of core flow in a Pratt & Whitney PW2000) secondary flow obtained from the primary flow and which is pumped from the compressor and used by the secondary air system. Like the secondary flow in turbomachinery this secondary flow is also a loss to the power-producing capability of the engine.

=== Air-breathing propulsion systems ===
Thrust-producing flow which passes through an engines thermal cycle is called primary airflow. Using only cycle flow was relatively short-lived as the turbojet engine. Airflow through a propeller or a turbomachine fan is called secondary flow and is not part of the thermal cycle. This use of secondary flow reduces losses and increases the overall efficiency of the propulsion system. The secondary flow may be many times that through the engine.

=== Supersonic air-breathing propulsion systems ===
During the 1960s cruising at speeds between Mach 2 to 3 was pursued for commercial and military aircraft. Concorde, North American XB-70 and Lockheed SR-71 used ejector-type supersonic nozzles which had a secondary flow obtained from the inlet upstream of the engine compressor. The secondary flow was used to purge the engine compartment, cool the engine case, cool the ejector nozzle and cushion the primary expansion. The secondary flow was ejected by the pumping action of the primary gas flow through the engine nozzle and the ram pressure in the inlet.

== See also ==
- Ekman layer – Net transport of surface water perpendicular to wind direction
- Langmuir circulation – Vortices at the ocean's surface
- Secondary circulation – Circulation induced in a rotating system
