= Bank erosion =

Marginal wear of a watercourse

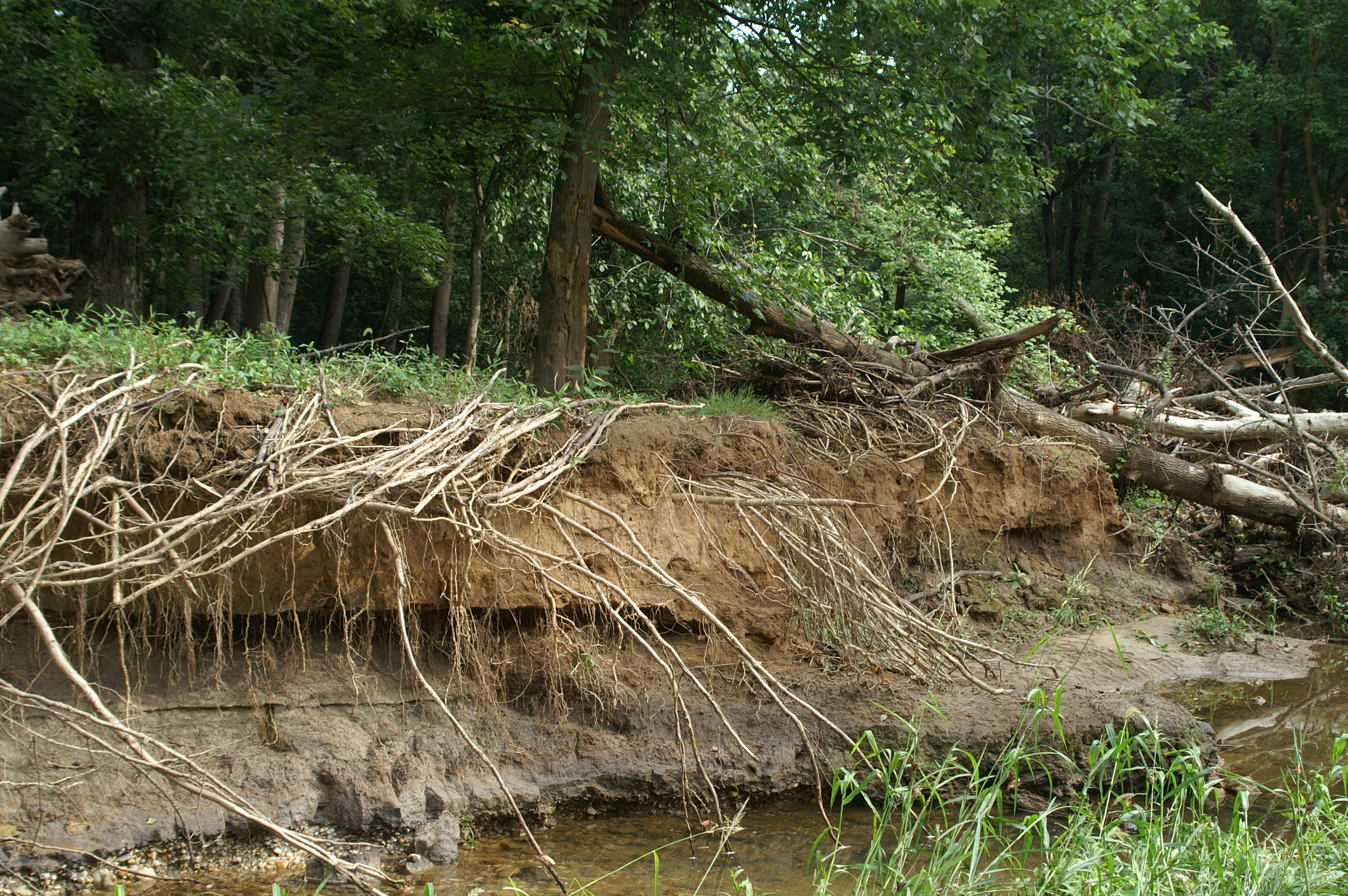
Stream bank erosion along Pimmit Run in McLean, Virginia, the result of upstream development. Bank erosion is natural, but can be accelerated by humans.

Bank erosion is the wearing away of the banks of a stream or river. This is distinguished from erosion of the bed of the watercourse, which is referred to as scour.

The roots of trees growing by a stream are undercut by such erosion. As the roots bind the soil tightly, they form abutments which jut out over the water. These have a significant effect upon the rate and progress of the erosion.

== Measurement ==
There are a variety of methods for measuring river bank erosion rates. A direct method is to insert metal rods (called "erosion pins") into the bank and marking the position of the bank surface along the rods at different times. This simple measurement technique can be enhanced with the use of a data logger attached to a rod of photoreceptors; the logger records the voltage, which is an indication of how much of the rod is exposed. Another common method is to survey a stream cross section repeatedly over time. This measures the erosion rate in addition to changes in the geometry of stream banks. Aerial and satellite imagery can be used to measure rates of bank erosion and river channel migration at larger spatial scales by comparing bank locations at various times. Finally, there are a variety of less common methods like using sedimentology or tree age to calculate erosion rates by approximating historic locations of the river channel.

== Mechanisms ==
There are two primary mechanisms of stream bank erosion: fluvial erosion and mass failure. Fluvial erosion is the direct removal of soil particles by flowing water. The rate of fluvial erosion is determined both by the force of the flowing water (e.g. faster flow equals more force) and the resistance of the bank material to erosion (e.g. clay is generally more resistant to erosion than sand). Mass failure occurs when the weight of a stream bank is greater than the strength of the soil, causing the bank to collapse. This process is dependent upon a number of factors including the internal strength of the soil (e.g. clay vs. sand), soil-water content, and vegetation. These two erosion processes are linked as fluvial erosion of the bottom of the bank creates a steeper bank angle or overhanging soil blocks which are more unstable and likely to collapse.

Other erosion processes include cycles of wetting and drying or freezing and thawing which weakens the bank soil and makes it more susceptible to erosion. An additional form of erosion is termed seepage erosion. This occurs when groundwater flows out of a stream bank with enough force to erode the bank material. If concentrated, seepage erosion can be called piping because a “pipe” of soil is eroded.

== Vegetation ==
Vegetation can have a significant impact on bank erosion. Generally, banks with vegetation erode more slowly than those without. Dense vegetation growing on the bank face can deflect flowing water and prevent fluvial erosion. Roots generally increase the strength of bank material, making a bank less prone to mass failure. However, trees can also add significant weight to the tops of stream banks and may actually decrease stability.

== Control ==
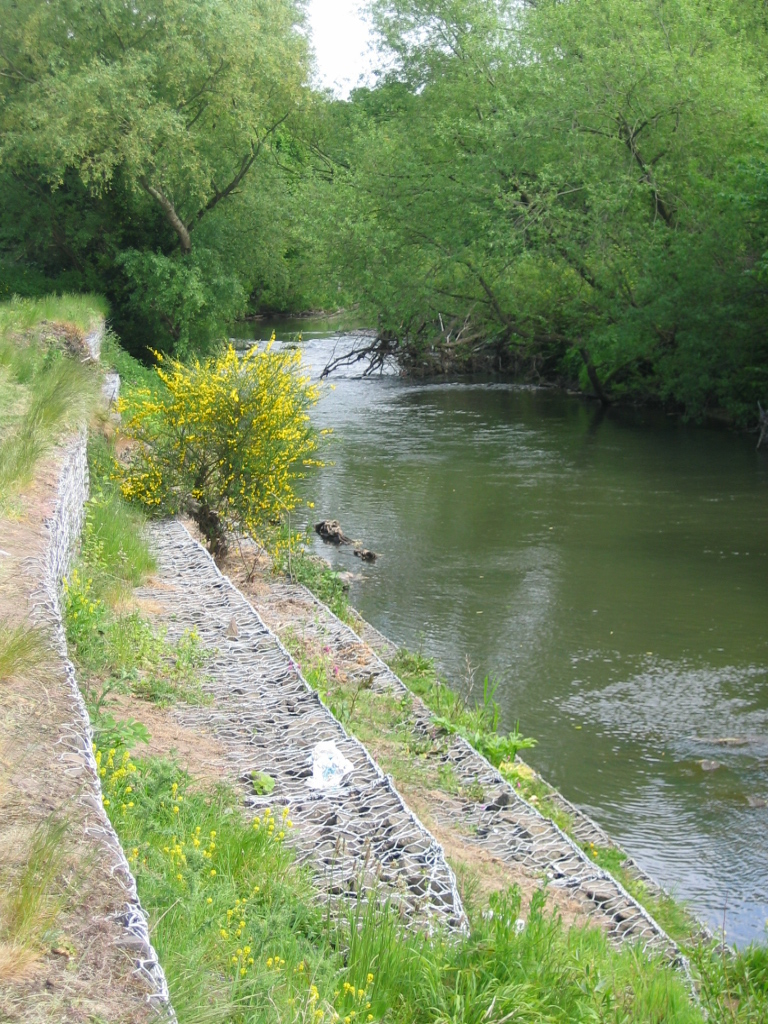
Gabions used to stabilize the bank of the River Esk, Lothian, Scotland

Bank erosion is a natural process: without it, rivers would not meander and change course. However, land management patterns that change the hydrograph and/or vegetation cover can act to increase or decrease channel migration rates. In many places, whether or not the banks are unstable due to human activities, people try to keep a river in a single place. This can be done for environmental reclamation or to prevent a river from changing course into land that is being used by people. One way that this is done is by placing riprap or gabions along the bank. Another method is using stream restoration structures, such as log vanes, cross vanes, or toe wood. A common natural method to reduce bank erosion is the re-introduction of native plant species in the area. The expansive root systems of these plants provide support within the soil and prevents erosion due to rain runoff.

== See also ==
- Erosion
- Cut bank
- Point bar
