= Cut bank =

Outside bank of a water channel, which is continually undergoing erosion

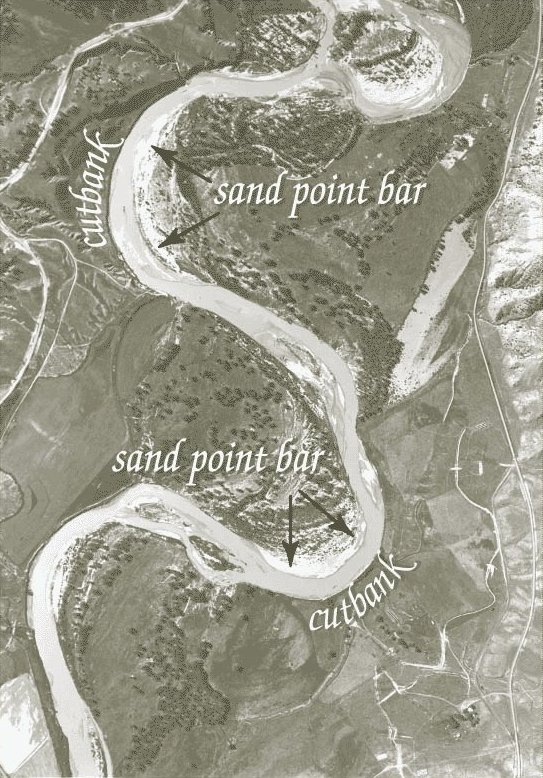
Cut bank erosion and point bar deposition as seen on the Powder River in Montana.

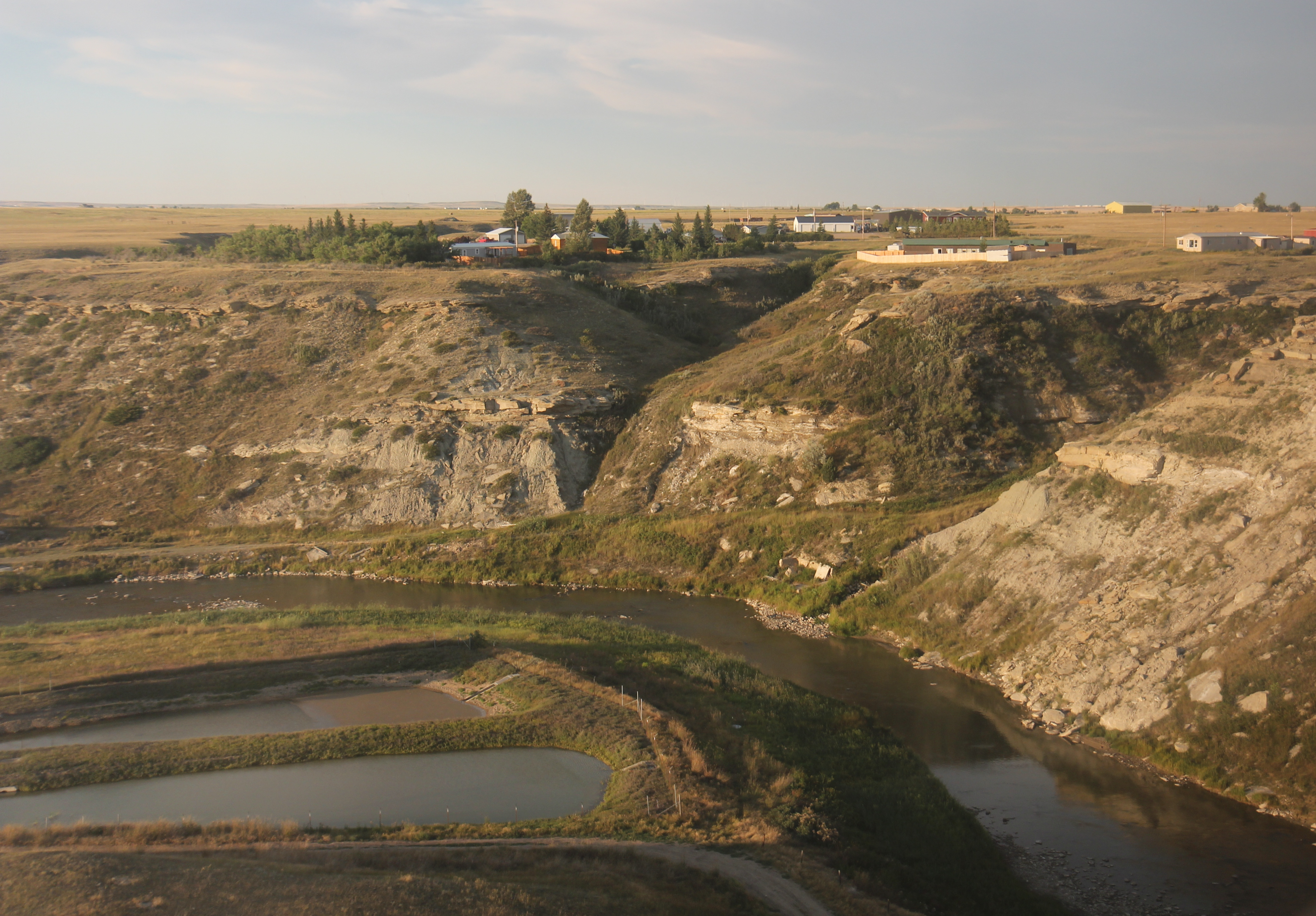
Cut banks along the Cut Bank Creek

A cut bank, also known as a river cliff or river-cut cliff, is the outside bank of a curve (meander) in a water channel (stream), which is continually undergoing erosion. Cut banks occur on the outer side of meander bends, opposite the point bar or slip-off slope on the inner side. They are shaped much like a small cliff, and are formed as the stream collides with the river bank. It is the opposite of a point bar, which is an area of deposition of material eroded upstream in a cut bank.

Typically, cut banks are steep and may be nearly vertical. Erosion can undercut a cut bank and cause masses of bank material, trees, and vegetation to collapse or slide into the river; flooding and bank erosion can also damage nearby property and structures. Given enough time, the combination of erosion along cut banks and deposition along point bars can lead to the formation of an oxbow lake.

Not only are cut banks steep and unstable, they are also the area of a stream where the water is flowing the fastest and often deeper. The greater velocity and energy of flow along the outer bend produces erosion of the cut bank.

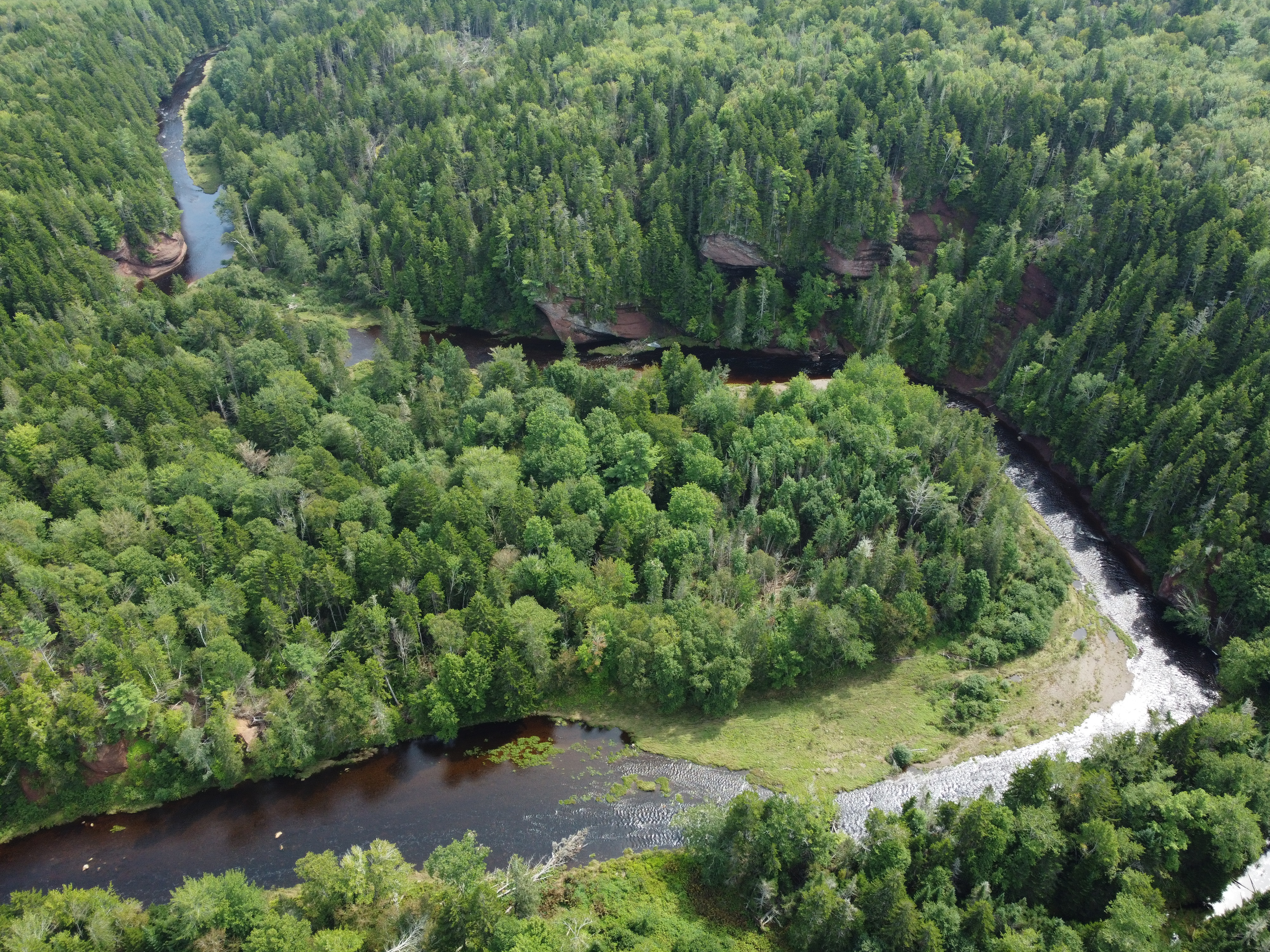
A large meander on the Economy River. The cut bank is the near-vertical cliff on the outside of the meander.

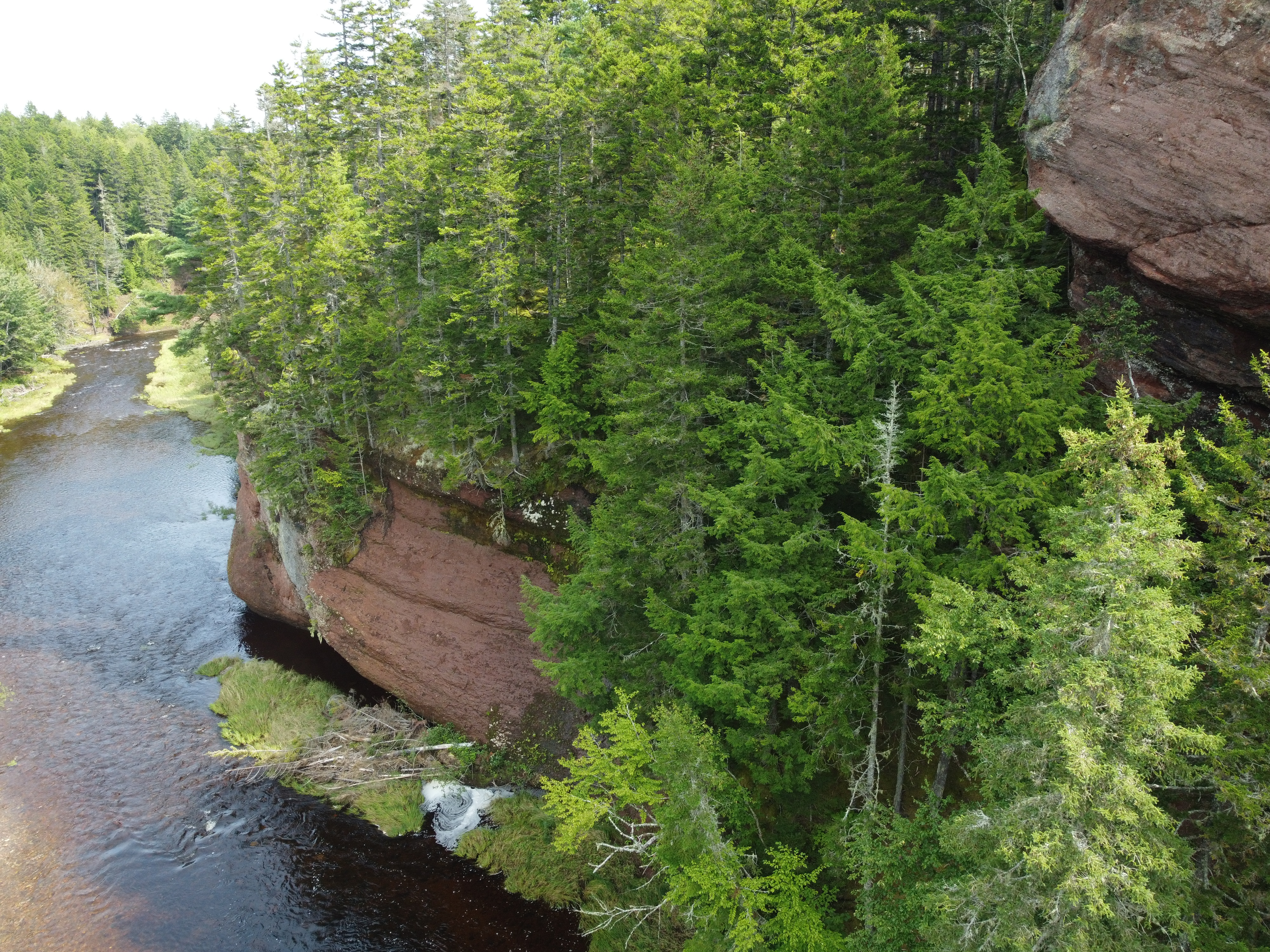
Close-up view of a cut-bank on the Economy River, showing its steepness

== See also ==
- Bank erosion – Marginal wear of a watercourse
- Point bar – Landform related to streams and rivers
- Slip-off slope – Depositional landform on the inside convex bank of a meandering river
