= Meander =

One of a series of curves in a channel of a matured stream

A stream bed following a tilted valley. The maximum gradient is along the down-valley axis represented by a hypothetical straight coast channel. Meanders develop, which lengthen the course of the stream, decreasing the gradient.

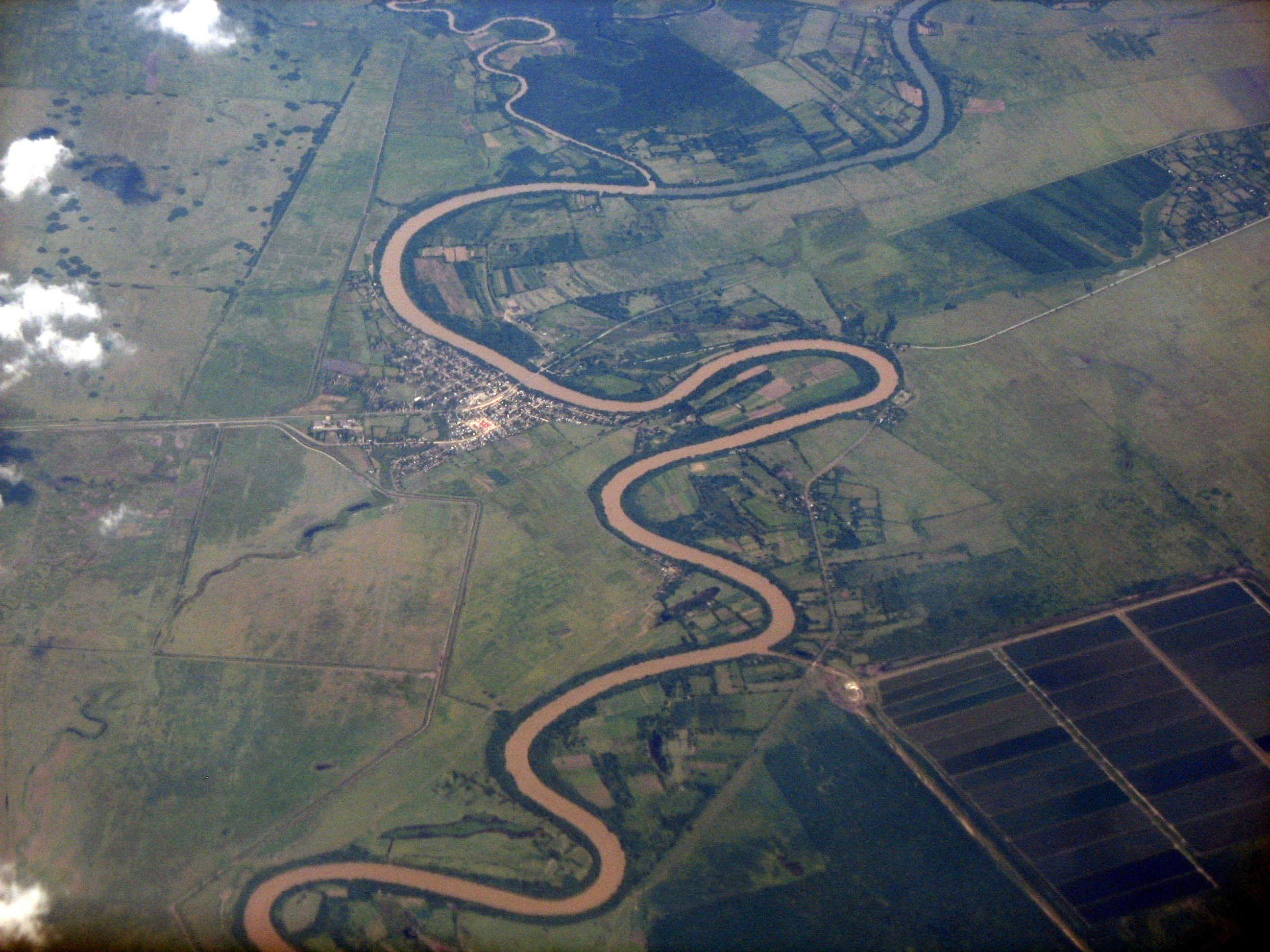
Meanders of the Rio Cauto at Guamo Embarcadero, Cuba

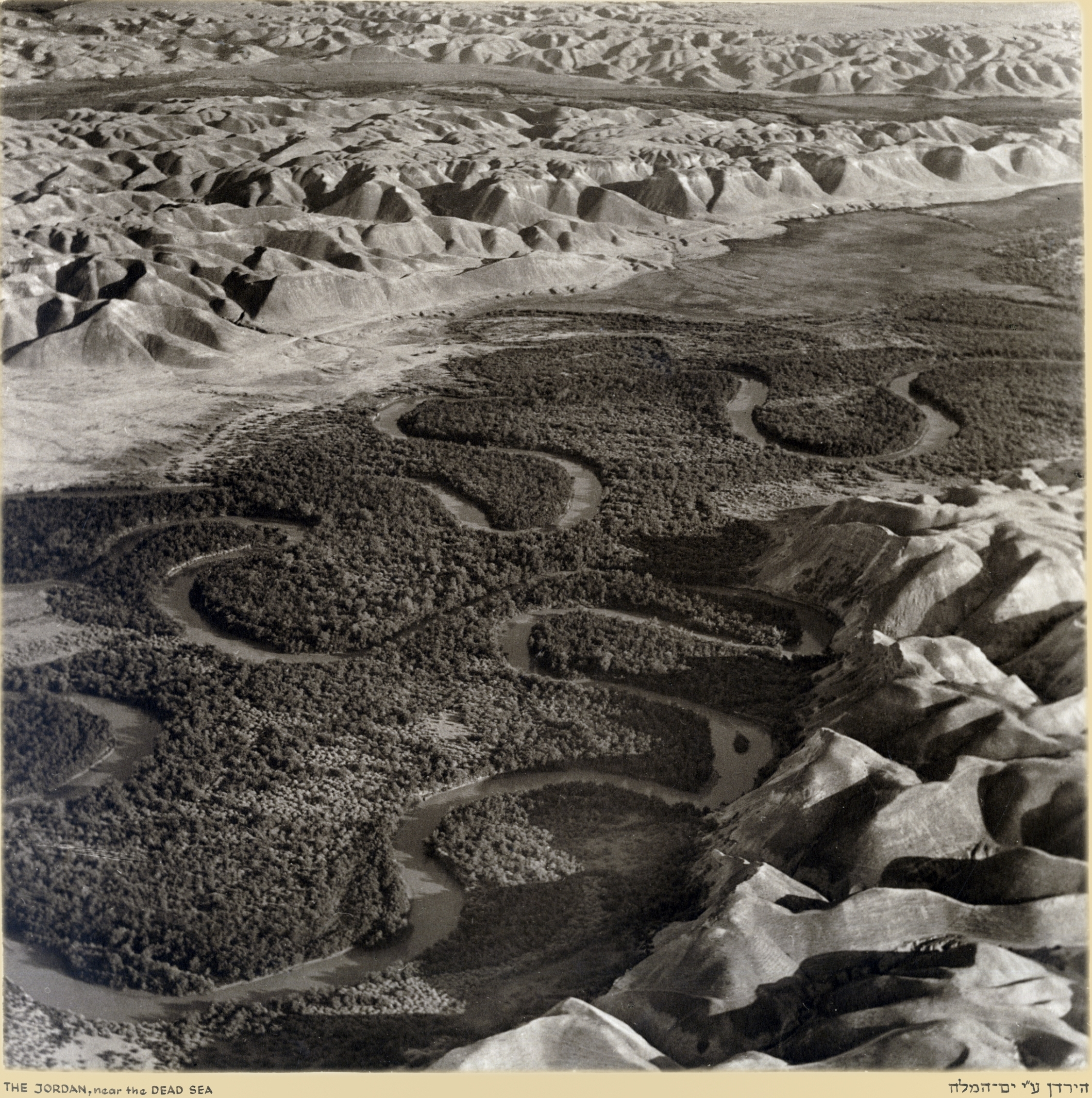
The Jordan River, near the Dead Sea, 1937

A meander is one of a series of regular sinuous curves in the channel of a stream. It is produced as a watercourse erodes the sediments of an outer, concave bank (cut bank or river cliff) and deposits sediments on an inner, convex bank which is typically a point bar. The result of this coupled erosion and sedimentation is the formation of a sinuous course as the channel migrates back and forth across the axis of a floodplain.

The zone within which a meandering stream periodically shifts its channel is known as a meander belt. It typically ranges from 15 to 18 times the width of the channel. Over time, meanders migrate downstream, sometimes in such a short time as to create civil engineering challenges for local municipalities attempting to maintain stable roads and bridges.

The degree of meandering of the channel of a river, stream, or other watercourse is measured by its sinuosity. The sinuosity of a watercourse is the ratio of the length of the channel to the straight line down-valley distance. Streams or rivers with a single channel and sinuosities of 1.5 or more are defined as meandering streams or rivers.

== Origin of term ==
The term derives from the winding river Menderes located in Asia Minor and known to the Ancient Greeks as Μαίανδρος Maiandros (Latin: Maeander), characterised by a very convoluted path along the lower reach. As a result, even in Classical Greece (and in later Greek thought) the name of the river had become a common noun meaning anything convoluted and winding, such as decorative patterns or speech and ideas, as well as the geomorphological feature. Strabo said: ‘...its course is so exceedingly winding that everything winding is called meandering.’ The river is south of Izmir, east of the ancient Greek city of Miletus. It flows through series of three graben in the Menderes Massif but has a flood plain much wider than the meander zone in its lower reach.

== Governing physics ==
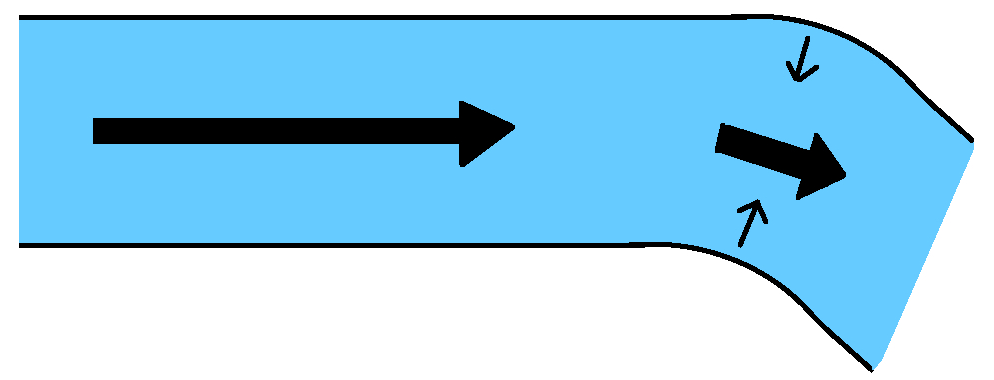
Straight channel culminating in a single bend

Meanders are a result of the interaction of water flowing through a curved channel with the underlying stream bed. This produces helicoidal flow, in which water moves from the outer to the inner bank along the bed, then flows back to the outer bank near the surface of the stream. This in turn increases carrying capacity for sediments on the outer bank and reduces it on the inner bank, so that sediments are eroded from the outer bank and deposited on the inner bank of the next downstream meander.

When a fluid is introduced to an initially straight channel which then bends, the sidewalls induce a pressure gradient that causes the fluid to alter course and follow the bend. From here, two opposing processes occur: (1) irrotational flow and (2) secondary flow. For a stream to meander, secondary flow must dominate.

Irrotational flow: From Bernoulli's equations, high pressure results in low velocity. Therefore, in the absence of secondary flow there is low fluid velocity at the outside bend and high fluid velocity at the inside bend. This classic fluid mechanics result is irrotational vortex flow. In the context of meandering streams, its effects are dominated by those of secondary flow.

Secondary flow: A force balance exists between pressure forces pointing to the inside bend of the river and centrifugal forces pointing to the outside bend of the stream. In the context of meandering streams, a boundary layer exists within the thin layer of fluid that interacts with the stream bed. Inside that layer and following standard boundary-layer theory, the velocity of the fluid is effectively zero. Centrifugal force, which depends on velocity, is also therefore effectively zero. Pressure force, however, remains unaffected by the boundary layer. Therefore, within the boundary layer, pressure force dominates and fluid moves along the bottom of the stream from the outside bend to the inside bend. This initiates helicoidal flow: along the stream bed, fluid roughly follows the curve of the channel but is also forced toward the inside bend; away from the river bed, fluid also roughly follows the curve of the channel but is forced, to some extent, from the inside to the outside bend.

The higher velocities at the outside bend lead to higher shear stresss and therefore result in erosion. Similarly, lower velocities at the inside bend cause lower shear stresses and deposition occurs. Thus meander bends erode at the outside bend, causing the stream to become increasingly sinuous (until cutoff events occur). Deposition at the inside bend occurs such that for most natural meandering rivers, the river width remains nearly constant, even as the river evolves.

In a speech before the Prussian Academy of Sciences in 1926, Albert Einstein suggested that because the Coriolis force of the earth can cause a small imbalance in velocity distribution, such that velocity on one bank is higher than on the other, it could trigger erosion on one bank and deposition of sediment on the other that produces meanders However, Coriolis forces are likely insignificant compared with other forces acting to produce meanders.

== Geometry ==
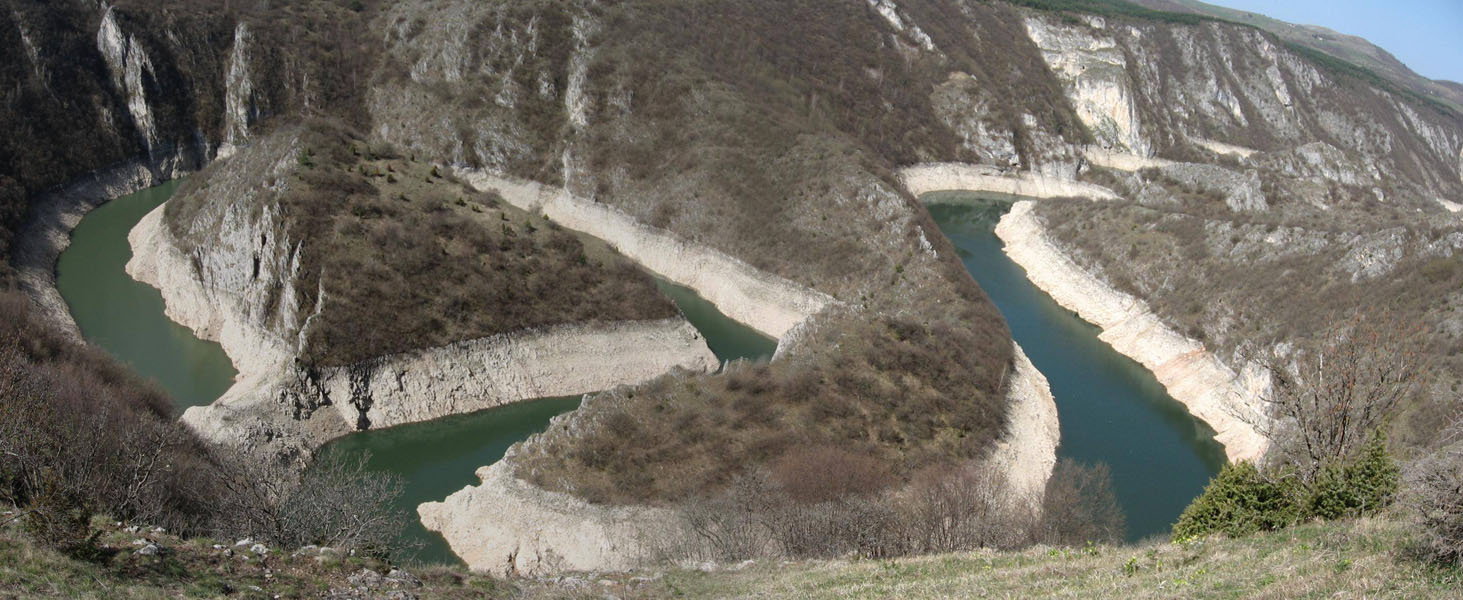
Uvac canyon meander, Serbia

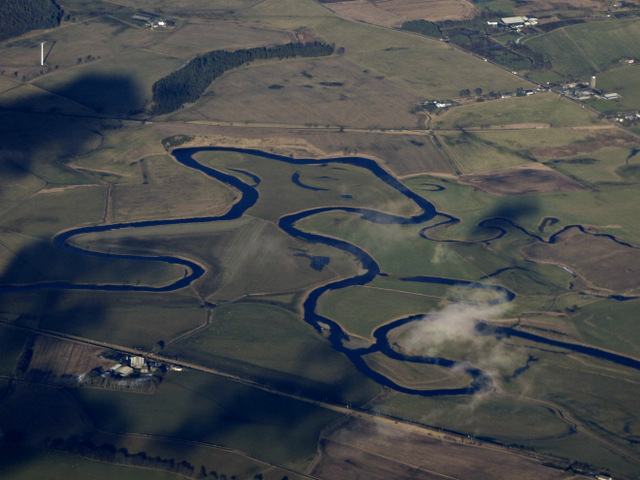
Meanders on the River Clyde, Scotland

The technical description of a meandering watercourse is termed meander geometry or meander planform geometry. It is characterized as an irregular waveform. Ideal waveforms, such as a sine wave, are one line thick, but in the case of a stream the width must be taken into consideration. The bankfull width is the distance across the bed at an average cross-section at the full-stream level, typically estimated by the line of lowest vegetation.

As a waveform the meandering stream follows the down-valley axis, a straight line fitted to the curve such that the sum of all the amplitudes measured from it is zero. This axis represents the overall direction of the stream.

At any cross-section the flow is following the sinuous axis, the centerline of the bed. Two consecutive crossing points of sinuous and down-valley axes define a meander loop. The meander is two consecutive loops pointing in opposite transverse directions. The distance of one meander along the down-valley axis is the meander length or wavelength. The maximum distance from the down-valley axis to the sinuous axis of a loop is the meander width or amplitude. The course at that point is the apex.

In contrast to sine waves, the loops of a meandering stream are more nearly circular. The curvature varies from a maximum at the apex to zero at a crossing point (straight line), also called an inflection, because the curvature changes direction in that vicinity. The radius of the loop is the straight line perpendicular to the down-valley axis intersecting the sinuous axis at the apex. As the loop is not ideal, additional information is needed to characterize it. The orientation angle is the angle between sinuous axis and down-valley axis at any point on the sinuous axis.

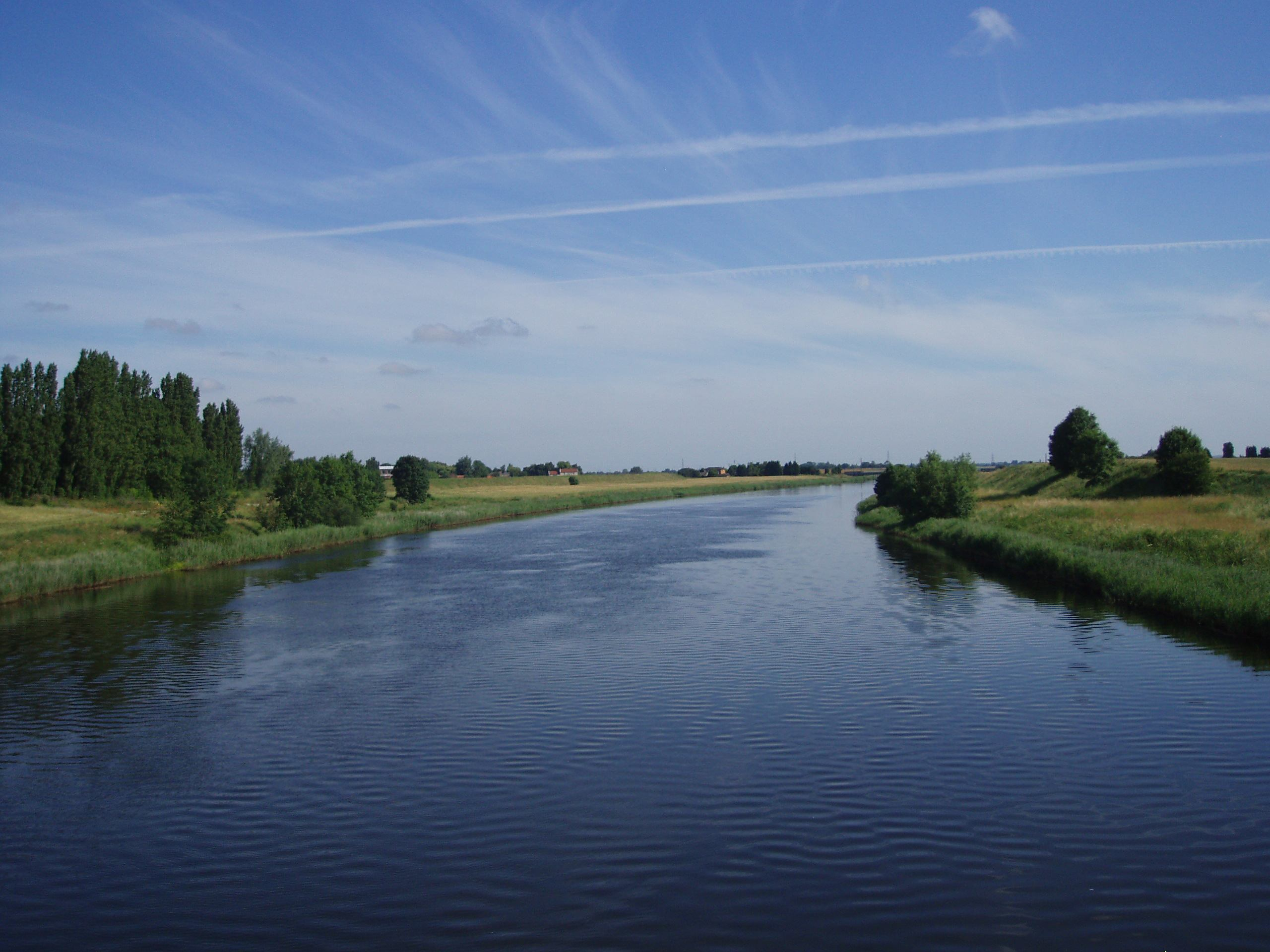
Concave bank and convex bank, Great Ouse Relief Channel, England

A loop at the apex has an outer or concave bank and an inner or convex bank. The meander belt is defined by an average meander width measured from outer bank to outer bank instead of from centerline to centerline. If there is a floodplain, it extends beyond the meander belt. The meander is then said to be free—it can be found anywhere in the floodplain. If there is no floodplain, the meanders are fixed.

Various mathematical formulae relate the variables of the meander geometry. As it turns out some numerical parameters can be established, which appear in the formulae. The waveform depends ultimately on the characteristics of the flow but the parameters are independent of it and apparently are caused by geologic factors. In general the meander length is 10–14 times, with an average 11 times, the fullbank channel width and 3 to 5 times, with an average of 4.7 times, the radius of curvature at the apex. This radius is 2–3 times the channel width.

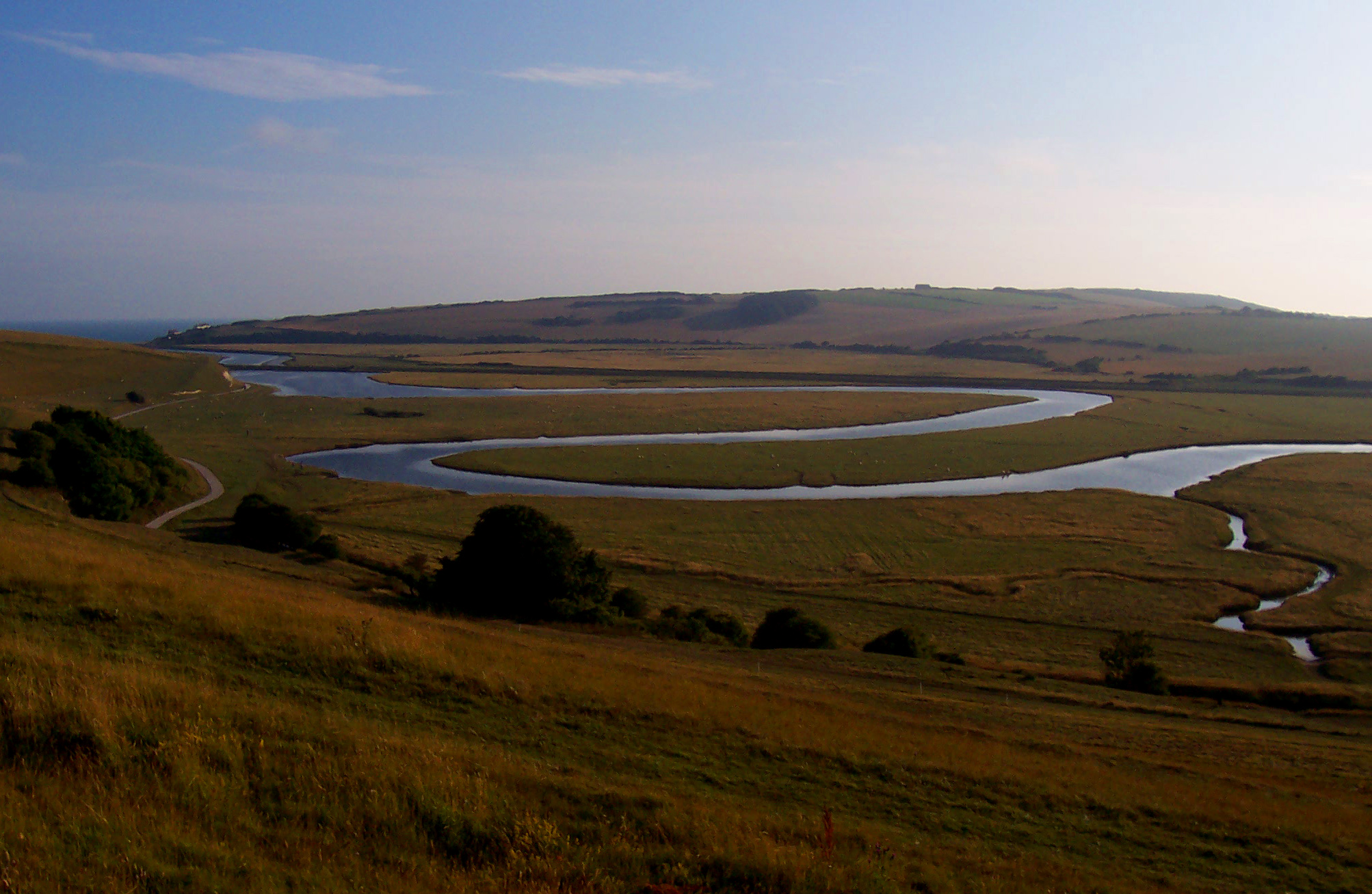
Meander of the River Cuckmere in East Sussex, Southern England

A meander has a depth pattern as well. The cross-overs are marked by riffles, or shallow beds, while at the apices are pools. In a pool direction of flow is downward, scouring the bed material. The major volume, however, flows more slowly on the inside of the bend where, due to decreased velocity, it deposits sediment.

The line of maximum depth, or channel, is the thalweg or thalweg line. It is typically designated the borderline when rivers are used as political borders. The thalweg hugs the outer banks and returns to center over the riffles. The meander arc length is the distance along the thalweg over one meander. The stream length is the length along the centerline.

== Formation ==
Life history of a meander

Once a channel begins to follow a sinusoidal path, the amplitude and concavity of the loops increase dramatically. This is due to the effect of helical flow which sweeps dense eroded material towards the inside of the bend, and leaves the outside of the bend unprotected and vulnerable to accelerated erosion. This establishes a positive feedback loop. In the words of Elizabeth A. Wood: "...this process of making meanders seems to be a self-intensifying process...in which greater curvature results in more erosion of the bank, which results in greater curvature..."

The cross-current along the floor of the channel is part of the secondary flow and sweeps dense eroded material towards the inside of the bend. The cross-current then rises to the surface near the inside and flows towards the outside, forming the helical flow. The greater the curvature of the bend, and the faster the flow, the stronger is the cross-current and the sweeping. Due to the conservation of angular momentum the speed on the inside of the bend is faster than on the outside.

Since the flow velocity is diminished, so is the centrifugal pressure. The pressure of the super-elevated column prevails, developing an unbalanced gradient that moves water back across the bottom from the outside to the inside. The flow is supplied by a counter-flow across the surface from the inside to the outside. This phenomenon is similar to the tea leaf paradox. This secondary flow carries sediment from the outside of the bend to the inside making the river more meandering. As to why streams of any size become sinuous in the first place, there are a number of theories, not necessarily mutually exclusive.

=== Stochastic theory ===
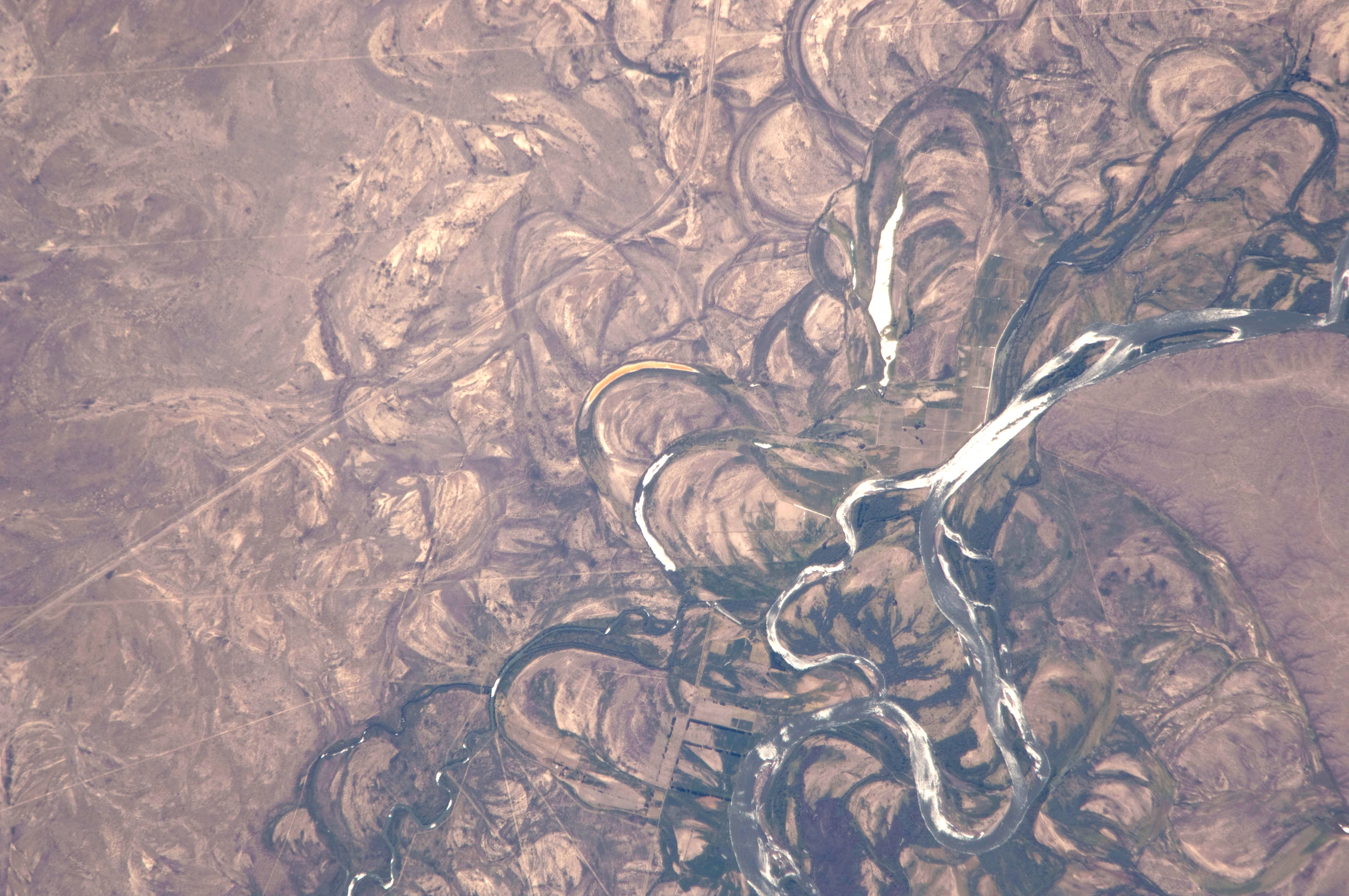
Meander scars, oxbow lakes and abandoned meanders in the broad flood plain of the Rio Negro, Argentina. 2010 photo from ISS.

The stochastic theory can take many forms but one of the most general statements is that of Scheidegger: "The meander train is assumed to be the result of the stochastic fluctuations of the direction of flow due to the random presence of direction-changing obstacles in the river path." Given a flat, smooth, tilted artificial surface, rainfall runs off it in sheets, but even in that case adhesion of water to the surface and cohesion of drops produce rivulets at random. Natural surfaces are rough and erodible to different degrees. The result of all the physical factors acting at random is channels that are not straight, which then progressively become sinuous. Even channels that appear straight have a sinuous thalweg that leads eventually to a sinuous channel.

=== Equilibrium theory ===
In the equilibrium theory, meanders decrease the stream gradient until an equilibrium between the erodibility of the terrain and the transport capacity of the stream is reached. A mass of water descending must give up potential energy, which, given the same velocity at the end of the drop as at the beginning, is removed by interaction with the material of the stream bed. The shortest distance; that is, a straight channel, results in the highest energy per unit of length, disrupting the banks more, creating more sediment and aggrading the stream. The presence of meanders allows the stream to adjust the length to an equilibrium energy per unit length in which the stream carries away all the sediment that it produces.

=== Geomorphic and morphotectonic theory ===
Geomorphic refers to the surface structure of the terrain. Morphotectonic means having to do with the deeper, or tectonic (plate) structure of the rock. The features included under these categories are not random and guide streams into non-random paths. They are predictable obstacles that instigate meander formation by deflecting the stream. For example, the stream might be guided into a fault line (morphotectonic).

== Associated landforms ==
=== Cut bank ===
A cut bank is an often vertical bank or cliff that forms where the outside, concave bank of a meander cuts into the floodplain or valley wall of a stream. A cutbank is also known either as a river-cut cliff, river cliff, or a bluff and spelled as cutbank. Erosion that forms a cut bank occurs at the outside bank of a meander because helicoidal flow of water keeps the bank washed clean of loose sand, silt, and sediment and subjects it to constant erosion. As a result, the meander erodes and migrates in the direction of the outside bend, forming the cut bank.

As the cut bank is undermined by erosion, it commonly collapses as it slumps into the channel. The slumped sediment, having been broken up by slumping, is readily eroded and carried toward the middle of the channel. The sediment eroded from a cut bank tends to be deposited on the point bar of the next downstream meander, and not on the point bar opposite it. This can be seen in areas where trees grow on the banks; on the inside of meanders, trees, such as willows, are often far from the bank, whilst on the outside of the bend, the tree roots are often exposed and undercut, eventually leading the trees to fall into the river.

=== Meander cutoff ===
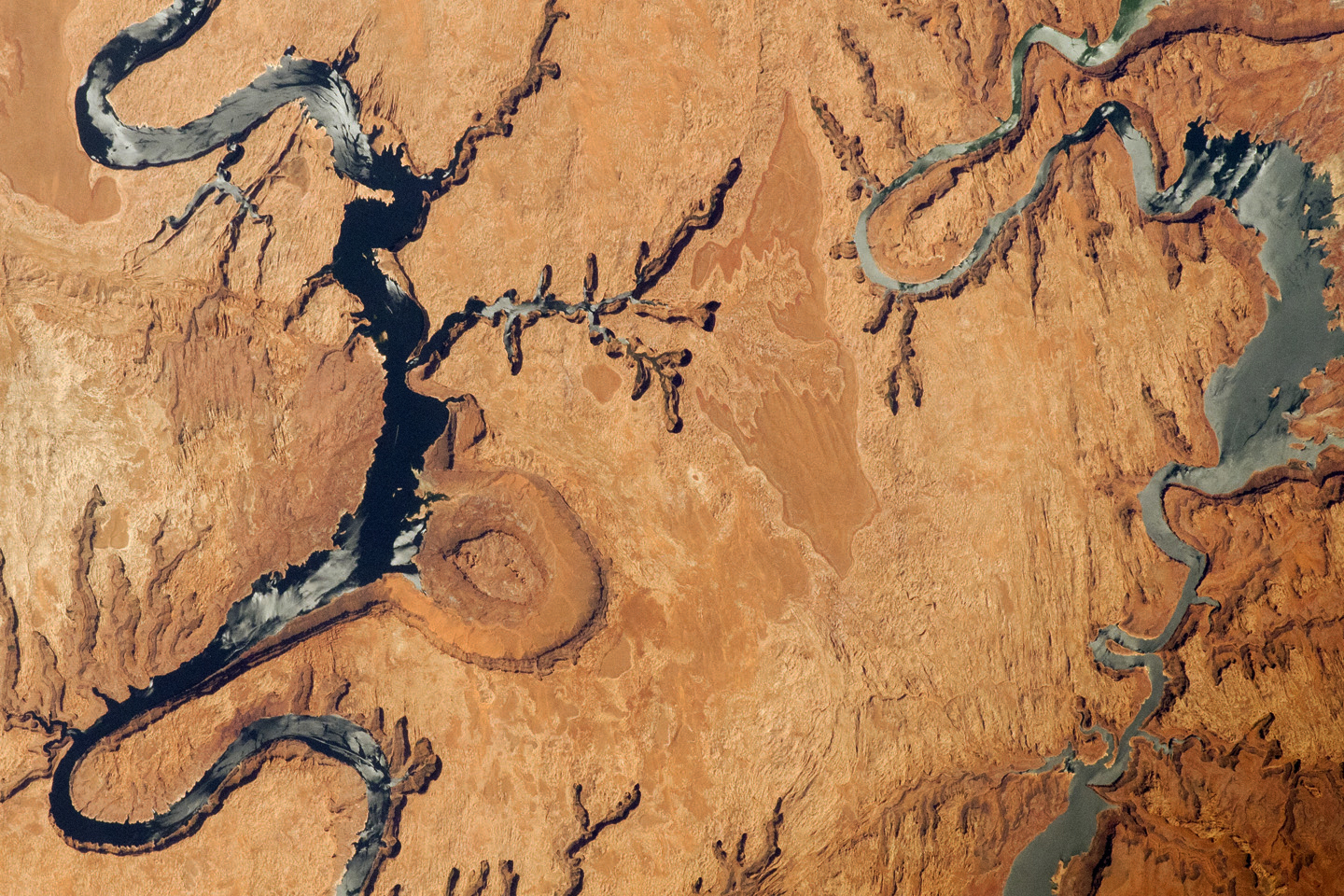
The rincon on Lake Powell in southern Utah is an incised cutoff (abandoned) meander.

A meander cutoff, also known as either a cutoff meander or abandoned meander, is a meander that has been abandoned by its stream after the formation of a neck cutoff. A lake that occupies a cutoff meander is known as an oxbow lake. Cutoff meanders that have cut downward into the underlying bedrock are known in general as incised cutoff meanders. As in the case of the Anderson Bottom Rincon, incised meanders that have either steep-sided, often vertical walls, are often, but not always, known as rincons in the southwest United States. Rincon in English is a nontechnical word in the southwest United States for either a small secluded valley, an alcove or angular recess in a cliff, or a bend in a river.

=== Incised meanders ===
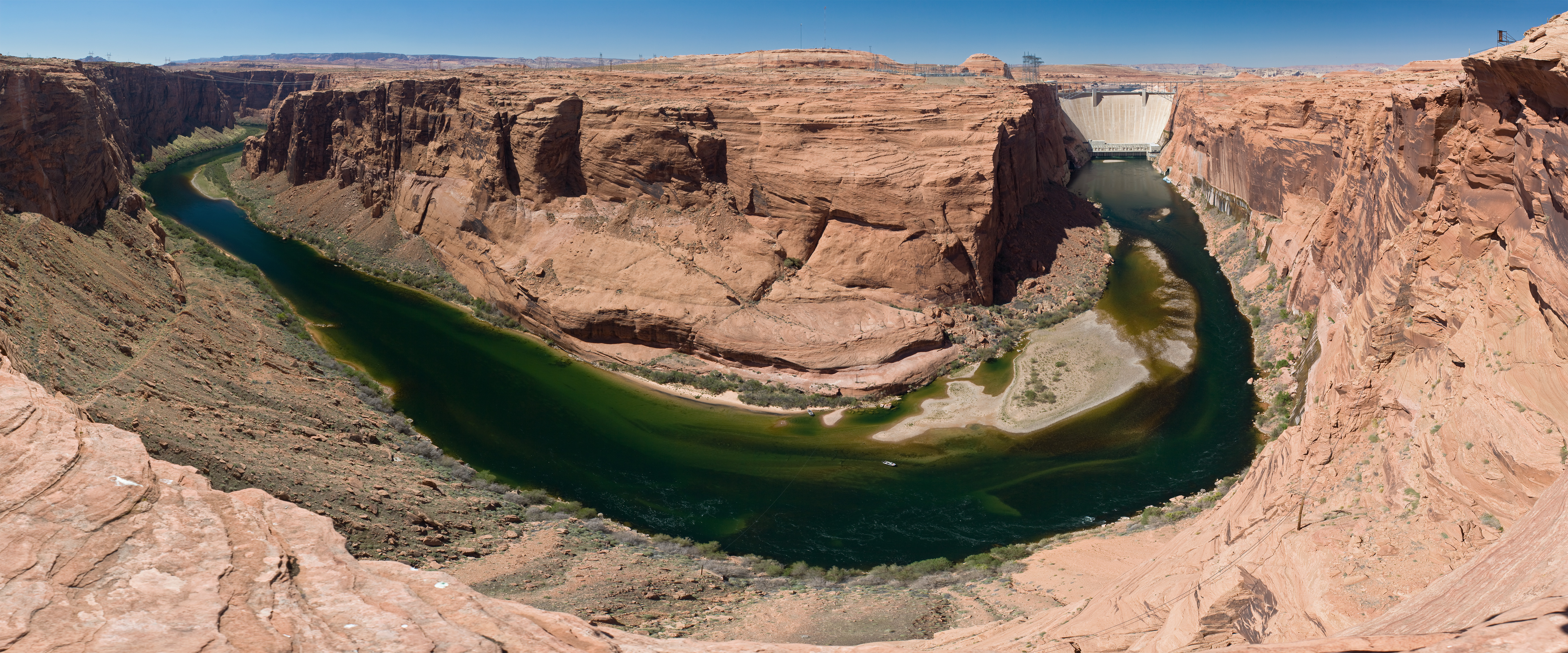
Glen Canyon, US

The meanders of a stream that has cut its bed down into the bedrock are known as either incised, intrenched, entrenched, inclosed or ingrown meanders. Some Earth scientists recognize and use a finer subdivision of incised meanders. Thornbury argues that incised or inclosed meanders are synonyms that are appropriate to describe any meander incised downward into bedrock and defines enclosed or entrenched meanders as a subtype of incised meanders (inclosed meanders) characterized by a symmetrical valley sides. He argues that the symmetrical valley sides are the direct result of rapid down-cutting of a watercourse into bedrock. In addition, as proposed by Rich, Thornbury argues that incised valleys with a pronounced asymmetry of cross section, which he called ingrown meanders, are the result of the lateral migration and incision of a meander during a period of slower channel downcutting. Regardless, the formation of both entrenched meanders and ingrown meanders is thought to require that base level falls as a result of either relative change in mean sea level, isostatic or tectonic uplift, the breach of an ice or landslide dam, or regional tilting. Classic examples of incised meanders are associated with rivers in the Colorado Plateau, the Kentucky River Palisades in central Kentucky, and streams in the Ozark Plateau.

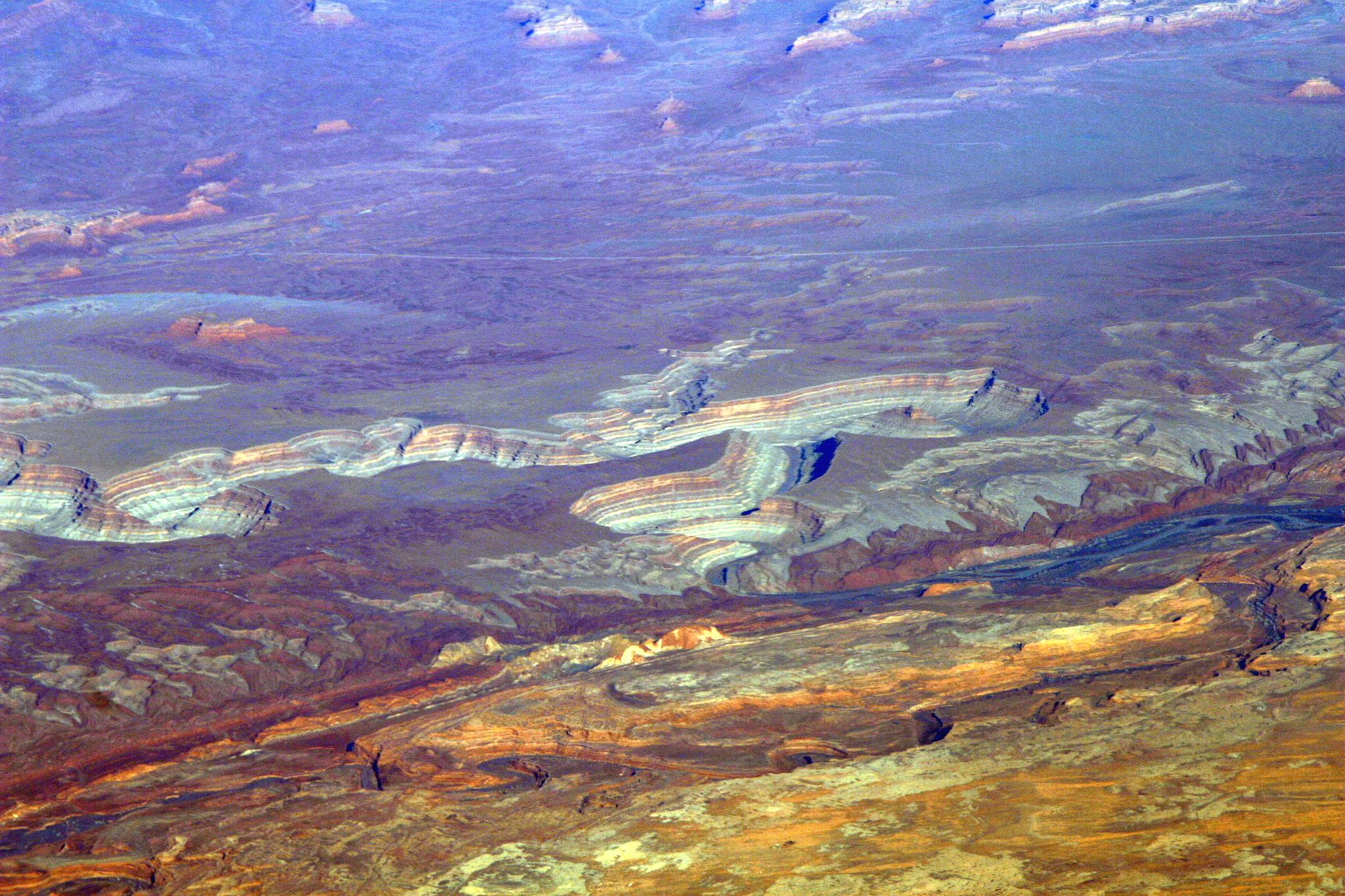
Goosenecks of the San Juan River, SE Utah. There is a cut-off meander at right center.

As noted above, it was initially either argued or presumed that an incised meander is characteristic of an antecedent stream or river that had incised its channel into underlying strata. An antecedent stream or river is one that maintains its original course and pattern during incision despite the changes in underlying rock topography and rock types. However, later geologists argue that the shape of an incised meander is not always, if ever, "inherited", e.g., strictly from an antecedent meandering stream where its meander pattern could freely develop on a level floodplain. Instead, they argue that as fluvial incision of bedrock proceeds, the stream course is significantly modified by variations in rock type and fractures, faults, and other geological structures into either lithologically conditioned meanders or structurally controlled meanders.

=== Oxbow lakes ===
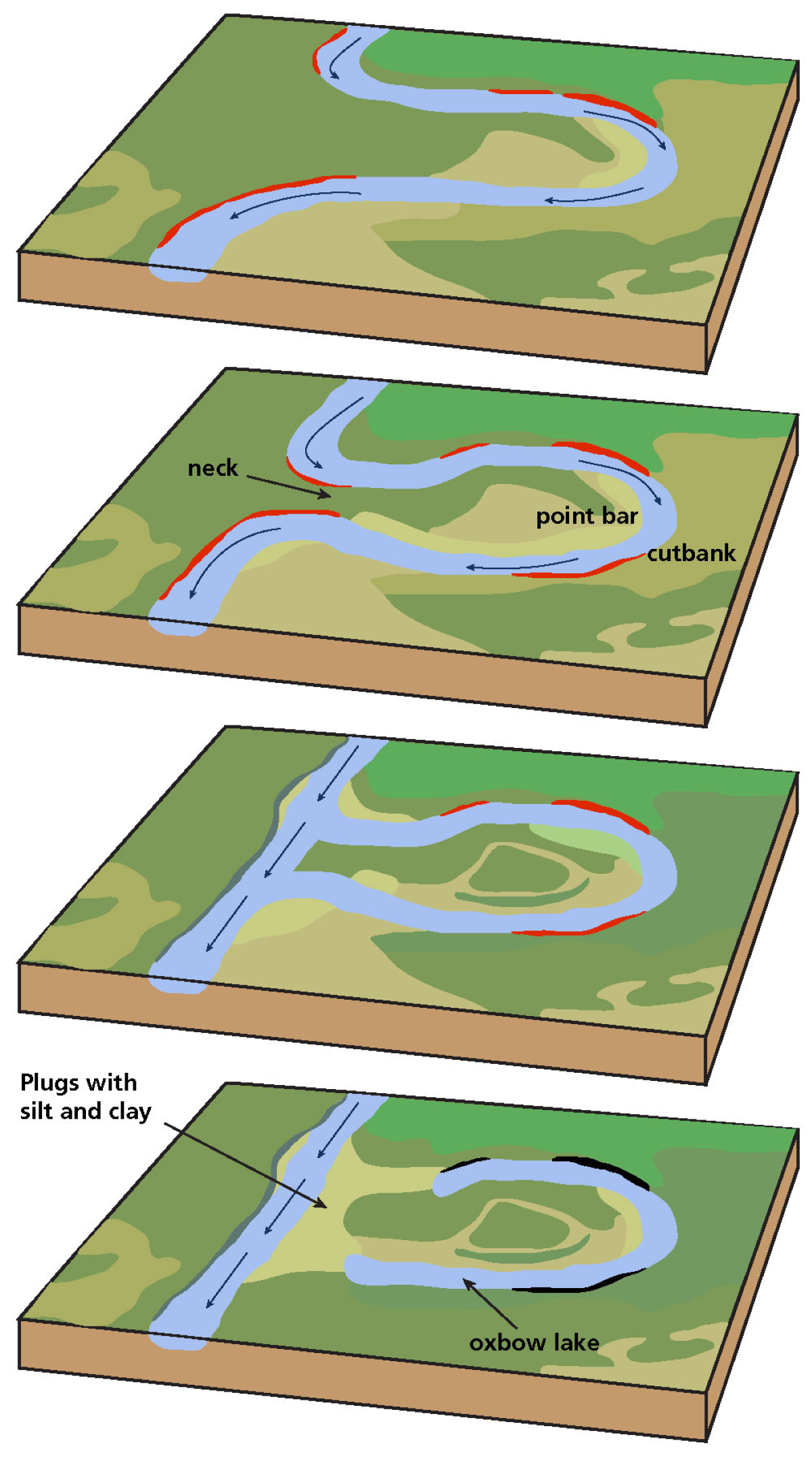
Meandering rivers continuously erode and redeposit sediment along their bends, later forming oxbow lakes.

The oxbow lake, which is the most common type of fluvial lake, is a crescent-shaped lake that derives its name from its distinctive curved shape. Oxbow lakes are also known as cutoff lakes. Such lakes form regularly in undisturbed floodplains as a result of the normal process of fluvial meandering. Either a river or stream forms a sinuous channel as the outer side of its bends are eroded away and sediments accumulate on the inner side, which forms a meandering horseshoe-shaped bend. Eventually as the result of its meandering, the fluvial channel cuts through the narrow neck of the meander and forms a cutoff meander. The final break-through of the neck, which is called a neck cutoff, often occurs during a major flood because that is when the watercourse is out of its banks and can flow directly across the neck and erode it with the full force of the flood.

After a cutoff meander is formed, river water flows into its end from the river builds small delta-like feature into either end of it during floods. These delta-like features block either end of the cutoff meander to form a stagnant oxbow lake that is separated from the flow of the fluvial channel and independent of the river. During floods, the flood waters deposit fine-grained sediment into the oxbow lake. As a result, oxbow lakes tend to become filled in with fine-grained, organic-rich sediments over time.

=== Point bar ===
A point bar, which is also known as a meander bar, is a fluvial bar that is formed by the slow, often episodic, addition of individual accretions of noncohesive sediment on the inside bank of a meander by the accompanying migration of the channel toward its outer bank. This process is called lateral accretion. Lateral accretion occurs mostly during high water or floods when the point bar is submerged. Typically, the sediment consists of either sand, gravel, or a combination of both. The sediment comprising some point bars might grade downstream into silty sediments. Because of the decreasing velocity and strength of current from the thalweg of the channel to the upper surface of point bar when the sediment is deposited the vertical sequence of sediments comprising a point bar becomes finer upward within an individual point bar. For example, it is typical for point bars to fine upward from gravel at the base to fine sands at the top. The source of the sediment is typically upstream cut banks from which sand, rocks and debris has been eroded, swept, and rolled across the bed of the river and downstream to the inside bank of a river bend. On the inside bend, this sediment and debris is eventually deposited on the slip-off slope of a point bar.

=== Scroll-bars ===
Scroll-bars are a result of continuous lateral migration of a meander loop that creates an asymmetrical ridge and swale topography on the inside of the bends. The topography is generally parallel to the meander, and is related to migrating bar forms and back bar chutes, which carve sediment from the outside of the curve and deposit sediment in the slower flowing water on the inside of the loop, in a process called lateral accretion. Scroll-bar sediments are characterized by cross-bedding and a pattern of fining upward. These characteristics are a result of the dynamic river system, where larger grains are transported during high energy flood events and then gradually die down, depositing smaller material with time (Batty 2006). Deposits for meandering rivers are generally homogeneous and laterally extensive unlike the more heterogeneous braided river deposits. There are two distinct patterns of scroll-bar depositions; the eddy accretion scroll bar pattern and the point-bar scroll pattern. When looking down the river valley they can be distinguished because the point-bar scroll patterns are convex and the eddy accretion scroll bar patterns are concave.

Scroll bars often look lighter at the tops of the ridges and darker in the swales. This is because the tops can be shaped by wind, either adding fine grains or by keeping the area unvegetated, while the darkness in the swales can be attributed to silts and clays washing in during high water periods. This added sediment in addition to water that catches in the swales is in turn is a favorable environment for vegetation that will also accumulate in the swales.

=== Slip-off slope ===
Depending upon whether a meander is part of an entrenched river or part of a freely meandering river within a floodplain, the term slip-off slope can refer to two different fluvial landforms that comprise the inner, convex, bank of a meander loop. In case of a freely meandering river on a floodplain, a slip-off slope is the inside, gently sloping bank of a meander on which sediments episodically accumulate to form a point bar as a river meanders. This type of slip-off slope is located opposite the cutbank. This term can also be applied to the inside, sloping bank of a meandering tidal channel.

In case of an entrenched river, a slip-off slope is a gently sloping bedrock surface that rises from the inside, concave bank of an asymmetrically entrenched river. This type of slip-off slope is often covered by a thin, discontinuous layer of alluvium. It is produced by the gradual outward migration of the meander as a river cuts downward into bedrock. A terrace on the slip-off slope of a meander spur, known as slip-off slope terrace, can be formed by a brief halt during the irregular incision by an actively meandering river.

== Derived quantities ==
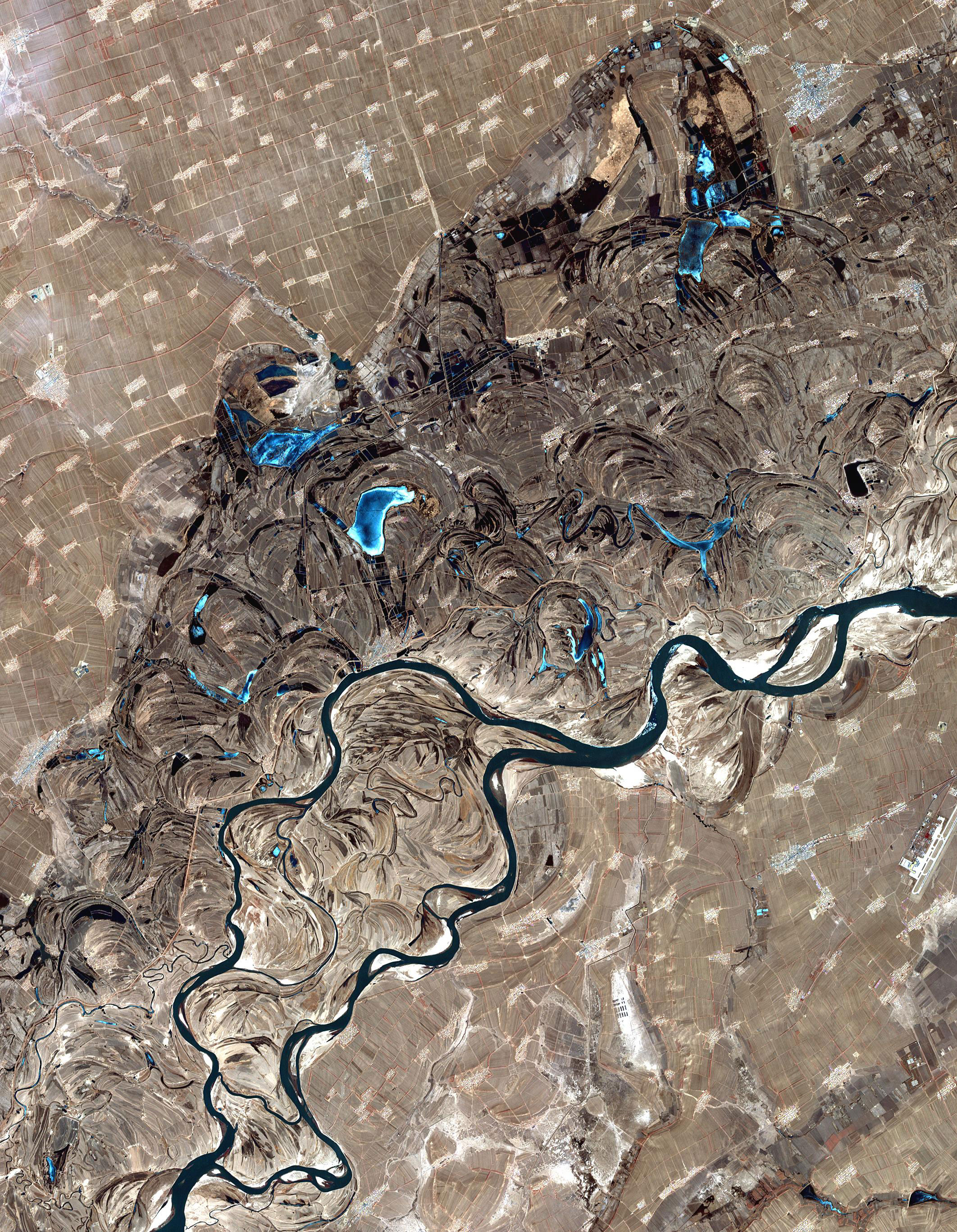
Meanders, scroll-bars and oxbow lakes in the Songhua River

The meander ratio or sinuosity index is a means of quantifying how much a river or stream meanders (how much its course deviates from the shortest possible path). It is calculated as the length of the stream divided by the length of the valley. A perfectly straight river would have a meander ratio of 1 (it would be the same length as its valley), while the higher this ratio is above 1, the more the river meanders.

Sinuosity indices are calculated from the map or from an aerial photograph measured over a distance called the reach, which should be at least 20 times the average fullbank channel width. The length of the stream is measured by channel, or thalweg, length over the reach, while the bottom value of the ratio is the downvalley length or air distance of the stream between two points on it defining the reach.

The sinuosity index plays a part in mathematical descriptions of streams. The index may require elaboration, because the valley may meander as well—i.e., the downvalley length is not identical to the reach. In that case the valley index is the meander ratio of the valley while the channel index is the meander ratio of the channel. The channel sinuosity index is the channel length divided by the valley length and the standard sinuosity index is the channel index divided by the valley index. Distinctions may become even more subtle.

Sinuosity Index has a non-mathematical utility as well. Streams can be placed in categories arranged by it; for example, when the index is between 1 and 1.5 the river is sinuous, but if between 1.5 and 4, then meandering. The index is a measure also of stream velocity and sediment load, those quantities being maximized at an index of 1 (straight).

== See also ==
- List of old waterbodies of the Rhine
- Baer's law
- Billabong
- Crevasse splay
- Helicoidal flow
- Jet stream
- Meander cutoffs in Avulsion (river)
- Meander scar
- Riffle-pool sequence

== General and cited references ==
- Hickin, Edward J. (2003). "Meandering Channels". In Middleton, Gerard V. (ed.). Encyclopedia of Sediments and Sedimentary Rocks. Kluwer Academic Encyclopedia of Earth Sciences. Dordrecht; Boston: Kluwer Academic Publishers. pp. 430–434. ISBN 1-4020-0872-4.
- Leopold, Luna B.; Langbein, W. B. (June 1966). "River Meanders". Scientific American. 214 (6): 60. Bibcode:1966SciAm.214f..60L. doi:10.1038/scientificamerican0666-60.
- Thonemann, P., The Maeander Valley: A historical geography from Antiquity to Byzantium (Cambridge, 2011). Greek Culture in the Roman World Series.
