= World Birding Center =

Nature preserves in Rio Grande Valley, Texas, US

The World Birding Center is the official title given to a combined nine parks and nature preserves in the Rio Grande Valley region of Texas managed by a partnership of the Texas Parks and Wildlife Department, the United States Fish and Wildlife Service, and the local communities in which the parks reside. The stated mission of the World Birding Center is to "protect native habitat while increasing the understanding and appreciation of the birds and wildlife", with an additional emphasis on promoting local economic development through ecotourism.

== Features ==
Encompassing over 10,000 acres (16 square miles) of preserved land extending along a 120-mile (190 km) river corridor between the small town of Roma, Texas, and the outer barrier island of South Padre Island, the park system hosts a large amount of native biodiversity with over 500 recorded species of birds, and serves as potential habitat for locally endangered wild cat species such as the ocelot and jaguarundi, as well as sanctuary for much of the other flora and fauna of the last remaining native Tamaulipan brushland.

== Parks and preserves ==
=== Bentsen-Rio Grande Valley State Park ===
The Bentsen-Rio Grande Valley State Park is known for impressive bird-viewing opportunities, with 358 species documented within the park boundaries. The 760-acre (310 ha) park was acquired in 1944 for the price of US$1 from the Bentsen family with the stipulation that it be used "solely for Public Park purposes." It was initially preserved from agricultural use by the family due to the presence of beautiful native Ebony trees.

The World Birding Center has its headquarters at this site, and the structures were designed by the Lake Flato architectural firm, known for their attention to sustainable architecture. The resulting buildings and grounds were named one of the top ten green designs for 2006 by the American Institute of Architects Committee on the Environment (AIA/COTE).

=== Edinburg Scenic Wetlands World Birding Center ===
A 40-acre (16 ha) site situated within a municipal park in the city of Edinburg, Texas. Notable in that it was developed through re-vegetation of agricultural lands and exists entirely in an urban setting.

=== Estero Llano Grande State Park ===
The Estero Llano Grande State Park is a 230-acre park built partially on reclaimed agricultural land. Known best for its wetlands including "Alligator Lake" (a restored oxbow of the Arroyo Colorado), which is named for both the presence alligators, as well as its shape. The review of park alligator safety tips is recommended.

=== Harlingen Arroyo Colorado World Birding Center ===
An urban center consisting of multiple close by parks which follow the Arroyo Colorado waterway, with Harlingen Thicket Park bordering the west side, and the Hugh Ramsey Nature Park on the east, and McKelvey park situated in between. There are numerous paved and unpaved hike and bike trails within the parks, but they do not completely interconnect the site.

=== Old Hidalgo Pumphouse Museum and World Birding Center ===
Historic museum and birding center featuring five-mile hike and bike trail, as well as historic steam-powered irrigation pump house. Visitors can still view the antique boilers and infrastructure used to irrigate the farmland around the city of Hidalgo during the early 20th century.

=== Quinta Mazatlan Historical Mansion and World Birding Center ===
An urban 20-acre estate preserve centered around a Spanish Revival Style mansion with a mission focused on education and environmental stewardship. The site participates in the education of 10,000 students annually. Also features "Native Plant Walks" and programs on natural history of the Rio Grande Valley for the general public.

=== Resaca de la Palma State Park ===
The Resaca de la Palma State Park, site of the historical Battle of Resaca de la Palma early in the Mexican–American War, the park features 1,200 acres (490 ha) of native semi-tropical brushland. There are many opportunities for guided wildlife viewing, including an interpretive "Nature Tram Tour", as well as hiking and biking trails.

=== Roma Bluffs World Birding Center ===
Located in the historic city of Roma, Texas, which was once the furthest port upstream for steamboats on the Rio Grande. The center is located on scenic bluffs situated 120 feet (37 m) above the river, which allows good viewing including across the International Bridge to Ciudad Miguel Alemán, in Mexico and the surrounding area. A small site, it is also the westernmost point of the World Birding Center.

=== South Padre Island Birding and Nature Center ===
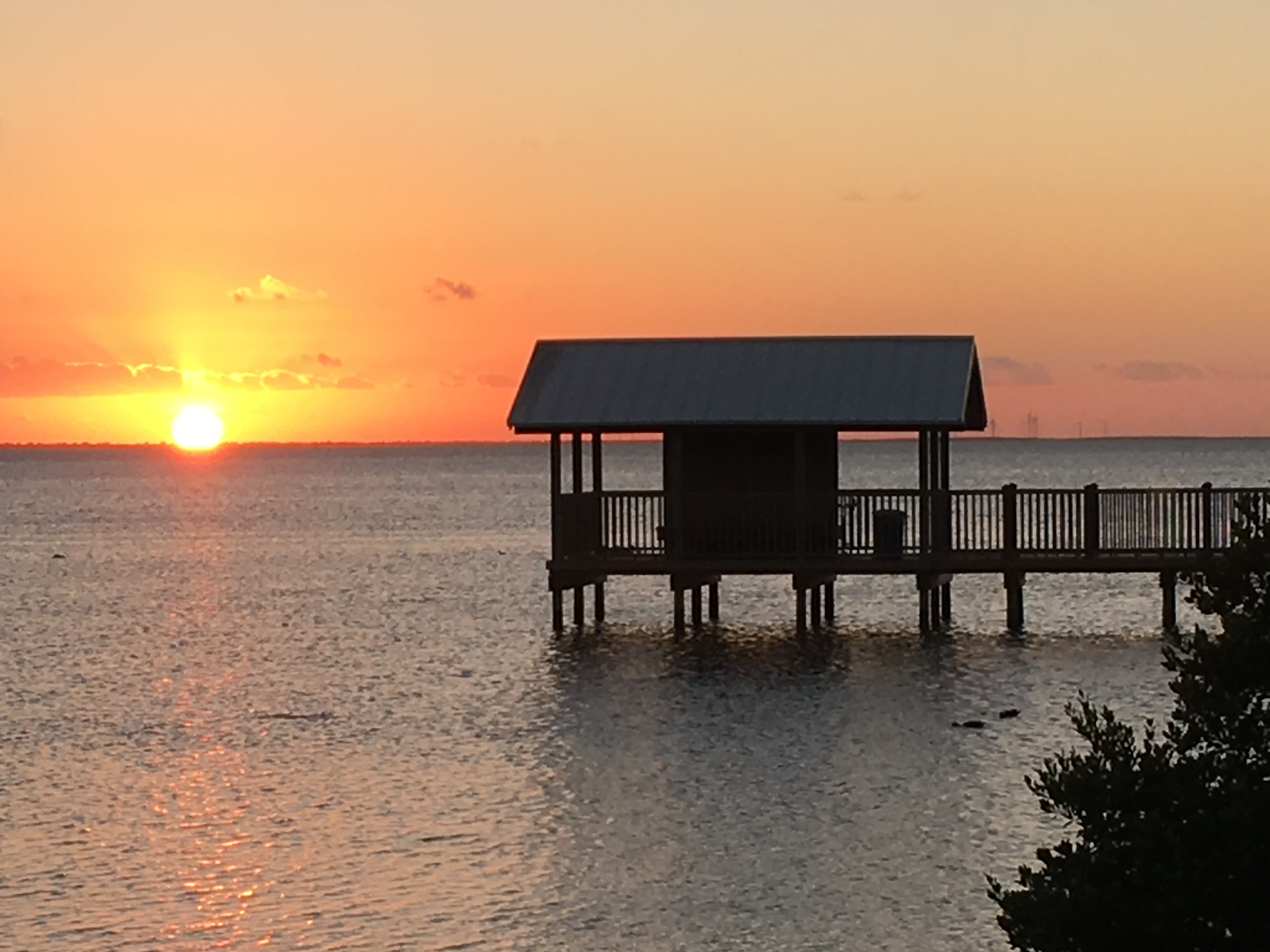
Boardwalk of South Padre Island Birding and Nature Center at Sunset

A 50-acre (20 ha) bayside preserve which features a five-story viewing tower facing the Laguna Madre Bay, more than half a mile of boardwalk, and a man-made wetland using fresh water from the island's adjacent water treatment plant, which serves to attract numerous species of local and migrant birds.

== Educational outreach ==
The World Birding Center does provide numerous forms of educational outreach including "Nature Camp" for children, a website photo gallery and sound library of commonly encountered birds for the region, and individually tailored bird "checklists" for each of their sites.

== See also ==
- Great Texas Coastal Birding Trail
- Laguna Atascosa National Wildlife Refuge
- Sabal Palm Sanctuary
- Santa Ana National Wildlife Refuge
