= Saint Joseph Academy (Brownsville, Texas) =

Location
- 101 St. Joseph Drive; Brownsville, (Cameron County), Texas 78520; United States; 25°55′7″N 97°30′.57″W

Information
- Type: Private, coeducational
- Motto: Ad Astra Per Aspera (To the Stars through Difficulties)
- Religious affiliations: Roman Catholic; Marist Brothers
- Established: 1865
- President: Michael Motyl
- Principal: Melissa Valadez
- Faculty: 41 full-time
- Grades: 7–12
- Enrollment: 430 (2022-2023)
- Average class size: 24
- Student to teacher ratio: 15:1
- Language: English only campus
- Campus type: open
- Colors: Red and white
- Athletics conference: TAPPS
- Mascot: Brutus the Bloodhound
- Team name: Bloodhounds
- Accreditation: Texas Catholic Conference of Bishops Education Department (TCCBED)
- Publication: PAW (literary magazine)
- Newspaper: Hound Collar
- Athletic Director: Tino Villareal
- Website: Official school website

Saint Joseph Academy, sometimes referred to as St. Joe or SJA, is a private school conducted by the Marist Brothers of the Schools. It is located in Brownsville, Texas, United States, and serves junior high and high school students of the lower Rio Grande Valley and Matamoros, Tamaulipas, Mexico. The school is located in the Roman Catholic Diocese of Brownsville.

== History ==
St. Joseph Academy was founded in 1865 by the Missionary Oblates of Mary Immaculate in the downtown area of Brownsville, Texas. The school closed and re-opened many times under the Oblates in its earliest years. In 1906, however, the Marist Brothers arrived from Mexico and re-opened St. Joseph Academy, and it has remained open ever since. Initially, SJA was an all-male elementary school. In 1926 a three-story building was constructed, known as the "Old Saint Joseph", where the International Bank of Commerce now stands in downtown.

In 1930, the first high school class graduated from St. Joseph, and by 1940, the Sisters of the Holy Ghost assumed the administration of the elementary school. The new campus, found at 101 St. Joseph Drive in Brownsville, Texas, relocated in 1959 from its historic downtown campus to its current campus on the wooded and picturesque banks of a resaca (a regional Spanish word for oxbow lake), serving boys from 7th to 12th grade. The original site became the parochial school for Sacred Heart Church (established 1912), under the direction of the religious order now known as the Sisters of the Holy Spirit and Mary Immaculate.

The new campus contained many architectural innovations, including separate low-profile classroom buildings centered around a large garden area of native flora, reminiscent of Mexican Alameda Central urban parks; unique offset vents and jalousie windows designed to maximize the cooling effect of southerly breezes; and the gymnasium with its award-winning design (highly unusual at the time) by which the entire weight of the structure is supported by four curved roof beams that meet at the center of the building.

The school was all-male until 1970, when Saint Joseph became co-educational and admitted its first female students into the 7th, 8th, and 9th grades. In 1998, the school switched from now-defunct TCIL to TAPPS, and by 2004, the construction of the new administration and middle school buildings began. On October 27, 2005, the buildings' dedication took place in the middle school gymnasium.

On 8 April 2008, the Mexican pop group RBD played at a private concert in Saint Joseph Academy's gymnasium after several students won a competition sponsored by Verizon Wireless.

By June 2012, the whole campus in SJA had wireless network connection.

== Mission statement ==
St. Joseph Academy, conducted by the Marist Brothers with the mission to serve the children of the lower portion of the Rio Grande Valley, is dedicated to provide a "religious and moral formation" and a college preparatory education under the tradition of the Roman Catholic Church. According to the official page of the school, the SJA endeavors to form students that will succeed in their university studies, understand and love Jesus Christ, and participate in the mission of the Church, including Catholic social teaching on the preferential option for the poor.

Every year, about 100 students and more than a dozen faculty members travel to several rural communities to do community services and conduct religious classes.

The school also has a community service requirement for each student during the school year, and that chore is set up by the religion professors. In the early 2000s, the missions program at St. Joseph travelled to Tula, Tamaulipas every year; in 2012, they traveled to a Native American reservation near Gallup, New Mexico on a 10-day trip.

== Athletics ==
At a high school level, SJA has baseball, basketball, cheerleading, dance team, cross country, football, golf, soccer, swimming, tennis, and track and field. In junior high, which is only from seventh to eighth grade, basketball, football, cross country, track and field and volleyball are available.

== Communities represented ==
Students attending Saint Joseph Academy come from the following communities in the Matamoros–Brownsville metropolitan area.

Cities in Mexico

- Matamoros, Tamaulipas

Cities in the U.S. (Texas)

- Brownsville
- Rancho Viejo
- Harlingen
- Olmito
- Raymondville
- San Pedro
- San Benito
- Los Frenos
- La Feria
- Port Isabel
- South Padre Island

== Notable alumni ==
- James Carlos Blake — prize-winning author of novels, novellas, short stories, and essays; current member of the Texas Institute of Letters
- Joey Fischer — senior student murdered in 1993; part of a murder case that brought national attention
- Buddy Garcia — appointed to the Railroad Commission of Texas by Governor Rick Perry on April 12, 2012
- Tony Garza — United States Ambassador to Mexico, former Texas Secretary of State
- Fernando de Leon — Mexican-born American businessman, investor and philanthropist
- Bianca Marroquín — Mexican musical theatre and television actress; first Latina to play in a starring role on Broadway
- Jose Rolando Olvera Jr. — United States District Judge United States District Court for the Southern District of Texas
- Federico Peña — U.S. Secretary of Transportation (1993–1997); U.S. Secretary of Energy (1997–1998); first Hispanic mayor of Denver, CO
- Robert Rodriguez — emergency physician at the San Francisco General Hospital; professor of emergency medicine at the UCSF School of Medicine; member of the COVID-19 Advisory Board of U.S. president Joe Biden
- Rudy Ruiz — Award-winning Latino author, entrepreneur and advocate
- Julian Schnabel — "neo-expressionist" painter; Academy Award-nominated, Golden Globe winner; director of The Diving Bell and the Butterfly
- Filemon Vela Jr. — United States U.S. Representative for 34th congressional district since 2013

== See also ==
- List of Marist Brothers schools
