= Resaca de la Palma State Park =

State park in Texas, United States

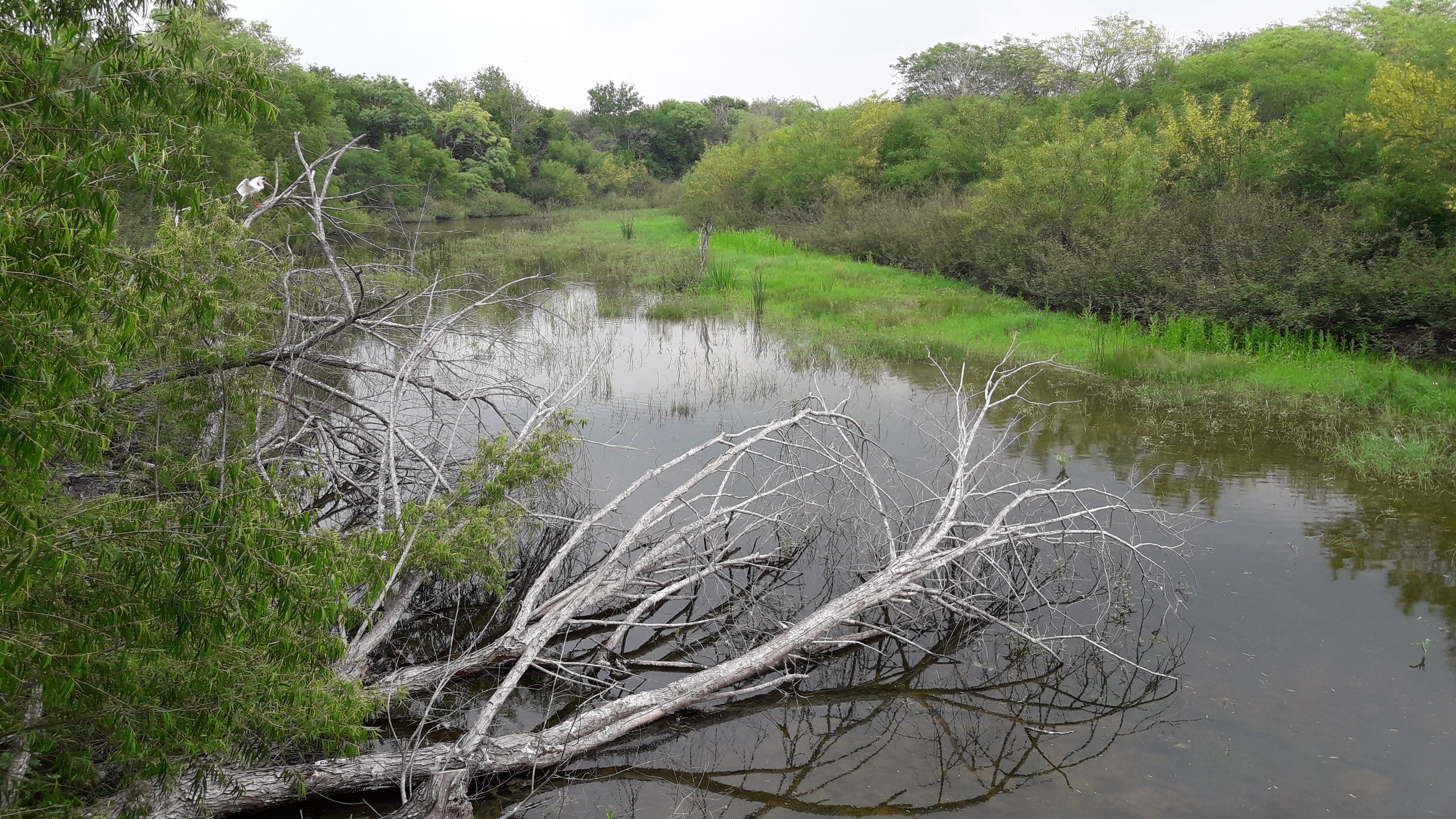
- Resaca on Mexican Olive Trail, Resaca de la Palma State Park

- Location within Texas Location within the United States
- Location: Cameron County, Texas
- Nearest city: Brownsville
- Coordinates: 25.996275°N 97.5712694°W
- Area: 1,200 acres (490 ha)
- Established: 1977
- Visitors: 17,148 (in 2025)
- Governing body: Texas Parks and Wildlife Department
- Website: Official site

Resaca de la Palma State Park is a 1,200 acres (490 ha) state park in Brownsville, Cameron County, Texas, United States. It is the largest of three state parks belonging to the World Birding Center. The park is managed by the Texas Parks and Wildlife Department and opened to the public in December 2008. A resaca is a type of oxbow lake that can be found in Texas, and is a former channel of the Rio Grande. It is naturally cut off from the river, having no inlet or outlet.

== World Birding Center ==
The World Birding Center is a partnership between the Texas Parks and Wildlife Department, U.S. Fish and Wildlife Service, and nine Rio Grande Valley communities. The center is dedicated to increasing the appreciation, understanding, and conservation of birds and other wildlife and their habitat. The center promotes the conservation and restoration of native woodland and wetland habitats along the lower Rio Grande. These habitats support diverse flora and fauna, including several endangered species as well as species occurring nowhere else in the United States. The World Birding Center's nine sites are located throughout Cameron, Hidalgo, and Starr counties.

== Activities ==
The primary activity at Resaca de la Palma State Park is birdwatching. The park offers several trails accessible for hiking and cycling. A tram tour is also available. Private vehicles are prohibited within the park. Other areas include observation decks, and a butterfly garden. The visitor center includes a state park store, as well as a meeting room.

== Nature ==
The park is in the Western Gulf coastal grasslands of Texas and part of the Tamaulipan mezquital of Texas and Mexico. The park has three types of habitats; woodland, savannah and wetland.

=== Animals ===
A few of the many bird species documented in the park are white-tipped dove, green jay, Altamira oriole, plain chachalaca, groove-billed ani, white-eyed vireo, long-billed thrasher, olive sparrow, northern mockingbird, white-tailed kite, Harris's hawk, least grebe, green heron, buff-bellied hummingbird, black-bellied whistling-duck, summer tanager, and yellow-breasted chat. This park is home to a vast population of butterflies and moths, lizards and snakes, and mammals, too. Endangered ocelots have been seen on the property, as well as Mexican long-nosed armadillos, collared peccaries, desert and eastern cottontails, common raccoons, opossums, invasive wild boars and nutria, bobcats, coyotes, eastern fox squirrels, North American least shrew, northern yellow bats, woodrats, and hispid cotton rats.

=== Plants ===
Trees in the park include mainly Texas persimmon and sugar hackberry in the woodland and honey mesquite, anacua and cenizo in the savannah.

== See also ==
- List of Texas state parks
- Rio Grande Valley
