= Vynthala =

- village
- Country: India
- State: Kerala
- District: Thrissur

Government
  - Body: Kadukutty Gram panchayat

Languages
  - Official: Malayalam, English
- Time zone: UTC+5:30 (IST)
- PIN: 680 741
- Telephone code: 0480
- Vehicle registration: KL-64
- Nearest city: Thrissur, Cochin
- Literacy: 100%
- Lok Sabha constituency: Chalakudy
- Civic agency: Kadukutty Grama panchayat
- Climate: Warm and humid (Köppen)
- Avg. summer temperature: 35 °C (95 °F)
- Avg. winter temperature: 25 °C (77 °F)

Vynthala is a very old village by the banks of Chalakudy River and 10 km (6 mi) from Chalakudy town in Thrissur district, state of Kerala, India. It is an old farming community and the main crop was rice. Other crops cultivated include: coconut trees and nutmeg. The main industry was the manufacture of roofing clay tiles by several companies engaged in that business. There is one high school (St. Mary's) and a Christian church (St. Joseph). At present both cultivation of rice and clay tile works are declining.

Vynthala is mother to one of the unique Oxbow lakes in the world, and one and only in southern India. It is called "Kanicham Thura" or Vynthala Lake. Centuries before Kanicham Thura was the part of Chalakudy river.
