= Murder of Joey Fischer =

1993 murder of American high schooler

- Born: Albert Joseph Fischer Jr. January 16, 1975; Brownsville, Texas, U.S.
- Died: March 3, 1993 (aged 18); Rancho Viejo, Texas, U.S.
- Cause of death: Gunshot wounds
- Resting place: Mont Meta Memorial Park; San Benito, Texas, U.S.
- Known for: Murder case

On March 3, 1993, Saint Joseph Academy high school senior Albert Joseph "Joey" Fischer Jr. was shot dead outside his home in Rancho Viejo, an upscale community north of Brownsville, Texas. Dora Cisneros, the mother of his ex-girlfriend, was responsible for orchestrating Fischer's murder after he broke up with her daughter Cristina. Joey Fischer and Cristina had broken up the previous summer, but Dora Cisneros became obsessed with their relationship and insisted that Fischer date her daughter again. After he refused a US$500 offer from Cisneros, she consulted a fortune teller, Maria Mercedes Martínez, to cast a spell on him.

The fortune teller told Cisneros she was unable to cast spells, but Cisneros insisted that she would pay to have someone beat him up. She decided later to have Fischer murdered instead, and told Martínez she was willing to pay US$3,000 to anyone who would kill him. Martínez offered to help, and Cisneros gave her the money and a photograph of Fischer. Martínez gave these to one of her clients, Daniel Orlando Garza. He contacted two Mexican hitmen from Matamoros, Tamaulipas, Israel Olivarez Cepeda and Heriberto Puentes Pizaña, who killed Fischer and then escaped to Mexico. The killing drew national attention because of the unusual circumstances surrounding the crime.

Garza, troubled by what he had done, confessed to the police that he acted as a middleman in Fischer's murder. He cooperated with the police to incriminate Martínez, who then aided in Cisneros's arrest. Cisneros and Garza were sentenced to life in prison by a state court in 1994, but Cisneros's sentence was overturned. She was convicted again in 1998 by a federal court and sentenced to life in prison. Martínez was given a 20-year sentence after pleading guilty and testifying against the two in court. Though U.S. officials tried to have the two assassins extradited, the hitmen never faced trial in Texas.

== Background ==
Albert Joseph "Joey" Fischer Jr. was born in Brownsville, Texas, on January 16, 1975. His parents were A. J. "Buddy" Fischer and Corinne Nelson. The couple divorced in 1987 and remarried separately. (Note: Buddy remarried a woman named Connie (not to be confused with Corinne, Fischer's biological mother). Both of them held executive roles at KEMET Corporation.) Fischer lived with his mother and his stepfather Vernon "Beau" Nelson. He was a senior honors student at Saint Joseph Academy (St. Joe), a Catholic private school in Brownsville. He had a 98.5 grade-point average, was ranked eleventh in his class, and was going to attend the honors program at the University of Texas at Austin upon graduation. At 18 years old, he enjoyed basketball and was a fan of the Los Angeles Lakers, loved computers, and talked about pursuing a career as an engineer. Along with two other classmates, he was voted "Most Sarcastic" by his high school class, and was known for sometimes acting foolish, and having a good sense of humor. He was also "often attracted to the more Latina girls of the school". During his junior year, he dated Cristina, who was a year younger than him. (Note: Another source spelled her name as Christina.) Most of Fischer's friends described her as quiet, although some said she was only reserved with people she did not know. Cristina's mother Dora Garcia Cisneros approved of Fischer's relationship with her daughter and thought he was potentially a good candidate for marriage. In Cisneros's eyes, Fischer was an overachieving student from a good family, and "wasn't wild, like many of the St. Joe boys".

Cisneros grew up in a well-off ranching family from Los Indios, Texas, and was married to David Cisneros, a surgeon from Brownsville. (Note: Local media sources described David Cisneros as a "prominent" surgeon from Brownsville. He graduated from the National Autonomous University of Mexico (UNAM) School of Medicine in 1966. His office was at 640 E. Price Road and he lived at 1545 Oriole Lane with his wife in Brownsville.) They had five children. She was a well-respected volunteer in the local medical community, and was president of the southern chapter of the Cameron-Willacy Counties Medical Society. The association where she volunteered helped raise funds for medical scholarships. In addition, people close to Cisneros said she was a practicing Catholic and that she cared a lot for her family. She volunteered at St. Joe, and was well-liked in the social group she was part of. Since Los Indios was mostly a ranching community close to the U.S.-Mexico border, Cisneros's religiosity was heavily influenced by curanderismo, a practice of religious and folk medicine healing rooted in ancient Mexican culture.

In Matamoros and Brownsville, curanderos—practitioners of curanderismo—offered works of white and black magic. These services are known as brujería (witchcraft). People consult healers and fortune tellers for help with relationships: to revive their romance, to end a marriage, to make someone fall in love, or to hurt someone. People also consult them to drive away negative energy, predict the future and dangerous events, to improve their health, or to bring positive energy. Cisneros grew closer to curanderismo after her firstborn, David, died after being thrown from a moving vehicle by a friend while he attended St. Joe as a student in 1974. People close to Cisneros described her as a person who endured several tragic events growing up. One of her uncles committed suicide when she was young, and her brother drowned as a teenager. But, several others who were close to her maintained that after her son died, Cisneros started to show signs of insanity, became more protective of her children, and began visiting local curanderas.

=== Relationship with girlfriend ===
Fischer and Cristina often did outdoor activities together, but Fischer's stepmother thought they were only friends. She said that she never saw them hold hands or behave in a way that suggested intimacy. According to his friends, Fischer went with Cristina to South Padre Island, Texas, during spring break and had sex with her in her parents' condominium. They said that he did not brag about it, and in fact seemed to regret his decision. Cristina denied this ever happened. Later that year they attended St. Joe's prom together. In June 1992, Fischer broke up with Cristina; he told one of his friends that their relationship was only physical, and he did not feel an emotional attachment to her. Fischer had given Cristina his class ring while they were dating, and once they broke up he asked her to return it. Cristina refused.

During the first weeks of the summer, Cisneros called Fischer several times and asked him why he had broken up with her daughter. He told her Cristina was very kind, but he wanted to be single and date other girls. Cisneros then called Fischer's father, Buddy, and asked him why his son had broken up with Cristina. Fischer was angry that Cristina did not return his ring, and wrote a letter to her saying that he wanted his ring in ten days, or he would take action. Cisneros then called Buddy and told him she wanted to talk about his son's ring and other things; both agreed to meet at a Burger King. Cisneros asked Buddy why Fischer broke up with Cristina, and Buddy said that was between his son and her. He said his son was old enough to make his own decisions, and that he would not get involved. Cisneros then asked him if he knew Fischer drank, and he responded that at his son's age it was not uncommon to drink. Cisneros then said she had seen Fischer drunk once before, but his father responded by saying if he had been drunk before, it was not in his presence. Sex never came up in the conversation. Buddy told Cisneros he would speak to his son about acting like a gentleman; Cisneros promised to return Fischer's ring. Buddy recalled the meeting was awkward but friendly.

Buddy returned home and told Fischer to apologize to Cristina if he had offended her, and to tell her that they should be friends. It is not known if he took his father's advice, but according to one of Fischer's friends, Cisneros continued to call him after her meeting with his father. One of his friends stated that Fischer said Cisneros had offered him US$500 to get back with her daughter, but he refused. Fischer grew angry at Cisneros's insistence that he rekindle his relationship with Cristina and eventually called her and told her to stop. (Note: According to his friends, Fischer admitted that he was frustrated with Cisneros and that he "told her off" after she kept calling him. He said he had never insulted an adult before.) Once Fischer's senior year started, he began to date a new girl, Marianela Caballero. He invited her to the homecoming dance, but they did not date for their first semester because Marianela did not want any commitments. However, by the start of their second semester, they began dating. Around that same time, Cristina also started dating another boy. Fischer told his friends that he was fine with Cristina dating other boys.

== Murder ==
On Wednesday, March 3, 1993, in Rancho Viejo, Texas, an affluent community just north of Brownsville, Fischer woke up early to get ready for school. Just before 7:00 am, he went to the garage and reversed his mother's car into the circular driveway at his home at 3 Cortez Avenue. He then walked toward the corner of the house and grabbed a garden hose to spray water on the car's windows, which were covered in dust. As he sprayed the car, someone came from behind and shot him twice at point-blank range with what would later be identified as a .38 Super pistol. (Note: Another source stated he was shot three times—once in his back and twice in the head. According to the autopsy, Fischer died almost instantly. The pathologist stated that Fischer might not have known what struck him.) One of the shots penetrated his chest and the other his brain. Fischer's mother looked out the window to see what had happened, thinking the noise came from one of the house's palm tree branches falling on the roof, or that the car had backfired. She did not see the car, and thought that perhaps her son had gone to a convenience store to pick up something, but Fischer's brother Eric told her he could see the car parked on the driveway.

She went to the garage and saw Fischer's body lying face up on the driveway. She told her daughter Kathy to call 911, and her father, Buddy, who lived a few minutes away. Buddy dressed and headed toward the house. He took a shortcut off Texas highways 77 and 83 to reach the house, and recalled going over 110 miles per hour (180 km/h) at some point, and brushing off a few cars along the way by gesturing with his left hand. Once he reached Rancho Viejo, he ignored the entrance and drove instead through a field of palm trees. As he drew closer to Fischer's house, he heard police sirens at a distance. When he arrived, he saw his son's body holding a garden hose. The running water had covered the entire roadway with Fischer's blood. Witnesses, including Eric, recall seeing a short-bearded Hispanic man in his mid-20s driving a white, four-door vehicle with Mexican license plates speeding away after the attack. Kathy then phoned one of Fischer's closest friends before school started and asked him if he knew if Fischer had any enemies. Fischer's friend could not think of anyone who disliked him, and only recalled that he and Fischer had been in an altercation with a group of boys at a football game.

The evening before Fischer's burial, over 600 people attended a Catholic service at St. Mary's Church in Brownsville. His parents decided to have an open casket to allow attendees to kneel and pray next to the coffin. The funeral took place in the same church. Many people were in attendance including Buddy and Corinne's acquaintances, and Fischer's high school classmates. His girlfriend Marianela Caballero and her mother attended both services. Cristina, his ex-girlfriend, was also at the services, but her mother was not present. Fischer was buried at the Mont Meta Memorial Park in San Benito, Texas. In the days after the funeral, several of Fischer's longtime friends and their parents gathered at Buddy's house for moral support. Fischer's family moved out of the house where he was killed, and went to live with Corinne's mother. The day of the murder, the Brownsville police offered a reward of US$5,000 to anyone who could assist in the arrest of any individual involved in the murder. A week later the reward was increased to US$20,000. Five months after the murder, Fischer's house was sold at a US$18,000 loss. (Note: Property records showed that Fischer's family bought the home on August 1, 1990, at US$108,000. On July 23, 1993, a couple bought the home for US$90,000. They told the press that the murder incident did not influence their decision to purchase the property.)

== Investigation ==
=== Initial evidence ===
Initially police believed that the murder was a drive-by shooting, but investigators discovered a tennis shoe print near the outdoor air conditioning unit, and a yellow business card next to Fischer's body. Though the business card was stained by blood from Corinne's hands after she tried to stop the bleeding, investigators were able to decipher the wording on the card. It was from the Collin County bail office in McKinney, Texas. A phone number was printed on the card and it had a handwritten area code, 214, from the Dallas area. Alex Perez, the former sheriff of Cameron County, who was appointed to lead the investigation, called the bail office and asked them to fax copies of bond applications made by Rio Grande Valley residents. The police theorized that the assailant had dropped the card after Fischer tried to defend himself. The bail office faxed the police several applications, and included one from Rudy Cuellar, a Dallas resident who often visited Mexico.

That morning, the police interrogated Fischer's girlfriend Marianela at the sheriff's office. They asked her if she had ever had cross words with Cristina. She said she had never talked to her, though she was confused why they asked about his ex-girlfriend. Cisneros was also interrogated, but the police found nothing unusual about her behavior, only that she was nervous, and had left her car keys inside her vehicle. Later that day, Cristina went to Buddy's house and offered her condolences. The police did not treat Cisneros's connection to Fischer any differently than the rest of the leads. They knew of Cisneros's calls, but they did not think it was suspicious enough to rule the murder a crime of passion. His stepfather initially thought that the murder was tied to a legal dispute over a contract worth thousands of dollars he had with a Chinese shrimp firm based in Arroyo City, Texas, just north of Brownsville that he had terminated. The police began to investigate this lead, and told Fischer's family that they were probably in danger. For about two weeks, they rarely left their house, and his parents considered sending Kathy and Eric to San Antonio, Texas, where their grandparents lived.

Given the high-profile nature of the case, the police received several tips from citizens. Police theorized that Fischer was killed by a drug gang that had mistaken him for someone else. They questioned a man alleged to be the intended victim, but the rumors turned out to be false. They also investigated an abandoned vehicle near the U.S.-Mexico border they suspected was used in the shooting. The car was reported stolen in South Padre Island, but detectives determined that it was not the vehicle the murderers used. The police continued to pursue the lead from the bail office in McKinney. They called the office and asked for recent bail applications from South Texas locations. The office gave them Cuellar's full name, his Dallas address, and faxed a copy of the application. Investigators noticed that the man's handwriting, specifically how the "4" was written, matched the handwriting on the yellow business card found at the murder scene.

Brownsville officers then headed to McKinney with a warrant revoking Cuellar's bond. He showed up later at the bail office, unsure why his application was cancelled. After police questioned him, he said he had given the yellow business card to a man at the La Quinta motel in Brownsville, and told him to call that number if he was ever arrested. Investigators knew that this motel in downtown Brownsville was a meeting place for low-level criminals. The sheriff's office began investigating the people who had stayed at the motel in previous months. Cuellar put the police in contact with Ramiro Moya, a San Antonio resident, who frequented Brownsville, and claimed to know details pertaining to the murder. Moya led the police to his half-brother Daniel "El Güero" Orlando Garza, a San Antonio painter who frequented Brownsville and Mexico.

=== Suspects and leads identified ===
Police interrogated Garza at a San Antonio motel in mid-March. Garza claimed to have a landscaping business in Mexico, though police suspected that he was a drug dealer. After further questioning, Garza incriminated himself and said he had made arrangements to have Fischer killed. He told the police he confessed because he was troubled by what he had done. He was not arrested immediately because investigators needed more information from him to continue with the case. He told investigators that it started when he visited a local fortune teller after he separated from his wife in 1992. The fortune teller, María Mercedes Martínez de Sánchez, consulted with Garza for several sessions in an attempt to repair the relationship he had with his wife. (Note: Martínez was a native of San Luis Potosí, Mexico, and a long-time Brownsville resident. Besides fortune telling and folk healing, she owned a second-hand clothing store, La Chuparosa, on 713 E. 11th St. in Brownsville.) Garza's son was born with muscular dystrophy and his wife was depressed, to the point where she wanted to kill herself and their son. Investigators said that Garza believed his wife's relatives had cast a spell on their marriage and he needed Martínez's help. They discovered that Martínez promised to help Garza if he agreed to help kill Fischer. Garza confirmed to the police Martínez was working with a "client" (Cisneros) who wanted Fischer, along with anyone who got in the way, dead. Cisneros visited her at least three times to consult with her after the break-up. During their first meeting, Cisneros wanted to know if Fischer felt anything for her daughter. Martínez read through her cards and told her he was no longer in love with Cristina. Cisneros paid US $5.00 for the card reading and left the shop upset with Martínez's answer.

During their second meeting, Cisneros asked Martínez to cast a spell on Fischer. Martínez said she was unable to do that, and Cisneros grew angry and left the store. A few days later, Cisneros called Martínez and asked her to pray for Fischer to get back together with Cristina. Cisneros returned for a third visit to Martínez's shop in October 1992, and asked her if she knew anyone willing to beat up Fischer. By winter, she changed her request and asked to have Fischer killed, (Note: Garza was also initially told by Martínez that Cisneros wanted Fischer beaten up. By January or February 1993, Martínez told Garza that Cisneros had changed her request and now wanted him dead.) offering US$3,000 to the person who would do it. According to Martínez, Cisneros told her that Fischer had raped Cristina and was telling his classmates at St. Joe that he had sex with her. (Note: According to Marie Brenner, a former writer for The New Yorker, and cousin of Fischer's father, in Mexican folklore, some people believed that killing the man who took a woman's virginity could restore her virtue.) However, Cristina said she never had sex with him. Although Garza assured Martínez that he would find someone to carry out the job, he kept calling and visiting her to discuss his marriage problems. Under pressure from Cisneros, Martínez would often interrupt the sessions with Garza to remind him of the plan. Garza lied to Martínez on several occasions telling her he had someone lined up to kill Fischer. Cisneros contacted Martínez in November to ask her why the job had not been done. Martínez responded that she did not know when the murder would be carried out. Garza eventually divorced his wife on January 4, 1993, and kept calling Martínez to tell her his personal problems had not been fixed. On January 9, he traveled to Brownsville from San Antonio to talk about the divorce, and Martínez reminded him that a client of hers wanted Fischer dead. She told him again that if he facilitated Fischer's murder, Garza's personal problems would be solved.

Martínez contacted Garza, who knew two hitmen from Matamoros who could carry out the job. Cisneros then gave Martínez a photo of Fischer, who passed it on to Garza. Garza contacted Israel Olivarez Cepeda and Heriberto "Eddie" Puentes Pizaña to carry out the murder. (Note: Olivarez's last name was sometimes spelled as Olivares. He was also known by his aliases Israel Bazaldúa Zepeda, Rafael Mata Soto, El Cabezón, and Chutaro.) Garza had met them in Brownsville at Olivarez' uncle's house. During the last week of January, Garza met them again at a restaurant in Grand Prairie, Texas while he was working with Cuellar and Moya. Garza told Olivarez that there was a woman in Brownsville willing to pay someone to kill Fischer. Olivarez said he was interested in the job and stayed in contact with Garza. (Note: According to Garza, he told Olivarez about the plot to kill Fischer after hearing him confess he had killed a man in Brownsville and dumped his body in the Rio Grande. "He [Olivarez] acted like it was no big deal," Garza told the police.) Olivarez and Puentes Pizaña were part of a cross-border drug trafficking and car theft ring that stretched from Mexico to Chicago. This organization was headed by Cuellar, the same man whose bond application was investigated by the Brownsville police after the business card was discovered at Fischer's house. Garza met the two again in Dallas on February 14 to describe the murder plans. They were given Fischer's photo, a map with the address, and promised that they would do as they had been told on their next trip to Brownsville. (Note: Another source says that Garza met with the two in Brownsville in the last week of February 1993 to give them Fischer's photo and address.) On March 2, the night before the murder, Garza was traveling from San Fernando, Tamaulipas, Mexico, to San Antonio and bumped into the two at a motel in Brownsville. (Note: Another source stated that Garza registered at the motel on March 1 and left on March 11. The hitmen registered for a two-person room on March 2 and left on March 4, 1993.) Olivarez asserted that he was ready to carry out the plan.

=== Hours before and after murder ===
According to U.S. border surveillance, a white Mercury Grand Marquis with Mexican license plates 821-THE7 crossed at Brownsville border entry at 6:39 pm. CT on March 2. This car had crossed to Brownsville from Matamoros eighteen times between August 1992 and March 1993. When police went to the motel to check the register, they discovered that at 8:26 pm. CT that evening, Puentes Pizaña and Ramón Palomares, another hitman of the Cuellar organization, checked in with the receptionist. She registered the car in her notebook as a white Grand Marquis, but it was unclear if she wrote 821-WEX or 821-THE7 as the license plate number. (Note: Another source stated that Puentes Pizaña was the one who wrote his plate number in the registry. Investigators were unsure why they would sign the register if they were in Brownsville to commit murder.) Other evidence showed that several calls were made from Puentes Pizaña's and Garza's rooms to an identical Dallas number on the day of the murder. The police were never able to connect the number with the investigation, or identify the Dallas contact. Other evidence showed that Garza, along with Cuellar and Moya, visited a gun shop in Dallas to purchase a .38 Super pistol. After Fischer was killed, Garza said that the gun was stolen from his house in San Antonio after someone broke into it. The weapon was never recovered.

Between 7:00 a.m. and 8:00 am. CT on March 3, the morning Fischer was killed, Olivarez confirmed with Garza at the motel that the murder was successful. Garza then went to Martínez's shop to tell her the teenager was dead. She told Garza that she would not give him the money unless there was solid proof that Fischer was dead. Garza then talked with Olivarez and Puentes Pizaña at the motel room. A few hours after the murder, Martínez phoned Cisneros and told her that the job had been carried out. Cisneros arrived at her store minutes later and left a sealed envelope with the money. Cisneros then went to St. Joe and picked up her daughter from school. Later that evening, Garza and Puentes Pizaña met with Martínez and picked up the envelope. (Note: Another source mentions that Garza picked up the money at noon after he met Martínez at her shop, and confirmed Fischer's murder through the news broadcast on TV.) They headed back to the motel and Garza handed over the envelope to Olivarez. Garza claims that the hitmen received $3,500, though he stated he never counted the money. Martínez said she did and that it was $3,000. Investigators believe it could have been as much as $5,000. Garza was then picked up by his nephew from Matamoros and taken to the Harlingen airport, where he flew back to San Antonio. On his way to the airport, he passed through Rancho Viejo and recalled seeing police cars and a house cordoned off with yellow tape.

== Arrests ==
After Garza confessed to police in a written statement on March 31, 1993, he was not arrested immediately because he agreed to cooperate with them in their efforts to apprehend Martínez. Garza reached out to Martínez and told her that the assassins wanted more money. He met with her three times in April 1993 wearing a wire, and had Martínez agree to contact Cisneros to give Garza the money. Police arrested Martínez on April 6 and agreed to work with them to incriminate Cisneros. The next morning, she scheduled a meeting with Cisneros and told her that the assassins requested more money, and she needed to pay. They rode around Brownsville and Cisneros's voice was recorded. The police kept close to the car to stay within the transmitter's signal range. Only portions of the conversation were recorded because the police were unable to remain within range all the time. While in the car, Cisneros gave Martínez an envelope with US$500. Cisneros then asked Martínez if there was any evidence that she had orchestrated the murder. Cisneros mentioned Garza and a man known as "El Cortado," though investigators had no idea who he was. In the recorded conversation, there was no incriminating evidence against the gunmen, since there was no evidence that Cisneros employed them, or that the assassins murdered Fischer. The meeting concluded when police pulled the vehicle over and arrested Cisneros. She told a police officer that she owed Martínez some money, which Martínez later admitted was not the case.

Cisneros and Martínez were arrested and charged with capital murder, which in Texas is punishable with a life sentence or death by lethal injection. Cisneros was taken to the Cameron County jail. On her way there, reporters asked if she was responsible for Fischer's murder, and she shook her head. Cisneros's husband also refused to comment. The police denied her bail, but her attorney said that she was a respected member of the Brownsville community and deserved bail. Cisneros's attorney told the press that the arrest was a mistake, and that he was confident the police had no solid evidence against her. Police responded by saying they were content with her arrest, but still needed to go after other people involved in the murder plot. Martínez' family also said they were shocked by the arrest, saying they hoped it was a mistake, and that they did not know the Fischers or Cisneros. On April 13, Cisneros was released from prison on a $300,000 bond, refusing to comment as she left. According to court documents, Cisneros did not go before a judge to obtain a bond. Her attorney reached an agreement with the Cameron County Court District after her bond was denied the week before. Martínez remained in prison, and her bond was set at the same amount the next day. Her lawyer stated that she deserved a bond as well because she was a senior citizen and had a clean criminal record.

On June 8, 1993, Garza was arrested at the Cameron County office in Harlingen having surrendered after an arrest warrant was issued. (Note: According to Garza's account, he was misled by the police. Garza was reportedly in Mexico visiting his family when he found out that the Brownsville police wanted to talk to him in person. He agreed to return to the U.S., but claimed to have an understanding with police that he would cooperate in exchange for a shorter sentence. His family told him not to go see the police since they believed he was going to be arrested, which turned out to be the case.) He was charged with capital murder and held at a county prison with a US$500,000 bond. Garza refused to comment on the arrest, and officers stated that they could not release details of his involvement other than that they had evidence he was involved in Fischer's murder. Arrest warrants were issued for Olivarez and Puentes Pizaña the day before. They were believed to be in Mexico, and police said they were working with Mexican officials to arrest the two men. On July 21, 1993, Mexican State Judicial Police arrested Olivarez, and his brother Alonso Bazaldúa Cepeda, in Matamoros on a December 1992 murder charge, and for the unauthorized use of a vehicle. However, both men were released at around 3:00 a.m. the next day after Olivarez showed the police a writ of amparo (similar to a writ of habeas corpus), which protected his constitutional civil rights. Following their release, the Brownsville police said there were reports that the two suspects were seen in Matamoros, and in Monterrey, Nuevo León, and that next time they tried to cross the international bridge, U.S. border agents would arrest them. Police records show that Olivarez was once arrested in Brownsville on September 12, 1992, for possession of a criminal instrument, but was released on bond the following day. He wrote on his bond application that he lived in Brownsville, (Note: According to police reports, Olivarez listed his address as 104 Dew St., in southern Brownsville. The police had tips that he frequented that neighborhood. However, the man living at this address stated on May 7, 1994, that Olivarez did not live there and that he had left for Mexico.) though this information was false.

On February 13, 1994, State Judicial Police arrested Puentes Pizaña in Reynosa, Tamaulipas, on a car theft charge. In an interview the following day, he said he was not guilty of Fischer's murder, and claimed he was at his mother's house in Matamoros when the murder occurred. He insisted that neither he nor Olivarez were gun owners or users. U.S. officials noted that it was unlikely for Mexico to extradite Puentes Pizaña since the extradition treaty between both countries did not cover Mexican nationals, and because Texas has the death penalty, which is outlawed in Mexico. Reynosa officials stated that Puentes Pizaña would have to face charges in Mexico before an extradition could be considered. Car theft sentences ranged from three to ten years in prison. Puentes Pizaña, on the other hand, argued that facing trial in the U.S. would not guarantee a fair trial. South Texas officials stated that there was a possibility for Puentes Pizaña to be tried in Mexico for Fischer's murder if an agreement was made between Texan and Tamaulipas state officials, though they said that trying him in the U.S. was unlikely. (Note: Ultimately, the decision to extradite him depended on the President of Mexico. However, the decision was viewed as highly improbable because Mexico had never extradited a criminal to the U.S. at that time. There was also distrust with U.S. prosecutors after a Guadalajara doctor accused of murder was kidnapped by U.S. federal agents to face trial in the U.S. in 1990.) Among the possible guarantees discussed for a possible extradition was dropping Puentes Pizaña's capital murder charge altogether because it qualified him for the death penalty. Another alternative discussed was having U.S. authorities promise Mexican prosecutors that Puentes Pizaña would not face the death penalty. Once in the U.S., Puentes Pizaña's charges cannot be upgraded, per the 1980 extradition treaty between both countries.

On May 23, 1994, Mexican State Judicial Police arrested Olivarez again in Matamoros for possessing two stolen vehicles. He was interviewed by Mexican authorities and stated that he was not guilty of Fischer's murder. He admitted to having stolen cars since he was young, and stated that Garza was trying to put the blame on him to protect himself from prosecution. Olivarez justified himself by saying that he had never been arrested with a gun. He admitted going to Dallas in 1992, but stated that he only knew Garza by name. He said he was a self-employed auto mechanic who supported his wife, mother, and uncle. Mexican officials said that Olivarez's auto theft ring extended all the way to Monterrey, as well as in Río Bravo, Valle Hermoso, and Matamoros, Tamaulipas. There was an arrest warrant for him issued by a state judge in Reynosa for being connected to about 50 car thefts. Brownsville investigators went to Mexico to see if they could talk to Olivarez, and began extradition proceedings to bring him to a Texan court.

== Legal charges and hearings ==
A state grand jury indicted Cisneros, Martínez, Garza, Olivarez, and Puentes Pizaña on July 28, 1993. Defense attorneys said they wanted to move the trial out of Cameron County because the case had attracted a lot of media attention in the local area. Martínez' defense attorney said he wanted to file a motion to change the venue, and have his client tried separately from the other accused. He also said that he would try to suppress a statement made by Martínez after she was arrested in April. On August 12, in a packed courtroom at the 357th State District Court house in Brownsville, Cisneros and Martínez pleaded not guilty to the murder charges. Garza also entered a not-guilty plea, and stood with the accused during the court session. The judge agreed to remove La Curandera (Healer-Fortune Teller) from Martínez' name on the indictment after the defense complained that the alias was a media creation. The judge set the hearing date for pre-trial motions for October 7, and the trial for November 8. On September 20, defense attorneys for Martínez and Garza filed motions to suppress statements their clients had made since March. Martínez's attorney said she did not understand her right to have a lawyer because she is not fluent in English, and that her arrest was unlawful. The defense asked the judge to discard the video and wire tap recordings because they claimed that their client was involuntarily coerced to make statements that incriminated her, and thus violated the Miranda warnings. Martínez' defense requested a court-appointed translator, the elimination of the indictment, and a severance to have their client tried separately. In addition, Garza's defense said that their client's constitutional rights were violated when he made his statements. They also said that Garza's encounter with Martínez after Fischer's murder was recorded without his knowledge.

On October 27, the defense attorneys again said that they wanted to move the venue for the trial outside Cameron County because of all the publicity the case had received. They claimed it was impossible to select an impartial jury in Brownsville because of the amount of information the press had released against the defendants. The judge said he would announce his decision on November 2. On the same day, a grand jury reindicted Cisneros and Martínez on capital murder. Prosecutors had presented the evidence to a second grand jury and issued a revised indictment. A clear distinction between the first and second indictment was the change of the word "caused" to "committed". Because a new indictment was issued, Cisneros, Martínez, and Garza pleaded not-guilty for a second time, forcing the court proceedings to be pushed back from their original dates. A pretrial hearing scheduled for November 2 was delayed. At least 42 motions were filed by the defendants when the first indictment was made, and the second indictment meant that they had to refile all the motions by November 12.

On November 23, Cisneros's request for a change of venue was denied by the court. The prosecution stated that the pool of possible jurors included people from other parts of Cameron County and not just from Brownsville, where most of the county's population resided, and where the murder occurred. They stated it was unlikely that these potential jurors had read the articles from the Houston Chronicle, The Dallas Morning News, or The New Yorker magazine, which the defense provided earlier as evidence that Cisneros was depicted negatively. The trial was pushed ahead to January 31, 1994. The day of the trial, Martínez admitted that she conspired to kill Fischer and agreed to testify against Cisneros and Garza. By entering a plea bargain, Martínez was seeking to be sentenced for a conspiracy charge and to have the capital murder charges dropped. The judge stated that he was not bound by the plea bargain agreement, but clarified that she had the right to drop her guilty plea if she so decided.

Jury selection began on February 4. Defense attorneys questioned the first potential jury group of 38 people. They chose two jurors on the first day of the selection hearing for Cisneros's and Garza's trial. Martínez was no longer part of the proceedings since she pleaded guilty to conspiracy to murder on February 1, and agreed to testify for the prosecution against Cisneros and Garza. According to state law, a defendant cannot be sentenced based on the statement of an alleged accomplice. While interviewing the rest of the potential jurors, each defense attorney struck two potential jurors as did the state. Two others were disqualified, but this did not affect the total number of strikes allowed. Each defendant was allowed eight strikes, and the prosecution sixteen for the two defendants. On February 7, two more jurors were selected, bringing the total to four of the twelve jurors required, plus two alternate jurors. The judge said he was going to analyze whether he should drop Martínez' capital murder charge since she had pleaded guilty to conspiracy the week before. On February 11, the defense attorneys were halfway through the jury selection after selecting a total of seven. On February 16, nine jurors had been selected, but the total number of strikes was reduced after 25 jurors were struck because they had pre-conceived opinions of the defendants. The defense had used 10 strikes between them and had only six left. The prosecution, on the other hand, had eight strikes left. By February 23, eleven jurors had been selected. Only two open spots were available for jurors, one being an alternate.

== Testimony and evidence ==
Since the trial had received national attention, Brownsville officials were expecting a large crowd of spectators and reporters in the courtroom. In order to accommodate them, the trial was moved from the 357th State District Court to the 197th State District courtroom. On February 25, 1994, the jury examined the evidence from the bullet remains, the motel records, and photos of Fischer's corpse. Joey Fischer's brother Eric took the stand and described what he saw and heard the morning his brother was killed. He said when he heard the two gunshots, he looked through the window and saw a white car driving away. Fischer's sister Kathy told the jury that she and Cristina had once had a two-hour telephone conversation, and that Cristina had said that she wanted to "hurt" Fischer. Their school counselor stated that Cristina agreed she said this but claimed she did not mean it once she learned about Fischer's death. Cristina told the jury that she did not remember making such statements to Kathy and the counselor.

A member of the Cuellar organization, Victor Moreno, testified in court and helped investigators connect the murder to members of the criminal group. He stated that Olivarez, Puentes Pizaña, and Palomares worked for Cuellar and were behind the murder. He also said he spoke with Garza about "a murder" in Brownsville, and claimed to have been with Cuellar when Palomares called him to tell him about the murder of "a boy" in Brownsville. Moreno allegedly gave money to Garza to buy the gun in Dallas on Cuellar's behalf. After the purchase, Moreno gave the gun to Cuellar, who then reportedly gave it to the assassins. The defense stated that even if, for argument's sake, Moreno's testimony was true it was inadmissible because he was not involved in the murder. However, the court concluded that he was integral to the process that led to Fischer's murder, and admitted his testimony citing a co-conspirator hearsay exception.

On February 28, Garza's half-brother Moya testified against him and said Garza admitted he had received US$3,000 for Fischer's murder while he was in Brownsville. Garza's defense tried to discredit Moya's statements by saying he was facing drug offenses in Dallas, and was cooperating with prosecutors by testifying against Garza to receive a reduced sentence. Moya denied such arrangements were in place. He said the gun used at the murder scene was bought in Dallas while he was there, and he remembered seeing it in Garza's home in San Antonio. Records from the gun shop in Dallas showed Garza bought the same type of gun on February 1, 1993. In addition, a Drug Enforcement Administration (DEA) investigator testified he helped record the suspect's conversations, while a Federal Bureau of Investigation (FBI) technician helped improve the clarity of the tapes. The defense attorneys brought in experts to discredit the recordings, and to prove they had been tampered with.

On March 1, defense attorneys questioned evidence brought by the prosecution. They pointed out that the police had no written reports of the investigation, and had failed to record the serial numbers and mark the US$100 bills used as evidence when Martínez received the cash from Cisneros immediately before her arrest. In addition, a private forensic investigator hired by the defense stated that he could not prove that the recordings were authentic. The private investigator later mentioned in an interview that the defense had paid US$18,000 to analyze the tapes, though she said that this payment did not influence her study of the recordings. The defense said the searches police conducted did not produce any evidence to implicate Cisneros in the murder, and that Garza was not arrested for over a month after he confessed his involvement in it. The police defended their actions and said that Garza was initially a witness when investigators met with him and Moya in March 1993 at a motel in San Antonio to discuss the murder. Investigators said he then traveled with them to Brownsville to give an official statement which he signed. He then stayed at a hotel in Brownsville that was arranged and paid for by Brownsville investigators, while the police prepared to record his encounter with Martínez. After incriminating Martínez, Garza was allowed to go to Mexico. Martínez and Cisneros were arrested several weeks after Garza's statement, but he was not arrested until two months later. The police stated that they made no promises to Garza to obtain his cooperation.

On March 3, the jurors listened to the voice recordings having been provided with a transcript. The transcript had "inaudible" written on some of the excerpts because the conversations during Garza's meeting with Martínez, and during Martínez' meeting with Cisneros, were unclear. On the first recording, Garza met with Martínez under the pretext that the gunmen were requesting more money, and that the police instructed Garza to tell Martínez that Cisneros needed to pay an extra US$500. On the recordings, Martínez told Garza that she had no money and that Cisneros was out of town. Garza then told Martínez that the assassins were difficult to contact and he worried that if the payments were not made, they could get angry. Martínez then asked Garza what the assassins did with the car they used, and if they had worn gloves when they shot Fischer. After two more recordings between the pair, the Brownsville police arrested Martínez and had her meet with Cisneros. Early in the recording made with Cisneros, though unclear in some parts, she was recorded handing over something to Martínez and saying "five," referring to the US$500 the police confiscated from her during the arrest. She was also recorded asking Martínez if there was any proof that she had been involved in the murder. The jury heard Cisneros's recording asking Martínez the following phrase: "There isn't, isn't any evidence that I did anything?"

On March 5, Martínez testified against Cisneros and told the jury that she ordered Fischer's murder. Martínez said that Cisneros told her to keep the plan a secret and that she wanted him "good and dead". Speaking in Spanish through an interpreter, Martínez leaned forward in her seat and pointed at Cisneros, saying she told her exactly that. Defense attorneys tried to discredit Martínez' testimony and show the jury that she was a con-woman. They presented letters from several of her former clients who had paid around US$600 for love potions. One woman from San Antonio said that Martínez consulted her after she began having problems with her boyfriend and did not see positive results. Martínez denied knowing who the writers were, but changed her mind when the defense read the letters to her and the jury. She admitted that she used herbs, oils, and holy water in her sessions, and that she kept a human skull in her shop. She did not call herself a curandera (fortune teller) because she did not study to earn the title. Martínez was then asked to read her cards for one of the attorneys in the courtroom to show the jury how she worked.

== Court decision and sentences ==
After three weeks of jury selection, and eight trial days, the defense made their closing statements on March 7 in about three hours. They presented three witnesses and then rested their case. Fischer's mother took the stand and gave her final testimony, and her version of the story. The judge told prosecutors that they had to choose to charge the defendants with capital murder or conspiracy to commit murder. The prosecution decided on the capital murder charge, and sought the death penalty for both Cisneros and Garza. The following day, the jury convicted Cisneros and Garza of capital murder for arranging Fischer's death. Neither of them showed any emotion when the verdict was given. Cisneros then removed her jewelry and was taken to the Cameron County jail with Garza. The jurors met the following day to discuss the punishment phase of the trial.

On March 9, the judge sentenced Cisneros and Garza to life in prison after the jury decided that neither of them posed a threat to society, and thus did not deserve the death penalty. This sentence included the possibility for parole after they complete 35 mandatory years behind bars. The head juror said the tapes were the strongest evidence against them, along with Martínez' testimony. Fischer's parents said they were pleased with the decision, and that justice was finally served, but said their son's absence would leave a void for the rest of their lives. The prosecution intended to have Cisneros sentenced to death arguing that her actions were premeditated. Garza's closing words centered around him being told by Martínez that Cisneros wanted Fischer hurt, and that he would not have knowingly participated in a murder. Both defense attorneys said they would appeal the verdict. Cisneros's attorney in particular said the judge's denial of a separate trial for his client was the reason for his early appeal. The defense said that trials where two defendants implicate each other are often severed. The judge refused to sever them because Cisneros's statement did not mention Garza. The defense also said they would appeal the verdict because they believed that the voice recordings were tampered with and unauthenticated. A judge formalized the jury's decision and sentenced Cisneros and Garza to life in prison on April 18.

On March 25, Martínez was sentenced to 20 years in prison for conspiracy to commit murder. The judge recognized that although she was of advanced age, and might not leave prison alive before her sentence was completed, in his judgment the punishment was appropriate. She was given the maximum sentence; the shortest sentence was two years. Martínez' lawyer said that if her client had not pleaded guilty and cooperated with court officials, her sentence would probably have been the same as Cisneros's and Garza's. He also said that she would be eligible for parole in 18 to 24 months because the murder weapon was never found. If the murder weapon had been found, Texas law required all individuals convicted in a murder case to serve at least a fourth of their sentence before being eligible for parole. Both Cisneros and Martínez were sent to the all-female state prison Gatesville Unit and kept in separate cells, while Garza was confined in a Cameron County prison.

On July 13, 1995, Cameron County officials and state authorities traveled to Mexico City to ask Mexican officials to prosecute Puentes Pizaña and Olivarez for Fischer's murder. Thousands of documents were translated from English to Spanish and handed over to Mexico's attorney general for review. On July 15, Mexican officials agreed to prosecute both of them for the murder in an international prosecution court in Mexico City. Texas prosecutors asked the Mexican government to use Article 4 of the Mexican Federal Penal Code, a little-used provision that permits Mexican citizens to be prosecuted in Mexico for crimes they committed outside the country. In order for the provision to take effect, it required the accused to be in Mexican territory; not to have faced justice in the country where the crime was committed; and that the crime was not only illegal in the country where it was committed, but also in Mexico. Murder in Mexico carries a maximum sentence of 50 years in prison, though it is common for people to be released after 15 to 25 years for good behavior. The Cameron County office said they would use a federal prosecutor from Tamaulipas as the judge. The two accused would be issued an arrest warrant and asked to appear in court where a federal judge would review their case and determine the punishment in a few months. When Puentes Pizaña heard the news, he was surprised and angered by the decision. He maintained his innocence saying he was only a car thief. Olivarez was in custody in a Matamoros prison. (Note: Another source two months before inadvertently stated that Olivarez was no longer in custody.) On September 20, a Mexican federal judge agreed to prosecute Puentes Pizaña and Olivarez for the murder.

== Cisneros's conviction overturned ==
On January 25, 1996, Cisneros's conviction was overturned by the Court of Appeals for the 13th District of Texas in Edinburgh, Texas. In court, the judge instructed the jury that unless there was evidence showing that Cisneros employed the assassins, or that there was evidence that Puentes Pizaña and Olivarez killed Fischer, she could not be convicted of capital murder. The jury had no evidence that Cisneros hired the assassins since her only contact was through Martínez. The jury analyzed the circumstantial evidence that linked Puentes Pizaña or Olivarez to the murder. They knew the pair registered at the motel the night before the murder, and left the motel a few hours after Fischer was killed. They also heard they drove a car with a similar description as the one seen at the crime scene, and made several phone calls to the same Dallas number as Garza after the killing, and that Garza said he paid the assassins at a motel. This evidence cast suspicion on the two alleged hit-men, but was not enough to prove beyond a reasonable doubt that Puentes Pizaña or Olivarez were behind Fischer's murder. The court also recognized that even if Puentes Pizaña or Olivarez were found guilty of the murder, there was not enough evidence to show that Cisneros employed the two or was ever in contact with them. The jury recognized there was evidence that she gave money to Martínez, who in turn gave it to Garza, but that meant there were several parties at fault. In order for the jury to find Cisneros responsible for the actions of another party, the judge needed to charge the jury on the Texas law of parties that she was "acting a party to the offense".

Prosecutors agreed that Cisneros was guilty under the law of parties — that she was guilty of the crime of murder even though she did not commit the crime directly. However, prosecutors failed to word her charge appropriately, suggesting that Cisneros "directly" hired Puentes Pizaña and Olivarez to murder Fischer instead of working through intermediaries. On February 14, a state appeals court in Corpus Christi ordered Cisneros released on a US$50,000 bond, about one-sixth of the original bond posted for her trial. The order stated that the prosecution did not agree to the bail, but the document stated they had failed to file the appropriate paperwork within the mandatory ten days. On February 22, a judge ordered her released from prison. She was unavailable for comment, and it was not known if she returned to Brownsville. Fischer's family denounced the ruling and said the appeals court "seemed to have lost sight" that their son was killed. Brownsville prosecutors said even if there was not enough evidence to convict Cisneros for capital murder, she could still be convicted of ordinary murder, since the appeal was approved because there was no direct evidence linking Cisneros with a murder-for-hire charge. The reversal was upheld by the Texas Court of Criminal Appeals in November 1996.

== Re-arrest ==
=== New charges and hearings ===
After two years, Cisneros was re-arrested on February 25, 1998, and held without bond. According to county jail records, she was arrested for the same murder-for-hire charges as the first time. The FBI did not elaborate initially on the charges, but stated she was indicted by a federal grand jury for using interstate or foreign commerce facilities to orchestrate the murder. The indictment's hearing was held two weeks before the statute of limitations ran out. Cameron County officials said that charging Cisneros again was not double jeopardy, which protects individuals from being charged for the same crime more than once, because she was charged federally. They argued the new indictment included new charges not discussed in the previous trial, and that there are some areas that allow for concurrent jurisdiction that can lead to someone being charged for separate crimes under the same circumstances. If convicted again, Cisneros was facing another life in prison sentence and a US$250,000 fine. Her defense stated they would plead not guilty and ask for a jury trial. The prosecution said that Martínez agreed to serve as their primary witness again. The defense criticized the new indictment stating it was vague and did not include new information.

On March 2, the defense argued in court that Cisneros should be set free on bond during the trial because she did not pose a flight risk as demonstrated by her actions during the first trial. The defense stated that she never failed to appear in court during the 1994 trial even though she was facing a possible death penalty. In addition, they said she was a long-time resident of Brownsville and had no previous criminal history. Though Cisneros was aware of the FBI investigation, and the possibility of a new indictment against her, she had not fled, thus justifying her bond. On March 9, Cisneros was released from jail on a US$300,000 bond. The court ruled for the defense after deciding that she would not attempt to flee before the trial. Court officials imposed certain restrictions on her freedom, however. They asked her to hand over her U.S. passport and to limit her travel to the Brownsville and McAllen, Texas judicial districts. Her husband was also required to sign a document that made him a third-party custodian.

On April 1, the defense asked for the new trial to be moved outside Brownsville, claiming their client had received unfair treatment in the media and there was no chance for her to have a fair trial and an unbiased jury. The request included large numbers of magazines and newspaper articles published since 1993. It did not cite any specific passages where the alleged media bias was demonstrated. The defense also filed a motion to throw out the new indictment on the grounds that it was double jeopardy. On April 27, the judge decided to postpone his decision about where to hold the trial. He also rejected the defense motion stating that the new indictment was a case of double jeopardy. The defense argued that the prosecution had illegally used Brownsville and Houston grand juries to work on the case, but the judge countered that claim saying only the Houston grand jury had handled the case. On May 4, the trial was moved from Brownsville to Houston, Texas, because of the earlier extensive media coverage.

=== New trial and sentence ===
In an opening statement for the trial on May 4, Cisneros's defense denied her client's participation in the murder, and called Martínez a liar. They stated that Martínez and Garza orchestrated the murder without Cisneros' involvement. The prosecution told the jury that Cisneros orchestrated the murder. Fischer's mother took the stand and repeated her versions of the story and of the two loud noises she heard before finding her son's corpse covered with blood on the driveway. In addition to her, other witnesses took the stand to tell the jury their stories, including his stepfather and a gardener, who saw a vehicle with Mexican license plates leaving the house when Fischer was shot dead. Martínez testified in court again that Cisneros agreed to pay her to find someone to murder Fischer after Martínez told her that he was not in love with her daughter. Investigators who worked on the case also testified in court and stated that Martínez cooperated with them to set up a meeting with Cisneros after she assisted her in finding someone to have Fischer killed. The prosecution stated they had audio tapes of Martínez's meeting with Cisneros, but they were asked to hold off on presenting the evidence because the defense stated the tapes were tampered with. The recordings were admitted to court on May 8 and presented to the jury through translated transcripts.

The prosecution brought forward bank statements that showed that Cisneros withdrew US$5,000 from a US$100,000 family safety deposit box on July 7, 1992, and March 3, 1993, the morning Fischer was killed. (Note: Another source stated that it was unclear if the withdrawal was made on March 2 or 3 since it was difficult to determine the employee's handwriting.) The defense stated that there was nothing illegal about visiting the safety deposit box or making the withdrawal. They stated that the US$5,000 was for a family trip to Mexico. The prosecution suggested that the money was to pay off the murderers, but they were unable to provide evidence linking the two actions. On May 11, the defense introduced two witnesses to rest their case after six days of prosecution arguments. Most of the testimonies from the prosecution that day were done by Garza, who stated that Martínez never mentioned Cisneros' name as the person she was working with to have Fischer killed. Garza stated that he consulted Martínez on his marriage, but that she would interrupt to ask him if he had found anyone who was willing to carry out her client's request and hurt Fischer. Garza claimed that he had at least four calls from phone booths in San Fernando and Matamoros, two Mexican cities. The defense stated that Garza told the FBI that he made collect calls, but Garza said they were mistaken. He said that making collect calls from Mexico was difficult, though he did not discard the possibility of having made one to Martínez. The prosecution did not enter evidence showing that Garza made calls from Mexico to the U.S., and one of the defense witnesses showed that Martínez's phone bill did not have any collect calls from Matamoros. The defense stated that Garza made the claim of the phone calls from Mexico to get a reduced sentence, while Garza responded that he was testifying to make sure everyone involved in the murder gets punished. The defense responded by showing the jury letters from Garza's jail stating that he was willing to cooperate with the FBI in the trial for a reduced sentence. Garza responded by saying that those letters were written by one of his English-literate inmates on his behalf. The other defense witness was a restaurateur who saw Cisneros a few hours after the murder and recalled seeing her behaving normally.

The federal jury convicted Cisneros of the murder on May 12 after three hours of deliberation. The prosecution introduced witnesses, including the motel manager and those at the crime scene, who stated that they saw a white car driven by the suspected assassins coming from Mexico the day before the shooting. The defense told the jurors that there was not enough evidence to uphold the conviction under federal requirements of reasonable doubt. The government concluded that it met the burden of proof for interstate or foreign commerce charges in two ways: through Garza's phone calls from Mexico, and through the matching license plates of the Mexican car that crossed into the U.S. and registered at the motel, which matched the description of the vehicle seen at the murder scene. In order to find Cisneros guilty, they were not required to prove that she intended to use interstate or foreign commerce, or even that she knew it would be used. They were required to prove that someone involved in Fischer's murder used interstate or foreign commerce or caused another person to use it. On July 27, the jury rendered their final verdict and sentenced Cisneros to life in prison. Two years later, the United States Attorney Office recognized two local police officers and three FBI agents for assisting in her prosecution.

== Further appeals and aftermath ==
On February 24, 2000, the United States Court of Appeals for the Fifth Circuit (5th Circuit), acting sua sponte (on their own accord), decided to rehear Cisneros' sentence en banc (before the entire court). After reviewing the case, they reaffirmed the conviction on January 4, 2001. A petition for a rehearing was denied by the court on February 2, 2001. Her defense filed a writ of certiorari, seeking a judicial court review, on April 4, 2001. On June 19, 2001, Cisneros' defense filed a petition with the U.S. Supreme Court to review her conviction and have it overturned. They claimed that the U.S. federal government did not have jurisdiction over her case because there was no evidence of foreign commerce to invoke federal jurisdiction. Cisneros' attorney stated that the evidence brought forward from the prosecution showed that the murder arrangements were made in Texas, and that the murderers traveled from Dallas to Brownsville—not Mexico—before the murder. Since the U.S. Supreme Court only reviews a few hundred cases out of the thousands of requests it receives each year, this appeal was Cisneros' last attempt to have her conviction overturned. The 5th Circuit refused to consider the appeal on October 3. The U.S. Supreme Court denied her request for an appeal a second time on November 10, 2008, bringing the case to full closure.

According to the Federal Bureau of Prisons, Cisneros was jailed in the Federal Correctional Institution in Tallahassee, Florida. She is now at the Federal Medical Center, Carswell with BOP#77877-079. Years after her imprisonment, she maintained that she did not order Fischer's murder. Martínez, a non-US citizen subject to deportation as a result of her conviction, was released from prison in April 2001 and later died in Matamoros. Garza, who was sentenced to life in prison, turned to religion and became a devout Catholic. In a letter written to the press in 2013, he thanked God for saving his life after two ruptured stomach ulcers, and a heart attack that nearly killed him in 2012. He was imprisoned at the age of 42 and will not be eligible for parole until June 2028 (when he will be 78 years old). He has spent time in several Texas prisons, including the Louis C. Powledge Unit, the Terrell Unit, and the Eastham Unit.

Inside the gymnasium of Fischer's former school is a gold plaque that reads:

May the serenity of the peaceful oceans and the warmth of the deep blue skies embrace you in the realms of heaven. May you light heavenly skies with love and enthusiasm as you lit ours for eighteen years. May the angels welcome you with open arms and joyous voices. We love you, Joey. – Class of 1993 & Class of 1994

== Adaptation ==
The murder of Joey Fischer served as the inspiration for the Lifetime film Nobody Dumps My Daughter that was part of its "Ripped From the Headlines" feature films starring Ana Ortiz as Mary (who was based on Dora Cisneros), Jasmine Vegas as Theresa (who was based on Christina Cisneros), Sheila E. as Anna (who was based on María Mercedes Martínez), and Aiden Howard as Jimmy Simpson (who was based on Joey Fischer).

== Sources ==
=== Bibliography ===
- Hendrickson, Brett (2014). Border Medicine: A Transcultural History of Mexican American Curanderismo. NYU Press. p. 256. ISBN 978-1479846320.
- Jacobs, David (2000). Killer Babes: From the Files of True Detective Magazine. Kensington Books. p. 409. ISBN 0786010800.
- Kearney, Milo; Knopp, Anthony; Zavaleta, Antonio (2006). Further studies in Rio Grande Valley history. Brownsville, Texas: University of Texas at Brownsville and Texas Southmost College. p. 423.
- O'Kane, James M. (2005). Wicked Deeds: Murder In America. Transaction Publishers. p. 242. ISBN 1412841526.
- Tillman, Laura (2016). The Long Shadow of Small Ghosts: Murder and Memory in an American City. Simon and Schuster. p. 256. ISBN 978-1501104305.
