= Fernando De Leon (businessman) =

Mexican American businessman (born 1978)

- Born: 1978 (age 47–48); Brownsville, Texas, United States
- Citizenship: American; Mexican
- Occupations: Businessman; Investor; Philanthropist
- Known for: Real estate investments
- Website: leoncapitalgroup.com

Fernando De Leon (born 1978) is a Mexican American billionaire businessman, investor, and philanthropist. He is the founder and chief executive officer of Leon Capital Group, a real estate firm headquartered in Dallas, Texas. In 2025, De Leon received the Horatio Alger Award in recognition of his achievements as a Distinguished American. In April 2026, Forbes named De Leon No. 40 on its inaugural Forbes Self-Made 250 list, recognizing him among the greatest living self-made Americans. As of March 2026, Forbes valued De Leon's net worth at US$3.1 billion.

== Early life and education ==
De Leon was born in Brownsville, Texas, United States, and raised in Matamoros, Tamaulipas, Mexico with his parents and five older siblings. He claims to be a second cousin of Texas governor elect Gina Hinojosa. He attended school in Brownsville, where he learned English. At the age of 12, De Leon represented South Texas in the National Spelling Bee in Washington, D.C. He graduated from Saint Joseph Academy in Brownsville in 1997 and went on to receive a scholarship to attend Harvard College where he graduated cum laude in 2001.

== Career ==
As a teenager, De Leon used his bi-lingual skills as a translator for American developers building in Mexico under new NAFTA regulations. After college, his first job was as an analyst at Goldman Sachs. He moved on to pursue his own real estate development, beginning with a project in Dallas, Texas in 2004.

De Leon founded Leon Capital Group as a real estate development firm in 2006. He was able to invest throughout the 2008 financial crisis and acquire troubled properties and assets. Much of the firm's initial assets were in apartment buildings and retail centers across the southern United States. In 2015, De Leon began investing in the types of retail businesses that occupied the firm's real estate assets. This started with acquiring a single dentist office but has since expanded into Specialty Dental Brands and Frontline Dental Impact Specialists, which now have 430 locations combined and are owned by Leon Capital Group. De Leon designed a partnership model within his firm, in which Leon Capital Group shares the equity growth with its retail companies. His partner brands include Mattison Avenue Salons, Turnwell and Advanced MedAesthetic Partners.

In 2015, De Leon and his business partners started Crexi, a commercial real estate data platform. As of 2025, Crexi had over three million monthly users and is the company with the highest valuation owned by Leon Capital Group.

== Personal life and philanthropy ==
In April 2022, his foundation launched the De Leon Scholars Program, which awarded US$1 million for tuition assistance for students attending Saint Joseph Academy. This grant was the largest in the school's history.

In 2025, De Leon received the Horatio Alger Award, which honors individuals who overcame adversity in reaching their achievements.

De Leon serves on the board of many of the portfolio companies within Leon Capital Group, as well as the Harvard Interviewing Committee.

== Awards and honors ==
In April 2026, Forbes named De Leon No. 40 on its inaugural Forbes Self-Made 250 list, titled "The Greatest Living Self-Made Americans."
