= Sabal Palm Sanctuary =

Nature reserve and bird sanctuary in Texas, US

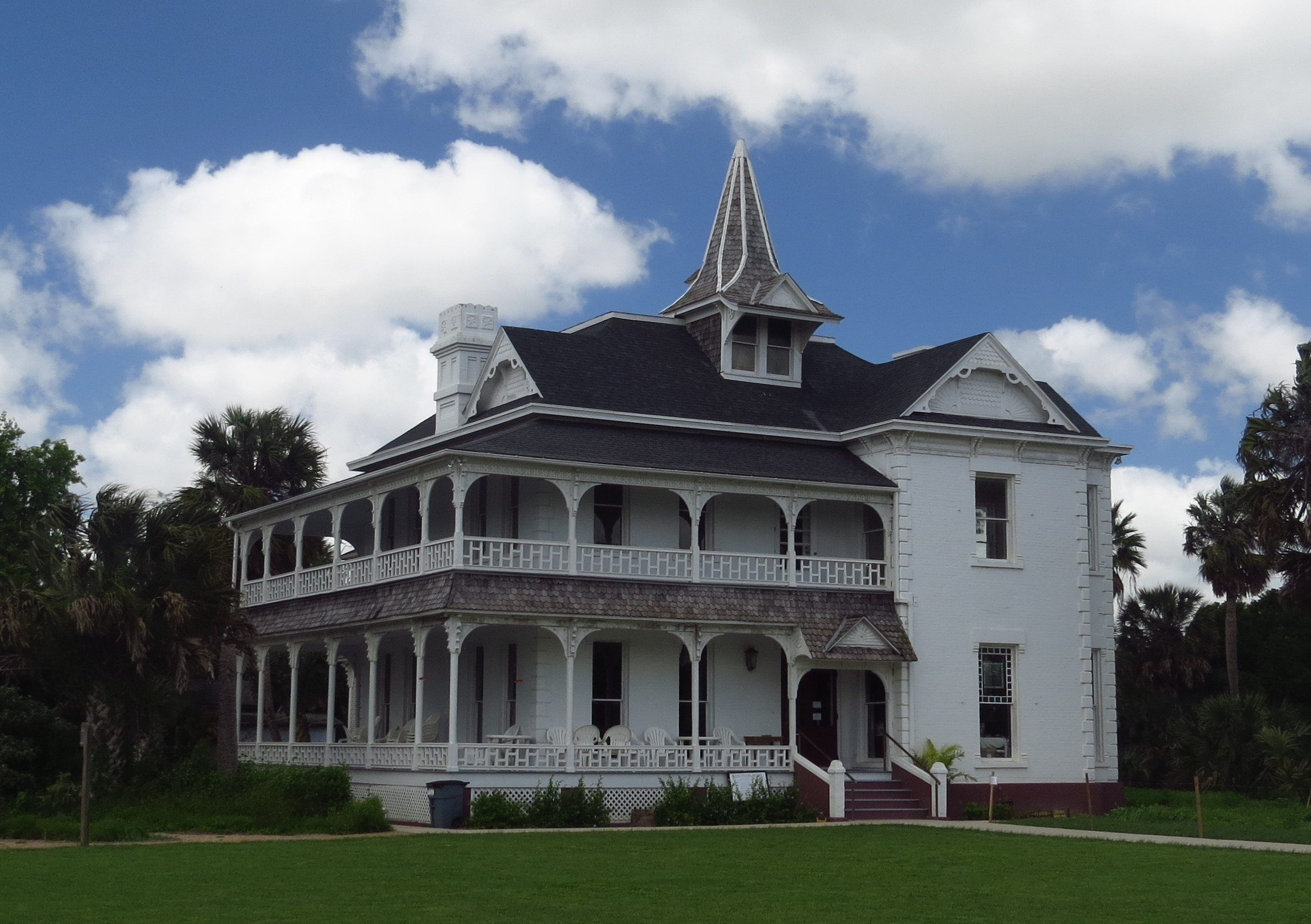
- Old Rabb Plantation House, headquarters for the Sabal Palm Sanctuary.
- Interactive map of Sabal Palm Sanctuary
- Location: Cameron County, Texas
- Nearest city: Brownsville
- Coordinates: 25°51′10″N 97°25′03″W
- Area: 557 acres (225 ha)
- Established: 1971
- Website: sabalpalmsanctuary.org

The Sabal Palm Sanctuary is a 557-acre (225-hectare) nature reserve and bird sanctuary located in the delta of the Rio Grande Valley in Cameron County near Brownsville, Texas. It is noted for being one of the last locations in the Rio Grande Valley with a profuse grove of sabal palms, an edible-heart-bearing palm much prized by pre-Hispanic inhabitants and noted by early explorers. As a relatively habitat-rich remnant of this Valley, it is a prized birdwatching and butterfly watching location for persons interested in the ecology of the Valley and adjacent states of northern Mexico.

The Sabal Palm Sanctuary closely approaches the southernmost point in the state of Texas, and is the southernmost point accessible to the public.

== History and current status ==
The Sanctuary occupies a parcel of the former Rabb Plantation, a 19th-century sugarcane plantation on the bank of the Rio Grande - at that time, a river deep enough to float light steamboats. The plantation's produce was shipped directly from the riverbank; the successful plantation's Queen Anne mansion, built by Frank and Lillian Rabb in 1891–1892, was adaptively remodeled in 2013 to serve as the Sanctuary's visitor center.

With modern transportation, much of the Valley's land was replanted for industrial citrus farming. In 1971, the Sanctuary parcel became the property of the National Audubon Society, which continued to own it as of 2015. In 2010, the Gorgas Science Foundation, a Valley-based nonprofit organization, leased the Sanctuary from the Society to operate and interpret it for the public.

The Sanctuary currently operates approximately 5 miles (8 km) of signed nature trails through the palm grove and adjacent habitats, including an old oxbow lake that is currently evolving into a wetland resaca. Other trails visit a butterfly garden and the shore of the Rio Grande. There is a $6 per person entrance fee.

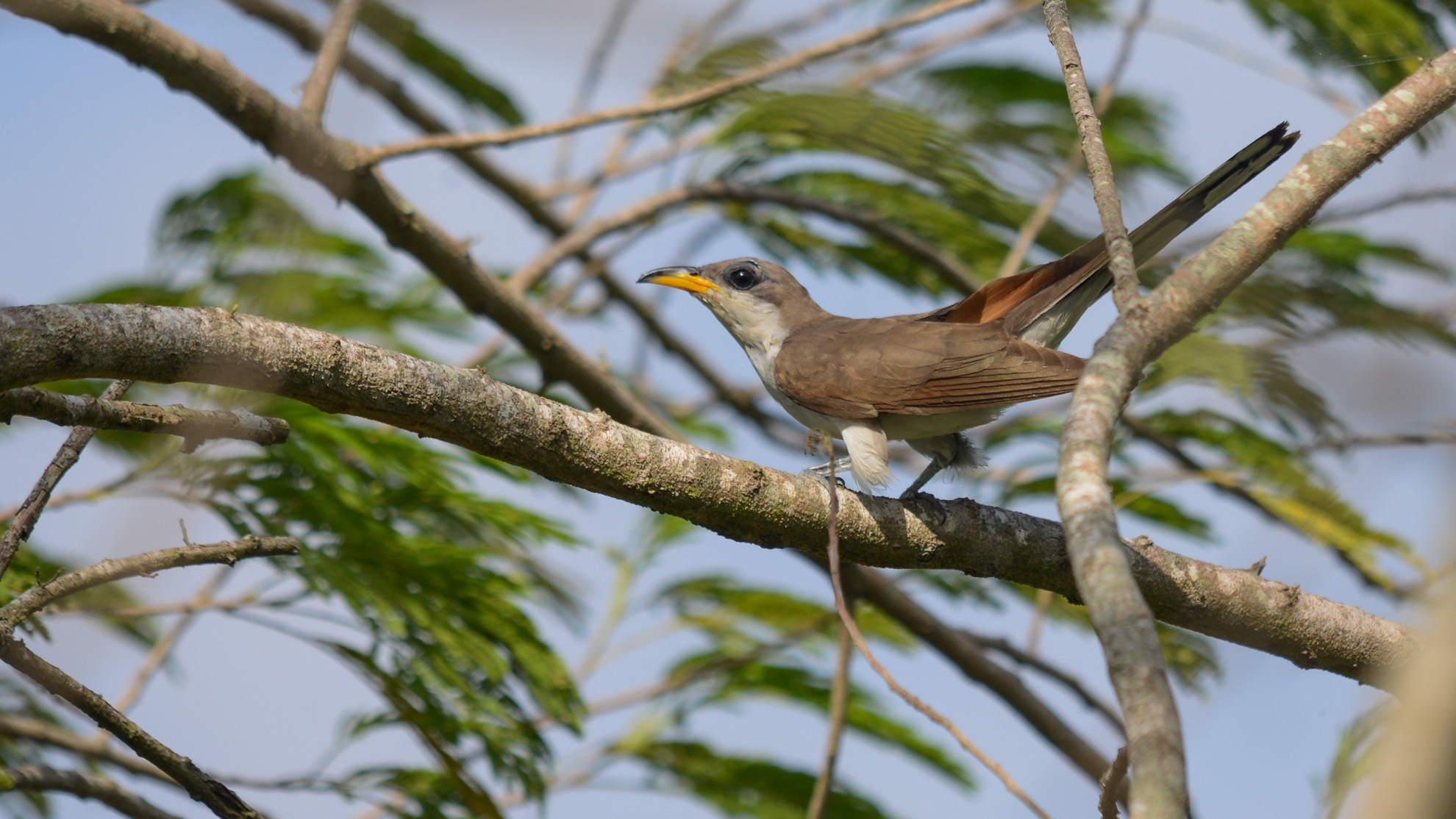
A Yellow-billed cuckoo (Coccyzus americanus) in the Sabal Palm Sanctuary

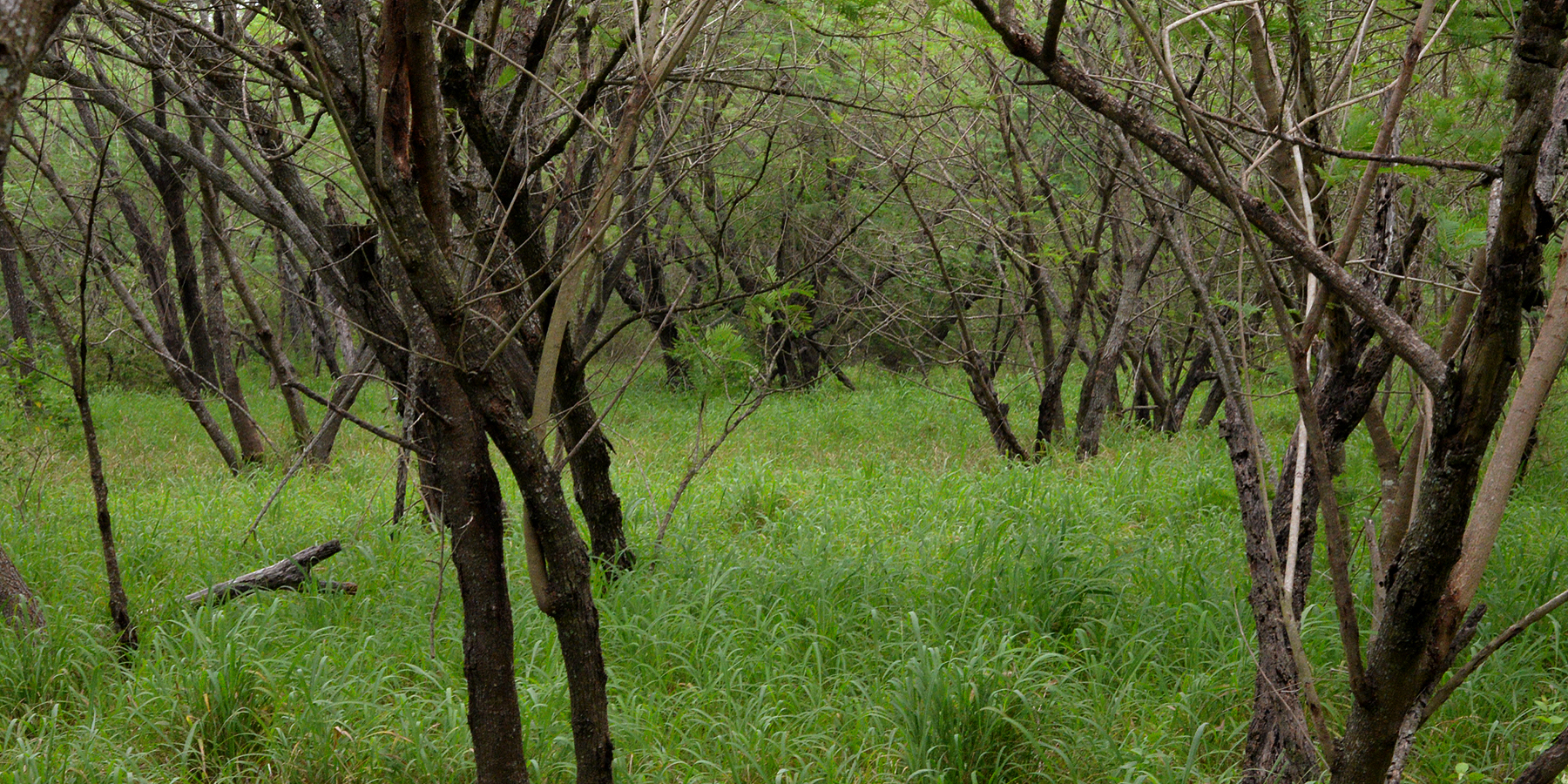
Mesquite woodlands in Sabal Palm Sanctuary (11 April 2016).

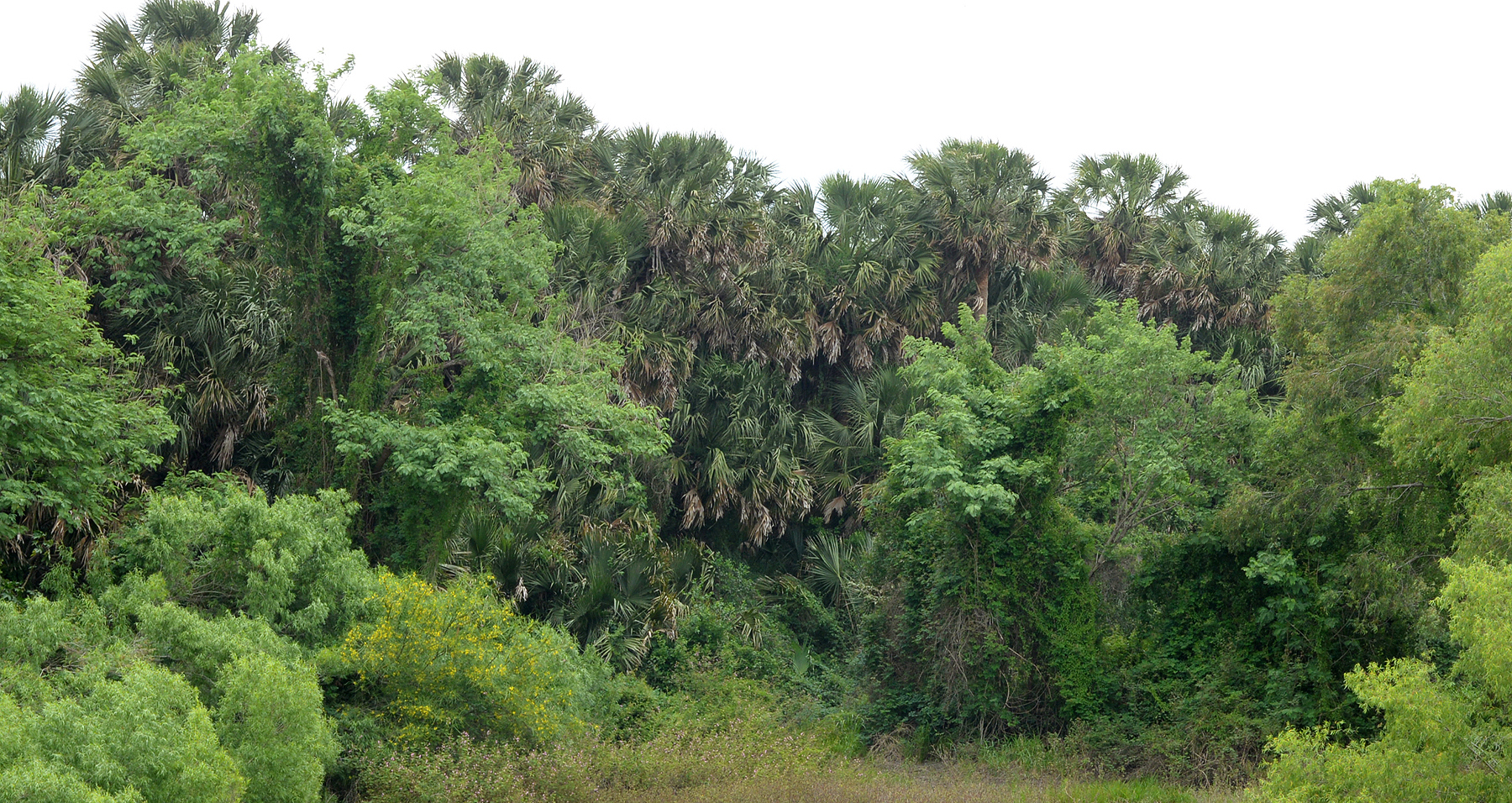
Old growth sabal palm (Sabal mexicana) grove, Sabal Palm Sanctuary (11 April 2016).

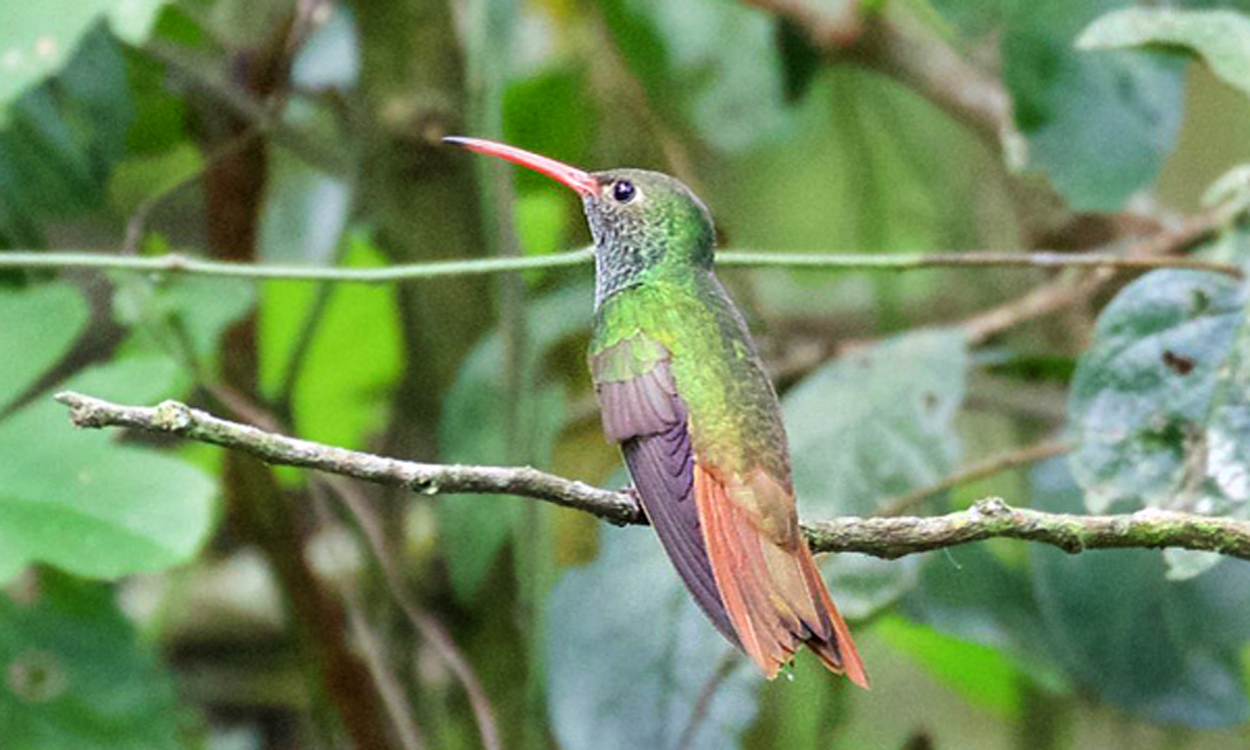
Buff-bellied Hummingbird (Amazilia yucatanensis), Sabal Palm Bird Sanctuary (21 September 2015).

== See also ==
- Lower Rio Grande Valley National Wildlife Refuge
