= Arroyo City, Texas =

Unincorporated community in Texas, US

- Unincorporated community
- Location within Texas Location within the United States
- Coordinates: 26°20′16″N 97°26′3″W
- Country: United States
- State: Texas
- County: Cameron
- Elevation: 10 ft (3.0 m)
- Time zone: UTC-6 (Central (CST))
  - Summer (DST): UTC-5 (CDT)
- Area code: 956
- GNIS feature ID: 2034723

Arroyo City is an unincorporated community in Cameron County, Texas, United States. The community had a population of 510 in 2017. It is located within the Rio Grande Valley and the Brownsville-Harlingen metropolitan area.

== History ==
Mexican herders settled in the area in the 1860s and named it after its location on the Arroyo Colorado. A post office opened in 1887, then closed in 1907. In 1910, the community had about 10 people and two stores. Scattered houses remained in the area in the 1930s. Several businesses and dwellings remained in the 1970s. In 1990 Arroyo City was marked on Texas state highway maps. The community's population was reported as 510 per a 2017 Official Texas State Map.

Vernon "Beau" Nelson, the stepfather of Joey Fischer, initially thought that his murder was tied to a legal dispute over a contract worth thousands of dollars he had with a Chinese shrimp firm based in Arroyo City that he had terminated.

== Geography ==
Arroyo City is located along Farm to Market Road 2925 and a mile east of Farm to Market Road 1847, 10 miles (16 km) northeast of Rio Hondo, 23 miles (37 km) northeast of Harlingen, and 29 miles (47 km) north of Brownsville in northeastern Cameron County.

== Education ==
In 1904, Arroyo City had a school with one teacher and 24 students. Today, the community is served by the Los Fresnos Consolidated Independent School District. Children in the community attend Las Yescas Elementary School, Liberty Memorial Middle School, and Los Fresnos High School.

== Media ==
KVJS is a Christian radio station licensed in the community.
