= Resaca (channel) =

Type of oxbow lake

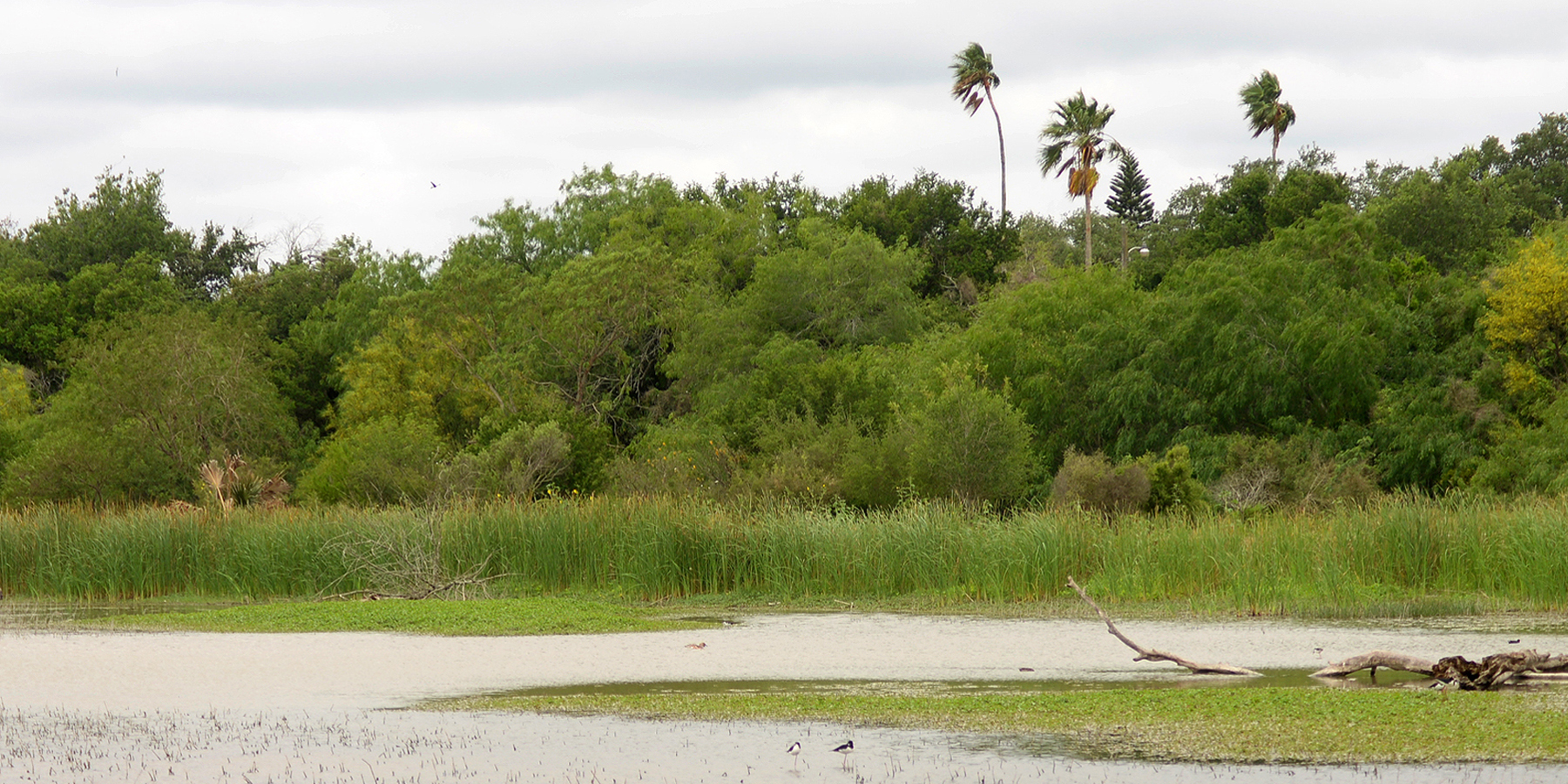
A resaca in Estero Llano Grande State Park

Resaca is the name given to a type of oxbow lake in the southern half of Cameron County, Texas. The resacas constitute former channels of the Rio Grande and are naturally cut off from the river, having no inlet or outlet.

== History ==
The Rio Grande's water moves from Colorado to the Gulf of Mexico. Every year during spring, melted snow would flow into the Rio Grande, bringing seasonal flood waters to the most southern tip of Texas. Given the overflow of the river's main and distributary channel banks, the Rio Grande would carve new river channels, known as resacas. When the seasonal flooding ended and the river retreated, the newly formed oxbow lakes remained, creating resacas all throughout the Rio Grande Valley.

=== Etymology ===
There are two explanations for the origin of the word resaca. The first explanation holds that it is a contraction of the Spanish phrase rio seco (dry river). The second explanation is that the word stems from the Spanish word resacar (to retake). The latter is the most plausible explanation given that the primary geological function of a resaca is to divert and dissipate floodwater from the river.

The word resaca is a regionalism. Elsewhere, these are referred to as oxbow lakes.

== See also ==
- Bayside Resaca Area
- Resaca de la Guerra
- Resaca de la Palma State Park
- Resaca de la Palma
- Resaca de los Cuates
- Resaca de los Fresnos
- Resaca del Rancho Viejo
- Resaca Rancho Viejo
- Sabal Palm Sanctuary
