= Vynthala Lake =

- Oxbow Lake (Thadakam) of Kanichan Thura
- Location within Kerala Location within India
- Location: Vynthala, Thrissur District, Kerala
- Coordinates: 10°15′38″N 76°17′40″E
- Type: oxbow lake
- Basin countries: India
- Surface area: 7 ha (17 acres)
- Surface elevation: 1,800 ft (549 m)
- Settlements: Mala

Vynthala Lake (Malayalam: വൈന്തല തടാകം) is a natural oxbow lake found in Vynthala, near Mala, Thrissur District of Kerala.

== Geography ==
Lake is also called Oxbow Lake (Thadakam), as it was formed from a "cutoff" of the Chalakudy River which flows nearby. The lake is considered to be the only one naturally formed Oxbow lake in whole of South India.

== History ==
The oxbow lake at Vynthala was identified in 1998 by a team of scientists led by Sunny George. Earlier the lake had a length of 2 kilometres (1.2 mi), but now only about 200 metres (660 ft) remain as the rest of the area has been reclaimed. The total area of the lake is around 7 hectares (17 acres). National Biodiversity Authority (NBA) and Kerala State Biodiversity Board (KSBB) are preparing a report to declare the lake as a Biodiversity Heritage Site (BHS).
