= Arroyo Colorado =

- Location of mouth

Location
- Country: United States
- State: Texas
- Counties: Hidalgo, Cameron, Willacy

Physical characteristics
- Source
  - location: Lake Llano Grande
  - coordinates: 26.1253539°N 97.9347232°W
- Mouth
  - location: Laguna Madre
  - coordinates: 26.4184033°N 97.3683122°W
- Length: 143.232 mi (230.510 km)

Arroyo Colorado is a river in Hidalgo, Cameron and Willacy Counties, Texas, that flows mostly eastward some 89 miles (143 km) from Lake Llano Grande into the Laguna Madre.

Arroyo Colorado is a name derived from Spanish meaning "red creek bed".

== See also ==
- Arroyo City, Texas
- Arroyo Colorado Estates, Texas
- List of rivers of Texas
