= Estero Llano Grande State Park =

State park in Texas, United States

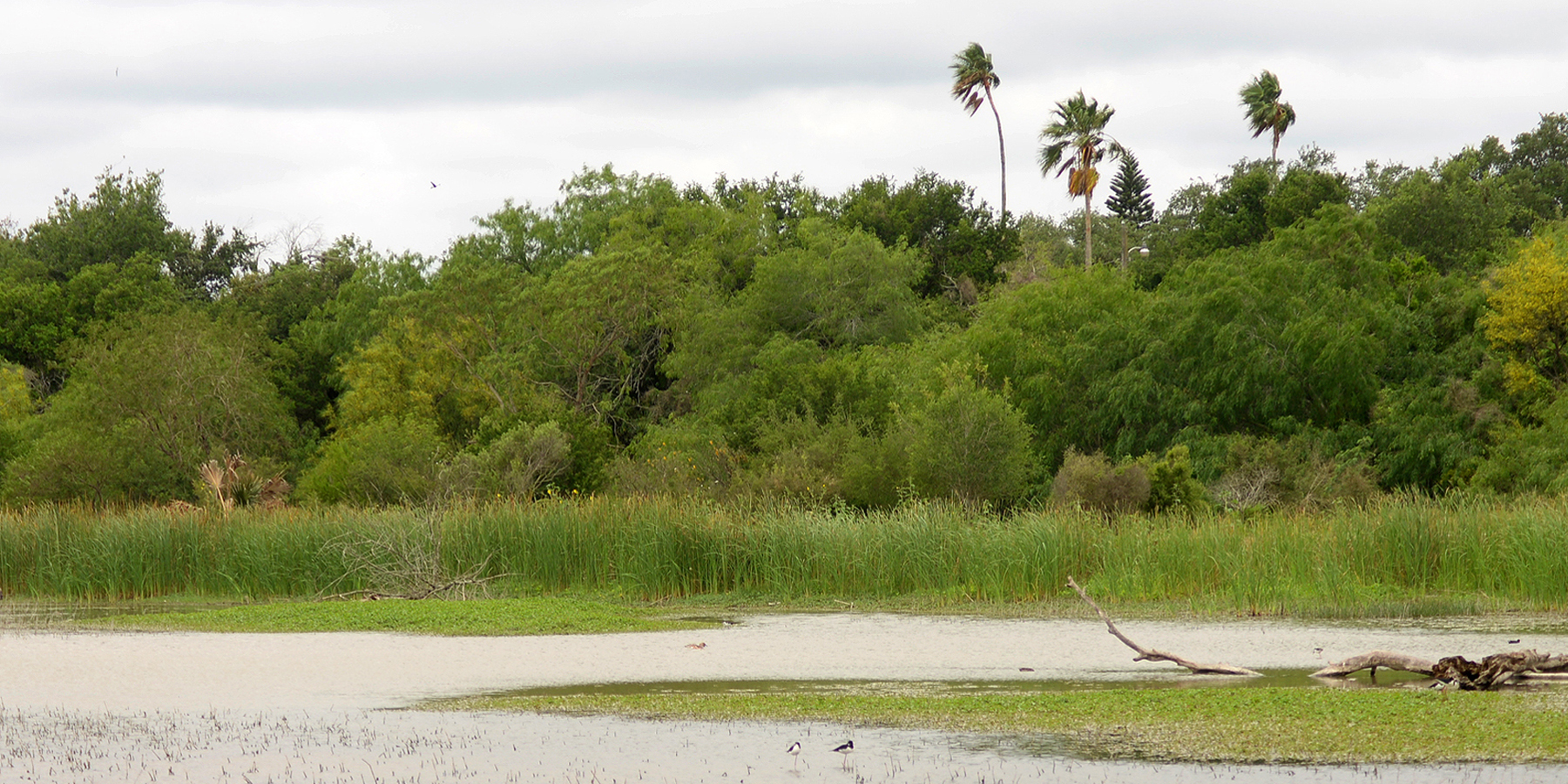
- A resaca in Estero Llano Grande State Park

- Location within Texas Location within the United States
- Location: Hidalgo County, Texas, United States
- Nearest city: Weslaco, Texas
- Coordinates: 26°07′35″N 97°57′23″W
- Area: 230 acres (93 ha)
- Established: 2006
- Visitors: 27,578 (in 2025)
- Governing body: Texas Parks and Wildlife Department
- Website: Official site

Estero Llano Grande State Park is a 230 acres (93 ha) state park in Hidalgo County, Texas, United States. The park opened in 2006 and is managed the Texas Parks and Wildlife Department. Estero Llano Grande is a prime spot for birdwatching with more than 350 species documented.

== Background ==
The land where the parks sits was part of the Llano Grande Land Grant granted to Juan José Hinojosa in 1776 by Charles IV of Spain. In early 2000, the state of Texas pieced together the current park from a variety of separate parcels.

The Arroyo Colorado and Llano Grande Lake border the park on the south.

== See also ==
- List of Texas state parks
- Museums in South Texas
- National Register of Historic Places listings in Hidalgo County, Texas
