= Rancho Viejo, Texas =

- Town
- Coordinates: 26°2′18″N 97°33′16″W
- Country: United States
- State: Texas
- County: Cameron

Area
  - Total: 2.31 sq mi (5.98 km^{2})
  - Land: 2.05 sq mi (5.31 km^{2})
  - Water: 0.25 sq mi (0.66 km^{2})
- Elevation: 30 ft (9 m)

Population (2020)
  - Total: 2,838
  - Density: 1,380/sq mi (534/km^{2})
- Time zone: UTC-6 (Central (CST))
  - Summer (DST): UTC-5 (CDT)
- ZIP code: 78575
- Area code: 956
- FIPS code: 48-60544
- GNIS feature ID: 1388590
- Website: www.ranchoviejotexas.com

Rancho Viejo is a town in Cameron County, Texas, United States. The population was 2,838 at the 2020 census, up from 2,437 at the 2010 census. The town is named from a ranch in that area named "Rancho Viejo" (Old Ranch). This ranch was owned by Blas María de la Garza Falcón, whose name was given to a nearby dam, Falcon Dam.

Rancho Viejo may be included as part of the Brownsville–Harlingen–Raymondville and the Matamoros–Brownsville metropolitan areas.

== Geography ==
Rancho Viejo is located at 26°2′18″N 97°33′16″W (26.038219, –97.554392).

According to the United States Census Bureau, the town has a total area of 2.3 square miles (6.0 km^{2}), of which 2.1 square miles (5.4 km^{2}) is land and 0.2 square miles (0.52 km^{2}) (7.05%) is water.

== Demographics ==
Historical population
Census	Pop.	Note	%±
1990	885		—
2000	1,754		98.2%
2010	2,437		38.9%
2020	2,838		16.5%
U.S. Decennial Census

=== 2020 census ===
Rancho Viejo racial composition (NH = Non-Hispanic) (Note: Note: the US Census treats Hispanic/Latino as an ethnic category. This table excludes Latinos from the racial categories and assigns them to a separate category. Hispanics/Latinos can be of any race.)
Race	Number	Percentage
White (NH)	670	23.61%
Black or African American (NH)	27	0.95%
Native American or Alaska Native (NH)	5	0.18%
Asian (NH)	83	2.92%
Some Other Race (NH)	4	0.14%
Mixed/Multi-Racial (NH)	36	1.27%
Hispanic or Latino	2,013	70.93%
Total	2,838	

As of the 2020 United States census, there were 2,838 people, 1,023 households, and 779 families residing in the town.

=== 2000 census ===
As of the census of 2000, there were 1,754 people, 705 households, and 511 families residing in the town. The population density was 832.6 inhabitants per square mile (321.5/km^{2}). There were 1,160 housing units at an average density of 550.6 per square mile (212.6/km^{2}). The racial makeup of the town was 87.80% White, 0.51% African American, 0.11% Native American, 4.33% Asian, 0.23% Pacific Islander, 5.13% from other races, and 1.88% from two or more races. Hispanic or Latino of any race were 48.00% of the population.

There were 705 households, out of which 29.5% had children under the age of 18 living with them, 63.5% were married couples living together, 6.5% had a female householder with no husband present, and 27.4% were non-families. 23.7% of all households were made up of individuals, and 7.4% had someone living alone who was 65 years of age or older. The average household size was 2.49 and the average family size was 2.94.

In the town, the population was spread out, with 23.3% under the age of 18, 4.4% from 18 to 24, 28.6% from 25 to 44, 26.9% from 45 to 64, and 16.9% who were 65 years of age or older. The median age was 41 years. For every 100 females, there were 95.8 males. For every 100 females age 18 and over, there were 94.4 males.

The median income for a household in the town was $64,038, and the median income for a family was $73,036. Males had a median income of $61,648 versus $34,750 for females. The per capita income for the town was $34,663. About 6.7% of families and 9.7% of the population were below the poverty line, including 9.9% of those under age 18 and 7.1% of those age 65 or over.

== Education ==
About half of Rancho Viejo is served by the Brownsville Independent School District. The other half is served by the Los Fresnos Consolidated Independent School District.

In addition, South Texas Independent School District operates magnet schools that serve the community.

== Notable people ==
- Roberto Cantoral (1935–2010), composer and songwriter
- Joey Fischer (1975–1993), Murdered high school senior; part of a murder case that brought national attention

== Country club ==
Rancho Viejo is also the name of the resort and country club that takes up much of the space in the town. It sprawls 1,400 acres (5.7 km^{2}), mostly accounted for by the golf courses.
