= Oxbow lake =

U-shaped lake or pool left by an ancient river meander

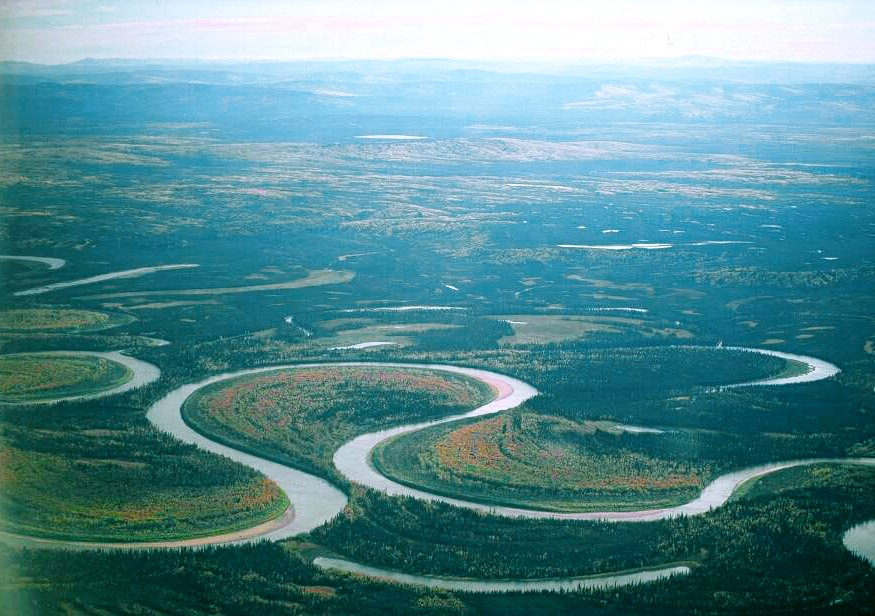
This picture of the Nowitna River in Alaska shows two oxbow lakes – a short one at the bottom of the picture and a longer, more curved one at the middle-right. The picture also shows that a third oxbow lake is probably in the making: the isthmus or bank in the centre of the most prominent meander is very narrow – much narrower than the width of the river; eventually, the two sections of river on either side of an isthmus like that tend to break through and create a new, straighter course; a new river bank then starts to accumulate, sealing off the meander and leaving another oxbow lake.

An oxbow lake is a U-shaped lake or pool that forms when a wide meander of a river is cut off, creating a free-standing body of water. The word "oxbow" can also refer to a U-shaped bend in a river or stream, whether it is cut off from the main stream or not. It takes its name from an oxbow which is part of a harness for oxen to pull a plough or cart.

In South Texas, oxbows left by the Rio Grande are called resacas. In Australia, oxbow lakes are called billabongs.

== Geology ==
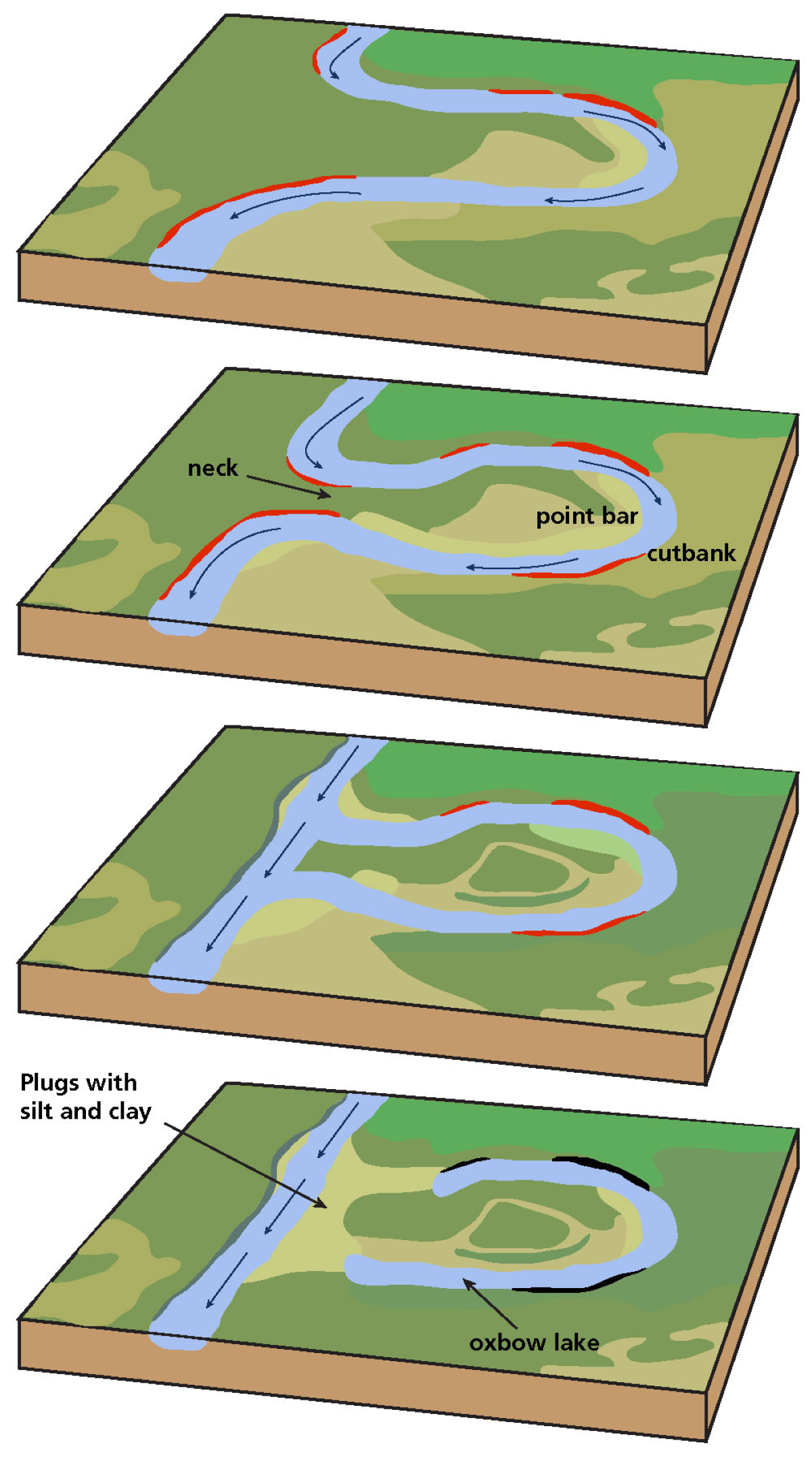
Meandering rivers continuously erode and redeposit sediment along their bends, later forming oxbow lakes.

An oxbow lake forms when a meandering river erodes through the neck of one of its meanders. This takes place because meanders tend to grow and become more curved over time. The river then follows a shorter course that bypasses the meander. The entrances to the abandoned meander eventually silt up, forming an oxbow lake. Oxbow lakes are stillwater lakes, with no current flowing through them, which causes the lake bed to gradually accumulate silt, becoming a bog or swamp and then evaporating completely.

When a river reaches a low-lying plain, often in its final course to the sea or a lake, it meanders widely. In the vicinity of a river bend, deposition occurs on the convex bank (the bank with the smaller radius). In contrast, both lateral erosion and undercutting occur on the cut bank or concave bank (the bank with the greater radius). Continuous deposition on the convex bank and erosion of the concave bank of a meandering river cause the formation of a very pronounced meander with two concave banks getting closer. The narrow neck of land between the two neighboring concave banks is finally cut through, either by lateral erosion of the two concave banks or by the strong currents of a flood. When this happens a new, straighter river channel develops—and an abandoned meander loop, called a cutoff, forms. When deposition finally seals off the cutoff from the river channel, an oxbow lake forms. This process can occur over a time from a few years to several decades, and may sometimes become essentially static.

The gathering of erosion products near the concave bank and the transporting of them to the convex bank is the work of the secondary flow across the floor of the river in the vicinity of a river bend. The process of silt deposition, sand and gravel on the convex bank is clearly illustrated in point bars.

The effect of the secondary flow can be demonstrated using a circular bowl. Partly fill the bowl with water and sprinkle dense particles such as sand or rice into the bowl. Set the water into circular motion with one hand or a spoon. The dense particles quickly sweep into a neat pile in the center of the bowl. This is the mechanism that leads to the formation of point bars and contributes to the formation of oxbow lakes. The primary flow of water in the bowl is circular and the streamlines are concentric with the side of the bowl. However, the secondary flow of the boundary layer across the floor of the bowl is inward toward the center. The primary flow might be expected to fling the dense particles to the perimeter of the bowl, but instead the secondary flow sweeps the particles toward the center.

The curved path of a river around a bend makes the water's surface slightly higher on the outside of the bend than on the inside. As a result, at any elevation within the river, water pressure is slightly greater near the outside of the bend than on the inside. A pressure gradient toward the convex bank provides the centripetal force necessary for each parcel of water to follow its curved path.

The boundary layer that flows along the river floor does not move fast enough to balance the pressure gradient laterally across the river. It responds to this pressure gradient, and its velocity is partly downstream and partly across the river toward the convex bank. As it flows along the floor of the river, it sweeps loose material toward the convex bank. This flow of the boundary layer is significantly different from the speed and direction of the primary flow of the river, and is part of the river's secondary flow.

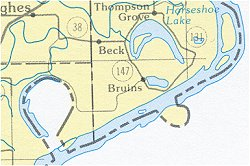
A Horseshoe or oxbow lake near Hughes, Arkansas, on the border between Arkansas and Mississippi. The bulges in the border reflect changes in the course of the river; when the river shifted its course and cut off the former channel, the border remained unchanged.

River flood plains that contain rivers with a highly sinuous platform are populated by longer oxbow lakes than those with low sinuosity. This is because rivers with high sinuosity have larger meanders, and greater opportunity for longer lakes to form. Rivers with lower sinuosity are characterized by fewer cutoffs and shorter oxbow lakes due to the shorter distance of their meanders.

== Oxbow lake ecology ==
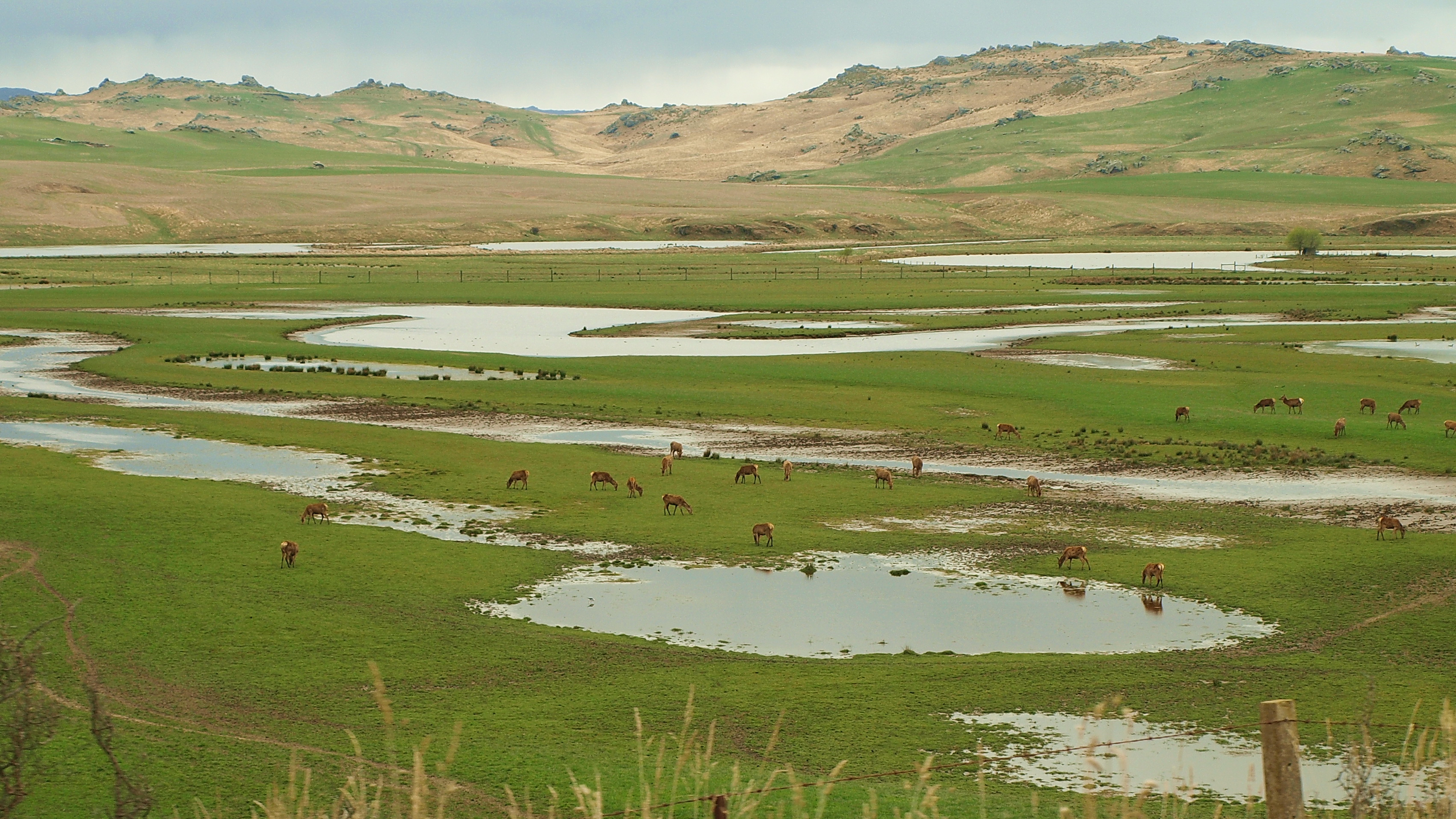
Oxbow lakes on New Zealand's Taieri River have been converted into water meadows.

Oxbow lakes serve as important wetland ecosystems. In the United States, oxbow lakes serve as the primary habitat for water tupelo and the iconic bald cypress. The numerous oxbow lakes of the Amazon River are a favorable habitat for the giant river otter. Oxbow lakes may also be suitable locations for aquaculture.

Oxbow lakes contribute to the health of a river ecosystem by trapping sediments and agricultural runoff, thereby removing them from the main river flow. However, this is destructive of the oxbow lake ecosystem itself. Oxbow lakes are also vulnerable to heavy metal contamination from industrial sources.

== Artificial oxbow lakes ==
Oxbow lakes may be formed when a river channel is straightened artificially to improve navigation or for flood alleviation. This occurred notably on the upper Rhine in Germany in the nineteenth century.

An example of an entirely artificial waterway with oxbows is the Oxford Canal in England. When originally constructed, it had a very meandering course, following the contours of the land, but the northern part of the canal was straightened out between 1829 and 1834, reducing its length from approximately 146 to 125 km (91 to 77 1/2 mi) and creating a number of oxbow-shaped sections isolated from the new course.

== Notable examples ==
- Bole and Burton Round in West Burton, Nottinghamshire, England are a good example of previous lakes in a close proximity to one another.
- Bayou Brevelle in Natchitoches Parish, United States was created after the Red River of the South altered its course due to the effects of the Great Raft.
- Carter Lake, United States was created after severe flooding in 1877 led to the Missouri River shifting approximately two kilometres (1 1/4 miles) to the southeast.
- Cuckmere Haven in Sussex, England contains a widely meandering river with many oxbow lakes, often referred to in physical geography textbooks.
- Halfmoon Lake in downtown Eau Claire, United States was formed due to a shift in the course of the Chippewa River, which now flows immediately to the south.
- Kanwar Lake Bird Sanctuary, India contains rare and endangered migratory birds and is one of Asia's largest oxbow lakes.
- The Oxbow, a four-kilometre (2 1/2-mile) bend in the Connecticut River, is disconnected at one end.
- There are many oxbow lakes alongside the Mississippi River and its tributaries. The largest oxbow lake in North America, Lake Chicot (located near Lake Village, United States), was originally part of the Mississippi River, as was Horseshoe Lake, the namesake for the town of Horseshoe Lake, United States. Reelfoot Lake in west Tennessee is another notable oxbow lake; it was formed when the Mississippi River took a new channel following the 1811–12 New Madrid earthquakes.
- The upper reaches of New Zealand's Taieri River has also cut a multitude of oxbow lakes in its upper course near the town of Paerau. Some of this area has been converted into water meadows.
- Vynthala Lake, Chalakudy, India is formed from a "cutoff" of the Chalakudy River which flows nearby.
- West Lake (Hồ Tây) in Tây Hồ District, Vietnam is formed by a cutoff of the Red River.

There has also been a possible oxbow lake postulated in Saraswati Flumen near Ontario Lacus on Saturn's moon Titan.

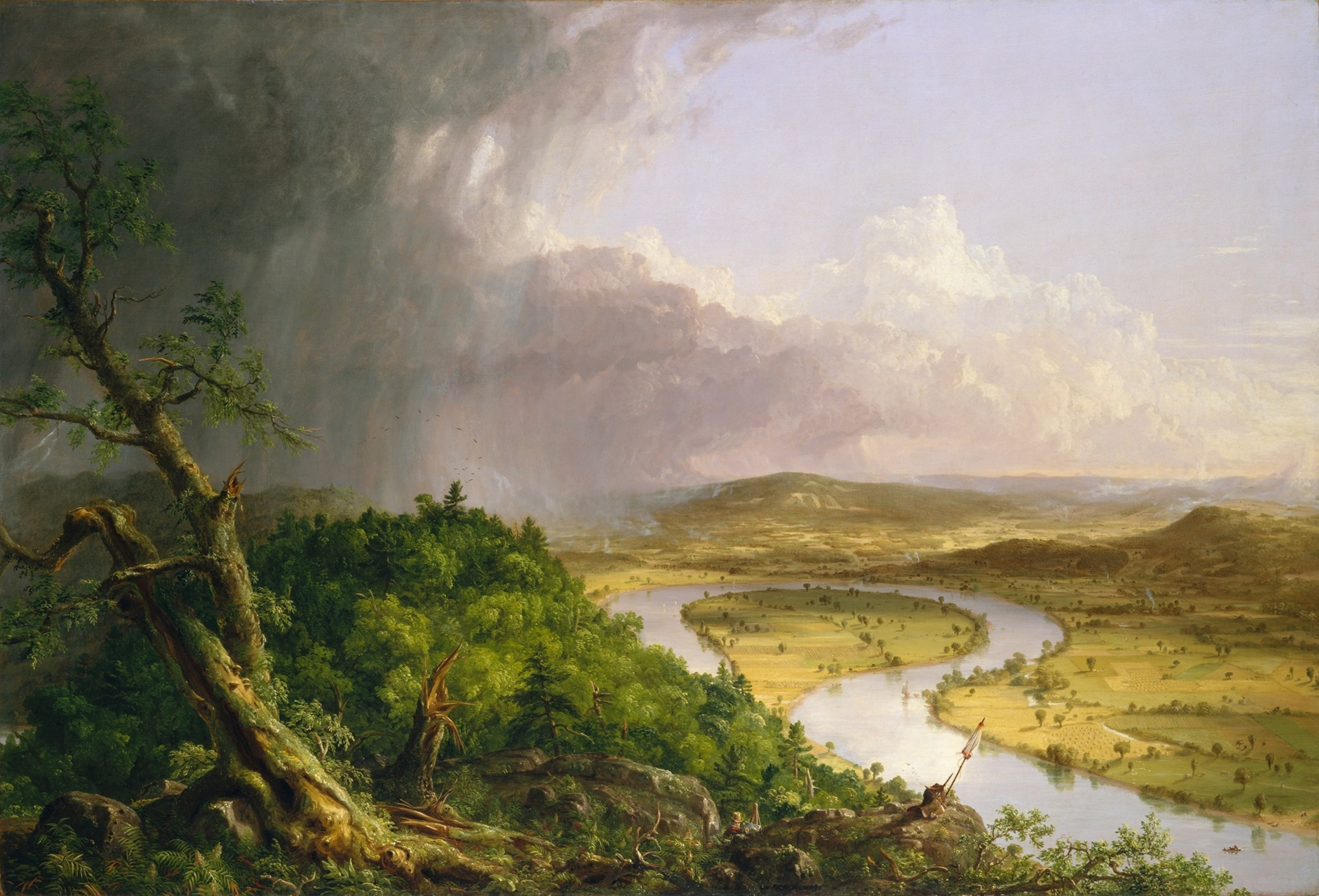
The Oxbow, on the Connecticut River, Thomas Cole

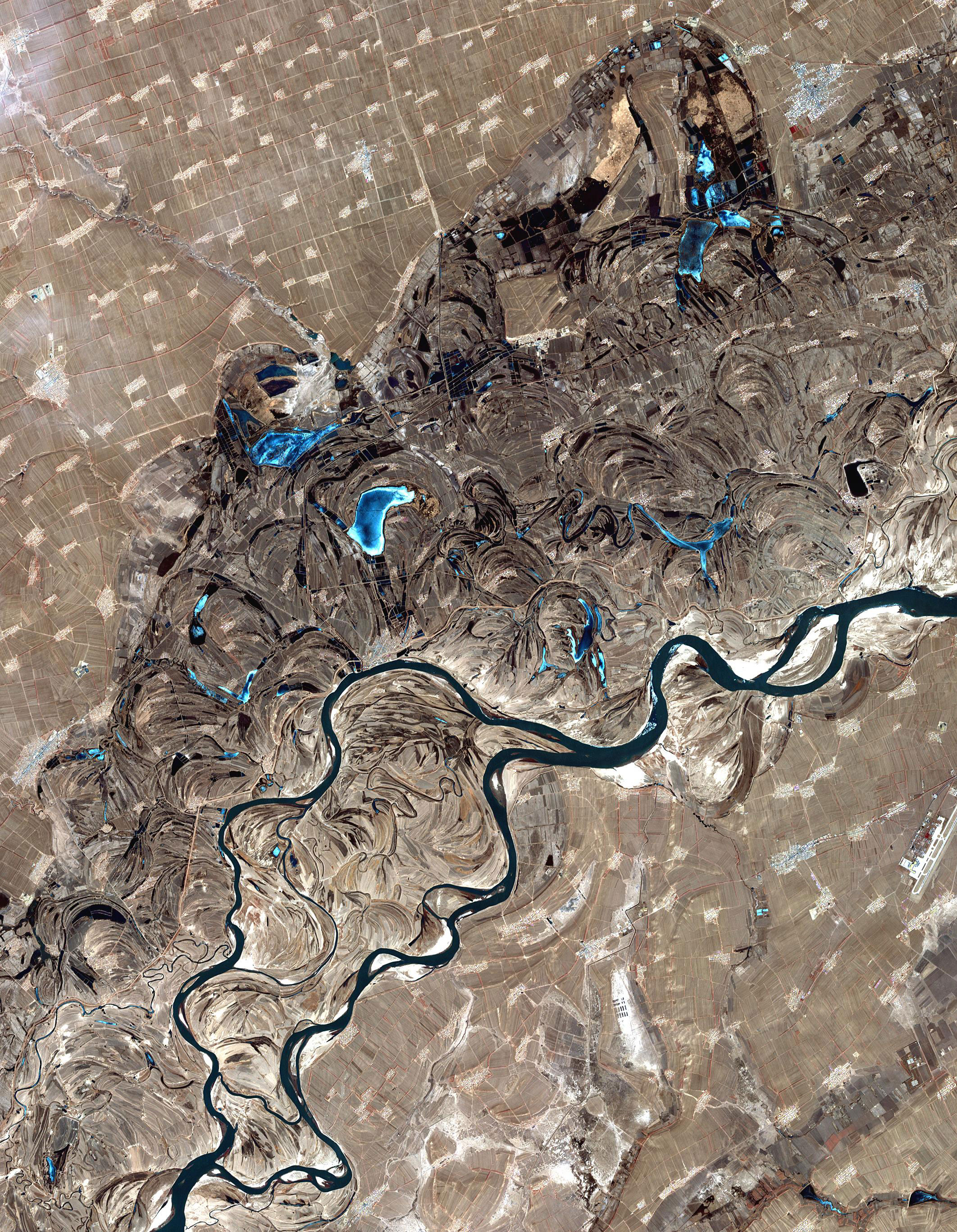
The swirls and curves of the previous courses of the Songhua River in northeast China

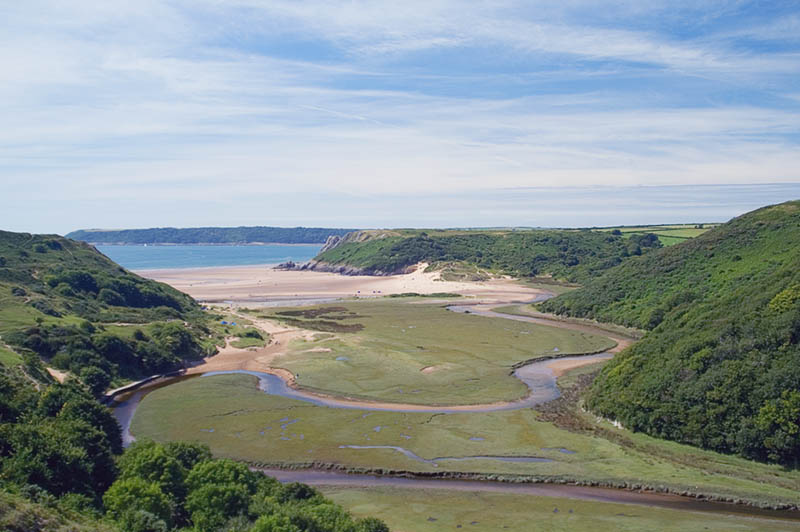
Early stages of formation of coastal plain oxbow lake in the Gower Peninsula of southwest Wales

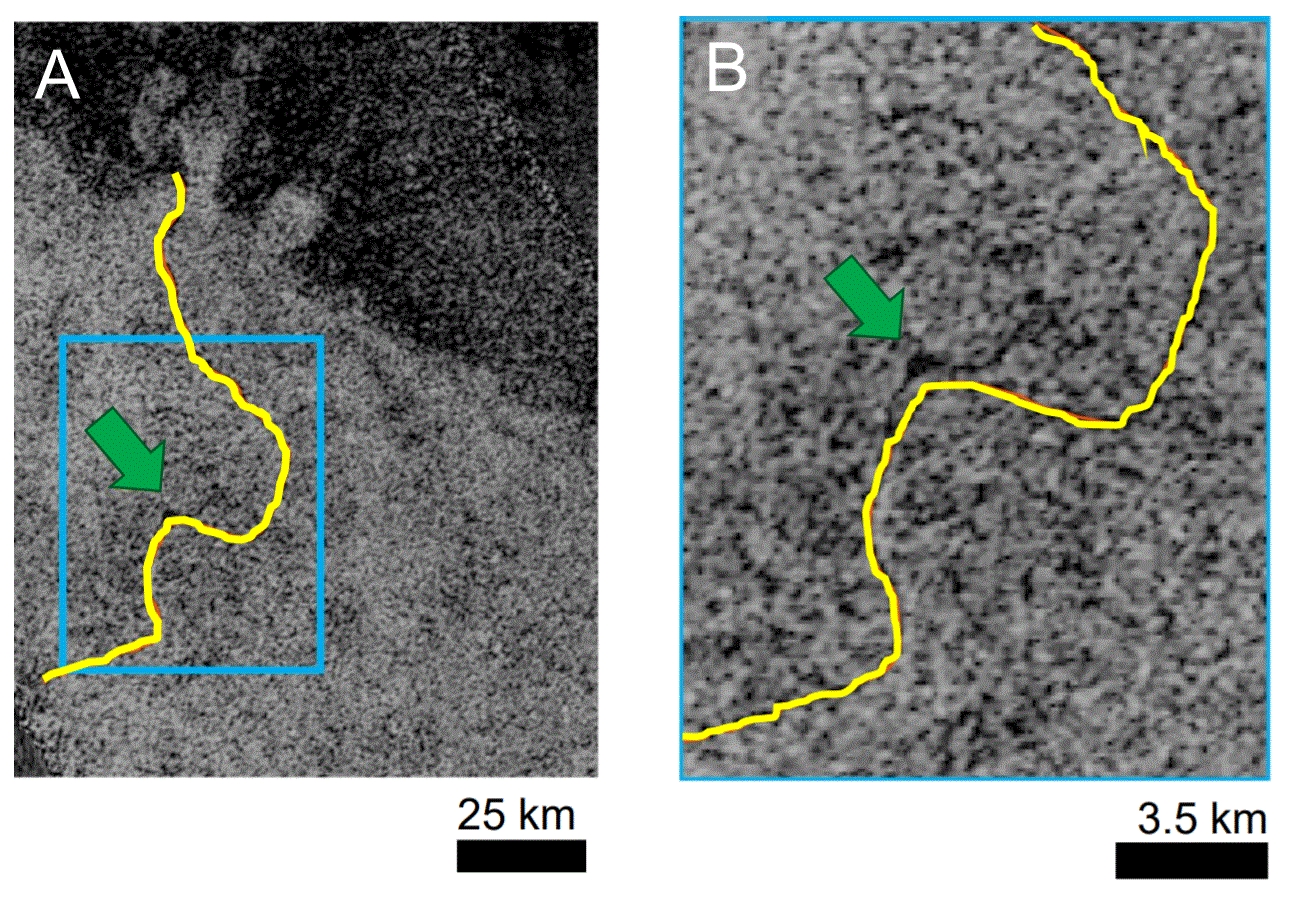
The proposed oxbow lake on Saturn's moon Titan, from Cassini RADAR images

== See also ==
- Anabranch
- Bayou
- Billabong
- Fallacy regarding formation of point bars
- Resaca (channel)
- Secondary flow around river bends
