= Glossary of geography terms (N–Z) =

This glossary of geography terms is a list of definitions of terms and concepts used in geography and related fields, including Earth science, oceanography, cartography, and human geography, as well as those describing spatial dimension, topographical features, natural resources, and the collection, analysis, and visualization of geographic data. It is split across two articles:

- Glossary of geography terms (A–M) lists terms beginning with the letters A through M.
- This page, Glossary of geography terms (N–Z), lists terms beginning with the letters N through Z.

Related terms may be found in Glossary of geology, Glossary of agriculture, Glossary of environmental science, and Glossary of astronomy.

== N ==
nadir
narrows

A land or water passage that is confined or restricted by its narrow breadth, often a strait or a water gap.
nation
A stable community of people formed on the basis of a common geographic territory, language, economy, ethnicity, or psychological make-up as manifested in a common culture.
national mapping agency
A governmental agency which manages, produces, and publishes topographic maps, geographic data, and sometimes cadastral information that is specific to an individual nation or political territory, such as the United Kingdom's Ordnance Survey.
national park
A type of protected area created and managed as a public park by a national governmental authority for conservation purposes. Though individual governments designate national parks differently, they usually share the common goal of preserving natural or semi-natural landscapes (often wilderness) for posterity and as symbols of national pride.
natural landscape
The original landscape that exists before it is acted upon by humans. Contrast cultural landscape.
nautical mile
A unit of distance traditionally defined as the length equal to one minute of arc (1/60 of one degree) along a meridian of the Earth. Because the Earth is not a perfect sphere, the length of one minute of arc at the Equator differs from that measured at the geographic poles; thus the modern internationally agreed-upon standard defines the nautical mile as the average of these two extremes: 1,852 metres (6,076 feet; 1.151 miles). It is widely used in air, marine, and space navigation as well as for defining the limits of territorial waters.
navigable
1. (of a place) Capable of being navigated; sufficiently deep, wide, predictable, and/or free of obstructions to afford easy or safe passage to vessels such as ships or automobiles. The term is often used to describe river channels and coastal inlets.
2. (of a vessel) In a navigable condition; steerable; seaworthy or roadworthy.
navigation
1. The determination of position and direction, generally by comparing the navigator's position to known locations or patterns.
2. The process of monitoring and controlling the movement of a vehicle or craft from one place to another.
neap tide
A tide of decreased tidal range occurring semi-monthly as a result of the Moon being in quadrature with respect to the Earth and the Sun (i.e. in the first quarter or last quarter phases, when roughly half of the lunar disk is visible), or the time period recurring every 14 days during which such tides occur. The average height of the high waters of the neap tides occurring at a particular location is called neap high water or high water neaps, and that of the corresponding low waters is called neap low water or low water neaps. Compare spring tide.
nearshore
The part of a beach between the shoreline and the line at which the waves break.
neatline
A line separating the main body of a map from the map's margin. On a standard quadrangle map, the neatlines are the meridians and parallels delimiting the quadrangle.
neck
1. A narrow stretch of land with water on each side, e.g. an isthmus or promontory.
2. A narrow stretch of woodland or of ice.
3. A high level pass, especially the narrowest part.
nehrung
A long sandspit separating a haff or lagoon from the sea, especially one along the south coast of the Baltic Sea.
neighborhood

A geographically localized community within a larger city, town, suburb, or rural area, particularly one which supports considerable face-to-face interactions between residents.
ness
In Scotland and parts of England, a headland or cape, or another name for a cuspate foreland; or a spur of a mountain ridge.
névé
A young, granular type of snow that has been partially melted, refrozen, and compacted but is not yet in the form of ice. Névé that survives a full season of ablation becomes firn, which is older and slightly more compact, and thus contributes to the formation of glaciers. The term may also refer to the alpine region surrounding the head of a glacier where snowfall accumulates and becomes névé, feeding the glacier.
nodal region
A region characterized by a set of places connected to another place by lines of communication or movement.
North Geographic Pole

The point in the Northern Hemisphere where the Earth's axis of rotation meets its surface. It is the northernmost point on Earth, directly opposite the South Geographic Pole, and defines the direction of true north at a latitude of 90 degrees North; its longitude can be assigned any degree value. Unlike the South Pole, the North Pole is not located on a continental landmass but in the middle of the Arctic Ocean. See also North Magnetic Pole.
North Geomagnetic Pole

The point in the Northern Hemisphere where the axis of a theoretical simplified dipole passing through the center of the Earth would intersect the Earth's surface. It is antipodal to the South Geomagnetic Pole. Because of the fluid nature of the Earth's molten core, the true axis of the Earth's magnetic field is not a perfect dipole, and so the Geomagnetic Poles and the actual Magnetic Poles lie some distance apart.

A top-down view of the polar latitudes of Earth's Northern Hemisphere, centered on the Geographic North Pole and showing the distinct locations of the actual Magnetic North Pole and the idealized Geomagnetic North Pole as of 2017. Only the Geographic Pole is in a stationary position; the Magnetic and Geomagnetic Poles are both gradually moving eastward.

North Magnetic Pole

The point in the Northern Hemisphere at which the Earth's magnetic field points vertically downward. It is close to but distinct from the Geographic North Pole and the Geomagnetic North Pole, and its precise location varies considerably over time due to frequent magnetic changes in the Earth's core. Its counterpart in the Southern Hemisphere is the South Magnetic Pole, though the two poles are not directly opposite each other.
Northern Hemisphere
The half sphere of the Earth that is north of the Equator. It is opposite the Southern Hemisphere.
northing
nubbin
A small, gentle hill consisting of a bedrock core dotted with rounded residual boulders. Nubbins form in a similar way to castle koppies and bornhardts.
nunatak

== O ==
oasis
A combination of a human settlement and an area of cultivated vegetation in an otherwise desolate desert or semi-desert environment, made fertile when sources of fresh water, such as underground aquifers, irrigate the surface naturally or via man-made wells.
oblate spheroid
The approximate geometric shape of the Earth: a three-dimensional ellipsoid that is nearly but not exactly a true sphere, being instead slightly flattened at the poles and slightly elongated at the equator.
obsequent
(of a stream, river, or any natural water flow) Flowing in the direction opposite to that of the dip of the underlying rock strata. Contrast consequent and subsequent.
ocean
The vast, contiguous body of salt water covering more than 70% of the Earth's surface area and surrounding the continental landmasses; or any portion of this larger body of water that is divided and distinguished from the other portions, each of which is called an ocean, by the presence of the landmasses. The International Hydrographic Organization recognizes five principal oceanic divisions on Earth: from largest to smallest, they are the Pacific Ocean, Atlantic Ocean, Indian Ocean, Southern Ocean, and Arctic Ocean.
ocean current
ocean floor
See seabed.
ocean trench
A long, narrow, very deep depression in the ocean floor at the junction of two tectonic plates, where one plate is subducted steeply beneath the other, often penetrating the mantle. See also deep.

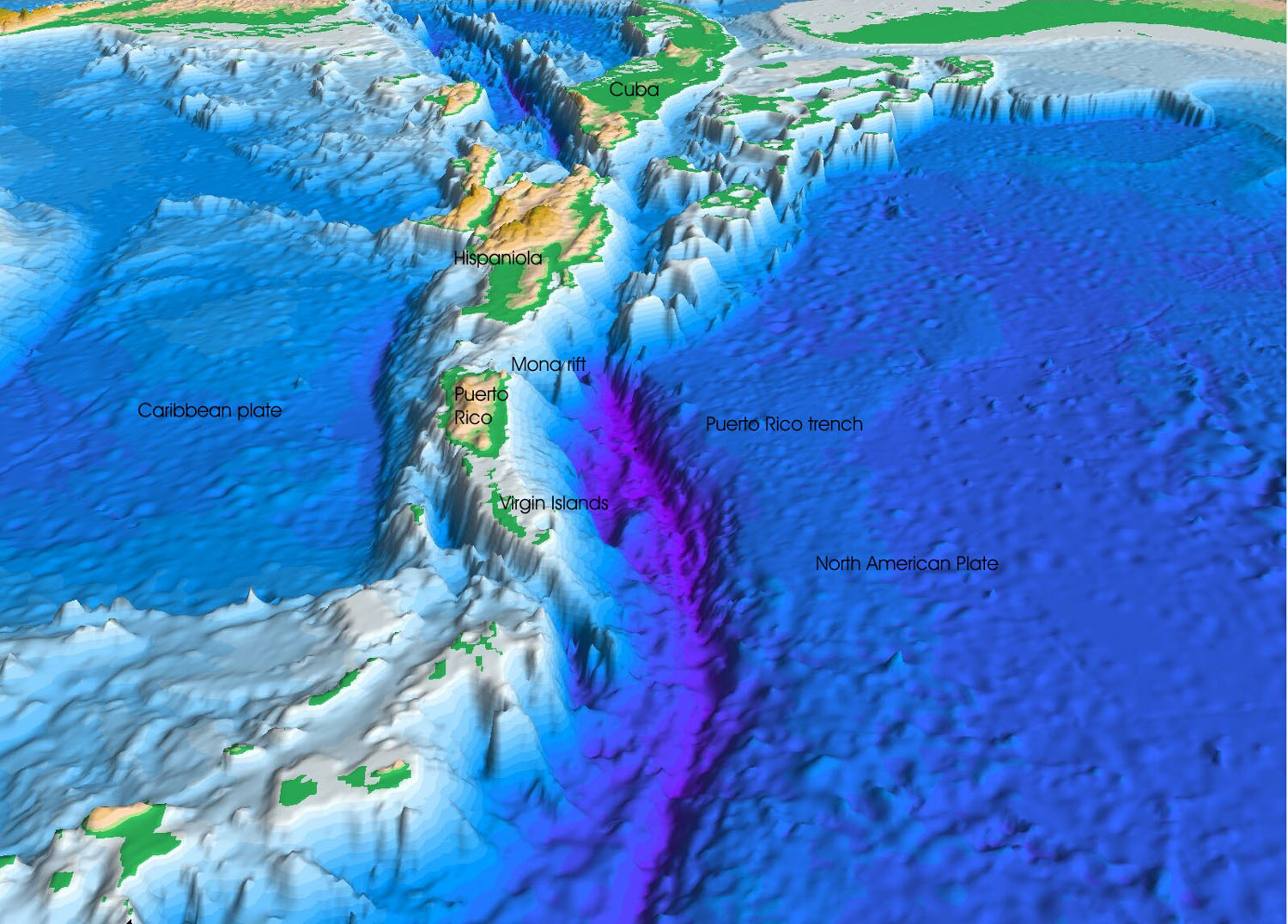
A bathymetric map looking west across the Caribbean Sea. The purple area is the Puerto Rico Trench, the deepest trench in the Atlantic Ocean.

oceanography

The scientific study of the Earth's oceans and all processes and phenomena relating to them, including their formation and evolution over time; their physical and chemical properties and how these vary within the ocean and across its boundaries; their interactions with landmasses along coasts; the bathymetry and geology of the sea floor; currents, waves, and geophysical fluid dynamics; marine life and ecosystems; and how humans affect and are affected by oceans. The interdisciplinary field draws from and involves a diverse range of other sciences, including physics, biology, geology, hydrology, meteorology, and climatology, among others.
oeconym

A toponym or proper name for a house or other residential building, or in the broadest sense for any inhabited settlement, such as a village, town, or city.
oecumene
See ecumene.
offshore
1. Moving away from the shore and toward the sea.
2. Located at a point or in an area that is relatively close to but still seaward of the shore (as with an offshore island). Contrast onshore.
3. Seaward of the foreshore and the backshore.
ogive
One of a series of regularly spaced bands of alternating height and color visible on the surface of some glaciers, resulting from seasonal patterns of alimentation and ablation. Because ice flows faster near the center of the glacier, where there is less friction with the surrounding glacial bed, ogives are usually shaped into conspicuous arcs that point towards the terminus of the glacier.
ojo
In the southwestern United States, a small pond, lake, or spring, especially a hot spring.
one-commodity country
A country that relies on one principal export for much of its earnings.
open ocean
The part of the ocean that is beyond or outside of coastal areas, i.e. distant from land and not enclosed or partially enclosed by it. In oceanography, the term is synonymous with pelagic zone and is often defined as all oceanic waters seaward of any continental shelf; politically and economically, "open ocean" usually refers to all areas of a sea or ocean that are not within territorial waters (hence, any area that is within international waters) or, much more restrictively, not within any sovereign state's exclusive economic zone. See also high seas.
open range
A cattle- or sheep-ranching area characterized by a general absence of fences and in which livestock are by law allowed to roam freely.
opisometer

An instrument used to measure the lengths of arbitrary curved lines, especially the distances of rivers and roads on a map.
ordinal directions
See intercardinal directions.
ordnance datum (OD)
Any vertical datum used by the British Ordnance Survey as the basis for reporting elevations on maps. In modern Great Britain, the standard ordnance datum is the ODN, defined as the mean sea level calculated from hourly observations of the tidal gauge at Newlyn, Cornwall, between 1915 and 1921. All heights shown on British maps are measured from this benchmark.
orientation
The position of or the act of positioning a person or object with respect to the directional points of a compass, especially the placement of a map or surveying instrument in the field so that a north–south line on the map or instrument lies parallel to a north–south line on the ground. Determining one's orientation at a given time is the chief aim of orienteering, and is generally of critical importance in navigation.
orienteering
The use of a map and compass to navigate over unfamiliar terrain, either by land or water; or a recreational activity or competitive sport in which participants navigate in this way, generally on foot from point to point along a predetermined route, and often in wilderness areas while racing to complete the course within a certain period of time or before competitors.
orographic rainfall
Precipitation that results when moist air is lifted over a topographic barrier, such as a mountain range.
orography
A branch of physical geography and geomorphology concerned with the scientific study and description of the topographic relief of the Earth, particularly of mountains and hills, and more broadly of any elevated terrain.
orthodrome
See great circle.
orthodromic distance
See great-circle distance.
orthophotograph

An aerial photograph or satellite image that has been geometrically corrected or orthorectified such that the scale is uniform across all parts of the image, allowing the image to align with a particular map projection. In an uncorrected aerial photo, distances on the ground may be distorted by topographic relief, camera tilt, or the curvature of the Earth; techniques of digital image processing can compensate for these distortions, often by combining multiple images captured from slightly different perspectives into a single composite image. Orthophotos can be used to measure true distances because they accurately depict the relative sizes and positions of features on the Earth's surface.
outback
In Australia, the vast, remote, sparsely populated backcountry. See also bush.
outcrop

Any visible exposure of bedrock or ancient superficial deposits on the surface of the Earth; or more generally, any bare, rocky surface that is topographically distinct from the surrounding terrain. Outcrops occur frequently in places where the rate of erosion exceeds the rate of weathering, such as on steep hillsides and mountains, river banks, and coastlines.
outwash
Rocky and sandy surface material deposited by melted water that flows from a glacier.
outwash plain
A smooth, flat plain of sandy or gravelly alluvial sediment formed by outwash deposited in front of the toe of a melting glacier, with larger material deposited closer to the terminal moraine.
overbank
1. Alluvial sediment, usually consisting of fine sand, silt, and clay, that has been deposited on the floodplain of a river or stream by flood waters that have broken through or overtopped the river's banks.
2. The stage when a river or stream overflows the banks of its normal channel and spreads on to a floodplain, depositing such sediment.
overburden
In strip mining, the uneconomic material covering a mineral seam or bed that must be removed before the valuable mineral can be extracted.
oxbow
1. A wide U-shaped meander in a river or stream.
2. The lake formed when a meander is cut off from the main stem of the river, creating a separate body of water.

== P ==
Pacific-type coastline
See concordant coastline.
padang
An uncultivated, treeless grassland in Southeast Asia, sometimes swamp-like, supporting a scrubby heath-type vegetation common on leached sandy soils.
palisade
1. A wall of wooden stakes used as a defensive barrier.
2. A line of bold cliffs, especially one showing basaltic columns.
palsa

An elliptical dome-like permafrost mound containing alternating layers of ice lenses and peat or mineral soil, commonly 3–10 metres (10–33 ft) high and 2–25 metres (7–82 ft) long, and occurring frequently in bogs in the Arctic and subarctic zones of discontinuous permafrost.
paludal
Of or pertaining to a swamp or marsh, or to sediments that accumulate in a marshy environment.
pampa

In parts of South America, a vast, fertile, grassy plain, or the temperate lowland region encompassing these plains.
pan
Any shallow, generally rounded basin or hollow, which may seasonally capture and hold water from rainfall or snowmelt, especially one occurring in an arid or semi-arid region; more specifically, the flat central part of such a depression, which may be temporarily or seasonally flooded.
panhandle
See salient.
panhole

A rounded or circular depression eroded into flat or gently sloping cohesive rock, typically shallow and ranging in diameter from a few centimeters to several meters, that is capable of collecting and holding rainwater and snowmelt. The term is sometimes used interchangeably with pothole, though the latter may also refer to distinct geological features.
pantanal
In southern Brazil, a wetland region consisting of a usually dry savanna that is seasonally flooded by a river.
pantograph
An instrument that enables the mechanical copying of a map or technical drawing on a selectable scale, such that the movement of one pen, in tracing an image, produces identical movements in a second pen, resulting in a duplicate image that is the same size, enlarged, or miniaturized with respect to the original. Pantographs typically consist of hinged rods arranged in the shape of a parallelogram which rotate about a fixed point.
parallel
1. (geometry) Extending in the same direction, equidistant at all points, and never converging or diverging; having the same orientation, nature, tendency, or course; corresponding or similar.
2. (geography) Another name for a circle of latitude.
parish
A type of subnational division of a country or federal state used for religious, administrative, or other purposes.
park
pass
See mountain pass.
passive glacier
A glacier with low rates of both alimentation and ablation because it receives only light snowfall and undergoes little melting throughout the year. Such glaciers move very slowly and transport relatively small amounts of ice and debris. Contrast active glacier.
pasture
Any land used for grazing by livestock, often a natural grassland supporting native grasses and forbs with little or no active management by humans, as opposed to a meadow, where the vegetation is mown for hay or silage.
peak
1. A pointed or protruding top or other vertical projection on a landform, e.g. a mountain, especially implying the highest point or elevational maximum, i.e. the summit.
2. A mountain as a whole, in particular a high, isolated, or prominent one.
pediment
An eroded, often bare rock platform, cut into the local bedrock, usually slightly concave and triangular in shape and extending over a considerable area at the foot of an abrupt mountain slope or face, the lower edge sloping gently away. Pediments form basal slopes of transport for weathered material derived from the steeper slope above, and are characteristic of arid and semi-arid lands.
pediplain
pedology
The scientific study of the morphology, composition, and spatial distribution of soils, with an emphasis on classifying soils and understanding their formation and evolution.
pedosphere
The uppermost layer of the Earth's crust that is composed of soils and subject to pedological processes such as soil formation and erosion, a consequence of dynamic interactions between the lithosphere, atmosphere, hydrosphere, and biosphere.
pelagic zone
peneplain
A low-relief plain leveled by long-term erosion, often implying a landscape that is in the final stages of fluvial erosion during an extended period of tectonic stability, i.e. approaching the point at which all initial topographic inequalities such as mountains and hills have been eroded and evenly redistributed into a broad, flat, uniform surface at or near sea level.
peninsula
A piece of land surrounded almost entirely by water while still being connected to a mainland from which it projects.
perceptual region
An area of the Earth's surface that is defined by the perceptions of the people living there or by those of the general society, and thus is based largely on subjective or qualitative distinctions.
perched water table
perennial stream
A stream that normally flows continuously throughout the entire year, without drying up, as opposed to a transient or intermittent stream.
pericline

An anticline in which the rock strata have been arched up in the shape of a dome, such that the beds dip away on all sides from a higher central point.
periglacial
1. Of or relating to an area located adjacent to or on the margin of an ice sheet or glacier, either presently or in the past, or to associated glacial or cryological phenomena.
2. Describing any place where seasonal cycles of freezing and thawing modify the landscape in a significant manner.
periplus

A historical manuscript listing the ports, safe anchorages, and coastal landmarks that a maritime vessel could expect to encounter along a shore or coastline, arranged in order according to a particular direction of travel and including the intervening distances between them. See also itinerarium.
peri-urban
Describing a transitional zone of mixed rural and urban land uses located immediately beyond the suburban fringe of a metropolitan area.
permafrost
A permanently frozen layer of soil, or any ground at high latitude or high elevation that remains frozen year-round.
petrographic province
photic zone

The uppermost layer of a body of water (e.g. a lake or ocean), defined by the maximum depth to which sunlight can penetrate the water column. The photic zone usually supports large populations of photosynthetic organisms and the majority of the aquatic life inhabiting the body as a whole.
photogrammetry
1. The science and technology of obtaining reliable information about physical objects and environments through the process of recording, measuring, and interpreting photographic images (usually aerial or orbital ones) and patterns of electromagnetic radiant imagery and other phenomena.
2. The science of extracting three-dimensional measurements from two-dimensional data, such as images.
photo-relief
The use of shading on a topographic map to give the illusion of elevational relief, as if the image was produced from a photograph of an illuminated three-dimensional model of a physical surface, with the light conventionally coming from the northwest direction.
phreatic water
See groundwater.
phreatic zone

The part of an aquifer that is below the water table, where nearly all pores and fractures are fully saturated with water. Contrast vadose zone.
physical geography

The branch of geography that studies processes and patterns in the natural environment, such as the atmosphere, hydrosphere, geosphere, and biosphere, as opposed to the cultural or built environment. Along with human geography, it is one of the two major sub-fields of geography.
physiographic region
A portion of the Earth's surface with a common topography and morphology.
physiography
Another name for physical geography.
piedmont

A geographic region of relatively low, gently rolling hills lying or formed at the base of a higher mountain range or other upland area; a transition zone characterized by gradual increases in elevation from plains or lowlands to topographically higher areas. As a proper noun, "Piedmont" may refer in particular to a formally defined region in northwest Italy immediately south of the Alps, or to a broad, informal region on the eastern seaboard of the United States extending from the Blue Ridge Mountains to the Atlantic coastal plain.
piezometric surface

pingo
A periglacial landform consisting of a relatively large conical mound of soil-covered ice, commonly 30–50 metres (100–160 ft) high and up to 1,000 metres (0.6 mi) in diameter, and that grows and persists in part as a result of hydrostatic pressure within and below the permafrost of Arctic and subarctic regions.
pinnacle

Any natural, free-standing, vertical or nearly vertical column of earth or rock in the shape of a tall, often slender shaft or spire, and which is distinguished by its isolation from nearby rocks or other landforms. The term is applied to a wide variety of geological formations of various sizes and has numerous regional and local synonyms with which it may be used more or less interchangeably. See also demoiselle, hoodoo, prominence, stack, and zeuge.
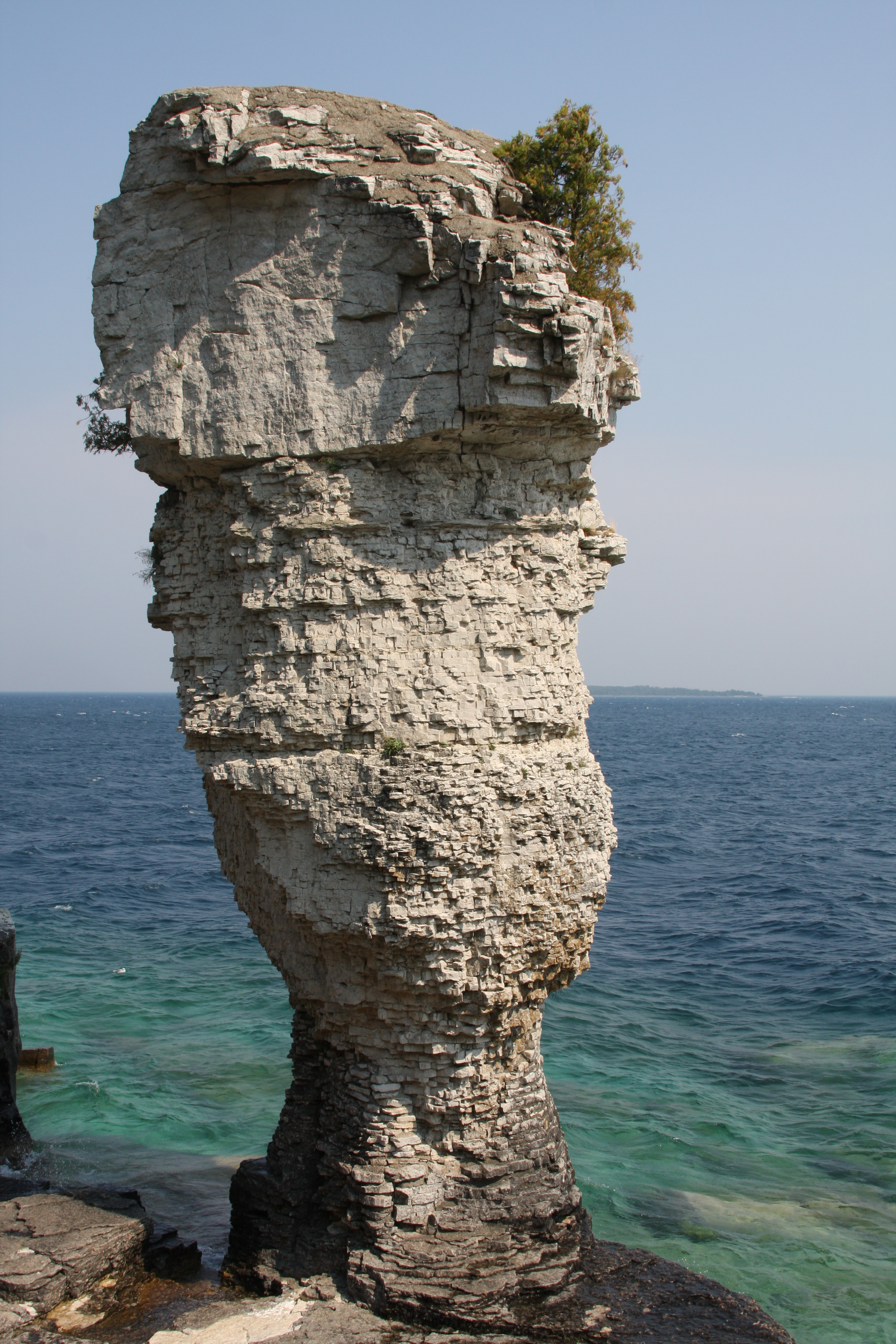
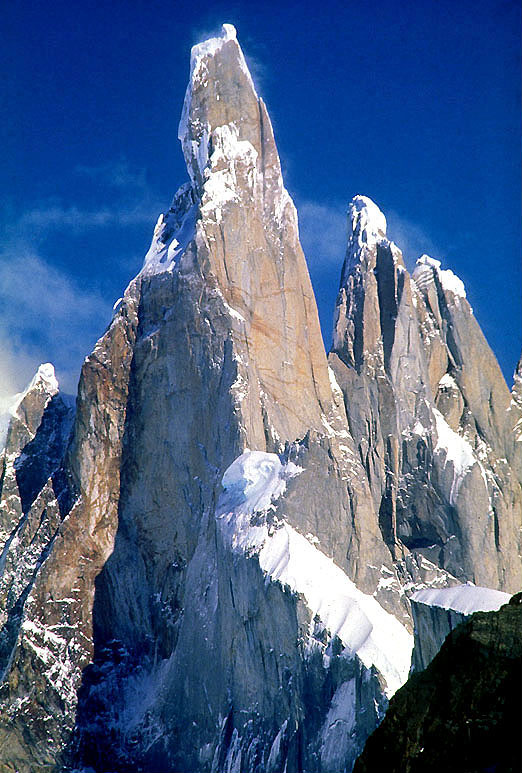
Rock spires or pinnacles may range in size from small pillars a few metres tall to entire mountains stretching thousands of metres from base to summit. Left: Large Flowerpot on Flowerpot Island, Ontario, Canada; 12 metres (39 ft). Right: Southeast face of Cerro Torre, border of Chile and Argentina; 2,100 metres (6,900 ft).
pit crater

A type of crater formed by the sinking or collapse of the surface lying above a void or empty chamber. Pit craters are similar to calderas and are often associated with volcanic activity, but lack the ejecta deposits and lava flows of volcanic craters.
place
A particular point on the Earth's surface, or the area surrounding such a point, having or encompassing a definite position; a location, often specifically named, that is identifiable in social interaction because humans have endowed it with meaning or purpose; or a mental representation of a physical space created from functional or emotional associations in the human mind. The concept of place – how places are created, identified, mapped, connected, and used – is fundamental to all of geography.
place identity
place utility
The measure of approval or satisfaction accorded by an individual to a location in his or her action space; the value or usefulness of a particular place as perceived by a particular person. Dissatisfaction with place utility may result in migration.
placename
See toponym.
placer
1. (mineral deposit) An accumulation of valuable minerals, particularly gold, formed by gravity separation from a source rock during natural sedimentary processes. The minerals, weathered from rocks or veins, are washed out by streams and mixed with alluvial deposits of sand or gravel, from which they can then be extracted by placer mining.
2. (reef) A flat, shallow sandbank or reef submerged beneath the ocean surface, often with a sandy bottom suitable as an anchorage for seagoing vessels.
plain
Any broad, flat expanse of land that generally does not show significant variation in topography or elevation.
plane table

A small drawing board mounted on a tripod, used in surveying, site mapping, and related disciplines to provide a solid and level surface upon which to make drawings, charts, and maps while in the field.
planimetric map
A map which uses a two-dimensional coordinate system, where each point is represented by only two coordinates (x, y), as if all of the depicted features existed within a single, flat plane. These maps usually exclude information about vertical position and therefore do not show topographic relief and represent only horizontal distances.
plat
A cadastral map, drawn to scale, showing the legal boundaries and divisions of a surveyed tract of land, particularly of the type used to divide real property for sale and settlement in the Public Land Survey System of the United States.
plate tectonics
A geologic theory that the bending (folding) and breaking (faulting) of the solid surface of the Earth results from the slow movement of large sections of that surface called tectonic plates.
plateau

A large area of relatively flat terrain that is significantly higher in elevation than the surrounding landscape, often having one or more sides with steep slopes.
platted land
Land that has been divided into surveyed lots.
playa
An exceptionally flat, arid basin that is the dry bed of an evaporated lake; or the shallow, usually saline lake itself which periodically forms when the basin is temporarily covered with water, e.g. after substantial rainfall. See also salt pan.
Playfair's law
In hydrology, an empirical relationship which observes that, especially in areas of uniform bedrock and structure which have been subject to consistent rates of erosion for long periods of time, the size of a valley is directly proportional to the size of the river or stream that drains it, and that confluences between streams in such valleys are generally accordant in level.
plucking

An erosional phenomenon whereby a glacier gradually scours and displaces pieces of rock from the bedrock beneath it and transports them along with the glacial flow of ice and debris. As the glacier moves down a valley, friction causes the basal ice to melt and infiltrate joints and cracks in the bedrock; repeated freezing and thawing widens and deepens these cracks, eventually loosening the rock and causing large blocks and boulders to be carried along by the overlying ice. These boulders are often deposited hundreds of kilometers from their source, becoming erratics. The term is also sometimes used to describe the similar process of quarrying, which occurs on a smaller scale in fast-moving rivers and streams.
plug
A cylindrical mass of volcanic rock marking the neck of an ancient volcano, especially one exposed by denudation of the surrounding cone.
plumb line
A vertical reference line created by suspending a weight, known as a plumb bob or plummet, from a string above the Earth's surface and allowing it to hang freely in the direction of the pull of gravity. A precursor to the spirit level, plumb lines are used to establish a vertical datum in a wide range of applications, particularly in surveying to determine the nadir of a point in space, and often in combination with an instrument to set the instrument precisely over a fixed survey marker.
plunge pool
A deep depression at the base of a waterfall into which the water drops with great force, plucking and abrading the rock beneath and behind the falls and creating an often nearly circular concavity which may remain filled with water long after the waterfall itself dries up.
plural society
A situation in which two or more distinct cultures occupy the same territory but maintain their separate cultural identities.
point bar
A depositional feature made of alluvium that accumulates on the inside bend of a meandering stream or river, below the slip-off slope and often directly opposite a cut bank. Point bars are usually crescent-shaped beaches of sand, silt, or gravel, similar to shoals and river islands.
point of interest (POI)
A specific location, often identified by specific geographic coordinates, that is useful, notable, valuable, interesting, or significant for any reason, especially as a destination for potential visitors and especially one that is considered notable enough to be marked with a dedicated point or label on a map. Establishing whether or not a particular location is "of interest" and thus whether or not it is useful to show on a map depends on the reasons for creating the map and the importance of the location to the map's intended users. On topographic maps, for example, points of interest are often natural features such as mountain summits, water sources, and other physical landmarks, whereas on road maps they commonly include gas stations, restaurants, hotels, campgrounds, and tourist attractions. POIs are important in geocoding and navigation, and the term is sometimes used synonymously with waypoint.
polar aspect
A planar map projection with its origin located at either the North or the South geographic pole.
polar circle
Either of the two circles of latitude enclosing the Earth's polar regions: the Arctic Circle in the Northern Hemisphere and the Antarctic Circle in the Southern Hemisphere.
polar ice cap

Either of the two very large regions near the Earth's geographical poles that are seasonally or persistently covered in ice, which occurs because high-latitude regions receive less direct solar radiation than other regions and therefore experience much lower surface temperatures. The Earth's polar ice may cover both land and sea, and varies in size seasonally and with long-term climate change. They typically cover a much larger area than true ice caps and are more correctly termed ice sheets.
polar region
Either of the two high-latitude regions surrounding the Earth's geographical poles (the North and South Poles), which are characterized by frigid climates and extensive polar ice caps. The polar region of the Northern Hemisphere is often called the Arctic and that of the Southern Hemisphere is called the Antarctic.
polder

A low-lying tract of land enclosed by dikes, forming an artificial hydrological entity by creating land from a naturally inundated area, e.g. by reclaiming land from a lake or sea, or by building barriers around a floodplain or marsh and then draining it. All polders are eventually below the surrounding water table some or all of the time, making them especially prone to flooding, and they often require continuous draining.
pole
1. An extreme geographical point, especially one of a pair.
2. Either of the two points where the Earth's axis of rotation meets its surface, i.e. the geographic poles, representing the northern and southern extremities of terrestrial latitude: the Geographic North Pole and the Geographic South Pole.
3. Either of the two ends of the geomagnetic field generated by the dynamo in the Earth's core. These ends may refer either to the true magnetic poles, known as the Magnetic North Pole and the Magnetic South Pole, which are not directly opposite each other, or to the antipodal poles of a hypothetical perfect dipole passing through the Earth's center, known as the Geomagnetic North Pole and the Geomagnetic South Pole.
pole of inaccessibility
A location that, with respect to a given geographical criterion, is the most difficult to reach according to that criterion, e.g. the geographical location that is the most distant from the nearest point meeting that criterion. The term most commonly refers to the so-called continental or oceanic poles of inaccessibility, i.e. the point on a given continental landmass that is the furthest distance from a coastline, and the point in the ocean that is the furthest distance from land, respectively.
political geography
The study of both the spatially uneven outcomes of political processes and the ways in which political processes are themselves affected by spatial structures. A sub-discipline of human geography, its primary concerns can be summarized as the relationships between people, state, and territory.
polje

A very large plain found in karstic regions, enclosed within a depression, usually elliptical, with a flat floor either of bare limestone or covered by alluvium, and generally surrounded by steep limestone walls; or more broadly any enclosed or nearly enclosed valley. The term is used primarily in the Slavic-speaking world.
polynodal
Many-centered; having many nodes.
polynya
An area of unfrozen seawater surrounded by an otherwise contiguous area of pack ice or fast ice. Polynyas are often formed along polar coastlines through the action of katabatic winds, but may also form in the open ocean.
pond
A natural or artificial body of standing water that is usually smaller than a lake.
populated place
A place or area with clustered or scattered buildings and a permanent human population (a city, settlement, town, or village) that is referenced with geographic coordinates.
population
A collection of organisms of the same group or species which live in a particular geographical area. In the context of geography, it often refers to a collection of humans and is represented at the most basic level as the number of people in a given geographically or politically defined space, such as a city, town, region, country, or the entire world.
population geography
A branch of human geography that studies the ways in which spatial variations in the composition, distribution, migration, and growth of populations are related to the nature of places. This often involves factors such as where populations are found and how the size and composition of these populations is regulated by the demographic processes of fertility, mortality, and migration.
positional error
The amount by which the mapped location of an imaged cartographic feature fails to agree with the feature's actual location in the real world.
positioning system
Any technology or mechanism used to determine the position of an object in space. Numerous methods for determining position have been practiced since ancient times, though modern positioning systems generally rely on electromagnetic and/or satellite-based technologies capable of providing coverage ranging from local or regional to global and accuracy ranging from tens of metres to sub-millimetre.
post-industrial
An economy that gains its basic character from economic activities developed primarily after manufacturing grew to predominance. Most notable would be quaternary economic patterns.
potamology
The branch of hydrology that studies rivers, including the processes and phenomena that occur at their sources, main channels, and mouths; the structure and morphology of drainage basins; and the water, thermal, ice, and sediment regimes that affect and are affected by river discharge.
potentiometric surface
See piezometric surface.
pothole

1. Any smooth, bowl-shaped or cylindrical hollow, generally deeper than it is wide, that is carved into the rocky bed of a watercourse such as a stream or river. Fluvial potholes are created by the grinding action of stones or coarse sediment kept in perpetual motion in the same spot by the turbulence of the current. The term is also used to refer to plunge pools beneath waterfalls, which are created by similar processes. See also kolk.
2. A vertical or steeply inclined karstic shaft in a limestone deposit.
3. In the Great Plains of North America, a shallow depression, generally less than 10 acres (4.0 ha) in area, occurring between dunes or on morainic relief on a prairie and often filled by an intermittent pond or marsh.
4. Another name for a kettle.
5. Another name for a panhole.
prairie
A type of temperate grassland ecosystem dominated by a characteristic composition of grasses, herbs, and shrubs, rather than by trees. The term is used primarily in North America, but similar ecosystems can be found across the world.
Precambrian rock
The oldest rocks, generally more than 600 million years old.
presque-isle
A peninsula connected to the mainland by an extremely narrow neck of land such that the land at its distal end is very close to being an island. See also tied island.
prevailing winds
The direction from which winds most frequently blow at a specific geographic location.
primary sector (primary economic activity)
That portion of a region's economy devoted to the extraction of basic materials (e.g. mining, lumbering, and agriculture).
Prime Meridian
The imaginary line running from north to south through the Royal Observatory in Greenwich, England which is assigned a longitude of 0 degrees and is therefore used as the reference point for all other lines of longitude.
proglacial
Preceding, in advance of, or in front of the toe or moraine of a glacier, either spatially or temporally.
progradation
The natural extension of a shoreline into a body of water by the gradual accumulation of sediment over time, especially as a result of fluvial sedimentation processes, such as the protrusion of a river delta into the sea. This occurs when the volume of sediment carried by the river and deposited at its mouth exceeds the volume lost through subsidence, sea level rise, or coastal erosion.
prominence
1. A conspicuous high point that projects above or beyond its surroundings, e.g. a butte or a promontory.
2. See topographic prominence.
promontory
A raised mass of land that projects into a lowland or a body of water. Compare headland and cape.
protected area
Any clearly defined geographic space in which human occupation or the exploitation of resources is limited or forbidden through legal or other effective means because of the area's recognized natural, ecological, cultural, or historical value.
province
A type of second-level administrative division within a country or federal state.
psychogeography
The study of specific effects of the geographical environment on the emotions and behaviors of individuals, whether consciously organized or not; the landscape of atmospheres, histories, attitudes, actions, and characters that occupy environments and influence group and individual psychologies.
public land
Any land area held and managed in the public domain by a federal or local government for use by the general public, as opposed to privately held land, for which access and use can be restricted by the individual landholder.
pueblo
A type of Indian village constructed by some tribes in the southwestern United States. A large community dwelling, divided into many rooms, up to five stories high, and usually made of adobe. This is also a Spanish word for town or village.
pull factor
In human geography, anything that encourages people to move or immigrate to a new place or location.
puna
An ecoregion in the central Andes Mountains of South America, or any of the various high-altitude ecosystems encompassing it, including cold deserts and alpine grasslands.
push factor
In human geography, anything that encourages people to leave or emigrate from a place or location.

== Q ==
quadrangle

A standard division of the Earth's surface area used in maps produced by the United States Geological Survey. Quadrangles are four-sided polygons of varying size, depending on the map series; for example, 7.5-minute quadrangles divide the mapped surface into quadrilaterals measuring 7.5 minutes (0.125 degrees) of latitude by 7.5 minutes of longitude, with each 7.5-minute map showing the topographical detail within one particular quadrilateral of this size. Because the boundaries of quadrangles are based on lines of latitude and longitude, the northern and southern limits of a quadrangle map are not straight lines, and the eastern and western limits are usually not parallel; the actual surface area covered by each map varies with the latitudes depicted.
quagmire
See bog.
quarry
A place from which stone, rock, sand, gravel, slate, or aggregate is excavated from the ground, especially a large man-made pit that is exposed to the open air.
quaternary sector (economic activities)
Activities focused on the management, processing, and research of information.

== R ==
raft ice
A jumbled mass of blocks of ice that impedes the flow of water in a river or stream.
rail gauge
The distance between the two rails of a railroad.
railroad bed
The track or trace of a railroad route, commonly raised slightly above the adjacent natural ground surface and constructed mostly of locally occurring, earthy materials (e.g. gravel and rock fragments).
rain shadow
An area on the leeward (downwind) side of a mountain or mountain range that receives greatly diminished precipitation.

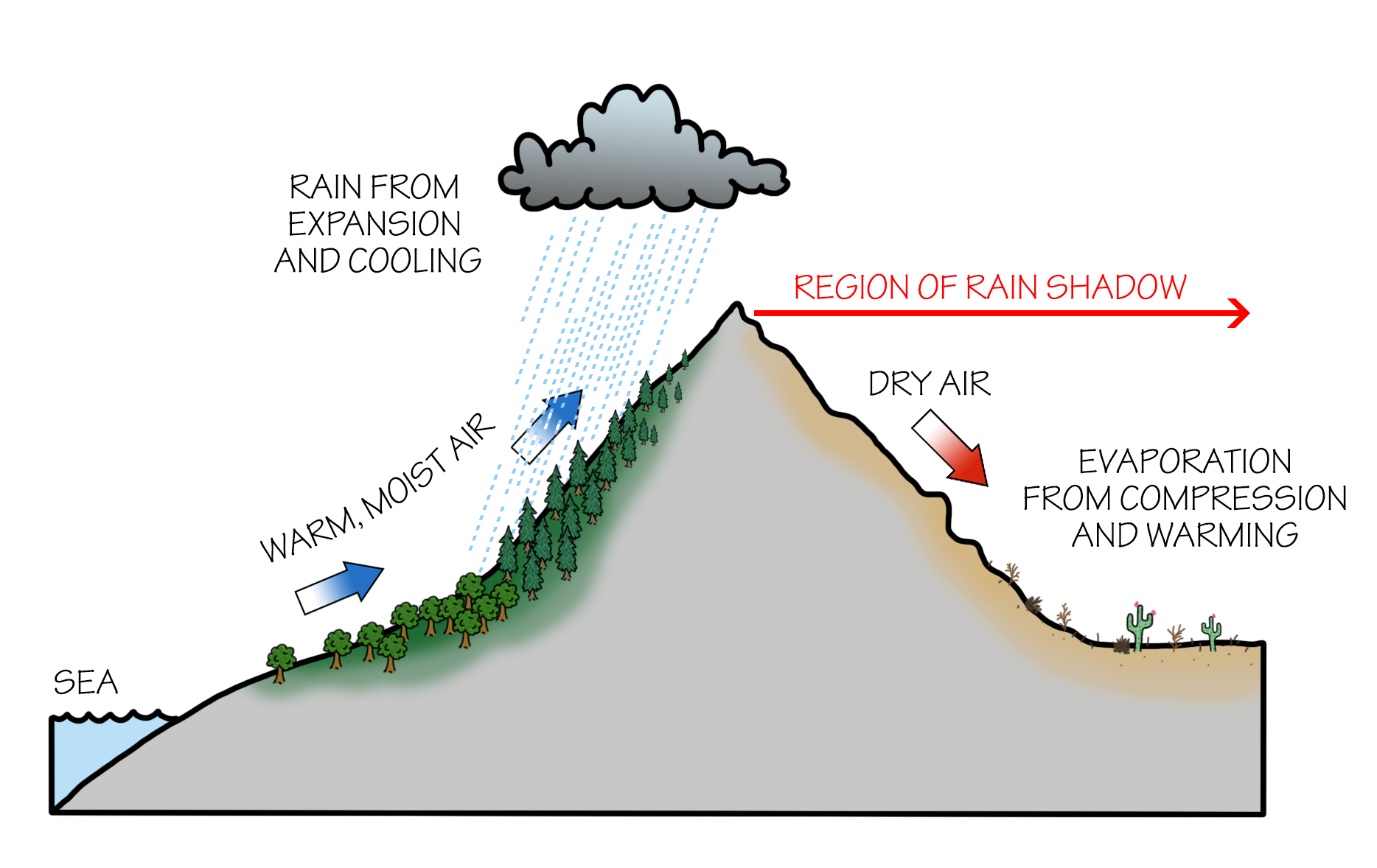
A rain shadow is created when a mountain range forces moist air masses upward, causing them to condense in the upper atmosphere and precipitate all of their moisture, which leaves them relatively dry by the time they reach the other side of the range.

rainforest
Any forest characterized by abundant rainfall, dense layers of vegetation, and extremely high biodiversity. Rainforests are found in both tropical and temperate regions. The term jungle is sometimes used to refer to a tropical rainforest.
rake
A sloping terrace on a mountainside or rock face. The term is used primarily in Scotland.
rapid

A section of a river or stream where the riverbed is sufficiently steep, the rate of flow is sufficiently fast, and/or the channel is sufficiently narrow or obstructed by shallow or protruding rocks or other obstacles that the water at the surface is visibly swift, turbulent, and broken, often forming large white-capped breaking waves, eddies, whirlpools, and "holes", in contrast to other sections where relatively slow, steady, laminar flows predominate. Rapids can persist long enough to form distinct, stable patterns at particular locations, though they are ultimately dependent on water volume and thus may change seasonally, disappearing entirely if water levels are too low or too high. Generally, watercourses are more likely to form rapids closer to their source, where channels are relatively shallow and narrow and often pass through mountainous or highly eroded terrain, than to downstream portions near their mouth, where channels tend to be deeper and wider.
raster
A representation of spatial data within a two-dimensional image that defines space as a rectangular array or grid of equally sized cells arranged in rows and columns, where each cell can be identified with location coordinates and is associated with attribute values containing a discrete amount of information from one or more layers or "bands". Raster models are useful for storing and presenting large amounts of complex multivariate data that vary continuously across space, as is commonly encountered in maps, aerial photographs, satellite imagery, and many other aspects of geographic information science. Raster data are contrasted with vector data, which instead store and represent geographic information in the form of points, lines, and polygons.
ravine
A fluvial slope landform of relatively steep sides, sometimes with an intermittent stream flowing along the downslope channel. Ravines are typically narrower and shallower than canyons, larger than gullies, and smaller than valleys.
reach
1. A relatively straight, level, uninterrupted segment of a stream, river, channel, or other watercourse, or of an arm of a sea or ocean, traditionally defined by its ability to be sailed in one "reach" (i.e. on a single point of sail, without tacking) and also usually implying a line-of-sight stretch of water between two bends or horizons, or between rapids, locks, stream gauges, or any other landmarks.
2. Any expanse or widening of a watercourse, natural or man-made (commonly on dammed streams and rivers), or even an expanse of land, especially one that appears to be visually contiguous.
3. In fluvial hydrology, a length of a stream or river having fairly uniform characteristics and which is therefore convenient to study as a discrete subdivision of the longer whole.
reclaimed land
1. Any land area that is artificially created from earthy fill material that has been intentionally placed and shaped so as to approximate natural contours, especially as part of land reclamation efforts such as those designed to bury tailings following the cessation of mining operations.
2. An area of land, commonly submerged underwater in its natural state, that has been protected by artificial structures such as dikes and drained for agricultural or other purposes (e.g. a polder).
reef
A submerged ridge-like or mound-like structure built by sedentary calcareous organisms, especially corals, in shallow marine waters, and consisting primarily of their skeletal remains, though often still supporting living colonies as well. Reefs may also be partially composed of rocks, sand, gravel, or seashells. They are locally prominent above surrounding sediments deposited on the sea floor, rising to or nearly to the water's surface.
re-entrant
See draw.
reference ellipsoid
A mathematically defined surface that approximates the geoid for use in spatial reference systems or geodetic datum definitions. Because of their relative simplicity, reference ellipsoids are used in geographic applications as preferred surfaces on which geodetic network computations are performed and point coordinates such as latitude, longitude, and elevation are defined.
reg
See desert pavement.
region
An area having some characteristic or characteristics that distinguish it from other areas; a territory that is of interest to people, for which one or more distinctive traits (e.g. climate, economy, history, etc.) define its identity.
regionalism
1. The feeling or expression of a common sense of identity, purpose, or group consciousness associated with a particular geographical region, e.g. the Southern United States, Scandinavia, or Lower Egypt, often combined with the creation of institutions that accommodate that particular identity and shape public action.
2. A movement to decentralize central government, placing administrative responsibility instead at a level intermediate between that of the state and that of smaller local or municipal units.
3. In architecture, an approach that strives to counter placelessness and lack of identity by incorporating elements of the building's geographical context in its design.
4. In linguistics, a word or phrase originating in, characteristic of, or limited in usage to a particular region.
regiopolis
A city located outside the core of a metropolitan area that serves as an independent driving force for political, economic, or cultural development within a larger region. Contrast metropolis.
register mark
A small cross-shaped symbol printed in multiple, overlapping colors at each corner of a colored map, used to indicate the accuracy of the printing of each color by the coincidence of the colored crosses on the completed print.
regolith
A layer of loose, unconsolidated, heterogeneous superficial deposits (e.g. soil, sediments, broken rock, volcanic ash, wind-blown material, etc.) overlying solid bedrock.
relative height
See topographic prominence.
relative relief
The elevation or altitude of one location relative to another location; the difference between the highest and lowest points within a given geographical area.
reliction

The gradual, long-term recession of a body of water such that submerged land features are uncovered and exposed above the surface; or the formerly submerged land itself.
relief
The actual physical surface of a region of the Earth, i.e. the specific shape, dimensions, and particularities of its terrain; or the deviation of a real-world surface from a reference surface such as the geoid, a sphere, or a plane. When only the patterns and contours of the natural surface are considered and man-made features are ignored, relief is more or less synonymous with topography.
relief map
See topographic map.
remote
(of a particular location) Isolated or inaccessible, either by being physically very distant from another location or by lacking connectivity to transportation or communication networks which would otherwise make exchange between locations convenient.
remote sensing
The gathering of information about an object or place from a remote location (i.e. without making physical on-site observations), most commonly by the use of satellite- or aircraft-based electromagnetic sensor technologies.
representative fraction (RF)
The fraction expressing the ratio between the distance measured between two points on a map and the corresponding actual distance measured between those points in the real world, used to indicate the map's scale. The fraction's numerator is typically 1 (indicating one of some specified unit of length, e.g. inches or centimetres) and the denominator is the number of the same unit in the real world which this length represents on the map. For example, a representative fraction of 1/1,000,000, often written as 1:1,000,000 or 1:1 mn, means that one inch (or one centimetre) on the map itself is equivalent to one million inches (or centimetres) in the real world. One statute mile is equal to 63,360 inches, so 1,000,000 inches is approximately 16 miles.
reservoir

An artificial lake or an artificially enlarged natural lake that is used to store water. Reservoirs are often created by the construction of a dam or lock in a natural drainage basin.
resource
Anything that is both naturally occurring and of use to humans.
retroreflector
rhumb line

A line drawn on the surface of a sphere (or on an idealized representation of the Earth) which crosses all meridians of longitude at the same angle, and which therefore has constant bearing relative to true or magnetic north.

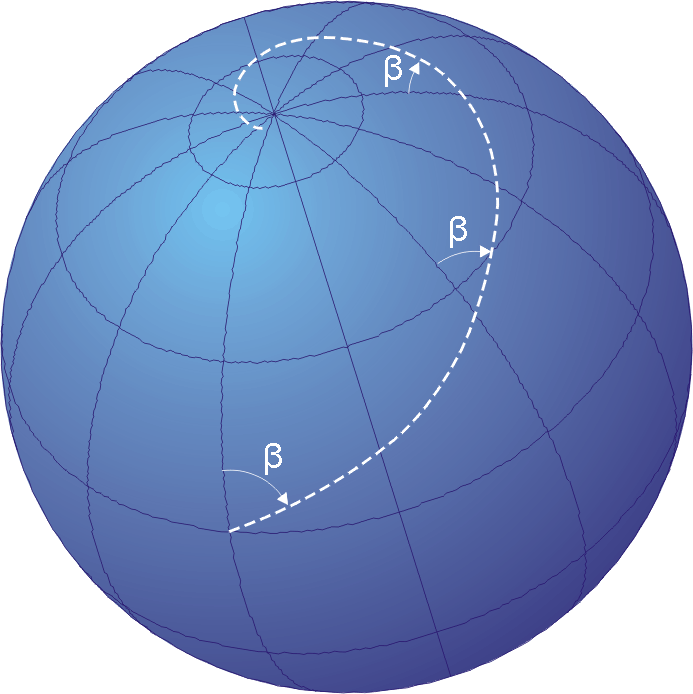
A rhumb line or loxodrome spirals toward the north pole of a sphere, crossing all lines of longitude at the same angle.

ria
The seaward end of a river valley which has been flooded as a result of a rise in sea level.
ribbon development
The build-up of residential and economic communities along the main routes of communication and transportation radiating from a city or other developed area, because of the advantages of accessibility, relatively inexpensive land, and trade from passers-by.
ribbon lake
A long, narrow, finger-shaped lake, especially one found in a glacial trough and dammed by a rock bar or moraine.
ridge
An elongated raised landform which forms a continuous elevated crest for some distance, such as a chain of hills or mountains. The line formed by the highest points, with only lower terrain immediately to either side, is called the ridgeline.
ridge and swale

A landscape characterized by a series of regularly spaced, parallel ridges or hills alternating with marshy depressions. They are most commonly formed on beaches or near river banks by the gradual fluctuations of tides or in association with scroll bars on the inside bends of meanders. See also berm and basin and range.
riegel
An outcrop of resistant bedrock that forms a bar across a glacial trough and often acts as a dam to impound the waters of a lake.
rift valley
A valley that has formed along a long, narrow continental trough bounded by normal faults; a graben of regional size.
rill
A shallow water channel, generally not more than 6 inches (15 cm) deep, that has been cut into a soil surface (especially a cultivated agricultural soil) by the erosive action of flowing water. Larger erosional channels may be called gullies.
rimaye
See bergschrund.
riparian rights
See water rights.
riparian zone

The area along the margins or banks of a river, stream, canal, estuary, or other watercourse; or the interface between land and a watercourse, generally including any land that is close enough to the watercourse to be frequently or persistently hydrated with its water. Riparian areas are important biomes with characteristics of both terrestrial and aquatic ecosystems, and often support dense hydrophilic plant communities of high biodiversity. They often overlap with and by some definitions may be considered wetlands.
river
A natural watercourse, usually fresh water, that flows towards an ocean, sea, lake, another river, or in some cases into an endorheic basin or an underground aquifer. See also stream.
river pocket
An area of land enclosed within the bend of a river, especially where the bend is extended or pronounced (e.g. a meander) and the only road access is along the isthmus. The term is used primarily in Australia.
riverine

Located on or inhabiting the banks or the area adjacent to a river or lake.
rivulet
A very small stream or brook, often intermittent or ephemeral; a streamlet.
road map

Any map that shows man-made roads, streets, highways, railways, and/or other transportation routes within a particular coverage area, especially one which prioritizes the display of this information over other information such as natural features. Road maps are designed to emphasize information relevant to motorists, often including road-use designations, political boundaries and labels, and points of interest such as tourist attractions, parks and recreational facilities, hotels, restaurants, gas stations, airports, and emergency services. The widths of the roads themselves are often exaggerated to make the routes more conspicuous.
roadstead
A body of water, natural or man-made, that is sheltered from rip currents, spring tides, and swells, and is therefore a known general station in which ships can safely be anchored without dragging or snatching.
rôche moutonnée
See sheepback.
rock mill
See pothole.
rose
A diagram printed on a map consisting of a set of lines radiating from a point and marked so as to indicate velocity or some other quantity having direction; e.g. a compass rose or current rose.
route
1. A way or course taken in getting from one place to another; an established or selected course of travel or action; a line of travel or means of access, especially when marked by a path, track, road, or rail.
2. A circuit traveled in delivering, selling, or collecting goods, e.g. by a mail carrier.
routefinding
The determination of a viable route or line of travel between two places, especially in rugged or unexplored areas such as mountainous terrain or in conditions of poor visibility, and especially when done without the benefits of prior knowledge of the area, maps, or other technology that might aid orienteering, instead relying entirely on recognition of natural features and landmarks and quick estimations of distance, scale, ease, and safety.
rural
An adjective describing any geographic area located outside areas of significant human population such as towns and cities; all population, housing, and territory not included within an urban area is often said to be rural. Rural areas are typified by low population densities, very small settlements, and expansive areas of agricultural land or wilderness.

== S ==
sabkha

A mudflat or sandflat in the supratidal zone of an arid or semiarid coastal plain in which large amounts of mineral salts accumulate; or, more generally, any flat area, coastal or interior, where salts or other evaporites readily precipitate at or near the land surface. The term is used primarily in Western Asia and Africa, though the landforms it describes occur worldwide. See also salt pan, salt marsh, and playa.
saddle
For a given pair of mountain summits, the region surrounding the elevational low point or col on the ridge connecting the two summits; mathematically, it is the critical point that is simultaneously a relative minimum in one axial direction (e.g. between the peaks) and a relative maximum in the perpendicular direction. Assuming it is navigable, a saddle can be thought of as the area surrounding the highest point on the lowest route which one could use to pass between the two summits.

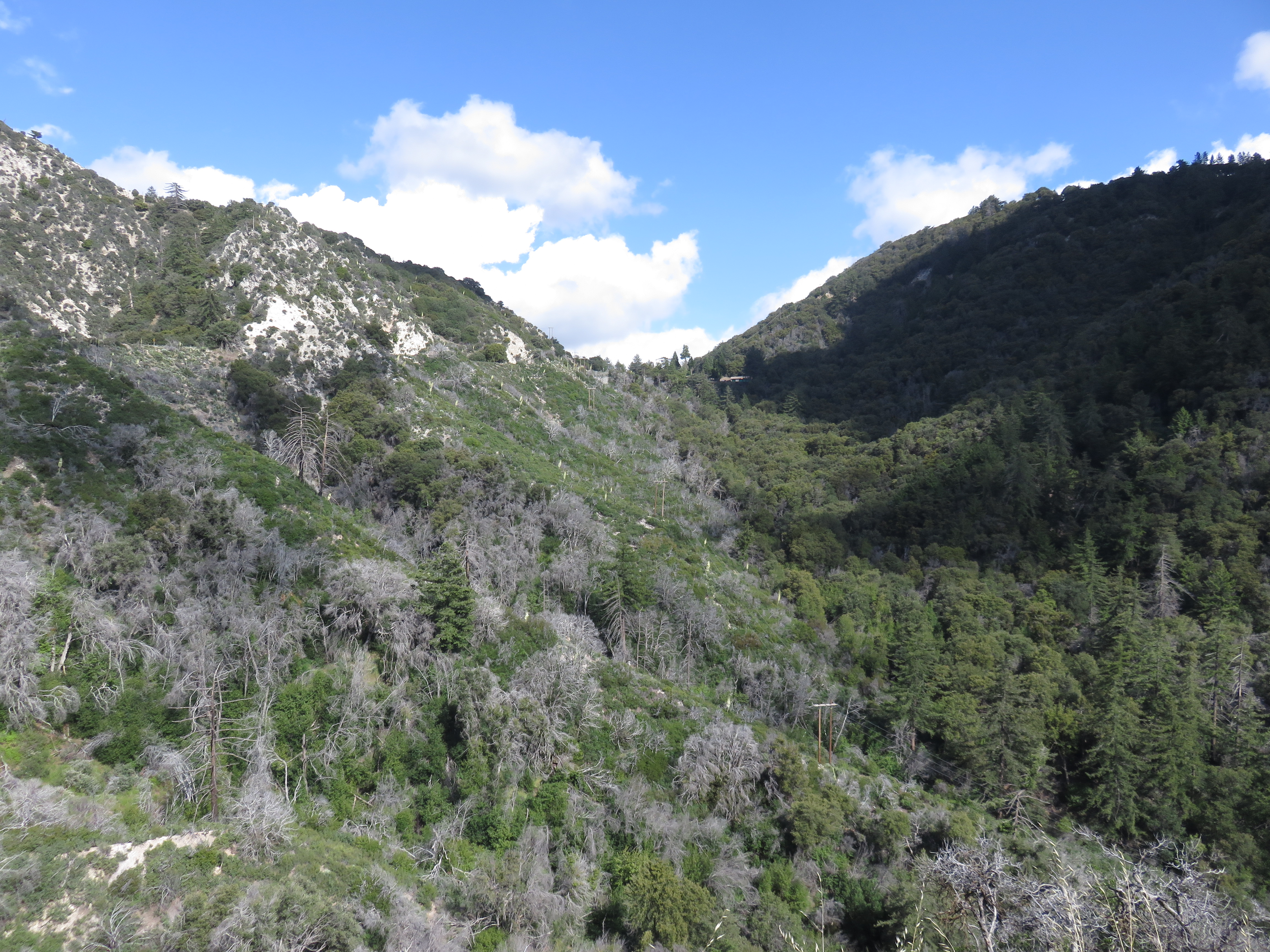
The saddle is the highest point of the pass between the two mountains.

salient

Any narrow, elongated protrusion of a larger territory, either physical or political, such as a state.
salt marsh

A natural coastal marsh ecosystem in the upper intertidal zone, between land and open seawater or brackish water, that is regularly flooded by the tide at high water. Salt marshes support dense stands of terrestrial salt-tolerant plants, especially grasses and low shrubs, which trap and bind sediments from the ocean and help protect the nearby shoreline from coastal erosion.
salt pan

A large, flat expanse of land naturally covered with mineral salts and/or other evaporites, usually to the exclusion of virtually all vegetation. Salt pans are common in deserts, where they form by the precipitation of dissolved mineral solids as a large body of water evaporates. See also playa.
saltwater

Any naturally occurring water, especially the water from a sea or ocean, characterized by high concentrations (between 3 and 5% by volume) of dissolved salts, primarily sodium and chloride ions, relative to fresh water or brackish water. Salt water in the Earth's oceans has an average salinity of about 3.5%; it is both denser and freezes at a lower temperature than fresh water.
sand dune
See dune.
sand sea
See erg.
sandbar
See shoal.
sandplain
A flat area where the soil or ground surface is covered with or composed of sand that has been transported from elsewhere and deposited by wind or oceans, rather than by weathering of the local bedrock.
sandur
See outwash plain.
satellite navigation

A method of navigation or an autonomous geospatial positioning system that relies on artificial satellites in orbit around the Earth to transmit time signals at radio frequencies along a line of sight to electronic receivers on the surface, which can then use this information to determine the receiver's location, direction, and the current local time to high precision. Satnav systems operate independently of telephonic or internet connectivity, though simultaneous use of these technologies can enhance the accuracy and usefulness of the positioning information generated.
satellite state
A formally independent state or polity which nevertheless depends economically, politically, or militarily upon, or is strongly influenced or controlled by, another, more powerful state.
savanna

A mixed woodland-grassland ecosystem characterized by scattered trees and bushes that are sufficiently widely spaced that the canopy does not close, permitting enough sunlight to reach the ground to support an unbroken herbaceous layer of primarily xerophytic grasses. The term is used especially to refer to the vast, hot, arid grasslands covering parts of equatorial Africa, South America, and northern Australia, but is also sometimes applied more broadly.
scale
1. The relationship between a linear measurement on a map and the distance it represents on the Earth's surface.
2. The level at which a geographical phenomenon occurs or is described.
scale dependency
The phenomenon by which geographic patterns, relationships, or statistical outcomes depend greatly on the spatial extent or resolution (i.e. the scale) at which they are observed.
scarp

A steep cliff face or slope terminating an elevated surface of low relief, formed either because of faulting or by the erosion of inclined rock strata.
schrund
See bergschrund.
scroll

1. A narrow stretch of floodplain added to the outer end and downstream side of spurs between enclosed meanders on a river.
2. A type of point bar consisting of a low, narrow ridge running in line with the curve of a meander, formed when the river overflows its banks.
sea
1. Any large body of salt water surrounded in whole or in part by land.
2. Any large subdivision of the World Ocean. "The sea" is the colloquial term for the entire interconnected system of salty bodies of water, including oceans, that covers the Earth.
sea lane

A navigable route across a wide waterway such as an ocean, sea, or large lake that is regularly used for maritime trade by large vessels or ships because it is safe, direct, and economical.
sea level
The average level of the surface of one or more of Earth's oceans from which heights such as elevation and altitude are commonly measured. Often called mean sea level (MSL), it is a type of standardized geodetic vertical datum that is used in numerous applications, including surveying, cartography, and navigation. Mean sea level is commonly defined as the midpoint between the mean low and mean high tides at a particular location.
sea stack
See stack.
seabed

The bottom of a sea or ocean. As with land terrain, the ocean floor may have ridges, mountains, valleys, and plains.
seaboard
Any extensive region of land adjacent to the sea, broadly synonymous with coast or coastline.
seamount
A mountain (often a volcano) rising from the ocean floor whose summit does not reach the water's surface and which is therefore entirely submerged and not an island or islet.
search space
In human geography, the locations within an area where an individual or group searches for the resources necessary to meet their specific needs (e.g. for housing or employment), based on information from their current awareness space.
seaway
See sea lane.
second home
A seasonally occupied dwelling that is not the primary residence of the owner. Such residences are usually found in areas with substantial opportunities for recreation or tourist activity.
secondary-intercardinal directions
The set of eight intermediate directions used in cartography and navigation, each of which is located halfway between a pair of intercardinal directions: north-northeast (NNE), east-northeast (ENE), east-southeast (ESE), south-southeast (SSE), south-southwest (SSW), west-southwest (WSW), west-northwest (WNW), and north-northwest (NNW). They may or may not be explicitly labeled on a compass rose.
secondary sector (secondary economic activity)
That portion of a region's economy devoted to the processing of basic materials extracted by the primary sector; i.e. to the production of material goods.
sector principle
The principle on which political claims to territory in the polar regions have historically been made, such that the territories are divided into arbitrary wedge-shaped sectors, each one having an apex at the geographic pole and including outer areas of both land and sea extending to a particular latitude. Because of the limited accessibility and generally low material value of both the Arctic and Antarctic, the sector principle has emerged as a means of formally sharing responsibility for these regions between the world's sovereign states.
sector theory

The view that commercial, industrial, and especially residential areas in a city develop in 'sectors' or districts along lines of transport and communication, from the central business district outwards. In many urban areas the basic pattern of development often approximately follows this model, with industrial sectors developing along canals and railways, working-class housing developing near industrial sectors, and higher quality housing being built away from industrial zones but still in places with quick and convenient road access to other sectors.
sedimentary rock
Rock formed by the hardening of material deposited in some process; most commonly sandstone, shale, and limestone.
seismograph
A scientific instrument that detects and records vibrations (seismic waves) produced by earthquakes.
selva
A dense equatorial forest, especially in the Amazon basin of South America.
sense of place
Either the intrinsic character of a place or the meaning people give to it, or a mixture of both. This sense of meaning may include national, regional, or local identity or awareness, or emotional attachments formed between humans and the places they reside in or travel to. It is often the intangible characteristics of a particular place which are most important to mental representations of that place; these characteristics may be natural and unintentional, or may be consciously created or preserved through memorable or singular structures in order to give a place a distinctive identity.
serac

A large block or pillar of glacial ice formed by the intersection of numerous crevasses where the glacier fragments as it reaches a steep slope. Seracs are usually found in icefalls, often in large numbers, in mountainous terrain.
settlement

Any place where people live and form communities; an inhabited or populated place. Settlements vary widely in size and complexity, from small clusters of dwellings to huge cities and metropolitan areas.
settlement pattern
The spatial distribution of where humans inhabit the Earth.
shaded relief
A type of relief mapping in which terrain features are drawn with colors proportional to their elevation or degree of slope, such that the shading of higher or steeper terrain is darker or lighter than the shading of lower or flatter terrain. This gives the map the illusion of three-dimensional relief, as if the depicted landforms were creating shadows due to illumination from an off-map light source.
shadow effect
The phenomenon by which a large, well-served urban center affects the transport services of a nearby smaller town or city, often by drawing producers and consumers away from the smaller settlement and toward the larger one, causing the smaller settlement to be relatively ill-provided with direct services.
shakehole
See doline.
shallows
An area of water of relatively little depth, e.g. in a sea, lake, or river.
sheepback

A rock formation created by the passage of a glacier over underlying bedrock, which often results in asymmetrical erosional forms created by abrasion on the upstream side of the rock and plucking on the downstream side.
shelf sea
A relatively shallow marginal sea, generally less than 300 metres (980 ft) deep, beneath which a portion of a continental shelf is submerged.
shield
A broad area of very old rocks above sea level that is usually characterized by thin, poor soils and low population densities.

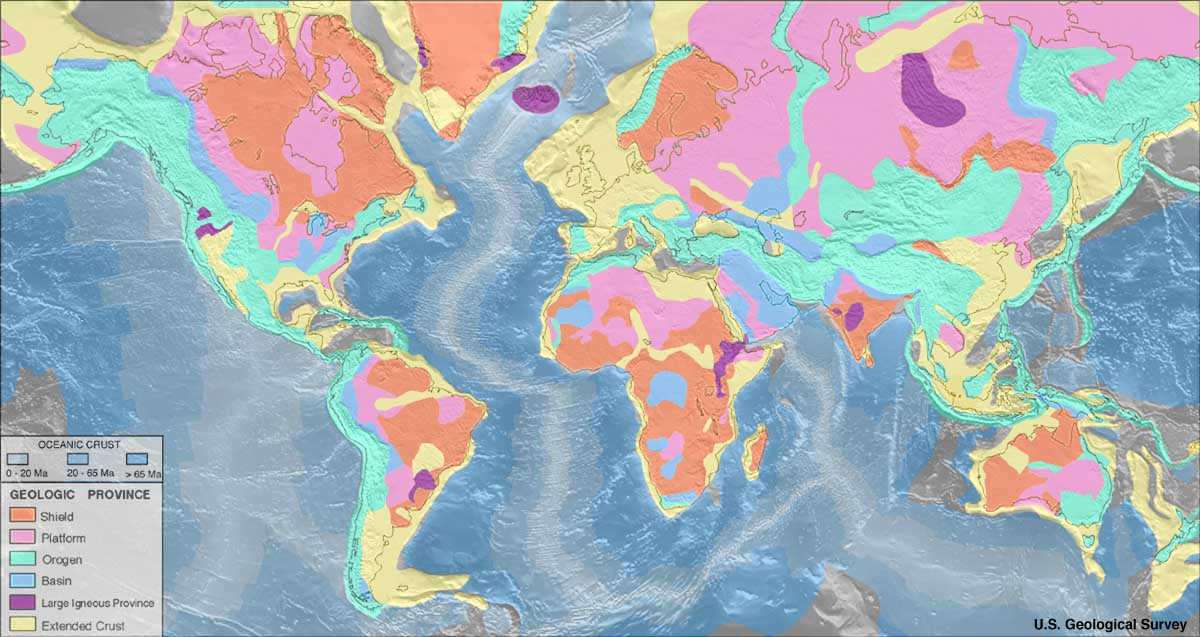
Shields—large areas of the Earth's crust which are relatively inactive tectonically (here depicted in orange)—are found in the interior of every continental plate.

shield volcano
A class of volcano that resembles an inverted warrior's shield, with long gentle slopes produced by multiple eruptions of fluid lava flows.
shoal

A natural submerged ridge, bank, or bar that consists of or is covered by sand or other unconsolidated material and rises from the bed of a body of water to just below or above the surface.
shore

The fringe of land at the edge of a large body of water, such as an ocean, sea, or lake. Compare coast.
shore platform
See wave-cut platform.
shoulder
1. A rounded spur on a mountainside; or a bench on the side of a glacier-deepened U-shaped valley, demarcating an abrupt transition between the gentle upper slopes which have been largely unaffected by glacial erosion and the steep lower slopes of the heavily eroded inner valley.
2. The part of a roadway between the edge of the graded or paved driving surface and the top of the foreslope of an adjacent ditch or embankment.
shoulder drop
See topographic prominence.
side valley
A valley whose mouth opens onto a larger, lower-order valley to which its drainage is tributary.
sighting compass
A handheld magnetic compass fitted with a sighting device that permits the user to accurately determine the bearing or azimuth of a specified target with respect to their own position. The sighting instrument may make use of a simple notched protrusion akin to a gunsight, an image of the target reflected in a mirror, or a prismatic or lensatic system.
sinkhole
A crater formed when the roof of a cavern collapses, usually found in areas of limestone rock.
site
The features of a place related to the immediate environment in which the place is located (e.g. terrain, soil, subsurface, geology, groundwater, etc.).
situation
The features of a place related to its location relative to other places (e.g., accessibility, hinterland quality).
skerry
A small, rocky islet or reef, often one of a series lying just offshore and parallel to the main trend of the coastline, over which large waves may break at high tide or in stormy weather.
sky island
An isolated mountain, mountain range, or high plateau characterized by conspicuous elevational gradients in geology, climate, and/or biodiversity, so that environments and ecosystems near the summit differ greatly from those of the adjacent slopes or the surrounding lowlands. This effectively cuts off the ecosystems of the highest areas, turning them into "islands" in a "sea" of dissimilar landscapes.
slack
A shallow hole or hollow among coastal sand dunes or mud banks.
slack water

The brief period of time during which a body of water susceptible to tides is completely unstressed because the tidal stream is almost still, i.e. there is no movement in either direction in the tidal current, usually occurring twice daily at the high and low water marks prior to the tide reversing direction.
slant range
The line-of-sight distance along the relative direction between two points, especially two points which are not at the same elevation relative to a specific datum. If the two points are at the same elevation, the slant range equals the horizontal distance.
slash
1. In the southeastern United States, a low-lying swampy or boggy area, overgrown with shrubs and cane grasses and favorable for the growth of the slash pine and related trees.
2. The debris of felled trees, especially in a forest that has been subjected to slash-and-burn agriculture.
slide
1. A noticeable track of bare rock or furrowed earth left by the mass movement of soil, mud, snow, or rock under shear stress down a steep slope, as in a landslide or avalanche.
2. The mass of material moved or deposited by such an event, and which has become fixed or settled upon the landscape.
slip-off slope
The more gently sloping of the two banks of a river or stream, usually on the inside bend of a meander, as opposed to a cut bank.

Cross-section of a meandering river: uneven currents result in asymmetrical channels with a gently sloping depositional bank, known as a slip-off slope, on the inside of each bend and a steep erosional bank, known as a cut bank, on the opposite side.

slope
The upward or downward inclination of a natural or artificial surface (e.g. a hillside or a road), or the degree or nature of such an incline; a deviation from the perpendicular or horizontal direction (these directions generally being assigned with respect to the direction of the force of gravity). See also grade.
slough
A type of wetland – usually a swamp, a shallow lake, or a backwater branching from or feeding into a river – in which water tends to be stagnant or flows only very slowly on a seasonal basis.
slum
A residential settlement or neighborhood associated with extreme poverty and overpopulation, usually in or near an urban area. Slums are characterized by densely packed and poorly built or dilapidated housing units and a deterioration or lack of civic infrastructure such as reliable water, electricity, sanitation, law enforcement, and other basic services.
smog
A mixture of particulate matter and chemical pollutants which has accumulated in the lower atmosphere, usually over urban areas.
smooth sheet

A sheet on which field control and hydrographic data such as soundings, depth curves, and regions surveyed with a wire drag are plotted or drawn during the creation of a hydrographic chart.
snout

The lowermost margin or extremity of a glacier, always either gradually advancing or retreating, sometimes partially hidden by morainic material, and commonly featuring a cave from which meltwater flows.
snowline
The lowest elevation at which snow remains throughout the year if the summer warmth does not completely melt the winter accumulation, e.g. on a high mountain. This elevation varies widely with latitude, local climate, directional aspect, and steepness of slope, such that the snowline may be very different on different mountains in the same range, on different faces of the same mountain, or on the same face in different years.
social trail
See desire path.
society
A group of people living in an organized community.
soil building process
The creation of organic matter from weathered rock, air, and water.
soil horizon
A distinct layer of soil which can be distinguished from other layers in vertical cross-section.
solstice
The time when the Sun reaches its most northerly or southerly excursion relative to the celestial equator on the celestial sphere. Two solstices occur annually, around 20–22 June and 20–22 December. In many countries, the seasons of the year are defined by reference to the solstices and the equinoxes.
solution pan
See panhole.
solubility
The degree to which a substance can be dissolved in another substance. In a geographical context, solubility is a characteristic of soil minerals that describes their tendency to be carried away in solution by water. See also leaching.
sound
1. A large inlet of a sea or ocean that is larger than a bay, deeper than a bight, and wider than a fjord.
2. A narrow sea or ocean channel between two landmasses.
sounding
1. A measured depth in water, usually a measurement of the distance from an instrument on a vessel at the surface to the bottom of the bed or floor of the body of water at a point directly below the vessel; or the process by which such a measurement is made. In very shallow water, depths may be measurable by mechanical devices such as long sounding poles that make physical contact with the bottom; in deeper water, accurate determination of depth usually relies on a lead-line or the return of sonar echoes. Depth sounding is fundamental to bathymetry.
2. A specific depth of water referred to a datum (e.g. a tidal datum) given in the legend of a hydrographic chart.
3. A point on a map where the measured value of the depth of a body of water at that point is explicitly shown.
South Geographic Pole

The point in the Southern Hemisphere where the Earth's axis of rotation meets its surface. It is the southernmost point on Earth, directly opposite the North Geographic Pole, and is located on continental land in Antarctica at a latitude of 90 degrees South; its longitude can be assigned any degree value. See also South Magnetic Pole.
South Geomagnetic Pole

The point in the Southern Hemisphere where the axis of a theoretical simplified dipole passing through the center of the Earth would intersect the Earth's surface. It is antipodal to the North Geomagnetic Pole. Because of the fluid nature of the Earth's molten core, the true axis of the Earth's magnetic field is not a perfect dipole, and so the Geomagnetic Poles and the actual Magnetic Poles lie some distance apart.
South Magnetic Pole

The point in the Southern Hemisphere at which the Earth's magnetic field points vertically downward. It is close to but distinct from the Geographic South Pole and the Geomagnetic South Pole, and its precise location varies considerably over time due to frequent magnetic changes in the Earth's core. Its counterpart in the Northern Hemisphere is the North Magnetic Pole, though the two poles are not directly opposite each other.
Southern Hemisphere
The half sphere of the Earth that is south of the Equator. It is opposite the Northern Hemisphere.
space economy
The locational pattern of economic activities and their interconnecting linkages.
spatial analysis
1. Any of the wide variety of formal techniques used to study entities according to their topological, geometric, or geographic properties.
2. An approach to geography in which the locational variations of a phenomenon or a series of phenomena are studied and the factors influencing or governing the observed patterns of distribution within space are investigated. This approach attempts to break down spatial patterns into simple elements so that measurements can be made of individual sub-patterns, which then allows the comparison of two or more distinct patterns and the development of statistical tests to determine whether a given pattern differs significantly from random variation.
spatial citizenship
The participation of individuals and groups of laypeople in decision-making about spatial planning and social rules in public spaces through the reflexive production and use of geographic media such as maps, virtual globes, and GIS software, particularly to question existing perspectives on the appropriation of space and the actions permitted within that space and to negotiate alternative spatial visions.
spatial complementarity
The occurrence of location pairing such that items demanded by one place can be supplied by another.
spatial diffusion
The process by which materials, ideas, diseases, or information are distributed or spread through space.
spatial interaction
Movement or exchange between locationally separate places.
spatial reference system (SRS)

A coordinate-based local, regional, or global system used to locate geographical entities and which defines a specific map projection as well as transformations between different systems.
spatial science
The measurement, management, analysis, and display of spatial information describing geographic spaces, including both natural and socially constructed features. Spatial science emphasizes the study of aggregate spatial patterns, including spatial behavior, within theoretical frameworks and by using quantitative methods to evaluate models and hypotheses. It is an interdisciplinary field combining elements of and overlapping with cartography, geodesy, hydrography, surveying, photogrammetry, remote sensing, and geographic information science.
spatiality
The effects of geographic space on actions, interactions, entities, perceptions, and ideas.
spatiomap
A map that is not merely a diagrammatic representation of a place but is based on an aerial orthophotograph, such that the map includes actual imagery of ground-level features which are often omitted from conventional maps. Spatiomaps are usually created by overlaying annotations directly upon an orthophoto, such as a north arrow or compass rose, a scale bar, political boundaries and labels, or other cartographical information. They are useful when reliable data from ground-based surveys are missing for a particular geographical area or when accurate maps must be produced very quickly, especially during disaster relief efforts where a natural disaster has dramatically changed ground-level detail but new surveys have not yet been conducted.
spirit level
spit

A type of bar or shoal extending from a beach into an ocean or lake and which develops by the deposition of sediment as a result of longshore drift. Spits form where the shoreline sharply changes direction, such as at a headland, and often develop a "hooked" or recurve shape at their distal ends.
spot elevation

A point on a map or chart whose height or elevation above a specified reference datum (often mean sea level) is explicitly annotated, usually by a numerical elevation value printed immediately adjacent to a dot or sawbuck indicating the point itself. Topographic maps often include spot elevations, wherever practicable, for the summits of hills, mountains, plateaus, and buttes; mountain passes; forks and intersections of roads, trails, and waterways; water surfaces of lakes and ponds; notable low points such as the local elevational minimum of a basin; very large flat areas; and any other point which may be of interest to the map user.
spreading ridge
See mid-ocean ridge.
spring
Any location where groundwater naturally emerges from an underground aquifer to the Earth's surface.
spur
A lateral ridge or other salient landform protruding from the side of a hill, mountain, or the main crest of a ridge and typically surrounded on at least three sides by steep hillsides.
stack

A coastal landform consisting of a steep and often vertical column or columns of rock above the surface of the sea and formed by erosion due to wave action. See also pinnacle.
stage

In hydrology, the height of the surface of a stream or river at a particular location and a particular point in time, with respect to a reference height such as its bed or a position on its banks, and used especially to monitor seasonal changes in discharge and flooding.
stand
An area of vegetation dominated by a single plant species, e.g. a stand of oak trees.
Standard Metropolitan Statistical Area (SMSA)
A statistical unit used in the United States consisting of one or more counties that focus on one or more central cities larger than a specified size, or with a total population larger than a specified size.
state
A compulsory political organization with a centralized government that maintains a monopoly of the legitimate use of force within a certain geographical territory. See country.
stateless society
A society that is not governed by a state; there is little concentration of authority. Most positions of authority that do exist are very limited in power, and they are generally not permanent positions, and social bodies that resolve disputes through predefined rules tend to be small.
steilhang
A steep mountainside, hillside, or escarpment, especially one with an average incline between 30 and 60 degrees from the horizontal. The term is used primarily in the German-speaking world.
steppe
An ecoregion characterized by expansive grassland plains without trees apart from those near rivers and lakes.
stopbank
See levee.
stoss
An adjective describing the side of a hill or ridge that faces the direction from which an advancing glacier or ice sheet is moving or has moved; i.e. facing upstream or "up-ice" with respect to the glacier, and therefore most exposed to its abrasive action. The opposite side, facing downstream or away from the glacier, is known as the lee.
strait
See channel.
strandline
A beach or shoreline, especially a former or relict one, now elevated above the present water level, which appears as a bench or other visible demarcation lining the length of the shore at a common elevation. See also high water mark.
strath
A large river valley, typically wider and shallower than a glen. The term is used primarily in Scotland, Australia, and Canada.
stratovolcano

A steep-sided volcano built by lava flows and tephra deposits.
stream
A natural body of water in which surface water flows between the banks of a channel. Long, large streams are called rivers.
stream order

The hierarchical classification of all of the branching streams comprising a river system or watershed, usually by assigning an ordinal number to each individual tributary indicating the magnitude of its channel and/or its position within the overall drainage sequence. Several different numbering methods are in common usage. In the Strahler system, the outermost tributaries (i.e. near the sources) are designated first-order streams, and at least two streams of any given order must combine to form a stream of the next higher order, e.g. two first-order streams unite to form a second-order stream, two-second-order streams join to form a third-order stream, and so on until the largest channel or main stem, terminating at the mouth, is reached.

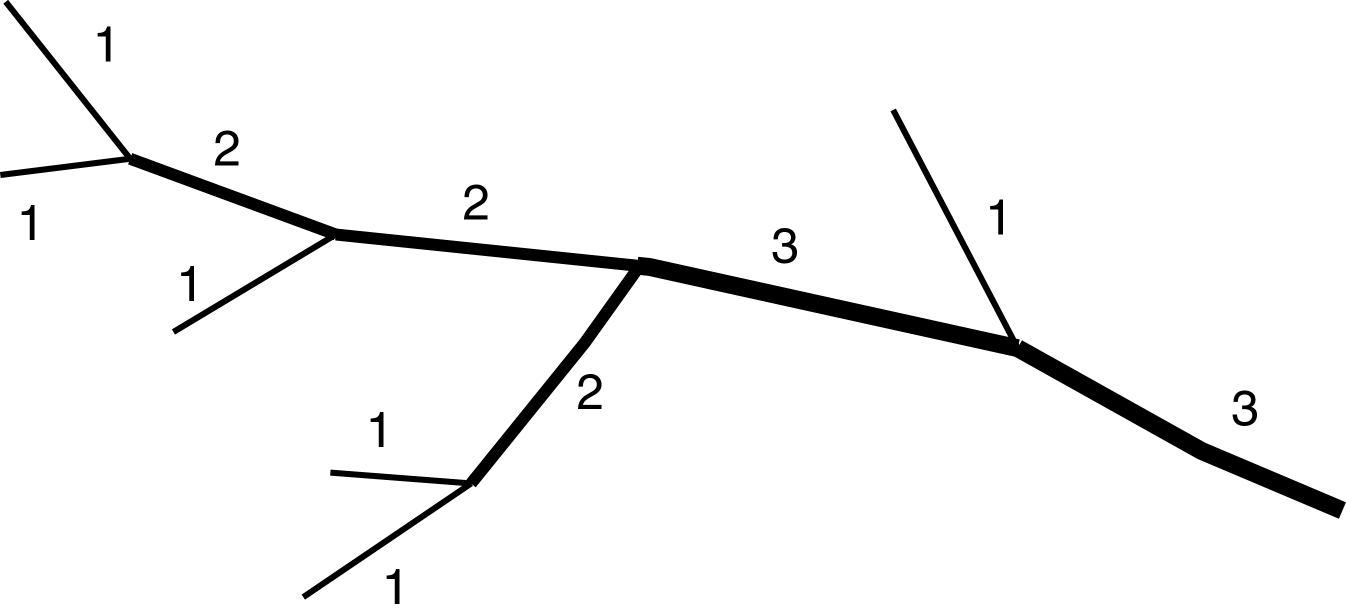
The Strahler stream order system for assigning numbers to streams

streambed

The bottom of the channel of a stream or river, usually covered with rocks, sand, or debris and totally devoid of terrestrial vegetation if the stream has flowed recently. The bed is generally considered the part of the channel up to the normal water line, whereas the bank is the part above the water line.
streamlet
A very small stream, smaller and less voluminous than a brook or creek, and often intermittent or ephemeral. See also rill and rivulet.
strike
The direction of the line of intersection between an imaginary horizontal plane and the plane of a geological stratum, fault, or hillslope. Strike is usually combined with dip in describing the orientation of a geographical surface.
strip map
A map covering only a narrow band of territory in which the user is interested, e.g. alongside each side of a trail or vehicle route.
subcontinent
A large landmass forming a contiguous part of an even larger continent, though often separable by physiographic or political boundaries, e.g. the Indian subcontinent; or a non-contiguous but still very large landmass that is smaller than one usually termed a continent, e.g. Greenland.
subduction zone
The place where two lithospheric plates come together, one riding over the other. Most volcanoes on land occur parallel to and inland from the boundary between the two plates.
subglacial
Of, relating to, or formed on or by the underside of a glacier. Contrast englacial and superglacial.
sublittoral
1. Of or relating to the coastal area of the sea between the intertidal zone and the edge of the continental shelf. Compare littoral zone.
2. Of or relating to the deepest parts of a lake or other large body of freshwater, distant from the shore, where plants cannot root. See also aphotic zone.
subsequent
(of a stream, river, or any natural water flow) Flowing along a course determined by the structure of the local bedrock. Contrast consequent and obsequent.
subsistence farming (agriculture)
A farming practice where a family produces only enough food for their own family and not to sell or export.
suburban
An adjective describing a mixed-use or residential area existing either as an ancillary part of an urban area or as a separate community within commuting distance of a city; a place of this type is called a suburb. Suburbs are often defined by commuter infrastructures and have lower population densities than inner-city neighborhoods.
suburbanization
The process by which a human population shifts from urban to suburban residency, or the gradual increase in the proportion of people choosing to live in suburban neighborhoods which act as satellite communities within commuting distance of larger, centralized urban areas. Suburbanization is inversely related to urbanization.
summit

A point on a surface that is higher in elevation than all points immediately adjacent to it. Mathematically, it is a local maximum in elevation. The highest point of a hill or mountain is often referred to as the summit.
superglacial

Of or relating to the surface or to the environment at the surface of a glacier. Contrast englacial and subglacial.
supranational region
A region composed of several countries working together for either political, economic, or social purposes, e.g. the European Union.
surf zone

The area along a shoreline in which breaking waves routinely form, between the furthest seaward limit at which incoming waves begin to break and the furthest landward extent reached by the uprush of swash on the beach. The extent of the surf zone may change with the tide and local weather conditions.
surface water
Water present on the surface of the Earth, such as in a river, lake, wetland, or ocean, as opposed to subsurface water.
survey marker
surveying
The science, technique, and profession of determining the terrestrial or three-dimensional positions of points on the surface of the Earth and the distances and angles between them. These points are often used to draw maps and establish boundaries for property ownership, construction projects, and other purposes required by civil law.
swale
Any shallow channel or trough with gently sloping sides, either natural or artificial. Man-made swales are often designed to manage surface runoff and increase rainwater infiltration.
swallet
See ponor.
swamp
A forested wetland, often occurring along a large river or on the shores of a large lake.
swell
1. The regular, undulating motion of the surface of a large body of water, e.g. of the ocean; the succession of surface waves in the open ocean which, though they may grow very large, do not break.
2. A rise or uplift on the deep sea floor.
3. Any dome-shaped landform, often a plateau or other geological uplift, covering a very large area.
swirlhole
See pothole.
syncline
synekism
syrt
A denudational highland or elevated flatland in Russia and Central Asia; a kind of dissected plateau.

== T ==
table

A butte, plateau, or highland with a relatively flat, often expansive summit area. See also mesa.
tablemount
See guyot.
taiga
A moist subarctic coniferous forest that begins where the tundra ends and is dominated by spruces and firs.
tailings

Waste materials left over after the mining and processing of ore, during which a valuable mineral or metal is extracted from the uneconomic fraction accompanying it; the latter plus any substances applied in the extraction process are then discarded, often in spoil piles or ponds near the mine, usually because it is prohibitively expensive or impossible to relocate, reuse, or otherwise destroy the discarded material. Mine tailings are distinct from overburden, which is displaced during mining but not processed, and are often nutrient-poor or toxic to living organisms, making it difficult for plant and animal life to reclaim the environs without further treatment.
talik
A layer of year-round unfrozen ground between or within layers of permafrost, or between the active layer and permafrost.
talus
Loose, broken rock fragments of any size and shape, usually coarse and angular, derived from and lying at the base of a cliff or a very steep rock slope. Large quantities tend to accumulate on the slopes of high mountains by falling, rolling, or sliding from an eroding rockfall source. Compare scree.
talweg
See thalweg.
tank
A small man-made pond or reservoir created by impounding a stream or by constructing a pit or basin to collect and hold rainwater or snowmelt. Less commonly, the term may also refer to a natural pond or basin.
tarn

A mountain lake or pool of water formed in a cirque excavated by a glacier. A moraine may form a natural dam below a tarn.
tectonic forces
The physical processes involving the movement of the Earth's crust.
tectonic plate
Any of several very large divisions of the Earth's crust consisting of solid rock which "floats" on top of the semi-solid mantle.
temperate zone
Traditionally, either of the two mid-latitude regions of the Earth defined by their latitudinal position between the tropics and the polar zones, i.e. the region between latitudes 23°30' N and 66°30' N, or that between 23°30' S and 66°30' S. In modern usage, the term may refer instead to regions of mild or temperate climate, regardless of latitude.
temperature inversion
An increase in temperature with height above the Earth's surface, a reversal of the normal pattern, often observed in deep valleys and basins that are mostly or entirely enclosed by high mountain ranges.
tephra
Solid material of all sizes explosively ejected from a volcano into the atmosphere.
terminal moraine

A moraine that forms at the terminus or snout of a glacier, marking its furthest advance. Debris transported by plucking and abrasion accumulates at the glacier's leading edge, where it is deposited in an unsorted pile of sediment as the ice begins to retreat.
terracette
One of a series of regularly spaced, horizontal, step-like ridges forming a distinctive ribbed pattern on a steep and usually grassy hillside, similar to an agricultural terrace or lynchet but naturally occurring. Various explanations for their origins have been suggested, including soil creep, solifluction, and animal trampling.
terrain

The vertical and horizontal dimensions of a land surface, usually as expressed in terms of elevation, slope, and orientation of geographical features.
terrane
A fragment or block of the Earth's crust which forms on one tectonic plate but becomes accreted or "sutured" to the crust of another tectonic plate, such that the fragment's distinctive geological history differs markedly from that of surrounding areas. The suture zone between a terrane and the crust it attaches to is usually delimited by faults.
terrestrial
1. Consisting of, living on, or relating to land, as opposed to water or air; e.g. a terrestrial animal lives primarily on land surfaces rather than in the sea.
2. On, of, or relating to the Earth, as opposed to other planets or to celestial phenomena occurring outside the Earth's atmosphere.
territorial waters
1. A concept of the Law of the Sea defined as the belt of coastal waters extending no more than 12 nautical miles (22 km) from a designated baseline (usually defined as the mean low-water line) for a coastal state and regarded as the sovereign territory of the state; or more generally any area of water over which a state has legal jurisdiction, including internal waters, the exclusive economic zone, and potentially others.
territory
A specific area or portion of the Earth's surface, especially one claimed or administered by a particular country; similar to though distinct from a region.
tertiary economic activity (tertiary sector)
That portion of a region's economy devoted to service activities (e.g. retail and wholesale operations, transportation, and insurance).
thalweg

The line of lowest elevation within a valley or watercourse, i.e. the line defining the longitudinal profile of an area with respect to the path followed by water draining from the area. Thalwegs are significant in political geography because borders along rivers are often defined by the river's thalweg. This has sometimes led to conflict because the river's course may change naturally over time.

The line connecting the points of maximum depth along a river's course is known as its thalweg.

thaw lake
A shallow, rounded lake or pond occupying a depression resulting from the melting of ground ice or permafrost, ubiquitous in thermokarst regions wherever there are flat lowlands with silty alluvium and high ice content, including much of the North American and Siberian Arctic. Many thaw lakes develop elongate shapes oriented with the long axis at a right angle to the prevailing wind.
theodolite
An optical instrument consisting of a small telescope, a spirit level, and graduated arcs mounted on a tripod, used in surveying and other applications to precisely measure angles between designated visible points in the horizontal and vertical planes.
thermal spring
See hot spring.
thermal stratification
The tendency of bodies of water such as lakes to separate into distinct thermal layers along a vertical gradient, such that water temperature varies predictably with increasing depth. Stratification is typically a seasonal phenomenon, exemplified in deep lakes at temperate latitudes during the summer, which often form a warm, turbulent upper layer near the surface, a colder bottom layer, and a transition zone of rapidly decreasing temperature in between. In all but the deepest lakes and oceans, these layers often disappear entirely in the spring and fall, when convective mixing makes the temperature more or less uniform at all depths, and may even invert if the surface freezes during the winter. Local topography, wind patterns, and dissolved solutes also strongly influence the formation and disruption of stratified waters.
thermocline
A thin layer of water in an ocean or lake, typically between the non-circulating hypolimnion and the warmer epilimnion, through which temperature changes more drastically with depth than it does in the layers above or below; e.g. temperature may decrease much more rapidly with increasing depth in this layer, commonly exceeding 1 °C (1.8 °F) per metre of descent.
thermokarst
A type of terrain characterized by expansive landscapes of small hummocks interspersed with irregular, marshy depressions formed by the thawing of ice-rich permafrost. The unique landforms of thermokarst, including pingoes, palsen, thaw lakes, alases, and linear and polygonal troughs, result from various periglacial and thermo-erosional phenomena common in the Arctic and on a smaller scale in mountainous areas such as the Himalayas and the Alps.
tholoid
A volcanic cone occurring inside of a larger volcanic crater or caldera.
throw
The vertical displacement of strata or rocks across the line of a fault, varying from a few millimetres to hundreds of metres in height. Those rocks on the higher side of the fault are termed upthrow, while those on the lower side are termed downthrow.
tidal creek

A narrow inlet or estuary that is affected by the ebb and flow of tides from an adjacent ocean. Water in the lower portions of these channels tends to vary greatly in depth, salinity, electrical conductivity, and other hydrological properties over the course of the tidal cycle, but is often slow-moving and rich in organic sediment drained from upstream freshwater sources, making them important habitats for many species.
tidal flat
An extensive, nearly horizontal, and barren or sparsely vegetated tract of land at the edge of a sea or ocean that is alternately covered and uncovered by the tide.
tidal prism
The total volume of water that flows in and out of a coastal inlet or estuary with each cycle of the tides, excluding any freshwater discharges; i.e. the difference in the inlet's volume between the mean high and low tides.
tidal range
The difference in height between high tide and low tide at a given location. This range may vary over the course of the year, e.g. during neap tides and spring tides.
tide
The periodic rise and fall of sea levels caused by the combined effects of the gravitational forces exerted by the Moon and the Sun and the Earth's rotation.
tide pool
A shallow pool of seawater, supplied regularly by incoming tides, that forms on a rocky intertidal shore.
tied island

An island that is connected to a mainland only by a narrow spit or tombolo which may or may not be occasionally submerged.
till
See glacial till.
timberline
See tree line.
time distance
A measure of how far apart places are in terms of the amount of time it takes to travel between them (how long does it take to travel from place A to place B?). This may be contrasted with other distance metrics such as geographic distance (how far is it?) and cost-distance (how much will it cost to get there?).
time geography

An interdisciplinary perspective, ontological framework, and visual language in which space and time are used as basic dimensions of analysis of dynamic processes and events, including social and ecological interactions, environmental changes, and biographies of individuals.
time zone
A region of the globe that observes a uniform standard time for legal, commercial, and social purposes. Most time zones span about 15 degrees of longitude, and in each of these divisions the mean solar time at an arbitrarily selected meridian (usually one near the longitudinal center of the division) is made the standard time across the entire zone. Time zones tend to follow political boundaries between countries and their subdivisions, however, rather than strictly following the same meridian, because it is convenient for areas in frequent communication to keep the same time.
Tissot's indicatrix

A mathematical contrivance used to illustrate the linear, angular, and areal distortions that result when projecting information from a curved three-dimensional geometric model such as a globe onto a two-dimensional map. A single indicatrix is traditionally a circle of determinate size drawn upon the surface of the globe, with center at specific coordinates; the extent to which this circle is deformed when the globe's coordinates are transformed onto a flat two-dimensional map makes apparent the nature of the distortion affecting nearby map features, such as the size and shape of landmasses, which might otherwise be difficult to visualize. Because distortion can vary greatly across a map, it is common for multiple indicatrices to be depicted at multiple points on the map, e.g. at major intersections of meridians and parallels.

The Behrmann projection overlaid with Tissot's indicatrices of distortion. The red circles are all the same size and shape; when projected onto the map with the rest of the coordinates, the deformation of a particular circle into an ellipse shows the direction and magnitude to which scale is distorted at that particular point on the map.

toe
See snout.
toeslope
toll road

A public or private road or highway for which a fee or toll is charged to drivers for passage.
tombolo
A sandy or shingle-covered spit, bar, or isthmus connecting an island to the mainland or to another island (thereby forming a tied island).
topocide
topographic isolation
The minimum great-circle distance between the summit of a mountain or hill and a point of equal elevation, representing a radius of dominance in which the summit is the highest point.

Summit B's topographic isolation is the horizontal distance between the summit and the nearest point of equal elevation (about halfway up Summit A). Summit B's topographic prominence is the vertical height between the summit and the lowest contour line that completely encircles it but no higher summit (at the col between Summit B and Summit C).

topographic map

A map that uses contour lines to represent the three-dimensional features of a landscape on a two-dimensional surface.
topographic prominence

A measure of the independence of a mountain or hill defined as the vertical distance between its summit and the lowest contour line completely encircling it but containing no higher summit within it; or, equivalently, the difference between the elevation of the summit and the elevation of the key col. Mountains with high prominence tend to be the highest points in their vicinity.
topographical relief
See terrain.
topography
The physical features of a place, or the study and depiction of physical features, both natural and man-made, including terrain relief.
topological map
A type of diagrammatic map which depicts the actual positional relationships between certain features but on which true scale is distorted and unnecessary detail is absent to accommodate other considerations (e.g. simplicity so as to aid understanding of a complex communications network or public transit system).

Schematic route maps for public transit systems are examples of topological maps: this tube map of the London Underground and several other passenger railways shows connectivity – i.e. the way in which the various lines connect particular stops and stations, which is the information most relevant to people riding the lines – but is not concerned with correctly depicting the orientation of the stations and is not drawn to scale.

topology
In geographical studies, a discipline concerned with the mathematical analysis of enclosure, order, connectivity, contiguity, and relative position rather than with actual distance and orientation. Topological relationships are commonly expressed in terms of networks and depicted with topological maps.
toponymy
The study of placenames (known as toponyms), their origins, meanings, use, and typology.
tor

A prominent, free-standing rock outcrop that rises abruptly from the smooth slopes of a gently rounded hill or ridge. In the United Kingdom, the term is also used to refer to the hill itself.
town
A medium-sized human settlement that is generally larger than a village but smaller than a city, though the criteria for distinguishing a town vary considerably in different parts of the world.
township
A type of populated place or administrative subdivision for which definitions vary widely between jurisdictions. In the United States, the township is the basic unit of land in the Public Land Survey System, a quadrangle with sides of approximately 6 miles (9.7 km) aligned to parallels and meridians and further subdivided into 36 one-square-mile sections. The location of each township is specified with respect to a designated reference parallel and a reference meridian.
township and range
The rectangular system of land subdivision used to plat real property for sale and settlement in much of the agriculturally settled United States west of the Appalachian Mountains, established by the Land Ordinance of 1785.
towpath
A road or path alongside a navigable river, canal, or other inland waterway designed to allow land vehicles, draught animals, or a team of human pullers to tow a boat or barge.
trafficability
The capacity of a soil or of a particular type of terrain to permit the movement of vehicles or pedestrians.
trail
transferability
The extent to which a good or service can be moved from one location to another; the relative capacity for spatial interaction.
transhumance
The seasonal movement of people and animals in search of pasture. Commonly, winters are spent in snow-free lowlands and summers in the cooler uplands.
transverse
Crosswise; lying across; crossing from one side to another, as a line on a map.
transverse coast
See discordant coastline.
transverse dune
A sand dune with its crest oriented at right angles to the direction of the prevailing wind, as opposed to the orientation of a longitudinal dune.
transverse valley
A valley which cuts across a ridge or mountain range at right angles to the primary orientation of the crest. Contrast longitudinal valley.
trap street
In cartography, a misrepresented or nonexistent road or street that is deliberately included on a map (often outside the map's nominal area of coverage) for the purpose of detecting plagiarism by acting as a copyright trap: plagiarists who have copied other cartographers' work would find it difficult to explain the inclusion of the trap street on their map as coincidental. For this reason trap streets are often inconspicuous and given unique names. Many other map features are also used as copyright traps, including natural features and entire towns, and the implementation may also involve mislabeling features such as topographic elevations as well as making subtle stylistic alterations such as exaggerated or nonexistent bends in roads or rivers, ideally in a way that does not interfere significantly with navigation.
traverse
1. In surveying, a line or route and the sequence of points on it at which observations or measurements are made, or the process by which such a sequence is established. The term may also refer more generally to any route or path traveled for any purpose.
2. A relatively horizontal route taken so as to bypass obstacles when the primary goal is to move vertically, as in rock climbing and mountaineering.
tree line

The latitudinal or elevational limit of normal tree growth. Beyond this limit (i.e. closer to the poles or at higher elevations) climatic conditions are too severe for such growth and trees are stunted or entirely absent. The term cold timberline may also be used to emphasize that the limiting factor is temperature, particularly when distinguishing it from the dry timberline of arid regions, where tree growth is instead limited by the availability of water.
triangulation
The process of determining the location of a given point or object, especially its distance from an observer, by measuring only the angles to it from two known points along a common baseline, which represent two vertices of an imaginary triangle. The unknown point can then be fixed as the third vertex of the triangle, using the one known side and two known angles. Triangulation differs from trilateration, which measures distances to the point directly instead of angles.

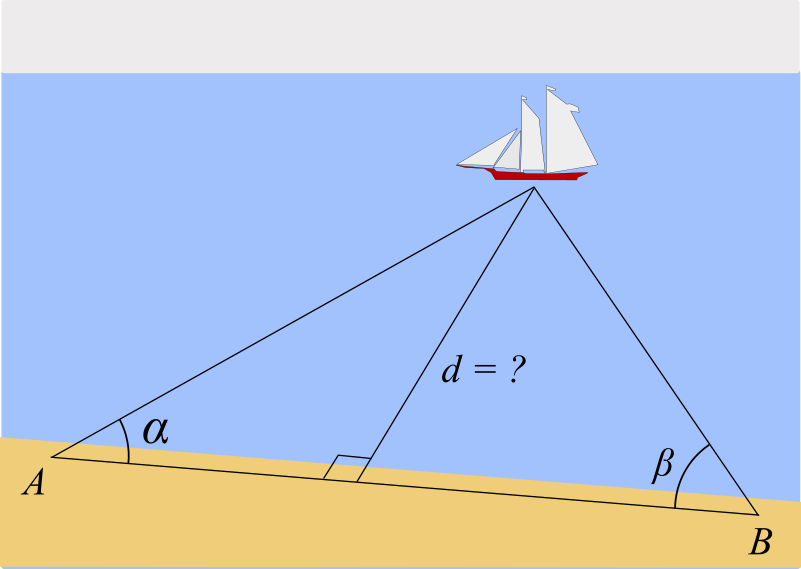
By measuring the angles a and b and the length of side AB, the distance to the ship, d, can be triangulated using trigonometry.

tributary

A stream or river that flows into a larger stream or main stem or a lake, rather than directly into a sea or ocean. Contrast distributary.
trilateration
The process of determining the location of a given point or object by measuring only the distances to it from a sufficient number of other points; in particular, a method of surveying in which the location of one point relative to two or more others is determined by measuring the distances between all points (either ordinary Euclidean distances or great-circle distances). When more than three distances are involved, the process may be called multilateration. Measurement of direction and angle is not strictly necessary for trilateration, though this information is often used in tandem with trilateration data.
tropic
Either of the two parallels of latitude marking the boundary of the tropics: the Tropic of Cancer and the Tropic of Capricorn.
Tropic of Cancer
The northernmost circle of latitude on the Earth at which the Sun appears directly overhead at its culmination, which lies approximately 23.4 degrees north of the Equator. Its southern equivalent is the Tropic of Capricorn.
Tropic of Capricorn
The southernmost circle of latitude on the Earth at which the Sun appears directly overhead at its culmination, which lies approximately 23.4 degrees south of the Equator. Its northern equivalent is the Tropic of Cancer.
tropical
Characteristic of, located in, or relating to the tropics, either the specific parallels of latitude or the zone lying between those two parallels.
tropics

The region of the Earth's surface surrounding the Equator and bounded by the Tropic of Cancer (23.4° N latitude) and the Tropic of Capricorn (23.4° S latitude). It is characterized by high annual precipitation and the absence of any significant seasonal variation in temperature. The term is often used more broadly to describe any area possessing what is considered a hot, humid climate, regardless of latitude. See also temperate zone and polar zone.
trough
Any elongated, generally U-shaped valley, ravine, basin, or ditch, natural or artificial, dry or wet. Particularly common usages refer to a submarine trench or deep in the ocean floor, or to a geological syncline.
true north

The direction along the Earth's surface towards the Geographic North Pole. Geodetic true north differs from magnetic north and grid north, and also very slightly from astronomical true north, which is based on the direction of the north celestial pole.
true south

The direction along the Earth's surface that is exactly opposite (i.e. bearing 180 degrees) of true north, towards the Geographic South Pole.
trunk
See main stem.
tsunami
A giant ocean wave caused by an underwater earthquake or volcanic eruption with great destructive power.
tundra
A treeless plain characteristic of the Arctic and subarctic regions.
tunnel valley
A deep, greatly elongated, U-shaped valley carved from land beneath a mass of glacial ice, often near the margin of a continental ice sheet. Tunnel valleys may be up to 100 kilometres (62 mi) long, 2.5 kilometres (1.6 mi) wide, and 400 metres (1,300 ft) deep, and often occur side-by-side in a series of multiple parallel valleys.
turlough
In western Ireland, a depression or sinkhole which fills with water when the water table rises, e.g. by tidal effects.
turnpike
See toll road.
tuya
A subglacial landform consisting of a flat-topped, steep-sided volcanic mountain formed when lava erupts beneath an overlying glacier or ice sheet and melts through the ice to the surface, where it pools and solidifies into a level bed of volcanic rock; the glacier continues to gradually erode the surrounding landscape and, upon retreating, leaves behind a characteristic mesa-like rock formation.

== U ==
umland
An area which is culturally, economically, and politically related to a particular town or city.
underfit stream
A misfit stream that is seemingly too small to have eroded the valley or passage through which it flows, often an indication that there was once a larger stream in its place. Contrast overfit stream.
underpopulation
Economically, a situation in which an increase in the size of the labor force will result in an increase in per-worker productivity.
uniform region
A territory with one or more features present throughout which are absent or unimportant elsewhere.
uninverted relief
Topographic surface relief which closely reflects the shape and orientation of the underlying geological structure, i.e. where hills and ridges coincide with anticlines and valleys with synclines. Contrast inverted relief.
Universal Transverse Mercator (UTM)
upland

Any area of land that is higher in elevation relative to another area, especially one that is populated by low hills or situated atop a plateau. The term is often used as a conditional descriptor to distinguish related habitats or ecosystems, especially freshwater riparian areas, on the basis of elevation above sea level. Upland areas are usually characterized by relatively fast-flowing waterways and hilly or rocky terrain. Contrast lowland.
upstate
urban
An adjective describing a settlement with a high population density and a developed infrastructure of built environment; places of this type are variously categorized as cities, towns, or conurbations, or simply called urban areas. Contrast suburban, exurban, and rural.
urban geography
The sub-discipline of geography that derives from the study of cities, urban processes, and the built environment.
urban sprawl
The unrestricted growth of housing, commercial development, and roads (typically of low densities) over large expanses of land, usually within or near an existing urban or suburban area and with little concern for civic planning. It is often considered a type of urbanization and almost always carries negative connotations.

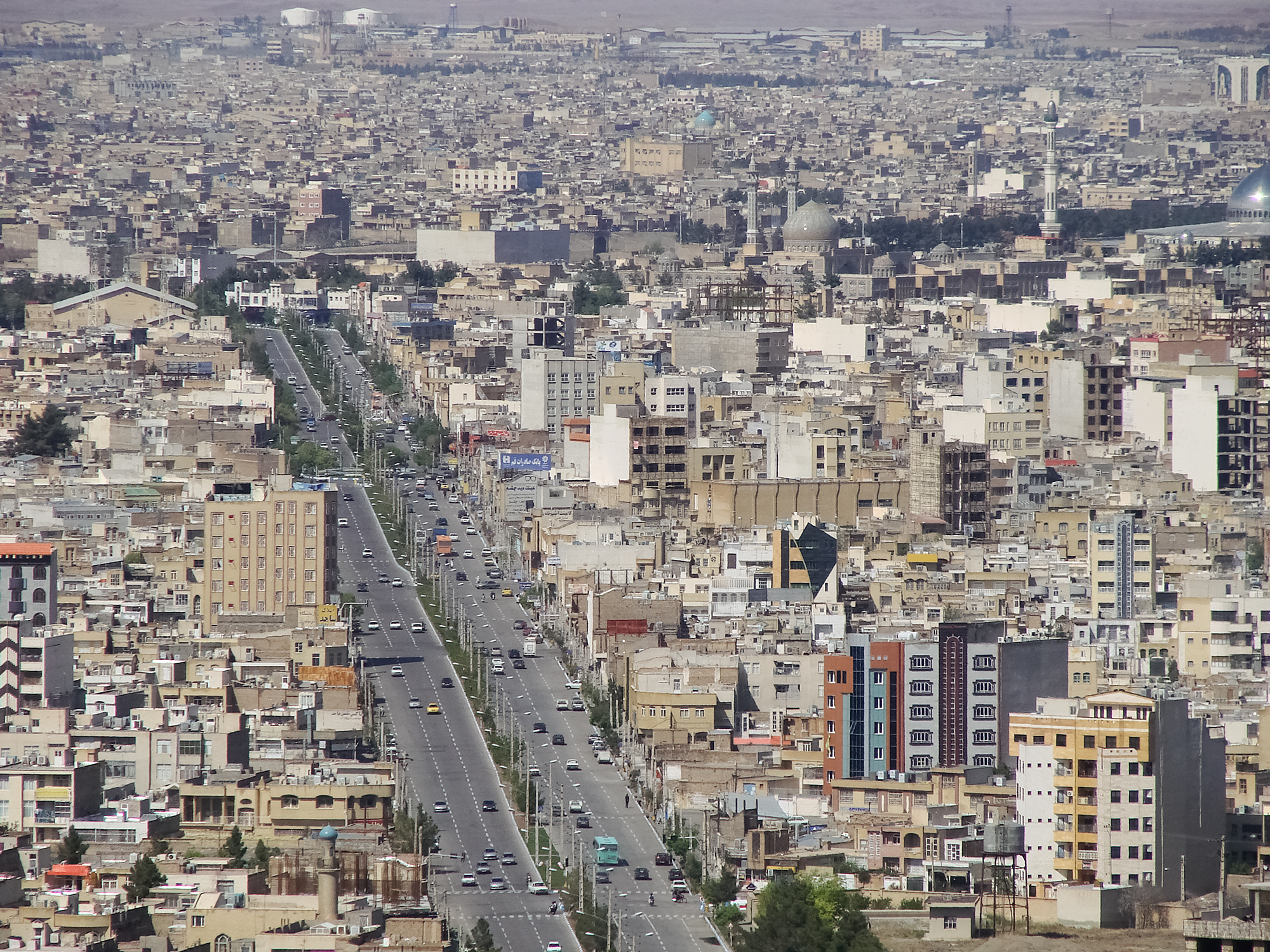
Urban sprawl in the city of Qom, Iran

urban studies
The study of the development of cities and urban areas, especially from historical, architectural, or civic planning perspectives.
urbanization
The process by which a human population shifts from rural to urban residency, the gradual increase in the proportion of people living in urban areas such as towns and cities, and the ways in which human societies respond and adapt to this change. Urbanization may be characterized as a specific condition at a set time (e.g. the proportion of the total population or physical area within a given set of towns or cities) or as an increase in that condition over time. It precipitates enormous social, economic, and environmental changes for the planet as a whole.

== V ==
vale
Another name for a valley.
valley

1. A low area between hills or mountains, often with a river running through it.
2. A depression that is longer than it is wide.
veld
See bushveld.
vent
An opening at the Earth's surface through which volcanic materials (lava, tephra, and gases) erupt. Vents can be at a volcano's summit or on its slopes; they can be circular (craters) or linear (fissures).
vertical exaggeration
A scale used in certain maps, such as raised-relief maps, that deliberately distorts the apparent elevation of the map's topography to emphasize vertical features, which might otherwise appear too small to identify relative to the corresponding horizontal scale.
viewshed
The geographical area that is visible from a particular location. It includes all surrounding points within line-of-sight of the location and excludes points beyond the horizon or obstructed by terrain and natural or artificial objects.
village
A small, clustered human settlement or community, usually larger than a hamlet but smaller than a town and often in rural areas, though the criteria for distinguishing a village can vary considerably in different parts of the world.
virtual globe
A computer-generated three-dimensional software model or representation of Earth or another planet, providing the user with the ability to freely move around in the virtual environment by changing the viewing angle and position, and also to map many different types of data upon the modeled surface, such as land use statistics, meteorological records, and demographic quantities. An example is Google Earth.
volcanic avalanche

A large, chaotic mass of soil, rock, and volcanic debris moving swiftly down the slopes of a volcano. Volcanic avalanches can also occur without an eruption due to an earthquake, heavy rainfall, or unstable soil, rock, and volcanic debris.
volcanic crater
A type of crater created by volcanic activity, typically shaped like a bowl and containing one or more volcanic vents. Compare caldera.
volcano
A vent or opening in the Earth's surface through which magma erupts, or the landform that is constructed by the eruptive material.
volcanology

The scientific study of volcanoes, lava, magma, and the body of related geophysical phenomena known as volcanism. It is a branch of geology and Earth science which seeks to understand the formation, activity, and dormancy of volcanoes, their current and historic eruptions, and how to predict them.
vrtače
See doline.

== W ==
wadi
1. A dry, ephemeral riverbed which contains water only when heavy rainfall occurs.
2. Another name for a valley, used primarily in Arabic-speaking parts of the world.
warping
1. The slow, gentle deformation of the Earth's crust over a wide area, resulting in a raising or lowering of the surface.
2. (sedimentation) Any process, natural or artificial, whereby the low-lying land of a tidal estuary is flooded, leading to deposition of silt, mud, or clay.
wash
1. The surging movement of the sea or any other large body of water; another name for the swash of a breaking wave.
2. An area of sand and mud submerged or wettened during high tide and exposed during low tide.
3. A dry streambed or gully; an arroyo.
4. Another name for a washland.
5. The collection of fine, granular material that is moved down a slope by erosional processes. See also wash slope.
wash margin
wash slope
See gravity slope.
washland

A low-lying area of unused or undeveloped land adjacent to a river or stream, often within a natural floodplain, which is deliberately flooded when the water is high in order to prevent developed residential or agricultural areas from flooding. Washlands are thus sacrificed as a form of flood control, and may simultaneously function as wetlands and wildlife refuges.
waste land

1. Wild, uncultivated, uninhabited land, especially that which is barren or desolate, supporting little or no plant and animal life, such as is found in some deserts.
2. Land that yields little or no return when used for agriculture.
3. Any land, common or otherwise, that was previously cultivated or developed but is now abandoned, and for which further use has yet to be found. See also brownfield land.
water column
In hydrology and oceanography, a conceptual column of water extending from the surface of an ocean, lake, or river to the sediment of the floor or bed, used to aid interpretation of properties and processes that vary along a depth gradient.
water gap
A low point or opening in a ridge or mountain range carved by the erosional activity of flowing water and through which water continues to flow in the present day. Contrast wind gap.
water mapping

The collection and presentation of point data related to the distribution, status, and sustainability of water supplies, generally by overlaying these data on a map showing administrative boundaries and population data, which can help to visualize and predict coverage issues and inform water management practices.
water pollution
The contamination of water by chemical or biological constituents which make it unfit for use.
water table
The level below the land surface at which subsurface material such as permeable rock is fully saturated with groundwater. The depth of the water table reflects the minimum level to which wells must be drilled for groundwater extraction; a spring, marsh, or lake results wherever the theoretical water table lies above the level of the land surface. The level of the water table is the boundary between the vadose zone and the phreatic zone, below which the ground is fully saturated. In many places its depth fluctuates seasonally, which accounts for the intermittent flow of bournes. In some circumstances, there may be no regular water table; in others, a perched water table may exist.

The position of the water table tends to vary with terrain as well as seasonally.

water-meadow
A low-lying area of grassland beside a natural stream or river, subjected to periodic flooding through controlled irrigation to increase agricultural productivity, typically via a series of man-made canals or drains connected to the stream or river.
waterbody
See body of water.
watercourse
Any channel followed by a flowing body of water such as a river or stream, potentially including channels that are dry for part or all of the year.
waterfall

An abrupt and steep or perpendicular descent in a watercourse, e.g. in the bed of a river, resulting in a significant volume of water tumbling vertically downward or even freely falling by the pull of gravity. Waterfalls occur where the water's normally more level flow is interrupted by a nearly horizontal layer of hard rock overlying more easily eroded soft rock, or by the sharp edge of a plateau, or by the steep rock faces of a hanging valley, coastal cliff, or any other escarpment or knickpoint. They may be permanent or ephemeral; many alpine waterfalls form seasonally on mountainsides as snow and ice melts during the summer.
waterhole

A hollow or depression in the ground, natural or artificial, in which water can collect, either from precipitation or fed by a spring, especially in savannas or deserts where water is otherwise scarce; or a pool in the bed of an intermittent stream. Waterholes may be permanent or ephemeral.
watershed
Another name for a drainage divide, or for the entire catchment area of a drainage basin.
waterway
Any body of water that is deep, wide, and slow enough to be navigable by watercraft.
wave-cut platform

A flat erosion surface along the shore of a lake, bay, or sea that is formed by the undercutting and eventual collapse of a sea cliff as a result of repetitive wave action.
waypoint
A reference point in physical space used for purposes of navigation, especially when plotted on a map or in a GIS application as part of a traveled route.
weathering
The breaking of rocks into smaller rocks, gradually becoming soil.
weir

A man-made obstruction built across the width of a river that alters its flow and usually results in a change in the height of the river level, commonly by permitting water to flow freely over a low barrier before cascading down to a lower level. Weirs may serve many purposes, including decreasing or increasing the force of the current, maintaining water depth, or diverting or impounding flow, typically for navigation, irrigation, fishing, to generate a head for a water mill, or to control outflow from a lake or reservoir. Compare dam and barrage.

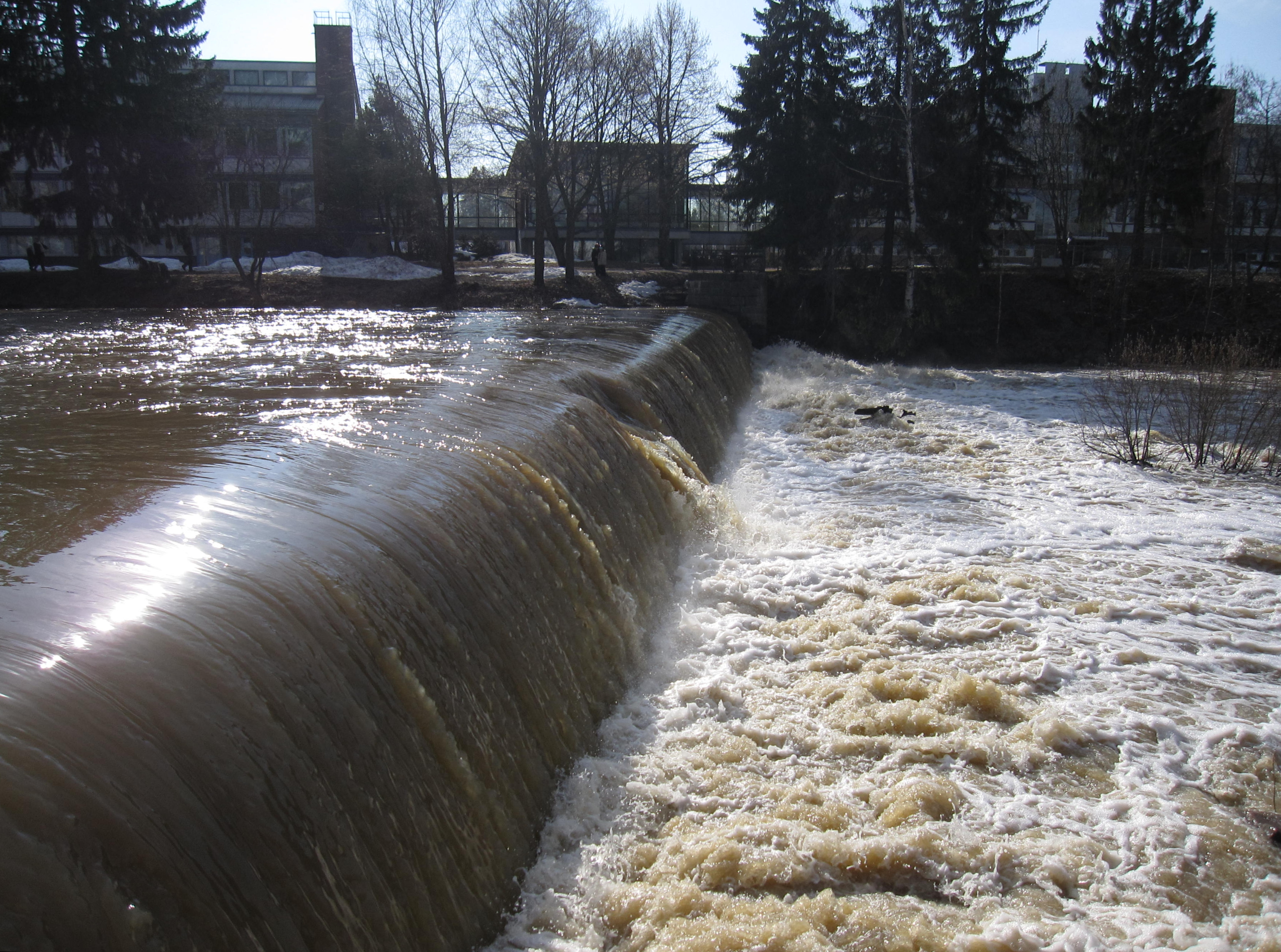
A weir creating a small cascade on a river in Finland

welfare geography
An approach in human geography which considers the areal differentiation and spatial organization of human activity from the perspective of the welfare (health, prosperity, well-being, etc.) of the people involved, covering everything, positive or negative, contributing to the quality of human life and examining how and where observed inequalities between different societies arise.
well
A hole or shaft dug into the ground to access liquid resources, especially water, oil, or gas, from beneath the Earth's surface. Water wells typically tap into natural groundwater aquifers and remain filled with water up to the level of the water table, which can vary seasonally. The water is drawn up by a pump, or by using containers such as buckets that are raised mechanically or by hand. An artesian well taps a water source held under considerable pressure.
Western Hemisphere
The half sphere of the Earth that is west of the Prime Meridian and east of the antimeridian, and opposite the Eastern Hemisphere. The Western Hemisphere includes all of the Americas, the Atlantic Ocean, and a large portion of the Pacific Ocean.
wetland
Any area of land or ecosystem, natural or artificial, which is flooded or saturated by water, either seasonally or intermittently for short periods or permanently for years or decades, and characterized generally by oxygen-poor hydric soils, distinct flora, high biodiversity, and interactions between terrestrial and aquatic processes. Wetlands may be freshwater, brackish, or saltwater ecosystems, and are often classified based on their sources of water (as with tidal wetlands, estuaries, floodplains, fens, and bogs) and/or their dominant vegetation (as with marshes and swamps).
wilderness
Any natural environment which has not been significantly developed or modified by human activity, or within which natural processes operate without human interference. Such areas are considered important for the survival of wild plant and animal species as well as for maintaining biodiversity and ecological stability. Wildernesses are often protected areas.
wind gap

A pass, notch, or opening in a ridge or mountain range, originally carved by a watercourse flowing through it but which is now dry as a result of stream capture. Contrast water gap.
wind rose
See compass rose.
windward
The side of a landmass facing the direction from which the wind is blowing. Contrast leeward.
winterbourne

An intermittent stream or bourne which is dry during the summer, especially one formed in the downlands of southern England.
witness hill
world
world city
See global city.
World Geodetic System (WGS)
A standard geographic coordinate system, spheroidal reference ellipsoid (for raw altitude data), and geoid (which defines the nominal sea level) used in cartography, geodesy, and satellite navigation applications worldwide. The latest revision, WGS84, is the standard coordinate system used by the Global Positioning System.
world map
A map of most or all of the surface of the Earth.
worldwide
See global.

== Z ==
zeuge
A tabular mass of rock that has become perched atop a pinnacle created by erosion (often aeolian) of the softer, underlying rock. See also demoiselle, hoodoo, and pinnacle.
zibar
A type of low sand dune with limited slip face development, often occurring in the corridors between higher dunes.
zonation
In biogeography and ecology, the separation of the Earth's flora and fauna into distinct groups occupying characteristic habitats, biomes, ecozones, or other idealized geographic divisions, primarily defined by climate, for the purpose of identifying and categorizing patterns in biodiversity. The boundaries of the resulting "zones" may be loosely defined or even somewhat arbitrary. The term has also been extended to include any ecological unit with spatial dimensions.
zoning
The public regulation of land and building use to control the character of a place.
zenith
The imaginary point on the celestial sphere that is directly above a particular location (i.e. in the vertical direction exactly opposite to the apparent direction of the gravitational force at that location). Contrast nadir.

== See also ==
- Index of geography articles
- Outline of geography

== Notes ==
Much of this material was copied from U.S. government works which are in the public domain because they are not eligible for copyright protection.
