= Index of geography articles =

This page is a list of geography topics.

== 0–9 ==
- 3D city models

== A ==
- Anatopism
- Ancient Indian subcontinent
- Arbia's law of geography
- Atlantic World

== B ==
- Behavioral geography
- Biogeography
- Border
- British Cartographic Society

== C ==
- Cartography
- Chevron (land form)
- Climatology
- Continental Island
- Cross-border town naming
- Cultural geography
- Cultural region
- China

== D ==
- Demography
- Development geography
- Digital orthophoto quadrangle
- Direction (geometry, geography)
- Distance decay

== E ==
- Earth
- Economic geography
- Ecogovernmentality
- Ethnography
- Extreme environment

== F ==
- Feminist geography
- Field (geography)
- Fundamental plane (spherical coordinates)

== G ==
- Gazetteer
- Geoarchaeology
- Geodesy
- Geographic feature
- Geographic information science
- Geographic targeting
- Geographers on Film
- Geography and wealth
- Geomorphology
- Geopolitics
- Geostatistics
- Glossary of geography terms (A–M)
- Glossary of geography terms (N–Z)
- Governmentality

== H ==
- Health geography
- Hermit kingdom
- Historical geography
- History of geography
- Household electricity approach
- Human ecology
- Human settlement
- Hydrology

== I ==
- Ice island
- Incorporation of nature within a city
- Indian subcontinent
- Indices of deprivation 2004
- Indices of deprivation 2007
- Intermontane

== K ==
- Kappa effect

== L ==
- Land cover
- Landform
- Landlocked developing countries
- Landscape connectivity
- Landscape ecology
- Linear Reference System

== M ==
- Map
- Military geography
- Minimum bounding rectangle
- Muslim world

== N ==
- Nunatak hypothesis

== P ==
- Palaeogeography
- Pedology
- Philosophy of geography
- Place
- Place identity
- Political ecology
- Political geography
- Population density
- Population geography
- Poquoson (geographic term)
- Provisional Administrative Line

== R ==
- Rank–size distribution
- Region
- Regional geography
- Rock-cut basin

== S ==
- Sense of place
- Small Island Developing States
- Snow line
- Social geography
- South American capital cities
- Spatial analysis
- Strategic geography
- Subregion
- Swath width

== T ==
- Technical geography
- Time geography
- Tidewater (geographic term)
- Tobler's first law of geography
- Tobler's second law of geography
- Tourism geography
- Traditional knowledge GIS
- Transportation geography
- Triangulated irregular network
- Tropical geography

== U ==
- Urban geography
- Urban semiotics

== See also ==
- Lists of places
- Outline of geography
