= Bone Baev =

Bulgarian zoologist and geologist

- Born: 1864; Shipka
- Died: 19 May 1894 (aged 29–30); Istanbul
- Citizenship: Bulgarian
- Education: University of Geneva
- Scientific career
- Fields: zoology geology
- Workplaces: Sofia University

Bone Baev (Bulgarian: Боне Баев; 1867 – 19 May 1894) was a Bulgarian zoologist and geologist.

== Biography ==
Bone Baev was born in the then village of Shipka in 1864. In 1891, he graduated in natural sciences from the University of Geneva. On 20 August 1889, he was elected a member of the Swiss Geological Society. From January to November 1890, he conducted daily studies of the physical and chemical properties of the waters of the river Arve. The results of the study were presented in his dissertation The Waters of the Arve River, Studies in Experimental Geology of Erosion and Transport in Torrential Rivers with Glacial Tributaries for which Baev was awarded a doctorate in natural sciences. For his in-depth study of a little-developed scientific field of potamology, he received the 1891 Davy University Prize. On 15 October 1891, he became the first adjunct professor of mineralogy, geology and zoology at the Faculty of Physics and Mathematics of Sofia University, and on 1 September 1893, he became a full-time professor. In 1892 Bone Baev studied the possibility to create the first aquarium in Bulgaria in the Black Sea town of Burgas but the project remained unfinished due to his early death; the first aquarium in the country was eventually inaugurated in Varna more that a decade later at the initiative of the Bulgarian Prince Ferdinand I, himself a keen zoologist. Baev passed away in Istanbul on 19 May 1894.
