= Playfair's law =

Empirical law relating stream size to valley size in erosion studies

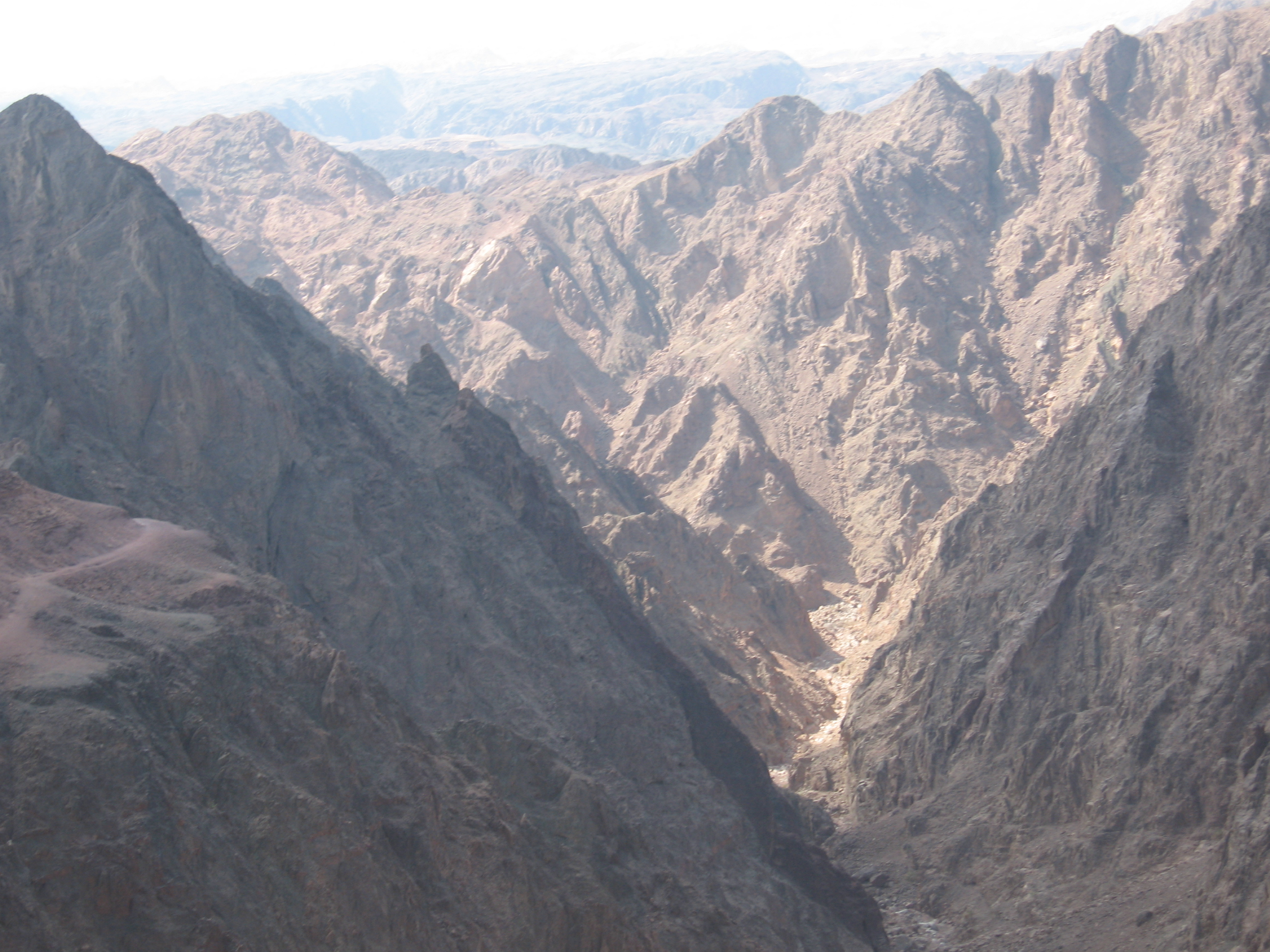
Gishron Stream, Israel. Showing the relationship; a large and deep stream in its proportionally sized valley.

In estimating erosion, Playfair's law is an empirical relationship that relates the size of a stream to the valley it runs through. It is better defined as a theory rather than law.

== Definition ==
The law states each stream cuts into its own valley, that each valley is proportional in size to its stream and that the stream junctions in the valley are proportional in depth in accordance with the stream level. Although there are models, in the most basic sense it simply says that large, fast streams will be in large valleys and vice versa. This is because steady, heavy flow of water will tug surrounding soil and subsequently erode and deepen the valley it cuts through.

Playfair's law also states that at tributary junctions, tributaries will have the same slope as the main channels. This is referred to by saying that the junctions occur "at grade".

== Equation ==
By modeling Playfair's law in the following mathematical scheme, we can find the incision rate of the stream into the valley by following:

$\dot{\varepsilon}=k A^{m}S^{n}$
where
$\ \varepsilon$ is the erosion (or incision), and $\ \dot{\varepsilon}$ is therefore equal to the incision rate
$\ k$ is an erosion parameter (see below)
$\ A$ is the area drained by the stream
$\ S$ is the local gradient of the channel
$\ m,n$ stream parameters (see below)

In evaluating the case specific parameters, we regard $\ k$ as a parameter that is dependent on the type of land or soil that the stream is penetrating. Also, $m,n$ can be estimated by first assuming that at the junction the law holds over the distance used to determine S and taking their ratios (m/n) at different points, then substitution.

== See also ==
- Glacial trough
