= Urban semiotics =

Study of meaning in urban form of signs and symbols

Urban semiotics is the study of meaning in urban form as generated by signs, symbols, and their social connotations.

== Overview ==
Most urban semiotic theory is based on social semiotics, which considers social connotations, including meanings related to ideology and power structures, in addition to denotative meanings of signs. As such, urban semiotics focuses on material objects of the built environment, such as streets, squares, parks, and buildings, but also unbuilt cultural products such as building codes, planning documents, unbuilt designs, real estate advertising, and popular discourse about the city, such as architectural criticism and real estate blogs.

Theorists who take a social semiotic approach to urban semiotics define their discipline in opposition to the methods of behavioral geography, beginning with the work of Kevin Lynch in The Image of the City, which they criticize for being limited by its exclusive focus on the denotative level of communication (recognition of spatial elements, such as paths, as conceptual objects), ignoring the connotative meanings associated with urban forms; instead, urban semioticians argue that urban structures often become recognizable because they have symbolic meaning beyond their functional meanings. The social semiotic approach to urban semiotics also grew out of a critique of architectural semiotics, which was perceived to be overly attached to linguistic models of semiosis and thus unable to adequately consider the social connotations of signs.

Some theorists have used semiotic models in empirical studies of the construction of meaning in urban environments. Raymond Ledrut has used questionnaires and interviews about viewers' responses to sets of photographs in order to examine the role of class in shaping mental models of the city. Martin Krampen conducted studies of photograph recognition in order to discover the level of facade detail required to identify building types, and to examine the role of socioeconomic status in shaping preference for building styles.

== Associated authors ==
Roland Barthes
Francoise Choay
Umberto Eco
Mark Gottdiener
Algirdas Julien Greimas
Martin Krampen
Alexandros Lagopoulos
Raymond Ledrut
Henri Lefebvre
