= Potamology =

Study of rivers

Potamology (from Ancient Greek: ποταμός - river, Ancient Greek: λόγος - science) is the study of rivers, a branch of hydrology. The subject of study is the hydrological processes of rivers, the morphometry of river basins, the structure of river networks; channel processes, regime of river mouth areas; evaporation and infiltration of water in a river basin; water, thermal, ice regime of rivers; sediment regime; sources and types of rivers feeding, and various chemical and physical processes in rivers.

== Bibliography ==
- Lindeman, R. L., "The trophic-dynamic aspect of ecology", Ecology, 1942, XXIII, pp. 399–418.
- Williams, R. B., "Computer simulation of energy flow in Cedar Bog Lake, Minnesota, based on the classical studies of Lindeman", Systems analysis and simulation in ecology (a cura di B. C. Patten), vol. I, New York 1971, pp. 543–582.
