= Brownsville–Matamoros =

International transborder agglomeration in southern Texas and northern Tamaulipas

Matamoros–Brownsville
- Transborder Agglomeration
Interactive Map of Lower Rio Grande Valley
Brownsville–Harlingen–Raymondville, TX CSA
Brownsville–Harlingen, TX MSA
Raymondville, TX μSA
McAllen–Edinburg, TX CSA
McAllen–Edinburg–Mission, TX MSA
Rio Grande City–Roma, TX μSA
In Mexico
Matamoros, TM ZM
Reynosa, TM ZM
- Countries: United States; Mexico
- States: Texas; Tamaulipas
- Principal cities: Matamoros; Brownsville: Harlingen; Raymondville

Population (2010 est.)
  - Metro: 1,136,995 (110th)
- Time zone: UTC–06:00 (Zona Centro)
  - Summer (DST): UTC–05:00 (DST)

Guns trained on Matamoros from Brownsville Battery

Matamoros–Brownsville, also known as Brownsville–Matamoros, is one of the six transborder agglomerations along the Mexico–United States border. It is part of the Lower Rio Grande Valley region. The city of Matamoros is situated in the Mexican state of Tamaulipas, on the south bank of the Rio Grande, while the city of Brownsville is located in the U.S. state of Texas, directly north across the bank of the Rio Grande. The Matamoros–Brownsville area is connected by four international bridges. In addition, this transnational conurbation area has a population of 1,136,995, making it the fourth-largest metropolitan area on the Mexico-U.S. border.

The area of Matamoros–Brownsville lies among the top-10 fastest-growing urban areas in the United States. The Brownsville–Harlingen and the Brownsville–Harlingen–Raymondville metropolitan areas are included in the official countdown of this transnational conurbation.

== Municipalities/counties ==
- Matamoros Municipality, Tamaulipas
- Cameron County, Texas
- Willacy County, Texas

== Communities ==
Note: Principal cities are bolded.

=== Cities in Mexico ===
- **Matamoros, Tamaulipas**

=== Populated places ===
Note: Within the municipality of Matamoros.

- Control
- Estación Ramírez
- Buena Vista
- Las Rusias
- Santa Adelaida
- La Gloria
- Sandoval
- México Agrario
- 20 de Noviembre
- Ignacio Zaragoza
- Unión

=== Villages ===
- Over 468 municipal villages.

=== Cities in the United States ===
- **Brownsville**
- **Harlingen**
- La Feria
- Los Fresnos
- Lyford
- Palm Valley
- Port Isabel
- **Raymondville**
- Rio Hondo
- San Benito
- San Perlita
- Starbase

=== Towns ===
- Bayview
- Combes
- Indian Lake
- Laguna Vista
- Los Indios
- Primera
- Rancho Viejo
- Santa Rosa
- South Padre Island

=== Villages ===
- Rangerville

=== Census-designated places ===
- Arroyo Alto
- Arroyo Colorado Estates
- Arroyo Gardens
- Bausell and Ellis
- Bixby
- Bluetown
- Cameron Park
- Chula Vista
- Del Mar Heights
- El Camino Angosto
- Encantada-Ranchito-El Calaboz
- Grand Acres
- Green Valley Farms
- Iglesia Antigua
- Juarez
- La Feria North
- La Paloma
- La Tina Ranch
- Lago
- Laguna Heights
- Las Palmas II
- Lasana
- Lasara
- Laureles
- Los Angeles Subdivision
- Lozano
- Lyford South
- Olmito
- Orason
- Port Mansfield
- Ranchette Estates
- Ratamosa
- Reid Hope King
- San Pedro
- Santa Maria
- Santa Monica
- Sebastian
- Solis
- South Point
- Tierra Bonita
- Villa del Sol
- Villa Pancho
- Willamar
- Yznaga
- Zapata Ranch

== See also ==
- San Diego–Tijuana
- El Paso–Juárez
- Reynosa–McAllen Metropolitan Area
- Laredo–Nuevo Laredo
- Metropolitan area of Tampico
- Transnational conurbations Mexico/USA
