= Brownsville–Harlingen–Raymondville combined statistical area =

Lower Rio Grande Valley
- Combined Statistical Area
- Brownsville–Harlingen–Raymondville, TX CSA
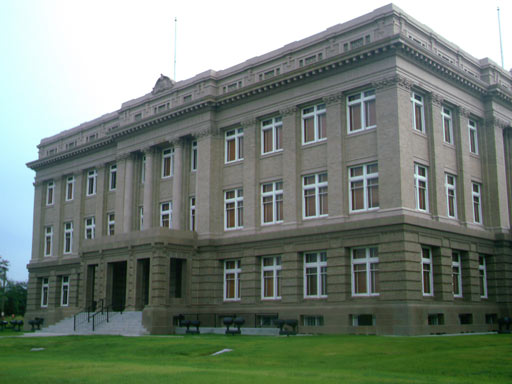
- Cameron County Courthouse of 1912
Interactive Map of Lower Rio Grande Valley
(United States-Texas Side)
Brownsville–Harlingen–Raymondville, TX CSA
Brownsville–Harlingen, TX MSA
Raymondville, TX μSA
McAllen–Edinburg, TX CSA
McAllen–Edinburg–Mission, TX MSA
Rio Grande City–Roma, TX μSA
- Country: United States
- State: Texas
- Counties: Cameron; Willacy; Hidalgo; Starr
- Principal and Major Cities: Brownsville; Harlingen; San Benito; Raymondville; McAllen; Edinburg; Mission; Rio Grande City; Roma
- Time zone: UTC-6 (CST)
  - Summer (DST): UTC-5 (CDT)

The Brownsville–Harlingen–Raymondville combined statistical area is made up of two counties in the Rio Grande Valley region of Texas. The CSA consists of the Brownsville–Harlingen metropolitan statistical area and the Raymondville micropolitan statistical area. A 2013 census estimate puts its population at 439,197.

== Counties ==
- Cameron
- Willacy

== Communities ==
=== Cities ===
- Brownsville (principal city)
- Harlingen (principal city)
- La Feria
- Los Fresnos
- Lyford
- Palm Valley
- Port Isabel
- Raymondville (principal city)
- Rio Hondo
- San Benito
- San Perlita
- Starbase

=== Towns ===
- Bayview
- Combes
- Indian Lake
- Laguna Vista
- Los Indios
- Primera
- Rancho Viejo
- Santa Rosa
- South Padre Island

=== Villages ===
- Rangerville

=== Census-designated places ===
- Arroyo Alto
- Arroyo Colorado Estates
- Arroyo Gardens
- Bausell and Ellis
- Bixby
- Bluetown
- Cameron Park
- Chula Vista
- Del Mar Heights
- El Camino Angosto
- Encantada-Ranchito El Calaboz
- Grand Acres
- Green Valley Farms
- Iglesia Antigua
- Juarez
- La Feria North
- La Paloma
- La Tina Ranch
- Lago
- Laguna Heights
- Las Palmas II
- Lasana
- Lasara
- Laureles
- Los Angeles Subdivision
- Lozano
- Lyford South
- Olmito
- Orason
- Port Mansfield
- Ranchette Estates
- Ratamosa
- Reid Hope King
- San Pedro
- Santa Maria
- Santa Monica
- Sebastian
- Solis
- South Point
- Tierra Bonita
- Villa del Sol
- Villa Pancho
- Willamar
- Yznaga
- Zapata Ranch

== Demographics ==
At the 2010 census, 428,354 people, 102,851 households and 84,537 families were residing within the CSA. The racial makeup of the CSA was 79.73% White, 0.58% African American, 0.44% Native American, 0.46% Asian, 16.49% from other races, and 2.30% from two or more races. Hispanics or Latinos of any race were 84.42% of the population.

The median household income was $24,135, and the median family income was $26,465. Males had a median income of $21,231 versus $16,848 for females. The per capita income for the CSA was $10,191.

== See also ==
- List of cities in Texas
- Texas census statistical areas
- List of Texas metropolitan areas
