= Los Cuates, Texas =

- Unincorporated community
- Location within Texas Location within the United States
- Coordinates: 26°04′51″N 97°29′48″W
- Country: United States
- State: Texas
- County: Cameron
- Elevation: 30 ft (9.1 m)
- Time zone: UTC-6 (Central (CST))
  - Summer (DST): UTC-5 (CDT)
- Area code: 956
- GNIS feature ID: 1374723

Los Cuates is an unincorporated community in Cameron County, Texas, United States. It is located within the Rio Grande Valley and the Brownsville-Harlingen metropolitan area.

== History ==
The area now known as Los Cuates was first settled in the late 1940s, initially consisting of scattered houses and farms. It was most likely named after the nearby Resaca de Los Cuates. By the 1960s, the area had developed into a colonia with several scattered homes. In 1983, there were 30 houses. Three years later, Los Cuates reported a population of 81 residents living in 18 homes on 5 acres (2.0 ha) of land. No population estimates were recorded in 2000.

== Geography ==
Los Cuates is located on Farm to Market Road 1572, 1 mile (1.6 km) northwest of Los Fresnos in central Cameron County.

== Education ==
Today, the community is served by the Los Fresnos Consolidated Independent School District. Children in the community attend Los Fresnos Elementary School, Liberty Memorial Middle School, and Los Fresnos High School.
