= La Penusca, Texas =

- Unincorporated community
- Location within Texas Location within the United States
- Coordinates: 26°4′40″N 97°29′40″W
- Country: United States
- State: Texas
- County: Cameron
- Elevation: 30 ft (9.1 m)
- Time zone: UTC-6 (Central (CST))
  - Summer (DST): UTC-5 (CDT)
- Area code: 956
- GNIS feature ID: 1374422

La Penusca is an unincorporated community in Cameron County, Texas, United States. It is located within the Rio Grande Valley and the Brownsville-Harlingen metropolitan area.

== History ==
La Penusca consisted of a few scattered farms in the late 1940s and had 27 homes in 1983. There were no population estimates in 2000.

== Geography ==
La Penusca is located on the shore of the Resaca de los Cuates, 1 mile (1.6 km) west of Los Fresnos in central Cameron County.

== Education ==
Today, the community is served by the Los Fresnos Consolidated Independent School District. Children in the community attend Los Fresnos Elementary School, Liberty Memorial Middle School, and Los Fresnos High School.
