= Monte Grande, Texas =

- Unincorporated community
- Location within Texas Location within the United States
- Coordinates: 26°16′7″N 97°31′9″W
- Country: United States
- State: Texas
- County: Cameron
- Elevation: 7 ft (2.1 m)
- Time zone: UTC-6 (Central (CST))
  - Summer (DST): UTC-5 (CDT)
- Area code: 956
- GNIS feature ID: 1378696

Monte Grande is an unincorporated community in Cameron County, Texas, United States. According to the Handbook of Texas, the community had a population of 97 in 2000. It is located within the Rio Grande Valley and the Brownsville-Harlingen metropolitan area.

== History ==
Monte Grande existed as a community in the late 1970s. The county highway map of that decade showed one business here. Its population was 97 in 2000.

== Geography ==
Monte Grande is located off Farm to Market Road 2925, 12 miles (19 km) northeast of Harlingen in northern Cameron County.

== Education ==
Today, the community is served by the Los Fresnos Consolidated Independent School District. Children in the community attend Las Yescas Elementary School, Liberty Memorial Middle School, and Los Fresnos High School.
