= Cavazos, Texas =

- Unincorporated community
- Location within Texas Location within the United States
- Coordinates: 26°1′7″N 97°36′28″W
- Country: United States
- State: Texas
- County: Cameron
- Elevation: 43 ft (13 m)
- Time zone: UTC-6 (Central (CST))
  - Summer (DST): UTC-5 (CDT)
- Area code: 956
- GNIS feature ID: 2034727

Cavazos is an unincorporated community in Cameron County, Texas, United States. According to the Handbook of Texas, the community had a population of 201 in 2000. It is located within the Rio Grande Valley and the Brownsville-Harlingen metropolitan area.

== Education ==
Cavazos had its own school in 1936. Today, the community is served by the San Benito Consolidated Independent School District. Children in the community attend La Encantada Elementary School, San Benito Riverside Middle School, and San Benito High School.
