= Carricitos, Texas =

- Unincorporated community
- Location within Texas Location within the United States
- Coordinates: 26°2′43″N 97°42′35″W
- Country: United States
- State: Texas
- County: Cameron
- Elevation: 52 ft (16 m)
- Time zone: UTC-6 (Central (CST))
  - Summer (DST): UTC-5 (CDT)
- Area code: 956
- GNIS feature ID: 1372949

Carricitos is an unincorporated community in Cameron County, Texas, United States. According to the Handbook of Texas, the community had a population of 25 in 2000. It is located within the Rio Grande Valley and the Brownsville-Harlingen metropolitan area.

== Geography ==
Carricitos is located near the intersection of U.S. Highway 281 and Farm to Market Road 2520, 7 miles (11 km) southwest of San Benito in southwestern Cameron County.

== Education ==
Carricitos had its own school in 1936 and 1948. Today, the community is served by the San Benito Consolidated Independent School District. Children in the community attend Rangerville Elementary School, San Benito Riverside Middle School, and San Benito High School.
