= Buena Vista, Cameron County, Texas =

- Unincorporated community
- Location within Texas Location within the United States
- Coordinates: 26°14′42″N 97°20′56″W
- Country: United States
- State: Texas
- County: Cameron
- Elevation: 13 ft (4.0 m)
- Time zone: UTC-6 (Central (CST))
  - Summer (DST): UTC-5 (CDT)
- Area code: 956
- GNIS feature ID: 1378066

Buena Vista is an unincorporated community in Cameron County, Texas, United States. It is located within the Rio Grande Valley and the Brownsville-Harlingen metropolitan area.

== History ==
There was a brief period of settlement in Buena Vista in the 1930s. County highway maps of that year showed several farms here. Buena Vista continued to be listed on county maps in the 1960s, but there were no population estimates in 2000.

== Geography ==
Buena Vista is located 24 miles (39 km) northeast of Brownsville in northeastern Cameron County. It is just north of the Laguna Atascosa National Wildlife Refuge.

== Education ==
Buena Vista had its own school in the 1930s. Today, the community is served by the Los Fresnos Consolidated Independent School District. Children in the community attend Palmer-Laakso Elementary School, Los Cuates Middle School, and Los Fresnos High School.
