= Holly Beach, Texas =

- Unincorporated community
- Location within Texas Location within the United States
- Coordinates: 26°8′6″N 97°17′29″W
- Country: United States
- State: Texas
- County: Cameron
- Elevation: 0 ft (0 m)
- Time zone: UTC-6 (Central (CST))
  - Summer (DST): UTC-5 (CDT)
- Area code: 956
- GNIS feature ID: 2034189

Holly Beach is an unincorporated community in Cameron County, Texas, United States. It is located within the Rio Grande Valley and the Brownsville-Harlingen metropolitan area.

== History ==
Holly Beach was established sometime during the second half of the 20th century.

== Geography ==
Holly Beach is located north of Farm to Market Road 510, 20 miles (32 km) northeast of Brownsville and 7 miles (11 km) northwest of Port Isabel in eastern Cameron County.

=== Climate ===
The climate in this area is characterized by hot, humid summers and generally mild to cool winters. According to the Köppen Climate Classification system, Holly Beach has a humid subtropical climate, abbreviated "Cfa" on climate maps.

== Education ==
Today, the community is served by the Los Fresnos Consolidated Independent School District. Children in the community attend Palmer-Laakso Elementary School, Los Cuates Middle School, and Los Fresnos High School.
