= Palmer, Cameron County, Texas =

- Census-designated place
- Location within Texas Location within the United States
- Coordinates: 26°4′23″N 97°38′3″W
- Country: United States
- State: Texas
- County: Cameron

Area
  - Total: 1.18 sq mi (3.05 km^{2})
  - Land: 1.12 sq mi (2.91 km^{2})
  - Water: 0.054 sq mi (0.14 km^{2})
- Elevation: 45 ft (14 m)
- Time zone: UTC-6 (Central (CST))
  - Summer (DST): UTC-5 (CDT)
- ZIP Code: 78586 (San Benito)
- Area code: 956
- FIPS code: 48-54748
- GNIS feature ID: 2805753

Palmer is a colonia and census-designated place (CDP) in Cameron County, Texas, United States. It was first listed as a CDP prior to the 2020 census.

It is in the southern part of the county, bordered to the west by San Benito, to the northeast by Brownsville, to the east by Rice Tracts, to the south by Encantada-Ranchito-El Calaboz, and to the southwest by La Paloma. It is 5 miles (8 km) south of the center of San Benito and 18 miles (29 km) northwest of downtown Brownsville.

The Resaca del Rancho Viejo, a southeast-flowing tributary of the Rio Grande, flows through the northern part of the community.

== Demographics ==
Historical population
Census	Pop.	Note	%±
2020	1,082		—
U.S. Decennial Census; 1850–1900 1910; 1920 1930 1940; 1950 1960 1970; 1980 1990 2000; 2010 2020

Palmer first appeared as a census designated place in the 2020 U.S. census.

=== 2020 census ===
Palmer CDP, Texas – Racial and ethnic composition Note: the US Census treats Hispanic/Latino as an ethnic category. This table excludes Latinos from the racial categories and assigns them to a separate category. Hispanics/Latinos may be of any race.
Race / Ethnicity (NH = Non-Hispanic)	Pop 2020	% 2020
White alone (NH)	20	1.85%
Black or African American alone (NH)	1	0.09%
Native American or Alaska Native alone (NH)	0	0.00%
Asian alone (NH)	0	0.00%
Native Hawaiian or Pacific Islander alone (NH)	0	0.00%
Other race alone (NH)	5	0.46%
Mixed race or Multiracial (NH)	1	0.09%
Hispanic or Latino (any race)	1,055	97.50%
Total	1,082	100.00%
