= Las Yescas, Texas =

- Unincorporated community
- Location within Texas Location within the United States
- Coordinates: 26°13′22″N 97°30′21″W
- Country: United States
- State: Texas
- County: Cameron
- Elevation: 16 ft (4.9 m)
- Time zone: UTC-6 (Central (CST))
  - Summer (DST): UTC-5 (CDT)
- Area code: 956
- GNIS feature ID: 1339690

Las Yescas is an unincorporated community in Cameron County, Texas, United States. According to the Handbook of Texas, the community had a population of 221 in 2000. It is located within the Rio Grande Valley and the Brownsville-Harlingen metropolitan area.

== Geography ==
Las Yescas is located near the intersection of Farm to Market Road 803 and Farm to Market Road 106, 5 miles (8.0 km) east of Rio Hondo in northeastern Cameron County.

== Education ==
Las Yescas had its own school in 1948. Today, the community is served by the Los Fresnos Consolidated Independent School District. Children in the community attend Las Yescas Elementary School, Liberty Memorial Middle School, and Los Fresnos High School.
