= Landrum, Texas =

- Unincorporated community
- Location within Texas Location within the United States
- Coordinates: 26°2′38″N 97°41′55″W
- Country: United States
- State: Texas
- County: Cameron
- Elevation: 52 ft (16 m)
- Time zone: UTC-6 (Central (CST))
  - Summer (DST): UTC-5 (CDT)
- Area code: 956
- GNIS feature ID: 1374462

Landrum, also known as Landrum Station, is an unincorporated community in Cameron County, Texas, United States. According to the Handbook of Texas, the community had a population of 125 in 2000. It is located within the Rio Grande Valley and the Brownsville-Harlingen metropolitan area.

== History ==
Landrum was established when a railway spur was built through the area in 1913. A post office was opened in the early 1900s. The community had a general store and 25 residents in 1948, and from 1964 through 2000, the population was 125.

== Geography ==
Landrum is located near the intersection of U.S. Highway 281 and Farm to Market Road 2520, 8 miles (13 km) south of Harlingen in southwestern Cameron County.

== Education ==
Today, the community is served by the San Benito Consolidated Independent School District. Children in the community attend Rangerville Elementary School, San Benito Riverside Middle School, and San Benito High School.
