= Joe Jon Finley =

American football player and coach (born 1985)

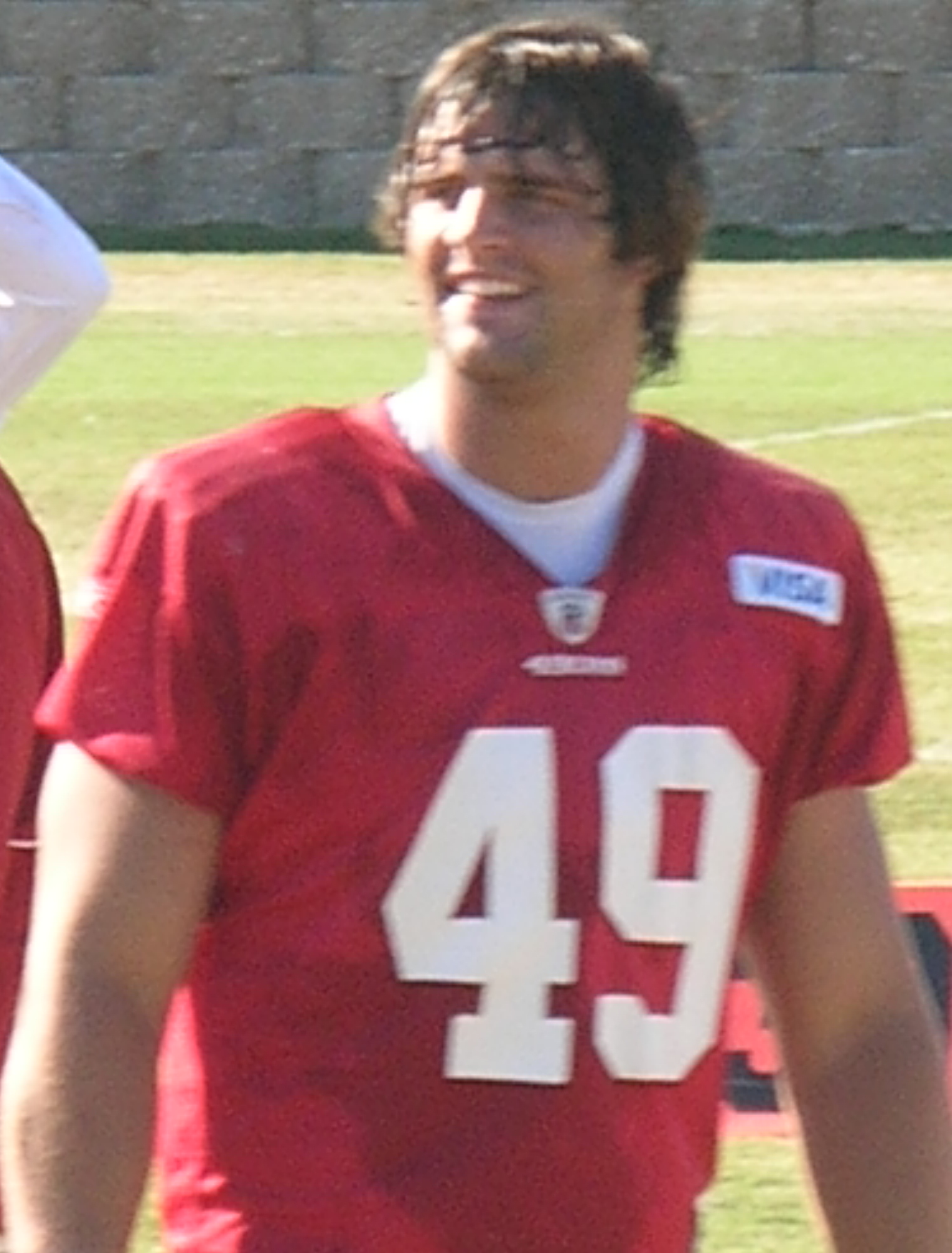
- Finley with the San Francisco 49ers in 2010

Current position
- Title: Assistant quarterbacks coach
- Team: Texas State
- Conference: Pac-12

Biographical details
- Born: January 30, 1985 (age 41); Arlington, Texas, U.S.

Playing career
- 2004–2007: Oklahoma
- 2008–2010: San Francisco 49ers
- 2010–2011: Detroit Lions
- 2012: Carolina Panthers
- Position: Tight end

Coaching career (HC unless noted)
- 2011: Los Fresnos HS (TX) (OL)
- 2012–2013: Oklahoma (GA)
- 2014: Los Fresnos HS (TX) (OL/S&C)
- 2015: Baylor (OQC)
- 2016–2018: Missouri (TE)
- 2019: Texas A&M (TE)
- 2020: Ole Miss (PGC/TE)
- 2021–2023: Oklahoma (TE)
- 2024: Oklahoma (co-OC/TE)
- 2024: Oklahoma (OC/TE)
- 2025: Oklahoma (TE)
- 2026–present: Texas State (assistant QB)

Joe Jon "J. J." Finley (born January 30, 1985) is an American football coach and former tight end who most recently coached tight ends at the University of Oklahoma. He previously served as an assistant coach at the University of Mississippi, Texas A&M University, University of Missouri and Baylor University.

Finley played college football at the University of Oklahoma before signing with the San Francisco 49ers of the National Football League (NFL) as an undrafted free agent in 2008.

== Early life ==
Finley grew up in Arlington, Texas and attended Arlington High School, where he played football and was a hurdler on the school's track team. Initially a tight end as a sophomore, Finley was moved to quarterback for his junior and senior years of high school, throwing for over 1,600 yards and rushing for nearly 900 yards in his senior season. He committed to playing college football at Oklahoma.

== Playing career ==
=== College ===
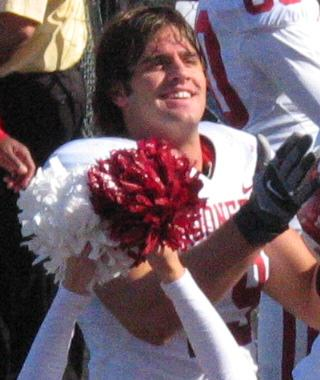
Finley in 2006

Finley entered Oklahoma as a quarterback, but converted to tight end due to lack of playing time. His breakout season came in 2006 when offensive coordinator Kevin Wilson switched from offensive line coach to tight ends coach, where Finley recorded 19 receptions for 241 yards and three touchdowns. He was praised for his ability to block, run routes, and catch passes, something that Oklahoma's other tight ends Jermaine Gresham and Brody Eldridge were unable to do.

As a redshirt senior, Finley was named team captain and improved on his numbers, catching 23 passes for 290 yards and four touchdowns. He finished his career with 62 catches for 775 yards, which ranked in the top 10 among Oklahoma tight ends as of 2021. Finley also earned honorable Big 12 mentions as a junior and senior and was an All-Academic Big 12.

=== National Football League ===
==== San Francisco 49ers ====
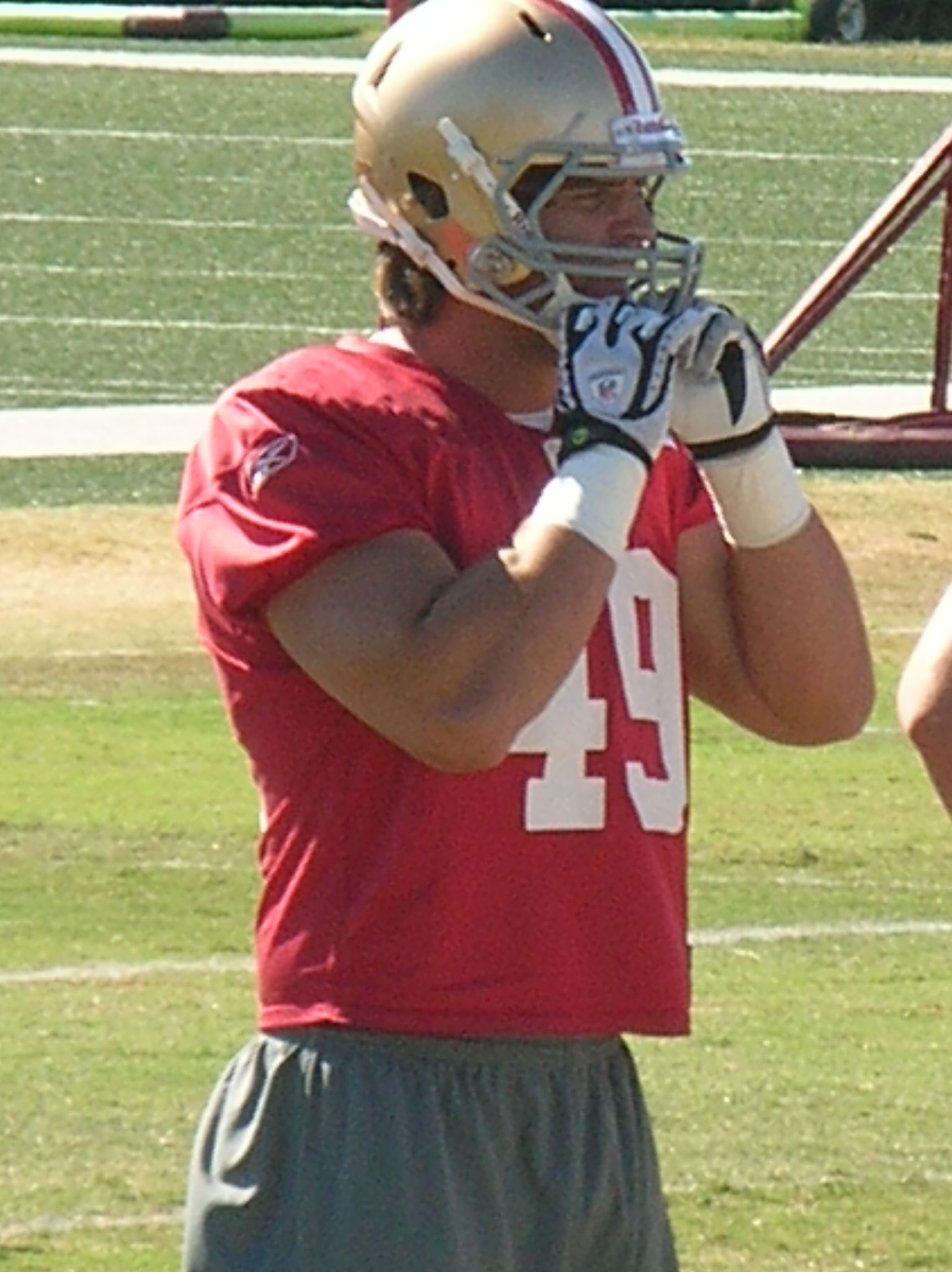
Finley at 49ers training camp in 2010

Finley signed with the San Francisco 49ers as an undrafted free agent in 2008. He never made the active roster during his time in San Francisco, spending 2008 and 2009 on the practice squad before being cut before the start of the 2010 regular season.

==== Detroit Lions ====
Finley signed with the Detroit Lions practice squad in 2010, where he spent the entire season on the practice squad. Although he was waived in the final roster cuts in 2011, Finley was signed to the active roster in 2011 for the Lions' week 6 game against the 49ers before being released in late October.

==== Carolina Panthers ====
Finley was signed by the Carolina Panthers on May 16, 2012. He was released by the Panthers on August 31, 2012 in the final roster cuts before the start of the regular season.

== Coaching career ==
=== Early career ===
After getting cut by the Lions, Finley spent 2011 as the offensive line coach at Los Fresnos High School in Texas, where his brother Clint was the head coach. He was later a graduate assistant at his alma mater Oklahoma from 2012 to 2013, taking a break to sign with the Carolina Panthers and returning after he was cut. Finley returned to Los Fresnos in 2014 as their offensive line coach and strength & conditioning coordinator before departing to be an offensive quality control analyst at Baylor in 2015.

=== Missouri ===
In 2016, Finley was named the tight ends coach at Missouri. At Missouri, he coached a group that led the nation in touchdowns scored by tight ends with 15 in 2017, while developing Albert Okwuegbunam, who was an All-SEC second-teamer and finalist for the John Mackey Award in 2018.

=== Texas A&M ===
In 2019, Finley was named the tight ends coach at Texas A&M under Jimbo Fisher.

=== Ole Miss ===
In 2020, Finley was hired as the passing game coordinator and tight ends coach at Ole Miss under Lane Kiffin.

=== Oklahoma ===
In 2021, Finley was hired as the tight ends coach at the University of Oklahoma under head coach Lincoln Riley. In 2022, Finley was retained as tight ends coach under head coach Brent Venables.

On November 29, 2023, Finley was promoted to co-offensive coordinator and tight ends coach at Oklahoma, alongside Seth Littrell, replacing Jeff Lebby after his departure to become the head coach at the Mississippi State University.

On January 1, 2026 OU fired Finley after five years with the team.

== Personal life ==
Finley and his wife Caylee have four children; daughters Blakely, Scout, and Collier and son Knox. Finley's father Mickey was a longtime high school football coach and was Joe Jon's coach in high school.
