= Cameron County, Texas =

County in Texas, United States

- County
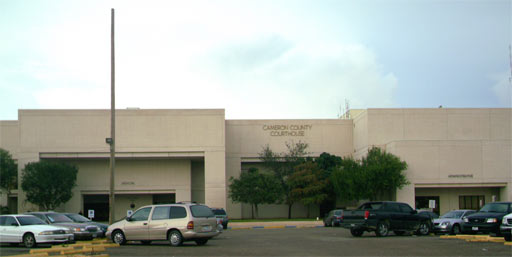
- The Cameron County Courthouse in Brownsville Administration Building

- Seal Logo

- Location within the U.S. state of Texas
- Coordinates: 26.15°N 97.45°W
- Country: United States
- State: Texas
- Founded: 1848
- Named for: Ewen Cameron
- Seat: Brownsville
- Largest city: Brownsville

Government
  - County judge: Eddie Treviño, Jr.

Area
  - Total: 1,276 sq mi (3,300 km^{2})
  - Land: 891 sq mi (2,310 km^{2})
  - Water: 386 sq mi (1,000 km^{2}) 30%

Population (2020)
  - Total: 421,017
  - Estimate (2025): 433,946 ▲
  - Density: 473/sq mi (182/km^{2})
- Time zone: UTC−6 (Central)
  - Summer (DST): UTC−5 (CDT)
- Congressional district: 34th
- Website: www.cameroncountytx.gov

Cameron County is the southernmost county in the U.S. state of Texas. As of the 2025 census estimate, its population was 433,946. Its county seat and largest city is Brownsville, with the second-largest being Harlingen.

The county was founded in 1848 and is named for Ewen Cameron, a Captain during the Texas Revolution and in the ill-fated Mier Expedition. During the later 19th century and through World War II, Fort Brown was a US Army outpost here, stimulating the development of the city of Brownsville.

Cameron County comprises the Brownsville–Harlingen metropolitan area, as well as the Brownsville-Harlingen-Raymondville combined statistical area, which itself is part of the larger Rio Grande Valley region.

The county is home to the SpaceX Starbase spaceport, situated in Boca Chica; it is also the residence of Elon Musk.

== Geography ==
According to the U.S. Census Bureau, the county has a total area of 1,276 square miles (3,300 km^{2}), of which 891 square miles (2,310 km^{2}) are land and 386 square miles (1,000 km^{2}) (30%) are covered by water. To the east, the county borders the Gulf of Mexico.

=== Major highways ===
- Interstate 2
- Interstate 69E/U.S. Highway 77
- Interstate 169/State Highway 550
- U.S. Highway 83
- U.S. Highway 281
- State Highway 4
- State Highway 48
- State Highway 100
- State Highway 107
- State Highway 345
- Spur 54
- Spur 206
- Spur 425
- Spur 486
- Loop 499

=== Adjacent counties, bodies of water, and municipalities ===
- Willacy County (north)
- Gulf of Mexico (east)
- Laguna Madre (east)
- Matamoros Municipality, Tamaulipas, Mexico (south)
- Hidalgo County (west)

=== National protected areas ===
- Laguna Atascosa National Wildlife Refuge (part)
- Lower Rio Grande Valley National Wildlife Refuge (part)
- Palo Alto Battlefield National Historical Park

== Demographics ==
Historical population
Census	Pop.	Note	%±
1850	8,541		—
1860	6,028		−29.4%
1870	10,999		82.5%
1880	14,959		36.0%
1890	14,424		−3.6%
1900	16,095		11.6%
1910	27,158		68.7%
1920	36,662		35.0%
1930	77,540		111.5%
1940	83,202		7.3%
1950	125,170		50.4%
1960	151,098		20.7%
1970	140,368		−7.1%
1980	209,680		49.4%
1990	260,120		24.1%
2000	335,227		28.9%
2010	406,220		21.2%
2020	421,017		3.6%
2025 (est.)	433,946	▲	3.1%
U.S. Decennial Census; 1850–2010 2010 2020

=== Racial and ethnic composition ===
Cameron County, Texas – Racial and ethnic composition Note: the US Census treats Hispanic/Latino as an ethnic category. This table excludes Latinos from the racial categories and assigns them to a separate category. Hispanics/Latinos may be of any race.
Race / Ethnicity (NH = Non-Hispanic)	Pop 1980	Pop 1990	Pop 2000	Pop 2010	Pop 2020	% 1980	% 1990	% 2000	% 2010	% 2020
White alone (NH)	46,488	45,354	48,679	43,427	37,107	22.17%	17.44%	14.52%	10.69%	8.81%
Black or African American alone (NH)	591	567	909	1,192	1,405	0.28%	0.22%	0.27%	0.29%	0.33%
Native American or Alaska Native alone (NH)	303	184	334	385	365	0.14%	0.07%	0.10%	0.09%	0.09%
Asian alone (NH)	342	602	1,522	2,486	2,596	0.16%	0.23%	0.45%	0.61%	0.62%
Native Hawaiian or Pacific Islander alone (NH)	x	x	41	76	80	x	x	0.01%	0.02%	0.02%
Other race alone (NH)	349	418	118	191	846	0.17%	0.16%	0.04%	0.05%	0.20%
Mixed race or Multiracial (NH)	x	x	888	716	1,938	x	x	0.26%	0.18%	0.46%
Hispanic or Latino (any race)	161,654	212,995	282,736	357,747	376,680	77.08%	81.88%	84.34%	88.07%	89.47%
Total	209,727	260,120	335,227	406,220	421,017	100.00%	100.00%	100.00%	100.00%	100.00%

=== American Community Survey 2025 data ===
The United States Census Bureau estimated that in 2025, Cameron County’s population was 433.946. It was also estimated that the county's population was 8,72% Non-Hispanic White, 89,33% Hispanic or Latino, 0,67% Non-Hispanic Black, 0,79% Asian, 0,10% Native American, 0,02% Pacific Islander, and 0,38% Multiracial.

Total	Population	Percentage
Non-Hispanic White	37.839	8,72%
Hispanic or Latino	387.625	89,33%
Non-Hispanic Black	2.908	0,67%
Asian	3.407	0,79%
Native American	426	0,10%
Pacific Islander	106	0,02%
Non-Hispanic Multiracial	1.635	0,38%

=== 2020 census ===
As of the 2020 census, the county had a population of 421,017. The median age was 34.0 years. 28.5% of residents were under the age of 18 and 14.4% of residents were 65 years of age or older. For every 100 females there were 93.3 males, and for every 100 females age 18 and over there were 89.2 males age 18 and over.

The racial makeup of the county was 38.6% White, 0.5% Black or African American, 0.7% American Indian and Alaska Native, 0.7% Asian, <0.1% Native Hawaiian and Pacific Islander, 19.0% from some other race, and 40.4% from two or more races. Hispanic or Latino residents of any race comprised 89.5% of the population.

82.4% of residents lived in urban areas, while 17.6% lived in rural areas.

There were 132,507 households in the county, of which 42.8% had children under the age of 18 living in them. Of all households, 49.0% were married-couple households, 15.2% were households with a male householder and no spouse or partner present, and 30.3% were households with a female householder and no spouse or partner present. About 19.1% of all households were made up of individuals and 9.3% had someone living alone who was 65 years of age or older.

There were 154,905 housing units, of which 14.5% were vacant. Among occupied housing units, 64.3% were owner-occupied and 35.7% were renter-occupied. The homeowner vacancy rate was 1.3% and the rental vacancy rate was 9.0%.

=== 2010 census ===
As of the 2010 census, 406,220 people, 119,631 households, and 96,579 families were residing in the county. The population density was 370 people per square mile (140 people/km^{2}). The 141,924 housing units averaged 132 per square mile (51/km^{2}). The racial makeup of the county was 87.0% White, 0.5% African American, 0.4% Native American, 0.7% Asian, 9.8% from other races, and 1.5% from two or more races. About 88.1% of the population was Hispanic or Latino of any race.

Of the 119,631 households, 50.3% had children under the age of 18 living with them, 60.80% were married couples living together, 20.0% had a female householder with no husband present, and 19.3% were not families. About 16.40% of all households were made up of individuals, and 7.30% had someone living alone who was 65 years of age or older. The average household size was 3.36, and the average family size was 3.80.

In the county, the age distribution was 33.0% under the age of18, 9.7% from 18 to 24, 25.6% from 25 to 44, 20.6% from 45 to 64, and 11.10% who were 65 or older. The median age was 30.6 years. For every 100 females, there were 91.90 males. For every 100 females aged 18 and over, there were 86.30 males.

The median income for a household in the county was $31,264, and for a family was $33,770. Males had a median income of $21,410 versus $15,597 for females. The per capita income for the county was $13,695. About 30.0% of families and 34.7% of the population were below the poverty line, including 46.8% of those under age 18 and 24.8% of those age 65 or over.

A 2000 Texas A&M study stated that of the residents of Cameron County, 43% do not have basic literacy skills.

Within the 2010s decade, a noticeable trend in the county population showed that growth among the county's northern cities (defined as major towns whose city limits lie entirely north or east of U.S. Highway 83 in the county) on average has been greater than those cities on U.S. Highway 83 in the county, suggesting a possible desire among both locals and new residents from outside the Rio Grande Valley to move away from the population centers of the county. This trend has also been shared by nearby Hidalgo County. Los Fresnos, for example, grew by 42.2% from 2010 to 2018. Other major cities, such as Indian Lake, Primera, and Rio Hondo, all grew by more than 15% in the same period. In contrast, the cities of Harlingen, La Feria, and San Benito, all cities along U.S. Highway 83, have seen growths less than 1% in the same period. The city that grew the most among the Highway 83 cities in the county was Brownsville, which grew by 4.4% from 2010 to 2019.

== Government and infrastructure ==
U.S. Immigration and Customs Enforcement operates the Port Isabel Service Processing Center, located in an unincorporated area adjacent to the Port Isabel-Cameron County Airport, which is itself owned and operated by the county. The airport has four runways and offers fuel and other general aviation services.

U.S. District Judge Andrew S. Hanen stated in 2013 that the corruption in the county judiciary and legal system was so pervasive that most people would not believe it "unless they heard it themselves."

== Government and politics ==
Cameron County has historically leaned toward the Democratic Party in presidential elections, supporting the party in all but three between 1960 and 2020. Republican candidate George W. Bush carried the county in the 2004 election, but no Republican would do so again until Donald Trump won in 2024. Many voters supported Trump while voting for down-ballot Democratic politicians. Trump outperformed Ted Cruz in the area in the 2024 election. Trump's 2016 showing of 32.0% was the lowest received by a Republican candidate in the county since Alf Landon in 1936. Four years later, however, Trump's performance of 43% in 2020 was the best for a Republican in the county since 2004, while in 2024, Trump won the county with a majority of 52.51% as part of the continued Republican trend in the Rio Grande Valley. The New York Times stated that Elon Musk placed significant economic development in the county, opposed illegal immigration, and did considerable campaigning for Trump in Cameron County, so "Mr. Trump didn't have to campaign very hard in Cameron."

In the Texas House of Representatives, Cameron County is covered by districts 35, 37, and 38.

United States presidential election results for Cameron County, Texas
Year	Republican		Democratic		Third party(ies)	
Year	No.	%	No.	%	No.	%
1912	149	6.13%	2,146	88.35%	134	5.52%
1916	420	24.48%	1,260	73.43%	36	2.10%
1920	909	49.24%	920	49.84%	17	0.92%
1924	1,266	34.52%	2,225	60.68%	176	4.80%
1928	3,544	52.45%	3,202	47.39%	11	0.16%
1932	1,785	19.87%	7,146	79.53%	54	0.60%
1936	2,160	26.32%	5,887	71.74%	159	1.94%
1940	3,370	35.73%	6,035	63.98%	28	0.30%
1944	5,309	44.82%	5,998	50.63%	539	4.55%
1948	4,689	39.54%	6,778	57.15%	392	3.31%
1952	14,018	64.89%	7,559	34.99%	25	0.12%
1956	11,952	56.85%	8,829	42.00%	241	1.15%
1960	10,190	45.01%	12,416	54.84%	34	0.15%
1964	9,531	37.14%	16,056	62.57%	72	0.28%
1968	11,759	39.82%	15,726	53.26%	2,042	6.92%
1972	20,816	60.69%	13,340	38.89%	144	0.42%
1976	16,448	39.06%	25,310	60.10%	353	0.84%
1980	22,041	47.62%	23,200	50.12%	1,044	2.26%
1984	29,545	52.64%	26,394	47.03%	187	0.33%
1988	24,263	43.68%	30,972	55.75%	317	0.57%
1992	20,123	34.07%	29,435	49.84%	9,499	16.08%
1996	18,434	32.63%	34,891	61.76%	3,168	5.61%
2000	27,800	44.80%	33,214	53.52%	1,043	1.68%
2004	34,801	50.32%	33,998	49.16%	357	0.52%
2008	26,671	35.06%	48,480	63.72%	926	1.22%
2012	26,099	33.94%	49,975	64.99%	821	1.07%
2016	29,472	31.80%	59,402	64.10%	3,791	4.09%
2020	49,032	42.89%	64,063	56.04%	1,231	1.08%
2024	60,991	52.51%	54,258	46.71%	904	0.78%

United States Senate election results for Cameron County, Texas1
Year	Republican		Democratic		Third party(ies)	
Year	No.	%	No.	%	No.	%
2024	53,391	46.63%	58,330	50.94%	2,789	2.44%

United States Senate election results for Cameron County, Texas2
Year	Republican		Democratic		Third party(ies)	
Year	No.	%	No.	%	No.	%
2020	46,482	41.79%	61,508	55.30%	3,233	2.91%
2026	30,541	29.93%	69,808	68.42%	1,683	1.65%

Texas Gubernatorial election results for Cameron County
Year	Republican		Democratic		Third party(ies)	
Year	No.	%	No.	%	No.	%
2022	34,290	44.48%	41,667	54.05%	1,138	1.48%
2026	33,101	32.22%	68,613	66.80%	1,005	0.98%

=== County government ===
Position	Name	Party
County Judge	Eddie Treviño	Democratic
Commissioner, Precinct 1	Sofia Benavides	Democratic
Commissioner, Precinct 2	Joey Lopez	Democratic
Commissioner, Precinct 3	David A. Garza	Democratic
Commissioner, Precinct 4	Gus Ruiz	Democratic
District Attorney	Luis V. Saenz	Democratic
District Clerk	Laura Perez-Reyes	Democratic
County Clerk	Sylvia Garza-Perez	Democratic
Sheriff	Manuel "Manny" Trevino	Democratic
Tax Assessor-Collector	Eddie Garcia	Democratic
Treasurer	David A. Betancourt	Democratic

== Education ==
Cameron County is served by several school districts. They include:

- Brownsville Independent School District
- Harlingen Consolidated Independent School District
- La Feria Independent School District
- Los Fresnos Consolidated Independent School District
- Lyford Consolidated Independent School District (partially)
- Point Isabel Independent School District
- Rio Hondo Independent School District
- San Benito Consolidated Independent School District
- Santa Maria Independent School District
- Santa Rosa Independent School District

In addition, residents are eligible to apply to South Texas Independent School District's magnet schools.

All of the county is in the service area of Texas Southmost College.

== Economy ==
Cameron County has been considered one of the poorest urban counties in the US.

The FAA approved SpaceX a private spaceport east of Brownsville on the Gulf Coast.

The SpaceX South Texas Launch Site was originally projected to employ 75–100 full-time workers in the early years with up to 150 full-time employees/contractors by 2019. In 2014, SpaceX acquired additional land near Boca Chica, which they consolidated into a subdivision called "Mars Crossing", possibly named after the novel by science-fiction writer Geoffrey A. Landis.

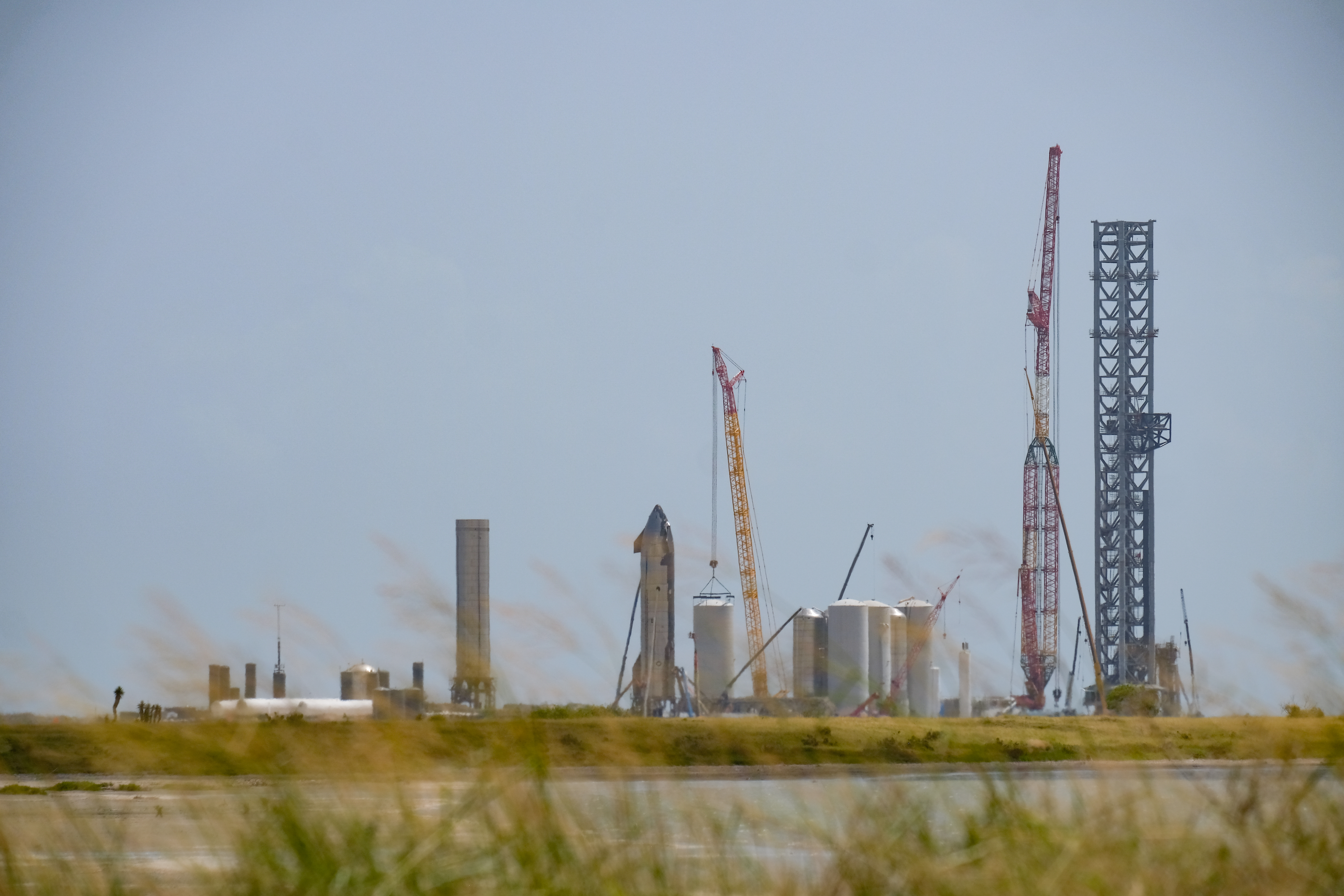
View of SpaceX's launch pad at Starbase

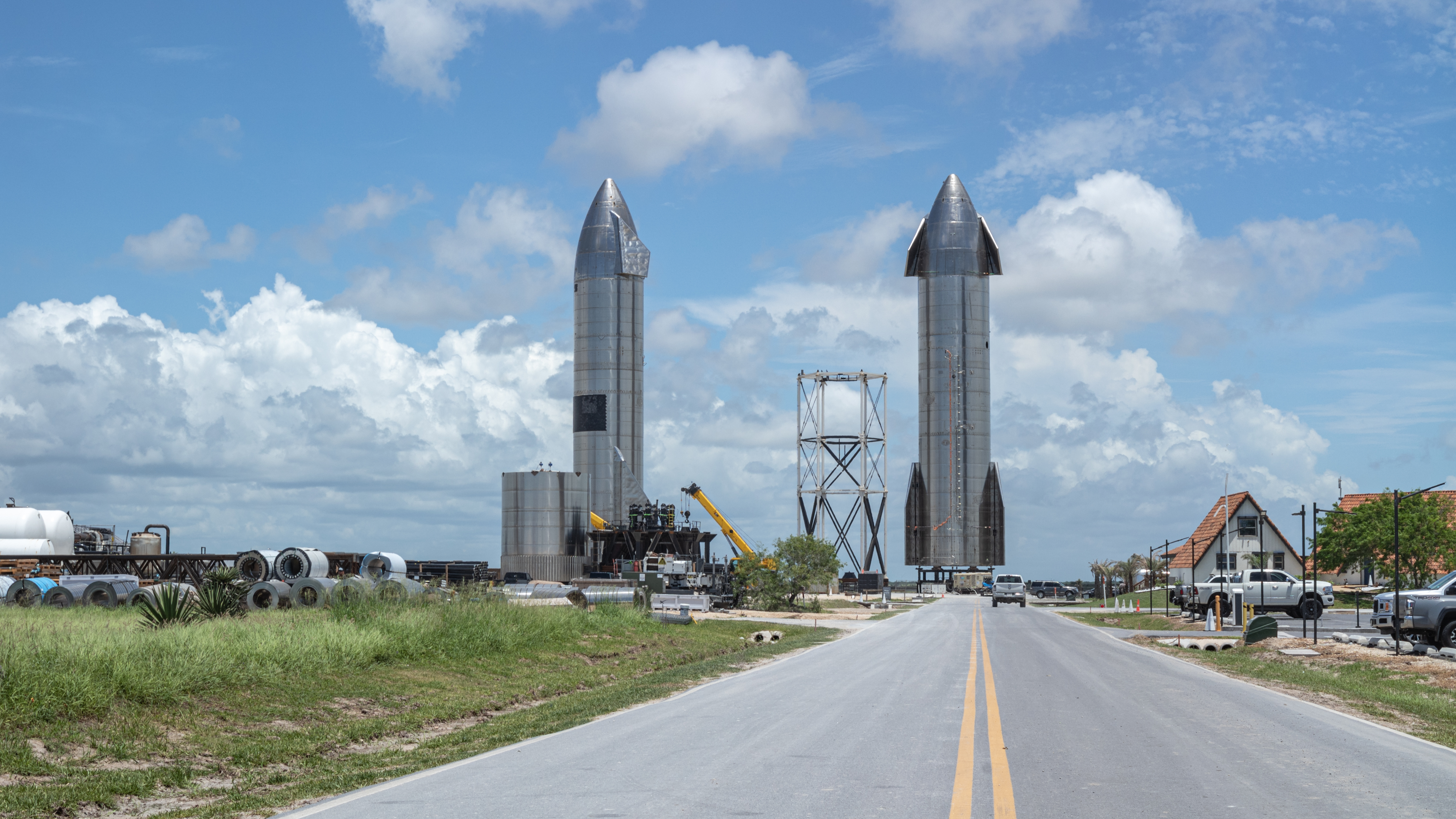
SN15 and SN16

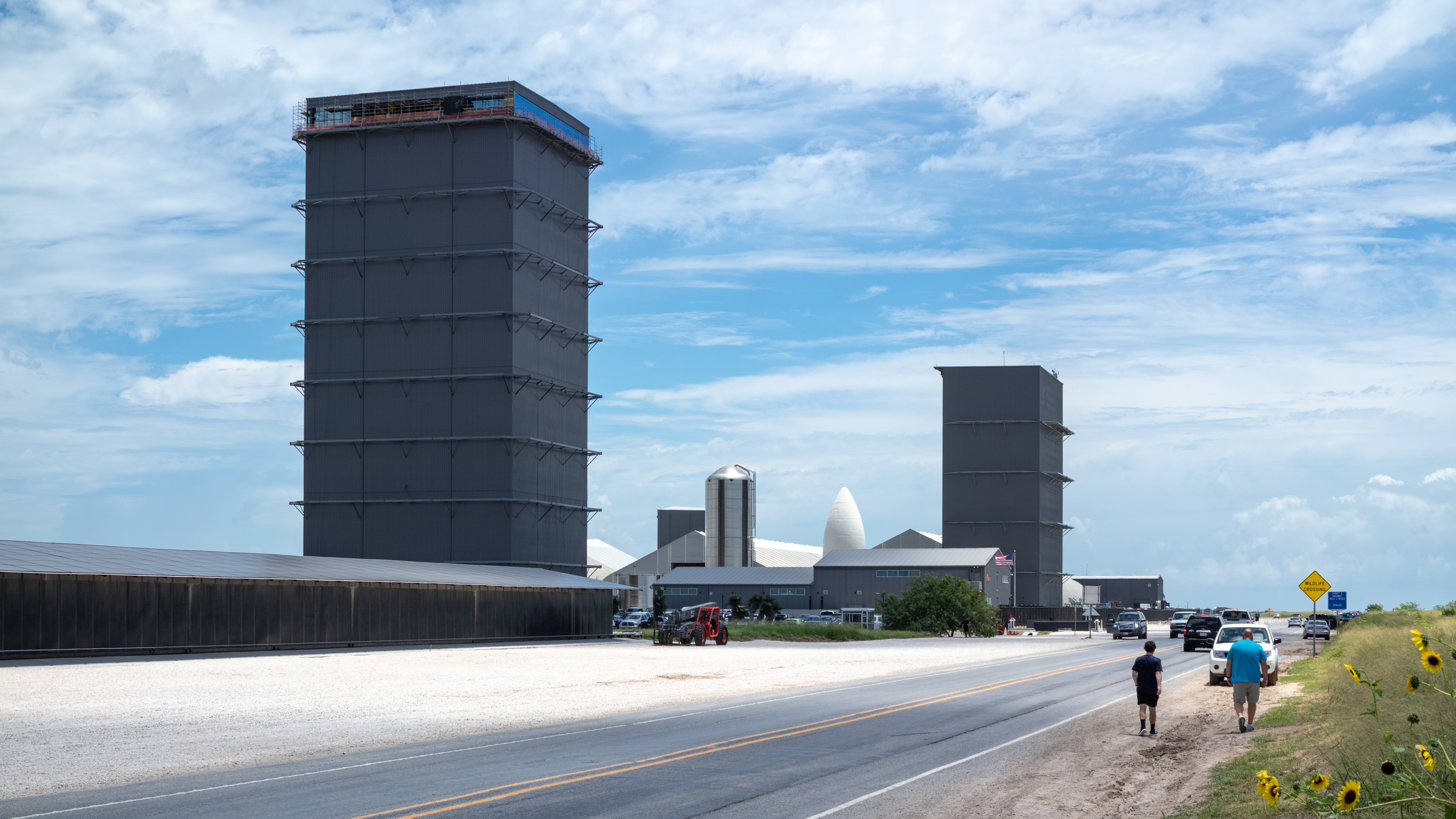
Starship and SuperHeavy production site

The southern cattle tick (Rhipicephalus microplus) is invasive here. Populations here have also become highly permethrin resistant. In 2014 the problem had become so severe that spread to neighboring counties was feared, and a Temporary Preventative Quarantine Area was established to preserve efficacy in those counties. All quarantine efforts have been somewhat unsuccessful, due at least in part to the ticks' infestation of wildlife including whitetail (Odocoileus virginianus).

== Media ==
=== Radio stations ===
- KFRQ 94.5FM
- KKPS 99.5FM
- KNVO 101.1FM
- KVLY 107.9FM
- KVMV 96.9FM

=== Newspapers ===
- The Brownsville Herald (A Freedom Communications, Inc. newspaper based in Brownsville, TX)
- Valley Morning Star (A Freedom Communications, Inc. newspaper based in Harlingen, TX)
- El Nuevo Heraldo (AIM Media Texas newspaper based in Brownsville, TX)

== Communities ==
=== Cities ===
- Brownsville (county seat)
- Harlingen
- La Feria
- Los Fresnos
- Palm Valley
- Port Isabel
- Rio Hondo
- San Benito
- Starbase

=== Towns ===
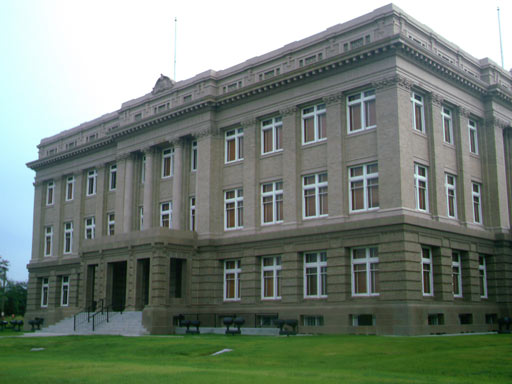
A picture of the Cameron County Courthouse (1912), the Dancy Building, in Brownsville, Texas, which served as the County Courthouse until the construction of a replacement: It was restored in 2006 and houses County Court at Law No 1, as well as some county offices.

- Bayview
- Combes
- Indian Lake
- Laguna Vista
- Los Indios
- Primera
- Rancho Viejo
- Santa Rosa
- South Padre Island

=== Village ===
- Rangerville

=== Census-designated places ===
- Arroyo Colorado Estates
- Arroyo Gardens
- Bixby
- Bluetown
- Cameron Park
- Chula Vista
- Del Mar Heights
- El Camino Angosto
- Encantada-Ranchito-El Calaboz
- Green Valley Farms
- Iglesia Antigua
- Juarez
- La Feria North
- La Paloma
- La Tina Ranch
- Lago
- Laguna Heights
- Las Palmas II
- Lasana
- Laureles
- Lozano
- Olmito
- Orason
- Palmer
- Ratamosa
- Reid Hope King
- Rice Tracts
- San Pedro
- Santa Maria
- Solis
- South Point
- Tierra Bonita
- Villa del Sol
- Villa Pancho
- Yznaga

=== Former census-designated places ===
- Arroyo Gardens-La Tina Ranch (split into the Arroyo Gardens and La Tina Ranch CDPs)
- Bluetown-Iglesia Antigua
- Chula Vista-Orason
- Grand Acres
- Las Palmas-Juarez

=== Other unincorporated communities ===
- Adams Gardens
- Arroyo Alto
- Arroyo City
- Buena Vista
- Carricitos
- Cavazos
- Holly Beach
- La Penusca
- Landrum
- Lantana
- Las Yescas
- Los Cuates
- Monte Grande
- Russelltown
- Villa Nueva

=== Ghost towns ===
- Del Mar
- La Leona
- Las Rusias
- Santa Rita
- Stuart Place

== See also ==
- List of museums in the Texas Gulf Coast
- National Register of Historic Places listings in Cameron County, Texas
- Recorded Texas Historic Landmarks in Cameron County
