= San Benito High School =

San Benito High School may refer to:

- San Benito High School (California), in Hollister, California
- San Benito High School (Texas), in San Benito, Texas
