= Indian Lake, Texas =

- Town
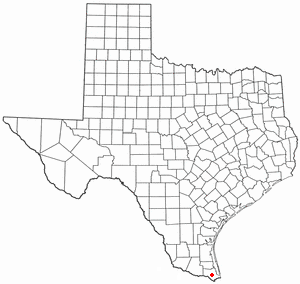
- Location of Indian Lake, Texas

- Coordinates: 26°5′16″N 97°30′9″W
- Country: United States
- State: Texas
- County: Cameron

Area
  - Total: 0.27 sq mi (0.71 km^{2})
  - Land: 0.23 sq mi (0.60 km^{2})
  - Water: 0.042 sq mi (0.11 km^{2})
- Elevation: 30 ft (9 m)

Population (2020)
  - Total: 839
  - Density: 3,600/sq mi (1,400/km^{2})
- Time zone: UTC-6 (Central (CST))
  - Summer (DST): UTC-5 (CDT)
- FIPS code: 48-35918
- GNIS feature ID: 1388581
- Website: http://www.townofindianlake.com/

Indian Lake is a town in Cameron County, Texas, United States. The population was 839 at the 2020 census. It may be included as part of the Brownsville–Harlingen–Raymondville and the Matamoros–Brownsville metropolitan areas.

== Geography ==
Indian Lake is located at 26°5′16″N 97°30′9″W (26.087651, –97.502470).

According to the United States Census Bureau, the town has a total area of 0.3 square miles (0.78 km^{2}), of which 0.2 square miles (0.52 km^{2}) is land and 0.1 square miles (0.26 km^{2}) (19.23%) is water.

== Demographics ==
Historical population
Census	Pop.	Note	%±
1990	390		—
2000	541		38.7%
2010	640		18.3%
2020	839		31.1%
U.S. Decennial Census

=== 2020 census ===
Indian Lake racial composition (NH = Non-Hispanic) (Note: Note: the US Census treats Hispanic/Latino as an ethnic category. This table excludes Latinos from the racial categories and assigns them to a separate category. Hispanics/Latinos can be of any race.)
Race	Number	Percentage
White (NH)	125	14.9%
Black or African American (NH)	3	0.36%
Pacific Islander (NH)	1	0.12%
Some Other Race (NH)	3	0.36%
Mixed/Multi-Racial (NH)	6	0.72%
Hispanic or Latino	701	83.55%
Total	839	

As of the 2020 United States census, there were 839 people, 332 households, and 239 families residing in the town.

=== 2000 census ===
As of the census of 2000, there were 541 people, 229 households, and 158 families residing in the town. The population density was 2,602.6 inhabitants per square mile (1,004.9/km^{2}). There were 345 housing units at an average density of 1,659.7 per square mile (640.8/km^{2}). The racial makeup of the town was 82.81% White, 0.92% Native American, 0.37% Asian, 0.37% Pacific Islander, 13.49% from other races, and 2.03% from two or more races. Hispanic or Latino of any race were 43.07% of the population.

There were 229 households, out of which 24.9% had children under the age of 18 living with them, 58.5% were married couples living together, 7.9% had a female householder with no husband present, and 31.0% were non-families. 25.8% of all households were made up of individuals, and 16.6% had someone living alone who was 65 years of age or older. The average household size was 2.36 and the average family size was 2.82.

In the town, the population was spread out, with 22.0% under the age of 18, 4.4% from 18 to 24, 22.4% from 25 to 44, 19.8% from 45 to 64, and 31.4% who were 65 years of age or older. The median age was 46 years. For every 100 females, there were 94.6 males. For every 100 females age 18 and over, there were 91.0 males.

The median income for a household in the town was $23,269, and the median income for a family was $26,563. Males had a median income of $21,250 versus $12,279 for females. The per capita income for the town was $12,129. About 13.8% of families and 14.3% of the population were below the poverty line, including 16.3% of those under age 18 and 5.1% of those age 65 or over.

== Education ==
Indian Lake is served by the Los Fresnos Consolidated Independent School District.

In addition, South Texas Independent School District operates magnet schools that serve Indian Lake and many surrounding communities.
