= Adams Gardens, Texas =

- Unincorporated community
- Location within Texas Location within the United States
- Coordinates: 26°10′6″N 97°47′33″W
- Country: United States
- State: Texas
- County: Cameron
- Elevation: 56 ft (17 m)
- Time zone: UTC-6 (Central (CST))
  - Summer (DST): UTC-5 (CDT)
- Area code: 956
- GNIS feature ID: 2034642

Adams Gardens is an unincorporated community in Cameron County, Texas, United States. According to the Handbook of Texas, the community had a population of 200 in 2000. It is located within the Rio Grande Valley and the Brownsville-Harlingen metropolitan area.

== History ==
Adams Gardens was founded in 1972 and incorporated. The Harlingen water district and post office both served the community. Its population was 200 from 1978 through 2000. The community is a mobile home park that can accommodate up to 230 homes. Adams Gardens has a board of directors with nine members and a yearly-elected president.

== Geography ==
Adams Gardens is located off U.S. Highway 83 on the Missouri Pacific Railroad, 1 mile (1.6 km) northeast of La Feria in western Cameron County.

== Education ==
Today, the community is served by the La Feria Independent School District. Children in the community attend Sam Houston Elementary School, W B Green Junior High School, and La Feria High School.
