= Russelltown, Texas =

- Unincorporated community
- Location within Texas Location within the United States
- Coordinates: 26°4′58″N 97°34′55″W
- Country: United States
- State: Texas
- County: Cameron
- Elevation: 39 ft (12 m)
- Time zone: UTC-6 (Central (CST))
  - Summer (DST): UTC-5 (CDT)
- Area code: 956
- GNIS feature ID: 1380910

Russelltown is an unincorporated community in Cameron County, Texas, United States. It is located within the Rio Grande Valley and the Brownsville-Harlingen metropolitan area.

== Education ==
Russelltown had its own school in 1947. Today, the community is served by the Brownsville Independent School District. Children in the community attend Villa Nueva Elementary School, Stillman Middle School, and Veterans Memorial Early College High School.
