= Villa Nueva, Texas =

- Unincorporated community
- Location within Texas Location within the United States
- Coordinates: 25°57′3″N 97°33′22″W
- Country: United States
- State: Texas
- County: Cameron
- Elevation: 36 ft (11 m)
- Time zone: UTC-6 (Central (CST))
  - Summer (DST): UTC-5 (CDT)
- Area code: 956
- GNIS feature ID: 1376592

Villa Nueva is an unincorporated community in Cameron County, Texas, United States. According to the Handbook of Texas, the community had a population of 402 in 2000. It is located within the Rio Grande Valley and the Brownsville-Harlingen metropolitan area.

== History ==
A cemetery and several scattered houses were the only signs of human habitation in Villa Nueva in the early 1930s. A church was erected in 1956. There were 63 houses in 1983, then 20 more homes were built three years later. Its population was 374 that year, then grew to 402 in 2000. The community was served by the Military Highway Water Supply Corporation.

== Geography ==
Villa Nueva is located at the intersection of U.S. Highway 281 and Farm to Market Road 3248, 2 miles (3.2 km) west of Brownsville in extreme southern Cameron County.

== Education ==
Today, the community is served by the Brownsville Independent School District. Children in the community attend Villa Nueva Elementary School, Stillman Middle School, and Veterans Memorial Early College High School.
