= Jeremy Springer =

American football player and coach (born 1989)

New England Patriots
- Title: Special teams coordinator

Personal information
- Born: February 22, 1989 (age 37); Harlingen, Texas, U.S.
- Listed height: 6 ft 3 in (1.91 m)
- Listed weight: 230 lb (104 kg)

Career information
- Position: Linebacker
- High school: Los Fresnos (TX)
- College: UTEP (2007–2011)

Career history
- UTEP (2011–2012) Assistant in football operations; UTEP (2013–2014) Graduate assistant; Texas A&M (2015–2017) Special teams quality control coach; Arizona (2018–2020) Special teams coordinator; Marshall (2021) Special teams coordinator; Los Angeles Rams (2022–2023) Assistant special teams coach; New England Patriots (2024–present) Special teams coordinator

Jeremy Shane Springer (born February 22, 1989) is an American football coach who is the special teams coordinator for the New England Patriots of the National Football League (NFL). He played college football for the UTEP Miners and previously coached them, the Texas A&M Aggies, Arizona Wildcats, Marshall Thundering Herd and Los Angeles Rams.

== Early life ==
Springer was born on February 22, 1989, in Harlingen, Texas. He attended Los Fresnos High School and played football, basketball and track & field. He played wide receiver through his junior year before switching to quarterback and becoming starter as a senior in 2006. He played with his twin brother at Los Fresnos and set school records for single season passing yards and points scored. He totaled in his senior year 3,489 passing yards and 42 touchdowns while running for 632 yards and 15 touchdowns, being named all-state and the district player of the year. Off the field, Springer was a member of the National Honor Society and was listed in Who's Who Among American High School Students.

Springer committed to play college football for the UTEP Miners. He redshirted as a freshman in 2007. The following year, he played three games as a backup quarterback but threw no passes. He moved to middle linebacker in 2009 and started all of their games, having 66 tackles, third-most on the team, and three pass breakups. He had 25 tackles in 2010 and was voted a team captain as a senior in 2011. He totaled 161 tackles and an interception in his collegiate career.

== Coaching career ==
=== UTEP ===
While still playing at UTEP in 2011, Springer served as an assistant in football operations for the team. He served in this position through 2012, and from 2013 to 2014 was a graduate assistant working with special teams and the defensive line.

=== Texas A&M ===
In 2015, he joined the Texas A&M Aggies as a special teams quality control coach, working with Jeff Banks, who had been on the UTEP staff while Springer was still a player.

=== Arizona ===
In 2018, Springer joined the Arizona Wildcats as special teams coordinator.

=== Marshall ===
In 2021, he was hired to be the special teams coordinator for the Marshall Thundering Herd in 2021.

=== Los Angeles Rams ===
Although initially reported to have joined the Ole Miss Rebels as special teams coordinator in 2022, Springer ultimately entered the professional ranks by becoming assistant special teams coach for the Los Angeles Rams of the National Football League (NFL).

=== New England Patriots ===
Following two years with the Rams, Springer was named the special teams coordinator of the New England Patriots in 2024 under head coach Jerod Mayo, and was retained upon the hiring of Mike Vrabel the next season.
