= Palm Valley, Cameron County, Texas =

Palm Valley, Texas
- City
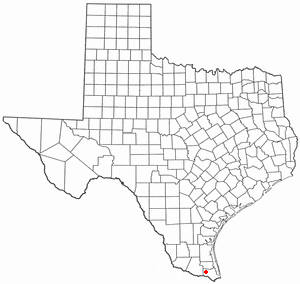
- Location of Palm Valley, Texas

- Coordinates: 26°12′13″N 97°45′14″W
- Country: United States
- State: Texas
- County: Cameron
- Incorporated: September 11, 1980

Area
  - Total: 0.61 sq mi (1.58 km^{2})
  - Land: 0.60 sq mi (1.55 km^{2})
  - Water: 0.015 sq mi (0.04 km^{2})
- Elevation: 43 ft (13 m)

Population (2020)
  - Total: 1,413
  - Density: 2,360/sq mi (912/km^{2})
- Time zone: UTC-6 (Central (CST))
  - Summer (DST): UTC-5 (CDT)
- FIPS code: 48-54798
- GNIS feature ID: 1388564
- Website: www.palmvalleytx.gov

Palm Valley is a city in Cameron County, Texas, United States. The population was 1,413 at the 2020 census. It is part of the Brownsville–Harlingen–Raymondville and the Matamoros–Brownsville metropolitan areas.

== Geography ==
Palm Valley is located at 26°12′13″N 97°45′14″W (26.203585, –97.754013).

According to the United States Census Bureau, the city has a total area of 0.6 square miles (1.6 km^{2}), all land.

== Demographics ==
Historical population
| Census | Pop. | Note | %± |
|---|---|---|---|
| 1990 | 1,199 | | — |
| 2000 | 1,298 | | 8.3% |
| 2010 | 1,304 | | 0.5% |
| 2020 | 1,413 | | 8.4% |
U.S. Decennial Census; 1850–1900 1910; 1920 1930 1940; 1950 1960 1970; 1980 1990 2000; 2010

Palm Valley CDP, Texas – Racial and ethnic composition Note: the US Census treats Hispanic/Latino as an ethnic category. This table excludes Latinos from the racial categories and assigns them to a separate category. Hispanics/Latinos may be of any race.
| Race / Ethnicity (NH = Non-Hispanic) | Pop 2020 | % 2020 |
|---|---|---|
| White alone (NH) | 717 | 50.74% |
| Black or African American alone (NH) | 13 | 0.92% |
| Native American or Alaska Native alone (NH) | 1 | 0.07% |
| Asian alone (NH) | 26 | 1.84% |
| Pacific Islander alone (NH) | 3 | 0.21% |
| Other race alone (NH) | 4 | 0.28% |
| Mixed race or Multiracial (NH) | 30 | 2.12% |
| Hispanic or Latino (any race) | 619 | 43.81% |
| Total | 1,413 | 100.00% |

As of the 2020 United States census, there were 1,413 people, 805 households, and 555 families residing in the city.

=== 2000 census ===
As of the census of 2000, there were 1,298 people, 610 households, and 434 families residing in the city. The population density was 2,081.4 inhabitants per square mile (803.6/km^{2}). There were 705 housing units at an average density of 1,130.5 per square mile (436.5/km^{2}). The racial makeup of the city was 96.07% White, 0.39% African American, 1.08% Asian, 0.08% Pacific Islander, 1.16% from other races, and 1.23% from two or more races. Hispanic or Latino of any race were 12.63% of the population.

There were 610 households, out of which 15.1% had children under the age of 18 living with them, 66.2% were married couples living together, 3.8% had a female householder with no husband present, and 28.7% were non-families. 25.4% of all households were made up of individuals, and 17.2% had someone living alone who was 65 years of age or older. The average household size was 2.13 and the average family size was 2.50.

In the city, the population was spread out, with 13.0% under the age of 18, 2.7% from 18 to 24, 16.6% from 25 to 44, 29.0% from 45 to 64, and 38.8% who were 65 years of age or older. The median age was 57 years. For every 100 females, there were 91.2 males. For every 100 females age 18 and over, there were 86.9 males.

The median income for a household in the city was $66,750, and the median income for a family was $74,868. Males had a median income of $53,500 versus $35,208 for females. The per capita income for the city was $40,867. About 0.7% of families and 1.2% of the population were below the poverty line, including none of those under age 18 and 1.8% of those age 65 or over.

== Education ==
Palm Valley is served by the Harlingen Consolidated Independent School District.

In addition, residents are eligible to apply to South Texas Independent School District's magnet schools.
