= Los Indios, Texas =

- Town
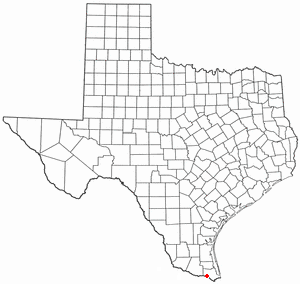
- Location of Los Indios, Texas

- Coordinates: 26°2′59″N 97°44′25″W
- Country: United States
- State: Texas
- County: Cameron
- Founded: 1913

Area
  - Total: 1.88 sq mi (4.88 km^{2})
  - Land: 1.88 sq mi (4.86 km^{2})
  - Water: 0.0077 sq mi (0.02 km^{2})
- Elevation: 56 ft (17 m)

Population (2020)
  - Total: 1,008
  - Density: 565.3/sq mi (218.26/km^{2})
- Time zone: UTC-6 (Central (CST))
  - Summer (DST): UTC-5 (CDT)
- ZIP code: 78567
- Area code: 956
- FIPS code: 48-44128
- GNIS feature ID: 1374728

Los Indios is a U.S. border town in Cameron County, Texas. The population was 1,008 at the 2020 census. It is included as part of the Brownsville–Harlingen–Raymondville and the Matamoros–Brownsville metropolitan areas. The Free Trade International Bridge connects Los Indios with Matamoros, Tamaulipas.

== History ==
Los Indios is likely named after a Spanish ranch and got its start in the year 1913, following construction of the San Benito and Rio Grande Valley Railway through that territory. Los Indios was incorporated in 1995; as of February 2025, it was the most recent town to be incorporated in Cameron County.

== Geography ==
Los Indios is located at 26°2′59″N 97°44′25″W (26.049729, –97.740140).

According to the United States Census Bureau, the town has a total area of 1.7 square miles (4.4 km^{2}), all land.

== Demographics ==
Historical population
Census	Pop.	Note	%±
2000	1,149		—
2010	1,083		−5.7%
2020	1,008		−6.9%

=== 2020 census ===
Los Indios racial composition (NH = Non-Hispanic) (Note: Note: the US Census treats Hispanic/Latino as an ethnic category. This table excludes Latinos from the racial categories and assigns them to a separate category. Hispanics/Latinos can be of any race.)
Race	Number	Percentage
White (NH)	41	4.07%
Black or African American (NH)	1	0.1%
Pacific Islander (NH)	1	0.1%
Some Other Race (NH)	3	0.3%
Hispanic or Latino	962	95.44%
Total	1,008	

As of the 2020 United States census, there were 1,008 people, 232 households, and 169 families residing in the town.

=== 2000 census ===
As of the census of 2000, there were 1,149 people, 273 households, and 245 families residing in the town. The population density was 668.0 inhabitants per square mile (257.9/km^{2}). There were 310 housing units at an average density of 180.2 per square mile (69.6/km^{2}). The racial makeup of the town was 53.79% White, 0.17% African American, 0.09% Native American, 43.95% from other races, and 2.00% from two or more races. Hispanic or Latino of any race were 95.82% of the population.

There were 273 households, out of which 56.8% had children under the age of 18 living with them, 64.1% were married couples living together, 21.2% had a female householder with no husband present, and 9.9% were non-families. 9.5% of all households were made up of individuals, and 4.8% had someone living alone who was 65 years of age or older. The average household size was 4.21 and the average family size was 4.46.

In the town, the population was spread out, with 39.9% under the age of 18, 11.0% from 18 to 24, 26.5% from 25 to 44, 15.5% from 45 to 64, and 7.2% who were 65 years of age or older. The median age was 24 years. For every 100 females, there were 84.4 males. For every 100 females age 18 and over, there were 80.9 males.

The median income for a household in the town was $19,702, and the median income for a family was $20,000. Males had a median income of $16,429 versus $12,014 for females. The per capita income for the town was $5,711. About 45.0% of families and 47.2% of the population were below the poverty line, including 57.1% of those under age 18 and 52.1% of those age 65 or over.

Los Indios hosts the only border crossing allowed for use by transmigrantes. Transmigrantes are those bringing cargo overland through Mexico to Central America, as opposed to cargo that has Mexico as its final destination. Most of this cargo being brought overland to Central America is in the form of used vehicles. Guatemala is the most common destination, with some cargo headed for Honduras and other Central American countries. Frequently there will be an early morning line of 200 plus vehicles waiting to cross the border at Los Indios, bound for Central America. The route through Mexico to the Guatemalan border at Ciudad Hidalgo is about 1,350 miles (2,170 km), virtually all two lane roads running through the centers of towns with heavy truck traffic during the day—a challenging journey even for an experienced transmigrante.

== Climate ==
Climate data for Los Indios, Texas, 1991–2020 normals, extremes 1914–present
Month	Jan	Feb	Mar	Apr	May	Jun	Jul	Aug	Sep	Oct	Nov	Dec	Year
Record high °F (°C)	83 (28)	87 (31)	91 (33)	94 (34)	96 (36)	98 (37)	99 (37)	99 (37)	98 (37)	94 (34)	90 (32)	85 (29)	99 (37)
Mean maximum °F (°C)	70 (21)	72 (22)	78 (26)	83 (28)	88 (31)	94 (34)	95 (35)	94 (34)	89 (32)	83 (28)	76 (24)	70 (21)	95 (35)
Mean daily maximum °F (°C)	70.7 (21.5)	74.9 (23.8)	79.9 (26.6)	85.2 (29.6)	90.0 (32.2)	94.2 (34.6)	95.4 (35.2)	96.5 (35.8)	91.8 (33.2)	87.1 (30.6)	78.8 (26.0)	72.0 (22.2)	84.7 (29.3)
Mean daily minimum °F (°C)	50 (10)	54 (12)	60 (16)	66 (19)	70 (21)	73 (23)	73 (23)	73 (23)	71 (22)	66 (19)	58 (14)	54 (12)	64 (18)
Mean minimum °F (°C)	50.4 (10.2)	54.2 (12.3)	59.4 (15.2)	65.4 (18.6)	71.5 (21.9)	75.4 (24.1)	76.2 (24.6)	76.4 (24.7)	73.1 (22.8)	66.2 (19.0)	58.0 (14.4)	51.6 (10.9)	50.4 (10.2)
Record low °F (°C)	38 (3)	40 (4)	45 (7)	52 (11)	61 (16)	70 (21)	73 (23)	73 (23)	62 (17)	52 (11)	43 (6)	38 (3)	38 (3)
Average precipitation inches (mm)	0.67 (17)	0.39 (9.9)	0.55 (14)	0.47 (12)	1.06 (27)	1.35 (34)	1.57 (40)	0.75 (19)	1.89 (48)	1.38 (35)	0.75 (19)	0.63 (16)	11.46 (290.9)
Average snowfall inches (cm)	0.0 (0.0)	0.1 (0.25)	0.0 (0.0)	0.0 (0.0)	0.0 (0.0)	0.0 (0.0)	0.0 (0.0)	0.0 (0.0)	0.0 (0.0)	0.0 (0.0)	0.0 (0.0)	0.0 (0.0)	0.1 (0.25)
Average precipitation days (≥ 0.01 in)	9.1	6.9	7.3	8.7	9.0	9.6	7.3	8.8	16.1	10.0	10.1	8.4	111.3
Average snowy days (≥ 0.1 in)	0.0	0.1	0.0	0.0	0.0	0.0	0.0	0.0	0.0	0.0	0.0	0.0	0.1

== Education ==
Los Indios is located in the San Benito Consolidated Independent School District.

In addition, South Texas Independent School District operates magnet schools that serve the community.

== Government and infrastructure ==
The United States Postal Service operates the Los Indios Post Office along U.S. Highway 281.
