= Santa Rosa Independent School District =

School district in Texas, United States

Address
- 102 Jesus R Cruz Santa Rosa, Texas, 78593; United States

District information
- Grades: PK–12
- Schools: 3
- NCES District ID: 4839360

Students and staff
- Students: 931 (2023–2024)
- Teachers: 89.54 (on an FTE basis)
- Student–teacher ratio: 10.40:1

Other information
- Website: www.srtx.org

Santa Rosa Independent School District is a public school district based in Santa Rosa, Texas. Their rivals are La Feria. Their mascot is the Warrior and their school colors are black and gold.

In addition to Santa Rosa, the district serves the community of Grand Acres and the census-designated place of Tierra Bonita, as well as a portion of the Yznaga CDP.

Santa Rosa ISD has three campuses: Santa Rosa High School (grades 9–12), Jo Nelson Middle School (grades 6–8), and Elma E. Barrera Elementary (prekindergarten - grade 5).

In 2009, the school district was rated "academically acceptable" by the Texas Education Agency.

The district changed to a four-day school week in fall 2022.
