= El Camino Angosto, Texas =

- Census-designated place
- Coordinates: 26°6′46″N 97°38′33″W
- Country: United States
- State: Texas
- County: Cameron

Area
  - Total: 0.32 sq mi (0.84 km^{2})
  - Land: 0.32 sq mi (0.84 km^{2})
  - Water: 0 sq mi (0.0 km^{2})
- Elevation: 36 ft (11 m)

Population (2020)
  - Total: 186
  - Density: 570/sq mi (220/km^{2})
- Time zone: UTC-6 (Central (CST))
  - Summer (DST): UTC-5 (CDT)
- FIPS code: 48-22858
- GNIS feature ID: 1852703

El Camino Angosto is a census-designated place (CDP) in Cameron County, Texas, United States. The population was 186 at the 2020 census. It is part of the Brownsville–Harlingen Metropolitan Statistical Area.

== Geography ==
El Camino Angosto is located in west-central Cameron County at 26°6′46″N 97°38′33″W (26.112751, -97.642585). It is bordered to the north by the city of San Benito.

According to the United States Census Bureau, the CDP has a total area of 0.32 square miles (0.84 km^{2}), all land.

== Demographics ==
Historical population
Census	Pop.	Note	%±
2000	254		—
2010	253		−0.4%
2020	186		−26.5%
U.S. Decennial Census; 1850–1900 1910; 1920 1930 1940; 1950 1960 1970; 1980 1990 2000; 2010 2020

El Camino Angosto first appeared as a census designated place in the 2000 U.S. census.

=== 2020 census ===
El Camino Angosto CDP, Texas – Racial and ethnic composition Note: the US Census treats Hispanic/Latino as an ethnic category. This table excludes Latinos from the racial categories and assigns them to a separate category. Hispanics/Latinos may be of any race.
Race / Ethnicity (NH = Non-Hispanic)	Pop 2000	Pop 2010	Pop 2020	% 2000	% 2010	% 2020
White alone (NH)	2	13	10	0.79%	5.14%	5.38%
Black or African American alone (NH)	0	0	0	0.00%	0.00%	0.00%
Native American or Alaska Native alone (NH)	0	0	0	0.00%	0.00%	0.00%
Asian alone (NH)	0	0	0	0.00%	0.00%	0.00%
Native Hawaiian or Pacific Islander alone (NH)	0	0	0	0.00%	0.00%	0.00%
Other race alone (NH)	0	0	4	0.00%	0.00%	2.15%
Mixed race or Multiracial (NH)	0	0	3	0.00%	0.00%	1.61%
Hispanic or Latino (any race)	252	240	169	99.21%	94.86%	90.86%
Total	254	253	186	100.00%	100.00%	100.00%

As of the census of 2000, there were 254 people, 64 households, and 57 families residing in the CDP. The population density was 683.8 inhabitants per square mile (264.0/km^{2}). There were 70 housing units at an average density of 188.5 per square mile (72.8/km^{2}). The racial makeup of the CDP was 23.23% White, 76.77% from other races. Hispanic or Latino of any race were 99.21% of the population.

There were 64 households, out of which 50.0% had children under the age of 18 living with them, 75.0% were married couples living together, 9.4% had a female householder with no husband present, and 10.9% were non-families. 7.8% of all households were made up of individuals, and 4.7% had someone living alone who was 65 years of age or older. The average household size was 3.97 and the average family size was 4.19.

In the CDP, the population was spread out, with 35.0% under the age of 18, 9.4% from 18 to 24, 31.9% from 25 to 44, 15.4% from 45 to 64, and 8.3% who were 65 years of age or older. The median age was 28 years. For every 100 females, there were 100.0 males. For every 100 females age 18 and over, there were 89.7 males.

The median income for a household in the CDP was $26,053, and the median income for a family was $26,645. Males had a median income of $26,579 versus $8,795 for females. The per capita income for the CDP was $8,749. About 28.1% of families and 44.7% of the population were below the poverty line, including 57.5% of those under the age of eighteen and 25.8% of those 65 or over.

== Education ==
El Camino Angosto is served by the San Benito Consolidated Independent School District.

In addition, South Texas Independent School District operates magnet schools that serve the community.
