= Villa Pancho, Texas =

- Census-designated place
- Coordinates: 25°53′2″N 97°24′47″W
- Country: United States
- State: Texas
- County: Cameron

Area
  - Total: 0.27 sq mi (0.7 km^{2})
  - Land: 0.27 sq mi (0.7 km^{2})
  - Water: 0 sq mi (0.0 km^{2})
- Elevation: 13 ft (4 m)

Population (2020)
  - Total: 467
  - Density: 1,700/sq mi (670/km^{2})
- Time zone: UTC-6 (Central (CST))
  - Summer (DST): UTC-5 (CDT)
- FIPS code: 48-75614
- GNIS feature ID: 1852778

Villa Pancho is a census-designated place (CDP) in Cameron County, Texas, United States. The population was 467 at the 2020 census, up from 788 at the 2010 census. It is part of the Brownsville–Harlingen Metropolitan Statistical Area.

== Geography ==
Villa Pancho is located in southern Cameron County at 25°53′02″N 97°24′47″W. It is surrounded by the city of Brownsville and is about 6 miles (10 km) east of the city center.

According to the United States Census Bureau, the CDP has a total area of 0.3 square miles (0.7 km^{2}), all land.

== Demographics ==
Historical population
Census	Pop.	Note	%±
2000	386		—
2010	788		104.1%
2020	467		−40.7%
U.S. Decennial Census; 1850–1900 1910; 1920 1930 1940; 1950 1960 1970; 1980 1990 2000; 2010 2020

Villa Pancho first appeared as a census designated place in the 2000 U.S. census.

=== 2020 census ===
Villa Pancho CDP, Texas – Racial and ethnic composition Note: the US Census treats Hispanic/Latino as an ethnic category. This table excludes Latinos from the racial categories and assigns them to a separate category. Hispanics/Latinos may be of any race.
Race / Ethnicity (NH = Non-Hispanic)	Pop 2000	Pop 2010	Pop 2020	% 2000	% 2010	% 2020
White alone (NH)	18	28	9	4.66%	3.55%	1.93%
Black or African American alone (NH)	0	0	0	0.00%	0.00%	0.00%
Native American or Alaska Native alone (NH)	0	0	2	0.00%	0.00%	0.43%
Asian alone (NH)	0	0	0	0.00%	0.00%	0.00%
Native Hawaiian or Pacific Islander alone (NH)	1	0	0	0.26%	0.00%	0.00%
Other race alone (NH)	0	0	1	0.00%	0.00%	0.21%
Mixed race or Multiracial (NH)	0	1	2	0.00%	0.13%	0.43%
Hispanic or Latino (any race)	367	759	453	95.08%	96.32%	97.00%
Total	386	788	467	100.00%	100.00%	100.00%

At the 2000 census, there were 386 people, 96 households and 86 families residing in the CDP. The population density was 1,277.3 inhabitants per square mile (493.2/km^{2}). There were 107 housing units at an average density of 354.1 per square mile (136.7/km^{2}). The racial makeup of the CDP was 97.93% White, 0.26% Pacific Islander, 1.81% from other races. Hispanic or Latino of any race were 95.08% of the population.

There were 96 households, of which 67.7% had children under the age of 18 living with them, 60.4% were married couples living together, 20.8% had a female householder with no husband present, and 9.4% were non-families. 7.3% of all households were made up of individuals, and 2.1% had someone living alone who was 65 years of age or older. The average household size was 4.02 and the average family size was 4.18.

Age distribution was 42.5% under the age of 18, 12.7% from 18 to 24, 27.2% from 25 to 44, 13.0% from 45 to 64, and 4.7% who were 65 years of age or older. The median age was 23 years. For every 100 females, there were 90.1 males. For every 100 females age 18 and over, there were 85.0 males.

The median household income was $12,500, and the median family income was $13,472. Males had a median income of $14,625 versus $11,786 for females. The per capita income for the CDP was $5,685. About 55.7% of families and 46.7% of the population were below the poverty line, including 51.3% of those under age 18 and 58.5% of those age 65 or over.

== Education ==
Villa Pancho is served by the Brownsville Independent School District.

In addition, South Texas Independent School District operates magnet schools that serve the community.
