= Encantada-Ranchito-El Calaboz, Texas =

- Census-designated place
- Location within the state of Texas
- Coordinates: 26°1′44″N 97°38′5″W
- Country: United States
- State: Texas
- County: Cameron

Area
  - Total: 2.92 sq mi (7.57 km^{2})
  - Land: 2.90 sq mi (7.52 km^{2})
  - Water: 0.019 sq mi (0.05 km^{2})
- Elevation: 50 ft (15 m)

Population (2020)
  - Total: 1,981
  - Density: 682/sq mi (263/km^{2})
- Time zone: UTC-6 (Central (CST))
  - Summer (DST): UTC-5 (CDT)
- FIPS code: 48-24223

Encantada-Ranchito-El Calaboz, also known as El Calaboz Rancheria in the San Pedro de Carricitos Land Grant, is a census-designated place (CDP) in Cameron County, Texas, United States. The population was 1,981 at the 2020 census. It is part of the Brownsville–Harlingen Metropolitan Statistical Area.

== Geography ==
The Encantada-Ranchito-El Calaboz is located in southwestern Cameron County at 26°1′44″N 97°38′5″W (26.028788, -97.634814). El Calaboz is located in the western part of the CDP, and Ranchito is in the east. La Encantada Elementary School is located in the Ranchito section of the CDP. The community is bordered by the city limits of Brownsville to the east and south and by the Rio Grande, which forms the Mexico–United States border, to the southwest.

U.S. Route 281 passes through the community. La Paloma is 2 miles (3 km) to the west, and downtown Brownsville is 14 miles (23 km) to the southeast.

According to the United States Census Bureau, the CDP has a total area of 2.92 square miles (7.57 km^{2}), of which 2.90 square miles (7.52 km^{2}) is land and 0.019 square miles (0.05 km^{2}), or 0.71%, is water.

== Demographics ==
Historical population
| Census | Pop. | Note | %± |
|---|---|---|---|
| 1990 | 1,143 | | — |
| 2000 | 2,100 | | 83.7% |
| 2010 | 2,255 | | 7.4% |
| 2020 | 1,981 | | −12.2% |
U.S. Decennial Census; 1850–1900 1910; 1920 1930 1940; 1950 1960 1970; 1980 1990 2000; 2010 2020

Encantada-Ranchito-El Calaboz first appeared as a census designated place in the 1990 U.S. census.

=== 2020 census ===
Encantada-Ranchito-El Calaboz CDP, Texas – Racial and ethnic composition Note: the US Census treats Hispanic/Latino as an ethnic category. This table excludes Latinos from the racial categories and assigns them to a separate category. Hispanics/Latinos may be of any race.
| Race / Ethnicity (NH = Non-Hispanic) | Pop 2000 | Pop 2010 | Pop 2020 | % 2000 | % 2010 | % 2020 |
|---|---|---|---|---|---|---|
| White alone (NH) | 35 | 33 | 59 | 1.67% | 1.46% | 2.98% |
| Black or African American alone (NH) | 0 | 2 | 7 | 0.00% | 0.09% | 0.35% |
| Native American or Alaska Native alone (NH) | 1 | 0 | 1 | 0.05% | 0.00% | 0.05% |
| Asian alone (NH) | 0 | 6 | 1 | 0.00% | 0.27% | 0.05% |
| Native Hawaiian or Pacific Islander alone (NH) | 0 | 0 | 0 | 0.00% | 0.00% | 0.00% |
| Other race alone (NH) | 0 | 0 | 12 | 0.00% | 0.00% | 0.61% |
| Mixed race or Multiracial (NH) | 0 | 0 | 2 | 0.00% | 0.00% | 0.10% |
| Hispanic or Latino (any race) | 2,064 | 2,214 | 1,899 | 98.29% | 98.18% | 95.86% |
| Total | 2,100 | 2,255 | 1,981 | 100.00% | 100.00% | 100.00% |

As of the census of 2000, there were 2,100 people, 486 households, and 445 families residing in the CDP. The population density was 503.7 inhabitants per square mile (194.5/km^{2}). There were 567 housing units at an average density of 136.0 per square mile (52.5/km^{2}). The racial makeup of the CDP was 88.71% White, 0.10% African American, 0.14% Native American, 0.05% Asian, 8.90% from other races, and 2.10% from two or more races. Hispanic or Latino of any race were 98.29% of the population.

There were 486 households, out of which 63.6% had children under the age of 18 living with them, 71.2% were married couples living together, 15.8% had a female householder with no husband present, and 8.4% were non-families. 7.0% of all households were made up of individuals, and 4.5% had someone living alone who was 65 years of age or older. The average household size was 4.31 and the average family size was 4.53.

In the CDP, the population was spread out, with 41.7% under the age of 18, 10.9% from 18 to 24, 28.2% from 25 to 44, 13.6% from 45 to 64, and 5.6% who were 65 years of age or older. The median age was 23 years. For every 100 females, there were 98.1 males. For every 100 females age 18 and over, there were 93.2 males.

The median income for a household in the CDP was $21,346, and the median income for a family was $23,821. Males had a median income of $19,100 versus $13,417 for females. The per capita income for the CDP was $6,944. About 36.9% of families and 41.4% of the population were below the poverty line, including 41.7% of those under age 18 and 64.6% of those age 65 or over.

== Education ==
Encantada-Ranchito El Calaboz is served by the San Benito Consolidated Independent School District.

In addition, South Texas Independent School District operates magnet schools that serve the community.
