= Tierra Bonita, Texas =

- Census-designated place

- Location within the state of Texas
- Coordinates: 26°16′2″N 97°49′23″W
- Country: United States
- State: Texas
- County: Cameron

Area
  - Total: 0.91 sq mi (2.35 km^{2})
  - Land: 0.91 sq mi (2.35 km^{2})
  - Water: 0 sq mi (0.0 km^{2})
- Elevation: 46 ft (14 m)

Population (2020)
  - Total: 179
  - Density: 197/sq mi (76.2/km^{2})
- Time zone: UTC-6 (Central (CST))
  - Summer (DST): UTC-5 (CDT)
- FIPS code: 48-72948
- GNIS feature ID: 1852772

Tierra Bonita is a census-designated place (CDP) in Cameron County, Texas, United States. The population was 179 at the 2020 census. It is part of the Brownsville–Harlingen Metropolitan Statistical Area.

== Geography ==
Tierra Bonita is located in northwestern Cameron County at 26°16′2″N 97°49′23″W (26.267226, -97.823184), on the northern border of the town of Santa Rosa. It is 12 miles (19 km) northwest of the center of Harlingen.

According to the United States Census Bureau, the CDP has a total area of 0.91 square miles (2.35 km^{2}), all land.

== Demographics ==
Historical population
| Census | Pop. | Note | %± |
|---|---|---|---|
| 2000 | 160 | | — |
| 2010 | 141 | | −11.9% |
| 2020 | 179 | | 27.0% |
U.S. Decennial Census; 1850–1900 1910; 1920 1930 1940; 1950 1960 1970; 1980 1990 2000; 2010 2020

Tierra Bonita first appeared as a census designated place in the 2000 U.S. census.

=== 2020 census ===
Tierra Bonita CDP, Texas – Racial and ethnic composition Note: the US Census treats Hispanic/Latino as an ethnic category. This table excludes Latinos from the racial categories and assigns them to a separate category. Hispanics/Latinos may be of any race.
| Race / Ethnicity (NH = Non-Hispanic) | Pop 2000 | Pop 2010 | Pop 2020 | % 2000 | % 2010 | % 2020 |
|---|---|---|---|---|---|---|
| White alone (NH) | 7 | 6 | 3 | 4.38% | 4.26% | 1.68% |
| Black or African American alone (NH) | 0 | 0 | 0 | 0.00% | 0.00% | 0.00% |
| Native American or Alaska Native alone (NH) | 1 | 0 | 0 | 0.63% | 0.00% | 0.00% |
| Asian alone (NH) | 0 | 0 | 1 | 0.00% | 0.00% | 0.56% |
| Native Hawaiian or Pacific Islander alone (NH) | 0 | 0 | 0 | 0.00% | 0.00% | 0.00% |
| Other race alone (NH) | 0 | 0 | 0 | 0.00% | 0.00% | 0.00% |
| Mixed race or Multiracial (NH) | 0 | 0 | 2 | 0.00% | 0.00% | 1.12% |
| Hispanic or Latino (any race) | 152 | 135 | 173 | 95.00% | 95.74% | 96.65% |
| Total | 160 | 141 | 179 | 100.00% | 100.00% | 100.00% |

As of the census of 2000, there were 160 people, 40 households, and 34 families residing in the CDP. The population density was 155.2 inhabitants per square mile (59.9/km^{2}). There were 41 housing units at an average density of 39.8 per square mile (15.4/km^{2}). The racial makeup of the CDP was 78.12% White, 0.62% Native American, 18.75% from other races, and 2.50% from two or more races. Hispanic or Latino of any race were 95.00% of the population.

There were 40 households, out of which 52.5% had children under the age of 18 living with them, 70.0% were married couples living together, 15.0% had a female householder with no husband present, and 15.0% were non-families. 15.0% of all households were made up of individuals, and none had someone living alone who was 65 years of age or older. The average household size was 4.00 and the average family size was 4.50.

In the CDP, the population was spread out, with 35.0% under the age of 18, 16.9% from 18 to 24, 25.0% from 25 to 44, 15.6% from 45 to 64, and 7.5% who were 65 years of age or older. The median age was 24 years. For every 100 females, there were 95.1 males. For every 100 females age 18 and over, there were 96.2 males.

The median income for a household in the CDP was $30,179, and the median income for a family was $30,179. Males had a median income of $17,000 versus $29,583 for females. The per capita income for the CDP was $9,377. About 23.1% of families and 27.2% of the population were below the poverty line, including 46.3% of those under the age of eighteen and none of those 65 or over.

== Education ==
Tierra Bonita is served by the Santa Rosa Independent School District.

In addition, South Texas Independent School District operates magnet schools that serve the community.
