= Lasana, Texas =

- Census-designated place
- Coordinates: 26°15′20″N 97°41′40″W
- Country: United States
- State: Texas
- County: Cameron

Area
  - Total: 0.82 sq mi (2.13 km^{2})
  - Land: 0.82 sq mi (2.13 km^{2})
  - Water: 0 sq mi (0.0 km^{2})
- Elevation: 36 ft (11 m)

Population (2020)
  - Total: 104
  - Density: 126/sq mi (48.8/km^{2})
- Time zone: UTC-6 (Central (CST))
  - Summer (DST): UTC-5 (CDT)
- FIPS code: 48-41542
- GNIS feature ID: 1852724

Lasana is a census-designated place (CDP) in Cameron County, Texas, United States. As of the 2020 census, Lasana had a population of 104. It is part of the Brownsville–Harlingen Metropolitan Statistical Area.

== Geography ==
Lasana is located in northwestern Cameron County at 26°15′20″N 97°41′40″W (26.255651, -97.694523). It is 2.5 miles (4.0 km) east of Combes and 4 miles (6 km) north of Harlingen.

According to the United States Census Bureau, the CDP has a total area of 0.82 square miles (2.13 km^{2}), all land.

== Demographics ==
Historical population
Census	Pop.	Note	%±
2000	135		—
2010	84		−37.8%
2020	104		23.8%
U.S. Decennial Census; 1850–1900 1910; 1920 1930 1940; 1950 1960 1970; 1980 1990 2000; 2010 2020

Lasana first appeared as a census designated place in the 2000 U.S. census.

=== 2020 census ===
Lasana CDP, Texas – Racial and ethnic composition Note: the US Census treats Hispanic/Latino as an ethnic category. This table excludes Latinos from the racial categories and assigns them to a separate category. Hispanics/Latinos may be of any race.
Race / Ethnicity (NH = Non-Hispanic)	Pop 2000	Pop 2010	Pop 2020	% 2000	% 2010	% 2020
White alone (NH)	5	15	15	3.70%	17.86%	14.42%
Black or African American alone (NH)	0	0	0	0.00%	0.00%	0.00%
Native American or Alaska Native alone (NH)	2	0	0	1.48%	0.00%	0.00%
Asian alone (NH)	0	0	0	0.00%	0.00%	0.00%
Native Hawaiian or Pacific Islander alone (NH)	0	0	0	0.00%	0.00%	0.00%
Other race alone (NH)	0	0	0	0.00%	0.00%	0.00%
Mixed race or Multiracial (NH)	0	0	0	0.00%	0.00%	0.96%
Hispanic or Latino (any race)	128	69	88	94.81%	82.14%	84.62%
Total	135	84	104	100.00%	100.00%	100.00%

As of the census of 2000, there were 135 people, 42 households, and 30 families residing in the CDP. The population density was 149.7 inhabitants per square mile (57.8/km^{2}). There were 50 housing units at an average density of 55.5 per square mile (21.4/km^{2}). The racial makeup of the CDP was 66.67% White, 1.48% Native American, 30.37% from other races, and 1.48% from two or more races. Hispanic or Latino of any race were 94.81% of the population.

There were 42 households, out of which 33.3% had children under the age of 18 living with them, 69.0% were married couples living together, 4.8% had a female householder with no husband present, and 26.2% were non-families. 16.7% of all households were made up of individuals, and 4.8% had someone living alone who was 65 years of age or older. The average household size was 3.21 and the average family size was 3.84.

In the CDP, the population was spread out, with 26.7% under the age of 18, 12.6% from 18 to 24, 32.6% from 25 to 44, 17.8% from 45 to 64, and 10.4% who were 65 years of age or older. The median age was 30 years. For every 100 females, there were 80.0 males. For every 100 females age 18 and over, there were 86.8 males.

The median income for a household in the CDP was $16,667, and the median income for a family was $43,750. Males had a median income of $35,625 versus $28,125 for females. The per capita income for the CDP was $8,820. There were 44.4% of families and 36.0% of the population living below the poverty line, including 53.8% of under eighteens and 100.0% of those over 64.

== Education ==
Lasana is served by the Harlingen Consolidated Independent School District.

In addition, South Texas Independent School District operates magnet schools that serve the community.
