= Olmito, Texas =

- Census-designated place
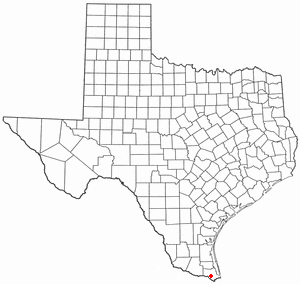
- Location of Olmito, Texas

- Coordinates: 26°1′11″N 97°32′5″W
- Country: United States
- State: Texas
- County: Cameron

Area
  - Total: 0.73 sq mi (1.9 km^{2})
  - Land: 0.66 sq mi (1.7 km^{2})
  - Water: 0.077 sq mi (0.2 km^{2})
- Elevation: 30 ft (9 m)

Population (2020)
  - Total: 1,021
  - Density: 1,600/sq mi (600/km^{2})
- Time zone: UTC-6 (Central (CST))
  - Summer (DST): UTC-5 (CDT)
- ZIP code: 78575
- Area code: 956
- FIPS code: 48-53964
- GNIS feature ID: 1375292

Olmito is a census-designated place (CDP) in Cameron County, Texas, United States. Olmito is Spanish for "little elm". The population was 1,021 at the 2020 census. It is part of the Brownsville–Harlingen metropolitan statistical area. Olmito is the self-described "mesquite capital of the world."

== Geography ==
Olmito is located in south-central Cameron County at 26°1′11″N 97°32′5″W (26.019655, -97.534690). Interstate 69E/U.S. Route 77/U.S. Route 83 runs along the eastern side of the community, leading northwestward 10 miles (16 km) to San Benito and south 9 miles (14 km) to Brownsville.

According to the United States Census Bureau, the CDP has a total area of 0.73 square miles (1.9 km^{2}), of which 0.66 square miles (1.7 km^{2}) is land and 0.1 square miles (0.2 km^{2}), or 11.45%, is water. Olmito Lake is in the northern part of the town, and the Resaca del Rancho Viejo, an ancient channel of the Rio Grande, forms the western edge of the community.

== Demographics ==
Historical population
Census	Pop.	Note	%±
2000	1,198		—
2010	1,210		1.0%
2020	1,021		−15.6%
U.S. Decennial Census; 1850–1900 1910; 1920 1930 1940; 1950 1960 1970; 1980 1990 2000; 2010 2020

Olmito first appeared as a census designated place in the 2000 U.S. census.

=== 2020 census ===
Olmito CDP, Texas – Racial and ethnic composition Note: the US Census treats Hispanic/Latino as an ethnic category. This table excludes Latinos from the racial categories and assigns them to a separate category. Hispanics/Latinos may be of any race.
Race / Ethnicity (NH = Non-Hispanic)	Pop 2000	Pop 2010	Pop 2020	% 2000	% 2010	% 2020
White alone (NH)	42	44	47	3.51%	3.64%	4.60%
Black or African American alone (NH)	0	0	3	0.00%	0.00%	0.29%
Native American or Alaska Native alone (NH)	0	7	0	0.00%	0.58%	0.00%
Asian alone (NH)	0	0	1	0.00%	0.00%	0.10%
Native Hawaiian or Pacific Islander alone (NH)	0	0	0	0.00%	0.00%	0.00%
Other race alone (NH)	0	0	2	0.00%	0.00%	0.20%
Mixed race or Multiracial (NH)	0	0	2	0.00%	0.00%	0.20%
Hispanic or Latino (any race)	1,156	1,159	966	96.49%	95.79%	94.61%
Total	1,198	1,210	1,021	100.00%	100.00%	100.00%

As of the census of 2000, there were 1,198 people, 303 households, and 270 families residing in the CDP. The population density was 1,787.9 inhabitants per square mile (690.3/km^{2}). There were 322 housing units at an average density of 480.6 per square mile (185.6/km^{2}). The racial makeup of the CDP was 98.25% White, 1.34% from other races, and 0.42% from two or more races. Hispanic or Latino of any race were 96.49% of the population.

There were 303 households, out of which 56.8% had children under the age of 18 living with them, 68.3% were married couples living together, 18.2% had a female householder with no husband present, and 10.6% were non-families. 9.9% of all households were made up of individuals, and 5.3% had someone living alone who was 65 years of age or older. The average household size was 3.95 and the average family size was 4.22.

In the CDP, the population was spread out, with 38.1% under the age of 18, 12.9% from 18 to 24, 23.5% from 25 to 44, 17.7% from 45 to 64, and 7.8% who were 65 years of age or older. The median age was 24 years. For every 100 females, there were 96.1 males. For every 100 females age 18 and over, there were 85.7 males.

The median income for a household in the CDP was $13,333, and the median income for a family was $15,000. Males had a median income of $13,125 versus $12,279 for females. The per capita income for the CDP was $5,170. About 47.6% of families and 55.9% of the population were below the poverty line, including 73.4% of those under age 18 and 20.3% of those age 65 or over.

== Education ==
Olmito is served by the Los Fresnos Consolidated Independent School District.

In addition, South Texas Independent School District operates magnet schools that serve the community.

== Government and infrastructure ==
The United States Postal Service operates the Olmito Post Office.

== Climate ==
The climate in this area is characterized by hot, humid summers and generally mild to cool winters. According to the Köppen Climate Classification system, Olmito has a humid subtropical climate, abbreviated "Cfa" on climate maps.
