= Arroyo Alto, Texas =

- Former CDP
- Location within the state of Texas
- Coordinates: 26°8′10″N 97°49′18″W
- Country: United States
- State: Texas
- County: Cameron

Area
  - Total: 0.039 sq mi (0.1 km^{2})
  - Land: 0.039 sq mi (0.1 km^{2})
  - Water: 0 sq mi (0.0 km^{2})
- Elevation: 52 ft (16 m)

Population (2000)
  - Total: 320
  - Density: 5,730/sq mi (2,212.5/km^{2})
- Time zone: UTC-6 (Central (CST))
  - Summer (DST): UTC-5 (CDT)
- FIPS code: 48-04171
- GNIS feature ID: 1852685

Arroyo Alto is a neighborhood of the city of La Feria in Cameron County, in the U.S. state of Texas. Annexed by the city in 2004, Arroyo Alto was a census-designated place (CDP) at the 2000 census, at which time it had a population of 320. It is part of the Brownsville–Harlingen Metropolitan Statistical Area.

== History ==
The town was established in the 1990s.

== Geography ==
Arroyo Alto is located at 26°8′10″N 97°49′18″W (26.136153, -97.821550).

According to the United States Census Bureau, the CDP had a total area of 0.1 square miles (0.3 km^{2}), all land.

== Demographics ==
Historical population
Census	Pop.	Note	%±
U.S. Decennial Census; 1850–1900 1910; 1920 1930 1940; 1950 1960 1970; 1980 1990 2000; 2010

Arroyo Alto first appeared as a census designated place prior to the 2000 U.S. census.

As of the census of 2000, there were 320 people, 72 households, and 67 families residing in the CDP. The population density was 5,730.2 inhabitants per square mile (2,212.4/km^{2}). There were 82 housing units at an average density of 1,468.4 per square mile (567.0/km^{2}). The racial makeup of the CDP was 51.56% White, 45.31% from other races, and 3.12% from two or more races. Hispanic or Latino of any race were 98.12% of the population.

There were 72 households, of which 51.4% had children under the age of 18 living with them, 77.8% were married couples living together, 9.7% had a female householder with no husband present, and 6.9% were non-families. 5.6% of all households were made up of individuals, and 1.4% had someone living alone who was 65 years of age or older. The average household size was 4.44 and the average family size was 4.67.

In the CDP, the population was spread out, with 34.4% under the age of 18, 15.0% from 18 to 24, 20.9% from 25 to 44, 22.8% from 45 to 64, and 6.9% who were 65 years of age or older. The median age was 25 years. For every 100 females, there were 100.0 males. For every 100 females age 18 and over, there were 98.1 males.

The median income for a household in the CDP was $32,115, and the median income for a family was $33,047. Males had a median income of $20,625 versus $0 for females. The per capita income for the CDP was $7,051. About 31.0% of families and 56.1% of the population were below the poverty line, including 80.0% of those under age 18 and 100.0% of those age 65 or over.

== Education ==
Arroyo Alto is served by the La Feria Independent School District.

In addition, South Texas Independent School District operates magnet schools that serve the community.
