= Lyford South, Texas =

- Unincorporated community
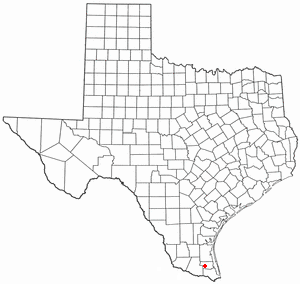
- Location of Lyford South, Texas
- Coordinates: 26°23′57″N 97°47′32″W
- Country: United States
- State: Texas
- County: Willacy

Area
  - Total: 0.19 sq mi (0.5 km^{2})
  - Land: 0.19 sq mi (0.5 km^{2})
  - Water: 0 sq mi (0.0 km^{2})

Population (2000)
  - Total: 172
  - Density: 843/sq mi (325.5/km^{2})
- Time zone: UTC-6 (Central (CST))
  - Summer (DST): UTC-5 (CDT)
- FIPS code: 48-45234

Lyford South is an unincorporated community in Willacy County, Texas, United States. It was formerly classified as a census-designated place (CDP). The population was 172 at the 2000 census.

== Geography ==
Lyford South is located at 26°23′57″N 97°47′32″W (26.399174, -97.792150).

According to the United States Census Bureau, the former CDP has a total area of 0.2 square mile (0.5 km^{2}), all land. Prior to the 2010 census, part of this area was annexed to the city of Lyford.

== Demographics ==
As of the census of 2000, there were 172 people, 49 households, and 44 families residing in the CDP. The population density was 843.1 inhabitants per square mile (325.5/km^{2}). There were 54 housing units at an average density of 264.7 per square mile (102.2/km^{2}). The racial makeup of the CDP was 94.77% White, 5.23% from other races. Hispanic or Latino of any race were 98.84% of the population.

There were 49 households, out of which 42.9% had children under the age of 18 living with them, 61.2% were married couples living together, 24.5% had a female householder with no husband present, and 8.2% were non-families. 6.1% of all households were made up of individuals, and 2.0% had someone living alone who was 65 years of age or older. The average household size was 3.51 and the average family size was 3.60.

In the CDP, the population was spread out, with 30.8% under the age of 18, 7.0% from 18 to 24, 31.4% from 25 to 44, 19.2% from 45 to 64, and 11.6% who were 65 years of age or older. The median age was 33 years. For every 100 females, there were 81.1 males. For every 100 females age 18 and over, there were 80.3 males.

The median income for a household in the CDP was $15,156, and the median income for a family was $15,156. Males had a median income of $15,125 versus $20,278 for females. The per capita income for the CDP was $6,466. About 39.7% of families and 47.9% of the population were below the poverty line, including 67.0% of those under the age of eighteen and 16.7% of those 65 or over.

== Education ==
Lyford South is served by the Lyford Consolidated Independent School District.

In addition, South Texas Independent School District operates magnet schools that serve the community.
