= Bausell and Ellis, Texas =

- Former CDP
- Location within the state of Texas
- Coordinates: 26°26′5″N 97°47′13″W
- Country: United States
- State: Texas
- County: Willacy

Area
  - Total: 0.12 sq mi (0.3 km^{2})
  - Land: 0.12 sq mi (0.3 km^{2})
  - Water: 0 sq mi (0.0 km^{2})

Population (2000)
  - Total: 112
  - Density: 984/sq mi (380.1/km^{2})
- Time zone: UTC-6 (Central (CST))
  - Summer (DST): UTC-5 (CDT)
- FIPS code: 48-05954

Bausell and Ellis is a former census-designated place (CDP) in Willacy County, Texas, United States. The population was 112 at the 2000 census.

== Geography ==
Bausell and Ellis is located at 26°26′5″N 97°47′13″W (26.434784, -97.786903).

According to the United States Census Bureau, the CDP has a total area of 0.1 square miles (0.3 km^{2}), all of it land.

== Demographics ==
As of the census of 2000, there were 112 people, 32 households, and 28 families residing in the CDP. The population density was 984.4 inhabitants per square mile (380.1/km^{2}). There were 36 housing units at an average density of 316.4 per square mile (122.2/km^{2}). The racial makeup of the CDP was 80.36% White, 5.36% Native American, 13.39% from other races, and 0.89% from two or more races. Hispanic or Latino of any race were 84.82% of the population.

There were 32 households, out of which 37.5% had children under the age of 18 living with them, 56.3% were married couples living together, 21.9% had a female householder with no husband present, and 12.5% were non-families. 12.5% of all households were made up of individuals, and 9.4% had someone living alone who was 65 years of age or older. The average household size was 3.50 and the average family size was 3.86.

In the CDP, the population was spread out, with 27.7% under the age of 18, 17.0% from 18 to 24, 32.1% from 25 to 44, 11.6% from 45 to 64, and 11.6% who were 65 years of age or older. The median age was 30 years. For every 100 females, there were 86.7 males. For every 100 females age 18 and over, there were 92.9 males.

The median income for a household in the CDP was $23,542, and the median income for a family was $24,271. Males had a median income of $22,917 versus $11,250 for females. The per capita income for the CDP was $7,140. There were 20.7% of families and 26.6% of the population living below the poverty line, including 43.1% of under eighteens and none of those over 64.

== Education ==
Bausell and Ellis is within the Lyford Consolidated Independent School District.

In addition, South Texas Independent School District operates magnet schools that serve Bausell and Ellis and many surrounding communities.
