= Bixby, Texas =

- CDP
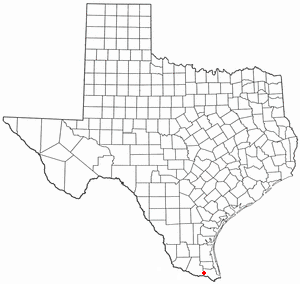
- Location of Bixby, Texas

- Coordinates: 26°8′36″N 97°51′26″W
- Country: United States
- State: Texas
- County: Cameron

Area
  - Total: 1.7 sq mi (4.3 km^{2})
  - Land: 1.7 sq mi (4.3 km^{2})
  - Water: 0 sq mi (0.0 km^{2})
- Elevation: 59 ft (18 m)

Population (2020)
  - Total: 352
  - Density: 210/sq mi (82/km^{2})
- Time zone: UTC-6 (Central (CST))
  - Summer (DST): UTC-5 (CDT)
- FIPS code: 48-08410
- GNIS feature ID: 1330729

Bixby is a census-designated place (CDP) in Cameron County, Texas, United States. The population was 352 at the 2020 census. It is part of the Brownsville–Harlingen Metropolitan Statistical Area.

== Geography ==
Bixby is located at 26°8′36″N 97°51′26″W (26.143269, -97.857239).

According to the United States Census Bureau, the CDP has a total area of 1.6 square miles (4.1 km^{2}), all land.

== Demographics ==
Historical population
| Census | Pop. | Note | %± |
|---|---|---|---|
| 2000 | 356 | | — |
| 2010 | 504 | | 41.6% |
| 2020 | 352 | | −30.2% |
U.S. Decennial Census; 1850–1900 1910; 1920 1930 1940; 1950 1960 1970; 1980 1990 2000; 2010 2020

Bixby first appeared as a census designated place prior to the 2000 U.S. census.

=== 2020 census ===
Bixby CDP, Texas – Racial and ethnic composition Note: the US Census treats Hispanic/Latino as an ethnic category. This table excludes Latinos from the racial categories and assigns them to a separate category. Hispanics/Latinos may be of any race.
| Race / Ethnicity (NH = Non-Hispanic) | Pop 2000 | Pop 2010 | Pop 2020 | % 2000 | % 2010 | % 2020 |
|---|---|---|---|---|---|---|
| White alone (NH) | 78 | 101 | 28 | 21.91% | 20.04% | 7.95% |
| Black or African American alone (NH) | 0 | 0 | 0 | 0.00% | 0.00% | 0.00% |
| Native American or Alaska Native alone (NH) | 0 | 1 | 0 | 0.00% | 0.20% | 0.00% |
| Asian alone (NH) | 1 | 0 | 3 | 0.28% | 0.00% | 0.85% |
| Native Hawaiian or Pacific Islander alone (NH) | 0 | 0 | 0 | 0.00% | 0.00% | 0.00% |
| Other race alone (NH) | 0 | 0 | 2 | 0.00% | 0.00% | 0.57% |
| Mixed race or Multiracial (NH) | 3 | 2 | 3 | 0.84% | 0.40% | 0.85% |
| Hispanic or Latino (any race) | 274 | 400 | 316 | 76.97% | 79.37% | 89.77% |
| Total | 356 | 504 | 352 | 100.00% | 100.00% | 100.00% |

At the 2000 census there were 356 people in 102 households, including 88 families, in the CDP. The population density was 216.4 inhabitants per square mile (83.6/km^{2}). There were 126 housing units at an average density of 76.6 per square mile (29.6/km^{2}). The racial makeup of the CDP was 81.46% White, 1.40% Native American, 0.28% Asian, 13.48% from other races, and 3.37% from two or more races. Hispanic or Latino of any race were 76.97%.

Of the 102 households 51.0% had children under the age of 18 living with them, 65.7% were married couples living together, 17.6% had a female householder with no husband present, and 13.7% were non-families. 11.8% of households were one person and 4.9% were one person aged 65 or older. The average household size was 3.49 and the average family size was 3.81.

The age distribution was 37.1% under the age of 18, 8.7% from 18 to 24, 26.4% from 25 to 44, 18.5% from 45 to 64, and 9.3% 65 or older. The median age was 29 years. For every 100 females, there were 95.6 males. For every 100 females age 18 and over, there were 94.8 males.

The median income for a household in the CDP was $12,639, and the median family income was $13,819. Males had a median income of $20,625 versus $11,250 for females. The per capita income for the CDP was $4,852. About 53.1% of families and 43.5% of the population were below the poverty line, including 52.7% of those under age 18 and none of those age 65 or over.

== Education ==
Bixby is served by the La Feria Independent School District.

In addition, South Texas Independent School District operates magnet schools that serve the community.
