= Arroyo Colorado Estates, Texas =

- Census-designated place
- Coordinates: 26°11′4″N 97°36′38″W
- Country: United States
- State: Texas
- County: Cameron

Area
  - Total: 1.1 sq mi (2.8 km^{2})
  - Land: 1.1 sq mi (2.8 km^{2})
  - Water: 0 sq mi (0.0 km^{2})

Population (2020)
  - Total: 833
  - Density: 770/sq mi (300/km^{2})
- Time zone: UTC-6 (Central (CST))
  - Summer (DST): UTC-5 (CDT)
- FIPS code: 48-04174

Arroyo Colorado Estates is a census-designated place (CDP) in Cameron County, in the U.S. state of Texas. As of the 2020 census, Arroyo Colorado Estates had a population of 833. It is part of the Brownsville–Harlingen Metropolitan Statistical Area.

== History ==
The town was established in the 1980s.

== Geography ==
Arroyo Colorado Estates is located at 26°11′04″N 97°36′38″W.

According to the United States Census Bureau, the CDP has a total area of 1.1 square miles (2.8 km^{2}), all land.

== Demographics ==
Historical population
Census	Pop.	Note	%±
2000	755		—
2010	997		32.1%
2020	833		−16.4%
U.S. Decennial Census; 1850–1900 1910; 1920 1930 1940; 1950 1960 1970; 1980 1990 2000; 2010 2020

Arroyo Colorado Estates first appeared as a census-designated place prior to the 2000 U.S. census.

=== 2020 census ===
Arroyo Colorado Estates CDP, Texas – Racial and ethnic composition Note: the US Census treats Hispanic/Latino as an ethnic category. This table excludes Latinos from the racial categories and assigns them to a separate category. Hispanics/Latinos may be of any race.
Race / Ethnicity (NH = Non-Hispanic)	Pop 2000	Pop 2010	Pop 2020	% 2000	% 2010	% 2020
White alone (NH)	26	27	18	3.44%	2.71%	2.16%
Black or African American alone (NH)	0	0	0	0.00%	0.00%	0.00%
Native American or Alaska Native alone (NH)	0	2	1	0.00%	0.20%	0.12%
Asian alone (NH)	0	0	0	0.00%	0.00%	0.00%
Native Hawaiian or Pacific Islander alone (NH)	0	0	0	0.00%	0.00%	0.00%
Other race alone (NH)	0	3	1	0.00%	0.30%	0.12%
Mixed race or Multiracial (NH)	0	1	1	0.00%	0.10%	0.12%
Hispanic or Latino (any race)	729	964	812	96.56%	96.69%	97.48%
Total	755	997	833	100.00%	100.00%	100.00%

As of the census of 2000, there were 755 people, 177 households, and 167 families residing in the CDP. The population density was 688.9 inhabitants per square mile (266.0/km^{2}). There were 200 housing units at an average density of 182.5 per square mile (70.5/km^{2}). The racial makeup of the CDP was 98.15% White, 0.40% African American, and 1.46% from two or more races. Hispanic or Latino of any race were 96.56% of the population.

There were 177 households, out of which 60.5% had children under the age of 18 living with them, 77.4% were married couples living together, 14.7% had a female householder with no husband present, and 5.6% were non-families. 4.5% of all households were made up of individuals, and 2.3% had someone living alone who was 65 years of age or older. The average household size was 4.27 and the average family size was 4.34.

In the CDP, the population was spread out, with 39.6% under the age of 18, 15.1% from 18 to 24, 25.4% from 25 to 44, 14.8% from 45 to 64, and 5.0% who were 65 years of age or older. The median age was 22 years. For every 100 females, there were 110.3 males. For every 100 females age 18 and over, there were 100.0 males.

The median income for a household in the CDP was $22,069, and the median income for a family was $22,284. Males had a median income of $19,423 versus $20,000 for females. The per capita income for the CDP was $5,971. About 28.5% of families and 27.6% of the population were below the poverty line, including 41.0% of those under age 18 and none of those age 65 or over.

== Education ==
The community is served by the Rio Hondo Independent School District.

In addition, South Texas Independent School District operates magnet schools that serve the community.
