= Grand Acres, Texas =

- Census-designated place
- Coordinates: 26°14′26″N 97°49′43″W
- Country: United States
- State: Texas
- County: Cameron

Area
  - Total: 0.46 sq mi (1.2 km^{2})
  - Land: 0.46 sq mi (1.2 km^{2})
  - Water: 0 sq mi (0.0 km^{2})
- Elevation: 49 ft (15 m)

Population (2010)
  - Total: 49
  - Density: 107/sq mi (41.2/km^{2})
- Time zone: UTC-6 (Central (CST))
  - Summer (DST): UTC-5 (CDT)
- FIPS code: 48-30422
- GNIS feature ID: 1852707

Grand Acres is a census-designated place (CDP) in Cameron County, Texas, United States. The population was 49 at the 2010 census. It is part of the Brownsville–Harlingen Metropolitan Statistical Area.

== Geography ==
Grand Acres is located in northwestern Cameron County at 26°14′26″N 97°49′43″W (26.240505, -97.828732).

Grand Acres is bordered to the northeast by the town of Santa Rosa and is 10 miles (16 km) northwest of the center of Harlingen.

According to the United States Census Bureau, the Grand Acres CDP has a total area of 1.2 km^{2} (0.46 mi^{2}; 120 ha; 300 acres), all of it land.

== Demographics ==
Historical population
Census	Pop.	Note	%±
2000	203		—
2010	49		−75.9%
U.S. Decennial Census; 1850–1900 1910; 1920 1930 1940; 1950 1960 1970; 1980 1990 2000; 2010 2020

Grand Acres first appeared as a census designated place in the 2000 U.S. census. Part of its territory was absorbed by the town of Santa Rosa prior to the 2010 U.S. census. The CDP was deleted prior to the 2020 U.S. census.

=== 2010 census ===
Grand Acres CDP, Texas – Racial and ethnic composition Note: the US Census treats Hispanic/Latino as an ethnic category. This table excludes Latinos from the racial categories and assigns them to a separate category. Hispanics/Latinos may be of any race.
Race / Ethnicity (NH = Non-Hispanic)	Pop 2000	Pop 2010	% 2000	% 2010
White alone (NH)	14	0	6.90%	0.00%
Black or African American alone (NH)	0	0	0.00%	0.00%
Native American or Alaska Native alone (NH)	0	0	0.00%	0.00%
Asian alone (NH)	0	0	0.00%	0.00%
Pacific Islander alone (NH)	0	0	0.00%	0.00%
Some Other Race alone (NH)	0	0	0.00%	0.00%
Mixed Race or Multi-Racial (NH)	0	0	0.00%	0.00%
Hispanic or Latino (any race)	189	49	93.10%	100.00%
Total	203	49	100.00%	100.00%

As of the census of 2000, there were 203 people, 49 households, and 46 families residing in the CDP. The population density was 421.8 inhabitants per square mile (162.9/km^{2}). There were 54 housing units at an average density of 112.2 per square mile (43.3/km^{2}). The racial makeup of the CDP was 54.19% White, 43.35% from other races, and 2.46% from two or more races. Hispanic or Latino of any race were 93.10% of the population.

There were 49 households, out of which 51.0% had children under the age of 18 living with them, 71.4% were married couples living together, 20.4% had a female householder with no husband present, and 6.1% were non-families. 4.1% of all households were made up of individuals, and 2.0% had someone living alone who was 65 years of age or older. The average household size was 4.14 and the average family size was 4.28.

In the CDP, the population was spread out, with 36.5% under the age of 18, 11.3% from 18 to 24, 26.1% from 25 to 44, 17.2% from 45 to 64, and 8.9% who were 65 years of age or older. The median age was 26 years. For every 100 females, there were 118.3 males. For every 100 females age 18 and over, there were 92.5 males.

The median income for a household in the CDP was $25,625, and the median income for a family was $25,547. Males had a median income of $21,500 versus $13,438 for females. The per capita income for the CDP was $5,807. About 27.9% of families and 34.9% of the population were below the poverty line, including 46.9% of those under the age of eighteen and 34.8% of those 65 or over.

== Education ==
Grand Acres is served by the Santa Rosa Independent School District.

In addition, South Texas Independent School District operates magnet schools that serve the community.
