= La Paloma, Texas =

- Census-designated place
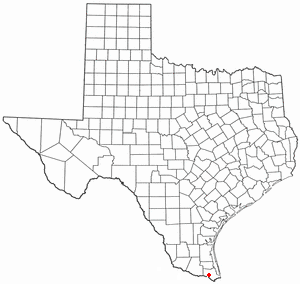
- Location of La Paloma, Texas

- Coordinates: 26°2′55″N 97°40′1″W
- Country: United States
- State: Texas
- County: Cameron

Area
  - Total: 2.2 sq mi (5.6 km^{2})
  - Land: 2.2 sq mi (5.6 km^{2})
  - Water: 0 sq mi (0.0 km^{2})
- Elevation: 49 ft (15 m)

Population (2020)
  - Total: 3,218
  - Density: 1,500/sq mi (570/km^{2})
- Time zone: UTC-6 (Central (CST))
  - Summer (DST): UTC-5 (CDT)
- ZIP code: 78586
- Area code: 956
- FIPS code: 48-41416
- GNIS feature ID: 1374420

La Paloma (Spanish: The Dove) is a census-designated place (CDP) in Cameron County, Texas, United States. The population was 2,903 at the 2010 census, up from 354 at the 2000 census, when it was drawn to cover a much smaller area. By the 2020 census, the population further increased to 3,218. It is part of the Brownsville–Harlingen Metropolitan Statistical Area.

== Geography ==
La Paloma is located in southwestern Cameron County at 26°2′55″N 97°40′1″W (26.048605, -97.667017). It is on the north side of U.S. Route 281, 16 miles (26 km) northwest of the center of Brownsville and 5 miles (8 km) east of Los Indios. It is less than one mile north of the Rio Grande, the Mexico–United States border.

According to the United States Census Bureau, the La Paloma CDP has a total area of 2.2 square miles (5.6 km^{2}), all land.

== Demographics ==
Historical population
Census	Pop.	Note	%±
2000	354		—
2010	2,903		720.1%
2020	3,218		10.9%
U.S. Decennial Census; 1850–1900 1910; 1920 1930 1940; 1950 1960 1970; 1980 1990 2000; 2010 2020

La Paloma first appeared as a census designated place in the 2000 U.S. census.

=== 2020 census ===
La Paloma CDP, Texas – Racial and ethnic composition Note: the US Census treats Hispanic/Latino as an ethnic category. This table excludes Latinos from the racial categories and assigns them to a separate category. Hispanics/Latinos may be of any race.
Race / Ethnicity (NH = Non-Hispanic)	Pop 2000	Pop 2010	Pop 2020	% 2000	% 2010	% 2020
White alone (NH)	18	41	37	5.08%	1.41%	1.15%
Black or African American alone (NH)	0	0	0	0.00%	0.00%	0.00%
Native American or Alaska Native alone (NH)	0	0	1	0.00%	0.00%	0.03%
Asian alone (NH)	0	8	8	0.00%	0.28%	0.25%
Native Hawaiian or Pacific Islander alone (NH)	0	0	0	0.00%	0.00%	0.00%
Other race alone (NH)	1	2	4	0.28%	0.07%	0.12%
Mixed race or Multiracial (NH)	9	0	3	2.54%	0.00%	0.09%
Hispanic or Latino (any race)	326	2,852	3,165	92.09%	98.24%	98.35%
Total	354	2,903	3,218	100.00%	100.00%	100.00%

As of the census of 2010, there were 2,903 people, 93 households, and 83 families residing in the CDP. The population density was 1,371.4 inhabitants per square mile (529.5/km^{2}). There were 108 housing units at an average density of 418.4 per square mile (161.5/km^{2}). The racial makeup of the CDP was 38.14% White, 55.65% from other races, and 6.21% from two or more races. Hispanic or Latino of any race were 92.09% of the population.

There were 93 households, out of which 48.4% had children under the age of 18 living with them, 71.0% were married couples living together, 10.8% had a female householder with no husband present, and 9.7% were non-families. 7.5% of all households were made up of individuals, and 4.3% had someone living alone who was 65 years of age or older. The average household size was 3.81 and the average family size was 4.01.

In the CDP, the population was spread out, with 35.0% under the age of 18, 12.7% from 18 to 24, 26.6% from 25 to 44, 16.7% from 45 to 64, and 9.0% who were 65 years of age or older. The median age was 26 years. For every 100 females, there were 102.3 males. For every 100 females age 18 and over, there were 93.3 males.

The median income for a household in the CDP was $12,162, and the median income for a family was $12,162. Males had a median income of $11,912 versus $0 for females. The per capita income for the CDP was $5,354. About 54.8% of families and 65.2% of the population were below the poverty line, including 91.2% of those under age 18 and none of those age 65 or over.

== Education ==
La Paloma is served by the San Benito Consolidated Independent School District.

In addition, South Texas Independent School District operates magnet schools that serve the community.

== In popular culture ==
La Paloma is mentioned in the Hank Snow adaptation of the Geoff Mack song "I've Been Everywhere", which was later covered by more than 130 artists, including Johnny Cash.
