= San Benito High School (Texas) =

Location
- 450 South Williams Road; San Benito, Texas 78586; United States; 26°08′31″N 97°39′11″W

Information
- Type: Public
- School district: San Benito Consolidated Independent School District
- NCES School ID: 483879004426
- Principal: Henry Sanchez
- Teaching staff: 139.30 (on FTE basis)
- Grades: 10–12
- Enrollment: 1,944 (2023–2024)
- Student to teacher ratio: 13.96
- Colors: Purple, gold and grey
- Athletics conference: UIL Class AAAAAA
- Mascot: Thunder (Greyhounds)
- Yearbook: El Sendero
- Website: sbhs.sbcisd.net

San Benito High School is a public high school located in the city of San Benito, Texas, United States. It is classified as a 6A school by the UIL. It is a part of the San Benito Consolidated Independent School District located in southwestern Cameron County. For the 2024–2025 school year, the school was given a "D" by the Texas Education Agency.

== Athletic ==
The San Benito Greyhounds compete in these sports:

- Baseball
- Basketball
- Cross country
- Football
- Golf
- Powerlifting
- Soccer
- Softball
- Tennis
- Track and field
- Volleyball
- Wrestling

== Theater ==
- One Act Play
  - 1961 (3A)

== Notable alumni ==
- Bobby Morrow, American sprinter, won three gold medals at the 1956 Olympics
- Mayra Flores, ex-Congresswoman
