= Los Fresnos, Texas =

- City
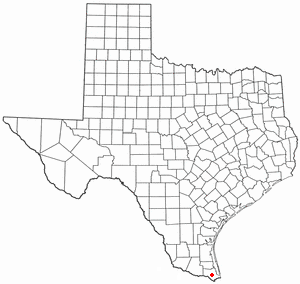
- Location of Los Fresnos, Texas

- Coordinates: 26°4′24″N 97°28′41″W
- Country: United States
- State: Texas
- County: Cameron

Area
  - Total: 4.29 sq mi (11.11 km^{2})
  - Land: 4.10 sq mi (10.62 km^{2})
  - Water: 0.19 sq mi (0.48 km^{2})
- Elevation: 23 ft (7 m)

Population (2020)
  - Total: 8,114
  - Estimate (2024): 8,700
  - Density: 1,979/sq mi (764.0/km^{2})
- Time zone: UTC-6 (Central (CST))
  - Summer (DST): UTC-5 (CDT)
- ZIP code: 78566
- Area code: 956
- FIPS code: 48-44116
- GNIS feature ID: 1374724
- Website: cityoflosfresnos.com

Los Fresnos is a city in Cameron County, Texas, United States. The population was 8,114 at the 2020 census, up from 5,542 at the 2010 census. It is part of the Brownsville–Harlingen–Raymondville and the Matamoros–Brownsville metropolitan areas.

Located in south-central Cameron County, the city was named for the fresnos (Fraxinus berlandieriana) scattered in the woods and along streams. In 1912, Lon Hill, an early landowner, formed a company to develop a canal system that would use the Rio Grande to irrigate land for farming. Railroad construction in the early 1900s began to bring settlers to the area, and by 1915, a post office was established. Because of the fertile, irrigated land, farm products increased, and with the long growing season in the Rio Grande Valley, farming flourished. Today, the city is still surrounded by fertile farm/ranch land. Major crops are cotton, sugarcane, grains, oranges, and red grapefruit.

== Geography ==
Los Fresnos is located slightly south of the geographic center of Cameron County at 26°4′24″N 97°28′41″W (26.073216, –97.478164). It is 12 mi (19 km) north of the center of Brownsville and 18 mi (29 km) southeast of Harlingen.

According to the United States Census Bureau, Los Fresnos has a total area of 3.1 sq mi (7.9 km^{2}), of which 0.1 sq mi (0.3 km^{2}), or 3.98%, is covered by water.

Situated slightly north of the city of Brownsville, Los Fresnos experiences average temperatures, which land the community within the humid subtropical climate zone, but like the rest of the lower Rio Grande Valley, fluctuating temperatures cause the area to transition between a humid subtropical climate and a tropical savanna climate. Due to this, tropical vegetation grows widely around the surrounding area. Temperature extremes range from highs near 100 °F in the summer down to around freezing temperatures about once or twice a year, and not at all during some years. In addition, Los Fresnos is prone to impact from hurricanes. Notable hurricanes to hit the area include Beulah, Allen, and Dolly. Thunderstorm activity occurs usually during the spring and fall when cold fronts cause instability with the region's warm climate. While not a common occurrence, the city occasionally experiences hail or brief tornadoes.

== Demographics ==
Historical population
Census	Pop.	Note	%±
1950	1,113		—
1960	1,289		15.8%
1970	1,297		0.6%
1980	2,173		67.5%
1990	2,473		13.8%
2000	4,512		82.5%
2010	5,542		22.8%
2020	8,114		46.4%
2021 (est.)	8,152	▲	0.5%
U.S. Decennial Census; 1850–1900 1910; 1920 1930; 1940; 1950 1960 1970; 1980 1990 2000; 2010

=== 2020 census ===
As of the 2020 census, there were 8,114 people, 2,376 households, and 1,798 families residing in the city. The median age was 30.4 years. 32.1% of residents were under the age of 18 and 10.1% of residents were 65 years of age or older. For every 100 females there were 88.3 males, and for every 100 females age 18 and over there were 81.9 males age 18 and over.

98.6% of residents lived in urban areas, while 1.4% lived in rural areas.

Of the 2,376 households in Los Fresnos, 52.1% had children under the age of 18 living in them. Of all households, 52.1% were married-couple households, 10.9% were households with a male householder and no spouse or partner present, and 31.1% were households with a female householder and no spouse or partner present. About 13.3% of all households were made up of individuals and 7.1% had someone living alone who was 65 years of age or older. There were 2,695 housing units, of which 11.8% were vacant. The homeowner vacancy rate was 2.8% and the rental vacancy rate was 12.2%.

Racial composition as of the 2020 census
Race	Number	Percent
White	3,499	43.1%
Black or African American	33	0.4%
American Indian and Alaska Native	80	1.0%
Asian	24	0.3%
Native Hawaiian and Other Pacific Islander	7	0.1%
Some other race	1,373	16.9%
Two or more races	3,098	38.2%
Hispanic or Latino (of any race)	7,309	90.1%

=== 2000 census ===
As of the census of 2000, 4,512 people, 1,296 households, and 1,092 families resided in the city. The population density was 1,868.9 inhabitants per square mile (721.6/km^{2}). The 1,480 housing units averaged 613.0 per square mile (237.1/km^{2}). The racial makeup of the city was 81.96% White, 0.42% African American, 0.13% Native American, 0.02% Asian, 0.09% Pacific Islander, 14.38% from other races, and 2.99% from two or more races. Hispanics or Latinos of any race were 84.62% of the population.

Of the 1,296 households, 53.5% had children under the age of 18 living with them, 63.7% were married couples living together, 17.7% had a female householder with no husband present, and 15.7% were not families. About 14.2% of all households were made up of individuals, and 7.7% had someone living alone who was 65 years of age or older. The average household size was 3.48, and the average family size was 3.86.

In the city, the population was distributed as 36.4% under the age of 18, 9.2% from 18 to 24, 29.2% from 25 to 44, 17.1% from 45 to 64, and 8.1% who were 65 years of age or older. The median age was 28 years. For every 100 females, there were 93.8 males. For every 100 females age 18 and over, there were 84.6 males.

The median income for a household in the city was $25,793, and for a family was $27,670. Males had a median income of $20,459 versus $17,904 for females. The per capita income for the city was $9,507. About 28.5% of families and 34.2% of the population were below the poverty line, including 43.8% of those under age 18 and 22.4% of those age 65 or over.

== Government and infrastructure ==
The United States Postal Service operates the Los Fresnos Post Office.

U.S. Immigration and Customs Enforcement operates the Port Isabel Service Processing Center, which is located in an unincorporated area adjacent to Port Isabel-Cameron County Airport, 13 miles (21 km) northeast of Los Fresnos.

Local public transportation is provided by Valley Metro.

== Sites of interest ==
The Los Fresnos Rodeo and the Cameron County Livestock Show is held annually on the third weekend in February.

Los Fresnos Motocross Park has campsites available at the track to accommodate recreational vehicles and tents. Quads are also welcomed to race, with categories for every age and bike sizes, such as Mini 50-cc, 250-cc, quads, etc.

Little Graceland was located on West Highway 100 and contains a small collection of Elvis Presley memorabilia, including photos, posters, watches, and playing cards. It was operated by the late Simon Vega, who served with Presley in the Army in Germany from 1958 to 1960.

== Education ==
Los Fresnos is served by the Los Fresnos Consolidated Independent School District.

The Ethel L. Whipple Memorial Library serves Los Fresnos.

== Media ==
=== Newspapers ===
- Los Fresnos News

=== Radio stations ===
- KFRQ 94.5FM – Official Site
- KKPS 99.5FM – Official Site
- KNVO 101.1FM – Official Site
- KBFM 104.1FM – Official Site
- KLME 105.5FM
- KVLY 107.9FM – Official Site
