= San Benito Consolidated Independent School District =

School district in Texas, United States

Address
- 240 North Crockett Street San Benito, Texas, 78586; United States

District information
- Grades: PK–12
- Schools: 24
- NCES District ID: 4838790

Students and staff
- Students: 9,126 (2023–2024)
- Teachers: 629.71 (on an FTE basis)
- Student–teacher ratio: 14.49:1

Other information
- Website: www.sbcisd.net

San Benito Consolidated Independent School District is a public school district based in San Benito, Texas, United States. It was formed on April 26, 1952, via the merger of the San Benito Independent School District and the Rangerville Independent School District.

In addition to San Benito, the district serves the incorporated towns of Los Indios and Rangerville, as well as the unincorporated communities of El Camino Angosto, Encantada-Ranchito El Calaboz, La Paloma, and Lago. A small portion of Harlingen also lies within the district.

In 2009, the school district was rated "academically acceptable" by the Texas Education Agency.

== Schools ==
High schools

- San Benito High School
- San Benito Veterans Memorial Academy

Middle schools

- Berta Cabaza Middle School
- Miller Jordan Middle School
- San Benito Riverside Middle School

Elementary Schools

- Fred Booth Elementary School
- Dr. C.M. Cash Elementary School
- Judge Oscar De La Fuente Elementary School
- Ed Downs Elementary School
- Dr. Raul Garza Jr. Elementary School
- Landrum Elementary School (closed 2018)
- La Encantada Elementary School
- La Paloma Elementary School
- Angela G. Leal Elementary School
- Frank Roberts Elementary School
- Rangerville Elementary School
- Sullivan Elementary School
