= Los Fresnos High School =

Location
- 907 N Arroyo; Los Fresnos, Texas 78566; United States; 26.082816°N 97.473111°W

Information
- Type: Public high school
- School district: Los Fresnos Consolidated Independent School District
- Superintendent: Gonzalo Salazar
- Principal: Justin Stumbaugh
- Teaching staff: 202.97 (on an FTE basis)
- Grades: 9–12
- Enrollment: 3,291 (2023-2024)
- Student to teacher ratio: 16.21
- Colors: Maroon and gold
- Athletics conference: UIL
- Team name: Los Fresnos Falcons
- Website: lfhs.lfcisd.net

Los Fresnos High School (LFHS) is a public high school located in Los Fresnos, Texas (USA). It is the sole high school in the Los Fresnos Consolidated Independent School District and is classified as a 6A school by the UIL. For the 2024-2025 school year, the school was given a "B" by the Texas Education Agency.

== Athletics ==
The Los Fresnos Falcons compete in the following sports:

- Baseball
- Basketball
- Cross country
- Football
- Golf
- Marching band
- NJROTC
- Powerlifting
- Soccer
- Softball
- Swimming and diving
- Tennis
- Track and field
- Volleyball
- Wrestling

== Notable alumni ==
- Jeremy Springer, former college football player and current special teams coordinator for the New England Patriots
