= Los Fresnos Consolidated Independent School District =

School district in Texas, United States

Address
- 600 Mesquite Lane Los Fresnos, Texas; United States

District information
- Superintendent: Gonzalo Salazar
- NCES District ID: 4828290

Students and staff
- Students: 10,546 (2023–2024)
- Teachers: 666.47 (on an FTE basis)
- Student–teacher ratio: 15.82:1

Other information
- Website: www.lfcisd.net

Los Fresnos Consolidated Independent School District is a public school district based in Los Fresnos, Texas (USA).

In addition to Los Fresnos, the district serves the towns of Bayview and Indian Lake as well as the communities of Arroyo Gardens, Chula Vista, Del Mar Heights, Green Valley Farms, La Tina Ranch, Laureles, Olmito, and Orason. Portions of Brownsville and Rancho Viejo also lie within the district.

In 2016, the school district was rated "Met Standard" by the Texas Education Agency.

== Schools ==
=== High School (Grades 9-12) ===
- Los Fresnos High School (6A) (grades 11-12)
- Los Fresnos United (grades 9-10)

=== Middle Schools (Grades 6-8) ===
- Resaca Middle School
- Los Cuates Middle School
- Liberty Memorial Middle School

=== Elementary Schools (Grades PK-5) ===
- Las Yescas Elementary
- Laureles Elementary
- Lopez-Riggins Elementary
- Los Fresnos Elementary
- Olmito Elementary
- Palmer-Laakso Elementary
- Villareal Elementary
- Rancho Verde Elementary
- Dora Romero Elementary
