= Special routes of U.S. Route 77 =

Special routes of U.S. Route 77

Highway system
- United States Numbered Highway System; List; Special; Divided

Several special routes of U.S. Route 77 exist. In order from south to north they are as follows.

== Texas ==
=== Brownsville business loop ===
Business U.S. Highway 77
- Location: Brownsville, Texas
- Length: 3.955 mi (6.365 km)
- Existed: June 21, 1990–present

Business U.S. Highway 77-Z (Bus. US 77-Z) is a 3.8-mile (6.1 km) business loop in Brownsville. The loop's southern terminus begins at an intersection of SH 4 and takes a northwestern direction before turning to the north. The business loop's northern terminus is at an intersection of FM 802, close to an intersection of I-69E, US 77, and US 83.

=== San Benito–Harlingen–Combes business loop ===
Business U.S. Highway 77
- Location: San Benito–Combes, Texas
- Length: 14.956 mi (24.069 km)
- Existed: June 21, 1990–present

Business U.S. Highway 77-X (Bus. US 77-X) is a 15.9-mile (25.6 km) business loop that runs through San Benito, Harlingen, and Combes. The business loop begins at an interchange with I-69E and US 77, heading northwest through San Benito before entering Harlingen. After briefly turning to the north while passing through Harlingen, Bus. US 77-X turns back to the northwest where it intersects with I-69E and US 77 again. The business loop then exits Harlingen and continues northwest into Combes. After leaving Combes, the business loop reaches its northern terminus at another intersection with I-69E and US 77.

=== Sebastian–Lyford–Raymondville business loop ===
Business U.S. Highway 77
- Location: Sebastian–Raymondville, Texas
- Length: 14.397 mi (23.170 km)
- Existed: June 21, 1990–present

Business U.S. Highway 77-W (Bus. US 77-W) is a 14.2-mile (22.9 km) business loop that runs through Sebastian, Lyford, and Raymondville. The business loop begins at its southern terminus at an intersection with I-69E and US 77, turning to the northwest before turning north, running parallel with I-69E and US 77. Bus. US 77-W reaches Sebastian, passing through town before exiting, eventually reaching South Lyford and Lyford. Bus. US 77-W continues northward out of town before turning slightly to the northeast and entering Raymondville. The business loop continues northeastward before reaching an intersection with Willacy County Road 3690W. Bus. 77-W then turns to the right and immediately ends at its northern terminus at another intersection with I-69E and US 77.

=== Riviera business loop ===
Business U.S. Highway 77
- Location: Riviera, Texas
- Length: 2.7 mi (4.3 km)

=== Kingsville–Bishop business loop ===
Business U.S. Highway 77
- Location: Kingsville–Bishop, Texas
- Length: 13.494 mi (21.716 km)
- Existed: June 21, 1990–present

Business U.S. Highway 77-V (Bus. US 77-V) is a 13-mile (21 km) business loop that runs through Kingsville and Bishop. The business loop's southern terminus begins at an intersection with US 77 and travels northwest and then turns to the north, eventually entering Kingsville. The route then turns to the northeast and then turns left onto S 14th Street, heading north. Bus. US 77-V then turns back to the northeast after leaving Kingsville and eventually enters Bishop after a few miles. After passing through Bishop, Bus. US 77-V then turns to the east and hits its northern terminus at another intersection with US 77.

=== Driscoll business loop ===
Business U.S. Highway 77
- Location: Driscoll, Texas
- Length: 4.9 mi (7.9 km)
- Existed: March 27, 2025–present

Business U.S. Highway 77 (Bus. US 77) is a 4.9-mile (7.9 km) business loop in Driscoll. The southern terminus of the business loop begins at an interchange with I-69E/US 77 and travels northeast into town, with the only major intersection being FM 665. The business loop runs mostly parallel with the mainline I-69E/US 77 and its northern terminus is at another interchange with the latter highway.

=== Robstown business loop ===
Business U.S. Highway 77
- Location: Robstown, Texas
- Length: 4.517 mi (7.269 km)
- Existed: June 21, 1990–present

Business U.S. Highway 77-U (Bus. US 77-U) is a 4.5-mile (7.2 km) business loop in Nueces County. The business loop's southern terminus begins at an intersection of I-69E and US 77 in southern Robstown, heading north into town. The business loop then intersects with Bus. SH 44-C, sharing a short overlap with the business loop before Bus. US 77-U splits away from Bus. SH 44-C, heading northeast. The business loop intersects with I-69E and US 77 and ends at its northern terminus north of Robstown after running parallel with the latter two highways on the frontage roads.

=== Odem business loop ===
Business U.S. Highway 77
- Location: Odem, Texas
- Length: 6.91 mi (11.12 km)

=== Sinton business loop ===
Business U.S. Highway 77
- Location: Sinton, Texas
- Length: 4.501 mi (7.244 km)
- Existed: June 21, 1990–present

Business U.S. Highway 77-T (Bus. US 77-T) is a 4.5-mile (7.2 km) business loop in Sinton. The business loop begins at an interchange with US 77 southwest of Sinton, turning northeast before intersecting with US 181 and SH 188. After a short overlap with both highways eastward, Bus. US 77-T turns back to the north and continues northeast until its northern terminus at another interchange with US 77 northeast of town.

=== Refugio business loop ===
Business U.S. Highway 77
- Location: Refugio, Texas
- Length: 13 mi (21 km)

=== Refugio–Hallettsville alternate route ===
Alternate U.S. Highway 77
- Location: Refugio–Hallettsville, Texas
- Length: 91.0 mi (146.5 km)
- Existed: October 29, 1953–present

Alternate US Highway 77 (Alt. US 77) is a north-south auxiliary route of US 77, located entirely within the state of Texas. The alternate route was commissioned in 1953 when the mainline US 77 was rerouted through southeast Texas. Alt. US 77 begins at an intersection in Refugio with the mainline US 77, sharing a concurrency with US 183. The two highways share a concurrency through Goliad and Cuero. SH 239 shares a short overlap with Alt. US 77 and US 183 through Goliad, and US 87 shares a concurrency with the two highways in Cuero. Alt. US 77 splits away from US 183, heading northeast through Yoakum, which also has a business loop of the highway. After passing through Yoakum, Alt. US 77 intersects and merges with Alt. US 90 just west of Hallettsville, where the two highways intersect with mainline US 77.

=== Victoria business loop ===
Business U.S. Highway 77
- Location: Victoria, Texas
- Length: 11.2 mi (18.0 km)
- Existed: April 25, 2002–present

Business U.S. Highway 77-S (Bus. US 77-S) is a 11.2-mile (18.0 km) business loop in Victoria. The loop's southern terminus begins at an interchange with US 77 and US 59 south of Victoria, traveling northward before reaching a grade separated interchange with Bus. US 59-T. Bus. US 77-S and Bus. US 59-T travel northeastward on Moody Street before making a sharp right curve eastward to Rio Grande Street. On Main Street, the two highways share a wrong-way concurrency with US 87 before Bus. US 77-S turns to the north onto Navarro Street. The business loop's northern terminus is at an intersection with US 77 and Loop 463 north of town.

=== Yoakum auxiliary business loop ===
Business Alternate U.S. Highway 77-Q
- Location: Yoakum, Texas
- Length: 2.909 mi (4.682 km)
- Existed: June 21, 1990–present

Alt. US 77 has one business loop in Yoakum. Officially designated by TxDOT as Business US 77-Q, it is signed with two auxiliary banners as Business Alternate US 77 (Bus. Alt. US 77). The route was originally established as Loop 51 in 1939 and was redesignated in 1991. The loop begins at Alt. US 77 south of Yoakum, then travels northwest into the city along Huck Street. It then turns north along Irvine Street, and has a brief concurrency with SH 111. It then turns northwest along Gonzales Street to an intersection with mainline Alt. US 77.

=== Waco business loop ===
Business U.S. Highway 77
- Location: Waco, Texas
- Length: 9.716 mi (15.636 km)
- Existed: June 21, 1990–present

Business U.S. Highway 77-L (Bus. US 77-L) is a 9.7-mile (15.6 km) business loop in Waco. The highway is the old alignment of US 77 through the city and was formerly signed as a US 77 and US 81 business loop, but designated as Loop 491 on October 2, 1970, until it was changed to the current Bus. US 77 designation on June 21, 1990. The section of highway from Loop 484 to US 84 is a freeway, making it the only business route in Texas that is a freeway.

=== Dallas business loop ===
Business U.S. Highway 77
- Location: Dallas, Texas
- Existed: October 25, 1990–May 28, 2015

== Oklahoma ==
=== Ardmore business loop ===
U.S. Highway 77 Business
- Location: Ardmore, Oklahoma
- Existed: August 3, 1964–July 2, 1984

=== Oklahoma City alternate route ===
U.S. Highway 77 Alternate
- Location: Oklahoma City, Oklahoma
- Existed: August 2, 1954–December 7, 1957

=== Perry business loop ===
U.S. Highway 77 Business
- Location: Perry, Oklahoma
- Existed: November 5, 1951–June 7, 1965

=== Ponca City alternate route ===
U.S. Highway 77 Alternate
- Location: Ponca City, Oklahoma
- Existed: September 11, 1950–October 6, 1952

U.S. Highway 77 City
- Location: Ponca City, Oklahoma
- Existed: October 6, 1952–January 15, 1957

U.S. Highway 77 Business
- Location: Ponca City, Oklahoma
- Existed: January 15, 1957–September 8, 1969

== Kansas ==
=== Arkansas City bypass route ===
U.S. Highway 77 Bypass
- Location: Arkansas City, Kansas
- Existed: May 14, 1958–August 12, 1970

U.S. Highway 77 Truck
- Location: Arkansas City, Kansas
- Existed: October 11, 1961–August 12, 1970

U.S. Highway 77 Business
- Location: Arkansas City, Kansas
- Existed: August 12, 1970–June 14, 1995

=== Herington business loop ===
U.S. Highway 77 Business
- Location: Herington, Kansas
- Existed: October 13, 1979–June 9, 1991

U.S. Route 77 Business (US-77 Bus.) was a short business loop through Herington, Kansas. US-77 Bus began at US-56 and US-77 south of Herington. US-77 Bus. ran north from here along with US-56 Bus. for 1.1 miles (1.8 km) then entered Herington. The highway then curved east and became Trapp Street. US-77 Bus. and US-56 Bus. then crossed Lime Creek then exited the city roughly 0.85 miles (1.37 km) later. The two business routes then reached their eastern terminus at US-56 and US-77.

US-77 Bus. was approved to be decommissioned in a meeting on June 9, 1991, leaving just US-56 Bus.

Major intersections

The entire route was in Dickinson County.

Location	mi	km	Destinations	Notes
	0.00	0.00	US-56 / US-77 / US 56 Bus. begins	Southern terminus; southern terminus of US-56 Bus.; southern end of US-56 Bus. overlap
			US-56 west / US-77 / US 56 Bus. ends	Northern terminus; northern terminus of US-56 Bus.; northern end of US-56 Bus. overlap
			US-56 east	Continuation beyond northern terminus
1.000 mi = 1.609 km; 1.000 km = 0.621 mi

=== Junction City business loop ===
U.S. Highway 77 Business
- Location: Junction City, Kansas
- Existed: October 13, 1979–December 2, 1988

U.S. Route 77 Business (US-77 Bus.) was a short business loop through Junction City, Kansas.

== See also ==
- List of special routes of the United States Numbered Highway System
