= Interstate 69E =

Interstate Highway in Texas, United States

Interstate 69E
- I-69E Future or proposed segments

Route information
- Auxiliary route of I-69
- Maintained by TxDOT
- Existed: December 5, 2011 (as I-69)–present
- NHS: Entire route

Eastern Lower Rio Grande Valley segment
- Length: 56.894 mi (91.562 km)
- South end: US 77 / US 83 in Brownsville
- Major intersections: I-169 / SH 550 Toll in Olmito; I-2 / US 83 in Harlingen
- North end: US 77 near Raymondville

Corpus Christi area segment
- Length: 34.780 mi (55.973 km)
- South end: US 77 south of Riviera (future); US 77 south of Kingsville
- North end: I-37 / US 77 in Corpus Christi

Location
- Country: United States
- State: Texas
- Counties: Cameron, Willacy; Kleberg, Nueces

Highway system
- Interstate Highway System; Main; Auxiliary; Suffixed; Business; Future; Highways in Texas; Interstate; US; State; Former; Toll; Loops; Spurs; FM/RM; Park; Rec
← I-69C	→ I-69W

Interstate 69E (I-69E (Note: Some sources use "IH-69E", as "IH" is an abbreviation used by TxDOT for Interstate Highways.)) is a north–south Interstate Highway running through South Texas. Once complete, the freeway will begin in Brownsville and head northward before terminating near Victoria as both I-69W and I-69E merge into I-69 toward Houston. For its entire length, I-69E runs concurrently with U.S. Highway 77 (US 77). The route currently exists in two segments: a 56.894-mile (91.562 km) segment from its southern terminus in Brownsville to the Willacy–Kenedy county line and a shorter 34.780-mile (55.973 km) segment south of Corpus Christi. The route has one auxiliary Interstate route, I-169 in Brownsville.

== Route description ==
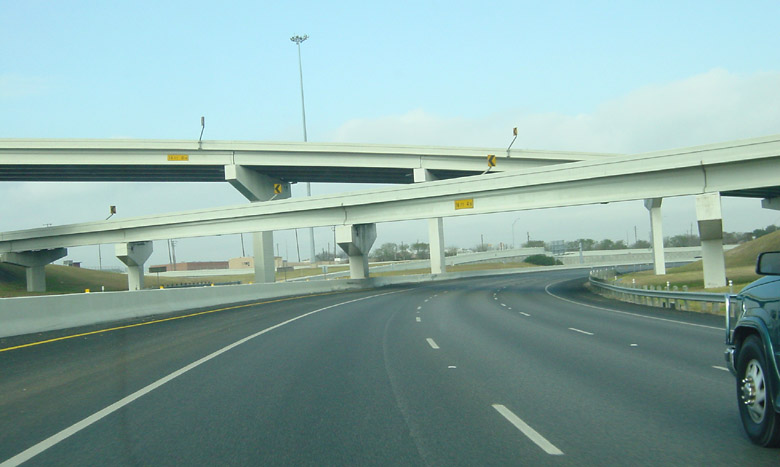
The interchange between I-37 and US 77 (Future I-69E corridor) in Corpus Christi in 2005

I-69E begins at an at-grade intersection just north of the Veterans International Bridge at Los Tomates in Brownsville. I-69E has a concurrency with US 77. I-69E intersects the eastern terminus of I-2 in Harlingen. After leaving Brownsville–Matamoros, I-69E temporarily ends and becomes US 77, a four-lane expressway. Another piece of I-69E picks up in Kingsville. I-69E passes through Bishop, Driscoll, and Robstown before terminating at a freeway-to-freeway style interchange with I-37 west of Corpus Christi.

== History ==
A stated goal of the Texas Department of Transportation's (TxDOT) I-69 initiative is that "existing suitable freeway sections of the proposed system be designated as I-69 as soon as possible". A bill was introduced and passed by the House of Representatives that allows Interstate quality sections of US 59, US 77, and US 281 to be signed as I-69 regardless of whether or not they connected to other Interstate Highways.

TxDOT submitted an application to the Federal Highway Administration (FHWA) and the American Association of State Highway and Transportation Officials (AASHTO) to designate 75 miles (121 km) of US 59 in Greater Houston and eight miles (13 km) of US 77 near Corpus Christi as I-69, as these sections are already built to Interstate Highway standards and connect to other Interstate Highways. In August 2011, TxDOT received approval from the FHWA for a six-mile (9.7 km) segment of US 77 between I-37 and State Highway 44 (SH 44) near Corpus Christi and was approved by AASHTO in October 2011. Officials held a ceremony on December 5, 2011, to unveil I-69 signs on the Robstown–Corpus Christi section.

The FHWA approved the designation for the eastern Lower Rio Grande Valley segment on May 24, 2013, and the Texas Transportation Commission followed suit on May 30, 2013. This action finalized the designations of not only I-69E but also of the sections of I-69C from Pharr north to the end of the US 281 freeway facility near Edinburg, and also I-2, which is a 46.8-mile (75.3 km) freeway that runs from Peñitas to Harlingen and connects with I-69C and I-69E. These approvals added over 100 miles (160 km) to the Interstate Highway System in the Lower Rio Grande Valley. The signage was installed in mid-2013.

As of 2025, the cluster consisting of the recently designated portions of I-69E, I-69C, and I-2 in the Lower Rio Grande Valley is not connected to the national Interstate network. This situation is slated to be remedied by scheduled projects to complete I-69E along US 77 between Raymondville and Robstown the southern end of the previously signed portion of the I-69 corridor connecting with I-37 west of Corpus Christi. The Environmental Protection Agency (EPA) approval for the upgrade of the US 77 alignment to Interstate standards, including bypasses of the towns along the 91-mile (146 km) routing, was obtained through a finding of no significant impact statement issued on July 13, 2012.

During its 2019 Annual Meeting in October 2019, AASHTO approved an extension of the I-69E designation along US 77 from Farm to Market Road 892 (FM 892) to FM 2826 in Nueces County. The 3.3-mile (5.3 km) extension completes I-69E from I-37 in Calallen to the north end of the Driscoll Bypass. The northbound lanes of the Driscoll Bypass opened in 2021 while the southbound lanes opened on August 16, 2023. An additional bypass is also expected to be constructed around Riviera as well. This project received $177.7 million in funding in August 2023 and construction began 2026. Most of the projects between Raymondville and Riviera are not funded but still planned. A project to make upgrades near Norias had an official groundbreaking on July 31, 2024; this project is expected to be completed in three to four years.

== Future ==
The section of I-69E north of Corpus Christi to Victoria is still in the early stages of development. Currently, plans have been released for I-69E to bypass Odem to the east (construction will start late-2032) and then Sinton (full bypass will start construction mid-2026); further north, it will be built through Woodsboro and then bypass Refugio. The Odem project has received partial funding while the others have received full funding. No other upgrade plans have been released. TxDOT held open houses in Refugio in late October 2023 in order to receive public feedback on the project.

== Exit list ==
County	Location	mi	km	Exit	Destinations	Notes
Cameron	Brownsville	0.000	0.000		To Veterans International Bridge	Bridge over the Rio Grande to Mexico; south end of US 77/US 83 concurrency
Cameron	Brownsville	0.000	0.000	Brownsville Veterans Port of Entry		
Cameron	Brownsville	0.210	0.338		University Boulevard / East Avenue	Traffic controlled level intersection
Cameron	Brownsville	0.210	0.338		Southern end of the freeway	
Cameron	Brownsville	0.321	0.517	0	Polk Street	Southbound exit only
Cameron	Brownsville	0.607– 1.491	0.977– 2.400	1A	SH 4 (International Boulevard) – International Airport, Gateway International Bridge	
Cameron	Brownsville	1.727– 1.780	2.779– 2.865	1B	12th Street / 14th Street	Southbound exit and northbound entrance
Cameron	Brownsville	2.322	3.737	1C	6th Street	Southbound exit and northbound entrance
Cameron	Brownsville	1.989– 3.328	3.201– 5.356	2	SH 48 (Boca Chica Boulevard) – Airport	
Cameron	Brownsville	2.594– 4.440	4.175– 7.145	3	Price Road / Old Alice Road	
Cameron	Brownsville	3.597– 5.702	5.789– 9.176	4	Bus. US 77 south / FM 802 (Ruben M. Torres Sr. Boulevard)	To Brownsville Baptist Medical Center
Cameron	Brownsville	4.450– 6.472	7.162– 10.416	5	Pablo Kisel Boulevard / Morrison Road	
Cameron	Brownsville	5.200	8.369	-	Morrison Road	Closed; was northbound exit and southbound entrance
Cameron	Brownsville	5.854– 7.022	9.421– 11.301	6	FM 3248 (Alton Gloor Boulevard)	To Valley Regional Medical Center
Cameron	Brownsville	7.193– 7.913	11.576– 12.735	7	Stillman Road / Old Alice Road	
Cameron	Brownsville	8.233– 8.988	13.250– 14.465	8	Merryman Road	
Cameron	Brownsville	9.083– 9.843	14.618– 15.841	9	FM 1732 – Olmito	
Cameron	Brownsville	9.962– 11.032	16.032– 17.754	10A	SH 550 to FM 511 – Port of Brownsville	
Cameron	Brownsville	10.725– 10.857	17.260– 17.473	10B	I-169 south / SH 550 Toll east – Port of Brownsville	Southbound exit and northbound entrance
Cameron	Brownsville	11.177– 12.304	17.988– 19.801	11	FM 803 – Rancho Viejo	
Cameron	Brownsville	12.502– 13.356	20.120– 21.494	12	Carmen Avenue	Road not connected yet
Cameron	Brownsville	13.525– 14.273	21.766– 22.970	13	Roberta Road	
Cameron	Brownsville	14.629– 15.395	23.543– 24.776	14	SH 100 / FM 1421 – South Padre Island	
Cameron	Brownsville	15.761– 17.254	25.365– 27.768	16	Frontage Road	
Cameron	Brownsville	16.400– 17.254	26.393– 27.768	Parking Area		
Cameron		16.400– 17.151	26.393– 27.602	17	Bus. US 77 north / FM 732 – San Benito	Northbound exit and southbound entrance
Cameron				-	Frontage Road	Closed; was northbound exit and southbound entrance
Cameron	San Benito	17.953– 18.748	28.893– 30.172	18	FM 510 / FM 732 – San Benito	
Cameron	San Benito	18.964– 20.708	30.520– 33.326	19A	McCulloch Street	No direct southbound exit (signed at exit 19B)
Cameron	San Benito	19.532– 20.512	31.434– 33.011	19B	SH 345 (Sam Houston Boulevard north) / FM 2520 (Sam Houston Boulevard south) / Ratliff Street	Ratliff Street signed at exit 21 southbound
Cameron	San Benito	20.512– 21.844	33.011– 35.155	21	Spur 486 (Williams Road) / Ratliff Street	
Cameron	San Benito	21.973– 22.724	35.362– 36.571	22	FM 509 (Paso Real Highway)	
Cameron	Harlingen	22.887– 23.903	36.833– 38.468	23A	Loop 499 east (Ed Carey Drive) / FM 801 west – Airport	To Valley Baptist Medical Center; signed as exit 23 northbound
Cameron	Harlingen	24.194– 24.805	38.936– 39.920	23B	New Hampshire Street	No direct northbound exit (signed at exit 23A)
Cameron	Harlingen	24.191– 25.732	38.932– 41.412	24	FM 1479 (Rangerville Road) / F Street	
Cameron	Harlingen	25.202	40.559	25	M Street	Northbound exit and southbound entrance
Cameron	Harlingen	25.756– 25.791	41.450– 41.507	26A	Lincoln Avenue	Northbound exit and southbound entrance
Cameron	Harlingen	26.178– 27.277	42.129– 43.898	26B	I-2 west / US 83 west – McAllen Bus. US 83 begins	Eastern terminus of westbound Bus. US 83; north end of US 83 overlap; south end of northbound Bus. US 83 overlap; I-2 exit 176; eastern terminus of I-2
Cameron	Harlingen	26.348– 26.975	42.403– 43.412	26C	Bus. US 83 west (Harrison Avenue) / Tyler Avenue (Spur 206 east) – Downtown	Eastern terminus of eastbound Bus. US 83; north end of northbound Bus. US 83 concurrency; Bus. US 83 not signed southbound
Cameron	Harlingen	27.441– 27.636	44.162– 44.476	27	Spur 54 west / Fairpark Boulevard east Bus. US 83 ends	No direct northbound exit (signed at exit 26C)
Cameron	Harlingen	27.754– 28.709	44.666– 46.203	28	FM 2994 (Wilson Road)	
Cameron	Harlingen–Combes line	28.981– 29.826	46.640– 48.000	29A	Bus. US 77 / Loop 499 (Primera Road)	Signed as exit 29 southbound
Cameron	Harlingen–Combes line	29.562	47.575	29B	Bus. US 77 north	Northbound exit only
Cameron	Combes	30.392– 31.187	48.911– 50.191	30	SH 107 / FM 508 – Santa Rosa, Rio Hondo	
Cameron		32.337– 33.165	52.041– 53.374	32	Bus. US 77 south	
Cameron		34.447– 35.224	55.437– 56.688	34	Orphanage Road / V Road	
Cameron				35	FM 1925 west / Outer Parkway	Proposed
Cameron		36.732– 37.689	59.114– 60.655	36	Bus. US 77 north – Sebastian	
Willacy	Sebastian	38.033– 38.785	61.208– 62.418	38	Spur 413 west / FM 2629 east	
Willacy	Sebastian	39.007– 39.853	62.776– 64.137	39	FM 1018	
Willacy		41.864	67.374	42A	FM 498 (Parker Road)	No direct southbound exit (signed at exit 42B)
Willacy	Lyford	42.556– 43.589	68.487– 70.150	42B	Spur 112 (Broadway Street)	
Willacy		44.150– 45.251	71.053– 72.824	44	Spur 56	
Willacy		45.617– 46.385	73.413– 74.649	45	FM 490	
Willacy	Raymondville	46.729– 47.584	75.203– 76.579	47	FM 3168	
Willacy	Raymondville	47.793– 48.654	76.915– 78.301	48	SH 186 – Raymondville, Port Mansfield	
Willacy		49.324	79.379	49	FM 1762 / Conley Road	No direct northbound exit (signed at exit 51)
Willacy		51.011 51.711	82.094 83.221	51	Bus. US 77 south – Raymondville	Mileposts at northern end of the exit reflect US 77
Willacy		52.669– 53.157	84.763– 85.548	52	Frontage Road	Northbound exit and southbound entrance
Willacy		54.000	86.905	54	Yturria County Road, H Yturria, La Chata North Gate	
Willacy–Kenedy county line		56.000	90.123	56	Thomas Ranch Road, H Yturria, Punta Del Monte	
Willacy–Kenedy county line	Gap in route, connection made via US 77					
Kenedy		84.610	136.167	85	Inspection Station	Northbound exit and entrance
Kenedy		92.700	149.186	93	Kenedy County Safety Rest Area	
Kenedy	Sarita	98.790	158.987	99	La Parra Avenue	Proposed
Kleberg	Riviera	103.000	165.762	103	Bus. US 77 north	Proposed
Kleberg	Riviera	104.160	167.629	104	FM 771 east – Riviera Beach	Proposed
Kleberg	Riviera	106.400	171.234	106	Bus. US 77 south	Proposed
Kleberg		107.650	173.246	108	RM 628 east – Loyola Beach	Proposed
Kleberg		111.280	179.088	112	FM 772	Proposed
Kleberg	Ricardo	113.490	182.644	114	FM 1118 east	Proposed
Kleberg	Kingsville	115.680	186.169	116	Bus. US 77 north / East County Road 2120	Opened 2024
Kleberg	Kingsville	117.420	188.969	118	FM 1717 east (South Brahma Boulevard)	Opened 2024
Kleberg	Kingsville	118.250	190.305	119	FM 1356 (General Cavazos Boulevard)	No northbound entrance; access to CHRISTUS Spohn Hospital
Kleberg	Kingsville	119.070	191.625	120A	FM 425 (Senator Carlos Truan Boulevard)	Northbound exit only
Kleberg	Kingsville	119.660– 120.280	192.574– 193.572	120B	SH 141 (King Avenue) / Kenedy Avenue / Caesar Avenue	Signed as exit 120 southbound
Kleberg	Kingsville	120.770– 121.310	194.360– 195.230	122	FM 1898 (Corral Avenue) / FM 2045 (Santa Gertudis Avenue)	
Kleberg		121.890	196.163	123	Sage Road	Southbound exit only
Kleberg		123.310	198.448	124	Embarque	
Nueces		125.080	201.297	126	County Road 4	Northbound exit and southbound entrance
Nueces	Bishop	126.320	203.292	127	FM 257 – Bishop	Opened 2023
Nueces	Bishop	127.080	204.515	128	FM 70 – Chapman Ranch, Agua Dulce	Opened 2023
Nueces		128.140	206.221	129	Bus. US 77 south / County Road 10	Opened 2018
Nueces		129.140	207.831	130	FM 3354 / County Road 12 – Bishop Airport	Opened 2021
Nueces	Driscoll	131.670	211.902	132	Bus. US 77 – Driscoll	Northbound exit and southbound entrance; opened 2023
Nueces	Driscoll	133.400	214.686	134	FM 665	Opened 2023
Nueces	Driscoll	135.430	217.953	136	Bus. US 77 – Driscoll	Southbound exit and northbound entrance; opened 2023
Nueces	La Paloma-Lost Creek	138.730	223.264	139	FM 2826 / Conley Road	
Nueces	Robstown	141.578	227.848	141	County Road 36	Southbound exit and northbound entrance; mileposts at the southern end of the exit reflect US 77
Nueces	Robstown	142.693	229.642	142	FM 892	No direct northbound exit (signed at exit 140)
Nueces	Robstown	142.097– 143.986	228.683– 231.723	143 (EB) 144 (WB)	SH 44 – Robstown, Corpus Christi, Alice	Split into east and west exits northbound
Nueces	Robstown	144.643	232.780	145	County Road 44	Northbound exit and southbound entrance
Nueces		146.729– 147.360	236.137– 237.153	147A	Bus. US 77 south to SH 44 west / County Road 48 – Robstown, Alice	
Nueces	Corpus Christi	147.939	238.085	147B	County Road 52	No direct northbound exit (signed at exit 148)
Nueces	Corpus Christi	148.429– 148.532	238.873– 239.039	148	FM 624 (Northwest Boulevard) / Leopard Street	To Corpus Christi Medical Center-Northwest; southbound exit and northbound entrance only
Nueces	Corpus Christi	148.663– 148.811	239.250– 239.488	149A	I-37 south – Corpus Christi	Exit 14A on I-37 northbound.
Nueces	Corpus Christi	149.253– 149.387	240.199– 240.415	149B-C	I-37 north – San Antonio Sharpsburg Road	Southern end of I-37 concurrency; signed as 149B (I-37 north) and 149C (Sharpsburg Road). Current northern terminus of I-69E segment; and on Sharpsburg Road, northbound exit only.
San Patricio		151.730	244.186	151	I-37 north – San Antonio	Proposed northern end of I-37 concurrency; exit 17 northbound.
San Patricio	Odem				Bus. US 77 / CR 56 / CR 47 – Odem	Bus. US 77 not signed southbound
San Patricio	Odem				CR 49	Northbound exit and southbound entrance
San Patricio					CR 2289 to FM 631	
San Patricio					CR 42 / FM 1944	
San Patricio					CR 82 / CR 82A	CR 82A not signed southbound
San Patricio	Sinton			161	Bus. US 77 / Bus. US 77 / FM 1945 west – San Patricio	FM 1945/Bus. US 77 (Sinton) not signed southbound (signed at SH 188)
San Patricio	Sinton			162	County Rd 1196	Existing interchanges of US 77 (conversion to Interstate standards)
San Patricio	Sinton			163	SH 188 – Sinton	Existing interchanges of US 77 (conversion to Interstate standards)
San Patricio	Sinton			164	US 181 – Beeville	Existing interchanges of US 77 (conversion to Interstate standards)
San Patricio	Sinton			165	SH 89 to US 181 – Beeville, Portland	Existing interchanges of US 77 (conversion to Interstate standards)
San Patricio	Sinton			166	Bus. US 77	Existing interchanges of US 77 (conversion to Interstate standards)
Refugio	Woodsboro				FM 2441 / FM 1360 – Woodsboro	FM 2441 not signed northbound, FM 1360 not signed southbound
Refugio					Toup Road	
Refugio					Bus. US 77 – Refugio	
Refugio	Refugio				FM 774 – Refugio	
Refugio					US 183 north / US 77 Alt. to SH 202 – Goliad, Beeville	
Refugio					Bus. US 77 – Refugio	
Refugio					SH 239 – Tivoli, Goliad	Interchange
Victoria					FM 445 east / San Antonio River Road west – McFaddin	
Victoria	Victoria	222.300	357.757	222	US 77 north to Bus. US 77 north (Refugio Highway) / I-69W west / US 59 south – Victoria, Laredo	I-69W will go west along US 59 to Laredo; future north end of US 77 concurrency
Victoria	Victoria	223.800	360.171	–	I-69 north / US 59 north – Houston	I-69 will go north along US 59 to Houston; future northern terminus
1.000 mi = 1.609 km; 1.000 km = 0.621 mi: Closed/former; Concurrency terminus; Incomplete access; Route transition; Unopened

== See also ==
- List of Interstate Highways in Texas
