= Austwell-Tivoli High School =

Coordinates: 28.4572°N 96.8912°W

Location
- 207 Redfish St; Tivoli, Texas 77990-4500; United States

Information
- School type: Public high school
- School district: Austwell-Tivoli Independent School District
- Principal: Eric Cortez
- Teaching staff: 10.97 (FTE)
- Grades: 7-12
- Enrollment: 68 (2023-2024)
- Student to teacher ratio: 6.20
- Colors: Red & Black
- Athletics conference: UIL Class A
- Mascot: Redfish/Lady Redfish
- Yearbook: Redfish
- Website: Austwell-Tivoli High School

Austwell-Tivoli High School is a public secondary school located in unincorporated Tivoli, (USA) and classified as a 1A school by the UIL. It is part of the Austwell-Tivoli Independent School District located in eastern Refugio County. In 2015, the school was rated "Met Standard" by the Texas Education Agency.

== Athletics ==
The Austwell-Tivoli Redfish compete in these sports -

Volleyball, Cross Country, Basketball, Golf, Tennis & Track

=== State Finalist ===
- Volleyball -
  - 1977(B)
