= Texas State Highway 141 =

State highway in Texas

State Highway 141
- SH 141 highlighted in red

Route information
- Maintained by TxDOT
- Length: 16.272 mi (26.187 km)
- Existed: 1929–present

Major junctions
- West end: Future I-69C / US 281 / FM 2295
- East end: I-69E / US 77 in Kingsville

Location
- Country: United States
- State: Texas
- Counties: Jim Wells, Kleberg

Highway system
- Highways in Texas; Interstate; US; State; Former; Toll; Loops; Spurs; FM/RM; Park; Rec
← SH 140	→ SH 142

State Highway 141 (SH 141) is a Texas state highway in Jim Wells and Kleberg counties.

== Route description ==
The western terminus of SH 141 is at US 281 (Future I-69C) in Jim Wells County; the continuation past US 281 to Benavides is designated FM 2295. The route travels east into Kleberg County and into the city of Kingsville, where it ends at I-69E/US 77.

== History ==
SH 141 was originally designated on September 18, 1929, from Kingsville west to Benavides, but was shortened to its current route on July 15, 1935, because the section from SH 66 to Benavides was never built. The designation was extended slightly to the east, to the bypass of US 77 in Kingsville, on June 26, 1962.

== Major intersections ==
County	Location	mi	km	Destinations	Notes
Jim Wells		0.0	0.0	Future I-69C / US 281 / FM 2295 west – Alice, Ben Bolt, Falfurrias, Premont	Western terminus; eastern terminus of FM 2295; U.S. 281 is the future Interstate 69C
Kleberg	Kingsville	13.7	22.0	Spur 169 north (University Boulevard) – Texas A&M University–Kingsville	Southern terminus of Spur 169
Kleberg	Kingsville	15.3	24.6	Bus. US 77 (14th Street)	
Kleberg	Kingsville	16.3	26.2	I-69E / US 77 – Raymondville, Bishop, Robstown	Eastern terminus; I-69E exit 120B
1.000 mi = 1.609 km; 1.000 km = 0.621 mi
