= Prospect, Clay County, Texas =

Ghost town in Texas, US

Prospect
- Location in Texas
- Coordinates: 33.4828856°N 98.1914336°W
- Country: United States
- State: Texas
- Texas: Clay
- Elevation: 1,079 ft (329 m)
- USGS Feature ID: 1380400

Prospect is a ghost town in Clay County, Texas, United States.

== History ==
Prospect is situated on Texas State Highway 188. It was established in the early 1880s, and was used as a trade center for farmers and ranchers. A post office was established in 1893, and closed after 1930. The settlement was abandoned by the 1950s.
