= U.S. Route 77 in Texas =

Section of U.S. Highway in Texas, United States

U.S. Highway 77
- Blue Star Memorial Highway
- US 77 highlighted in red

Route information
- Maintained by TxDOT
- Length: 471.296 mi (Note: The certified mileage given is shorter than the actual mileage as TxDOT considers US77 to be discontinuous at rather than concurrent with Interstate Highways and US Highways with lower numbers.) (758.477 km)
- Existed: 1927–present

Major junctions
- South end: Mexican border in Brownsville
- I-69E in Raymondville; I-2 / US 83 in Harlingen; I-69E from Robstown to Corpus Christi; I-37 in Corpus Christi; I-10 near Schulenburg; I-35 in Waco; I-20 in Dallas; I-30 / US 67 in Dallas; I-635 in Dallas
- North end: I-35 / US 77 near Gainesville

Location
- Country: United States
- State: Texas
- Counties: Cameron, Willacy, Kenedy, Kleberg, Nueces, San Patricio, Refugio, Victoria, DeWitt, Lavaca, Fayette, Lee, Milam, Falls, McLennan, Hill, Ellis, Dallas, Denton, Cooke

Highway system
- United States Numbered Highway System; List; Special; Divided; Highways in Texas; Interstate; US; State; Former; Toll; Loops; Spurs; FM/RM; Park; Rec
← SH 76	→ SH 77

U.S. Route 77 (US 77) is a major highway that is part of the United States Numbered Highway System that runs from the Veterans International Bridge in Brownsville to Sioux City, Iowa. In Texas, the road runs south-north for 471.3 miles (758.5 km) from the International border with Mexico to the Oklahoma state line north of Gainesville. The highway is being upgraded to a freeway near Corpus Christi to connect to the freeway part of the highway in Raymondville as part of future I-69. A freeway in Robstown is already signed as part of I-69. From Waco to the Oklahoma state line, US 77 overlaps or runs parallel to I-35/I-35E.

== Route description ==
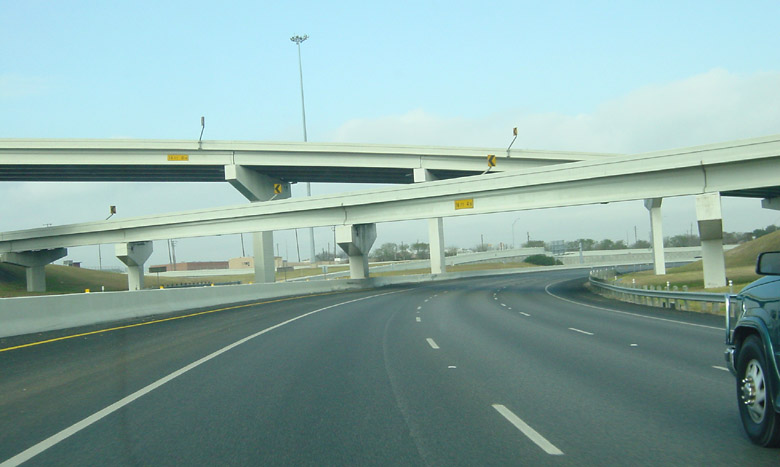
The interchange between I-37 and US 77/I-69E

US 77 crosses the Rio Grande with US 83 on the Veterans International Bridge. The two highways run together concurrent with I-69E until Harlingen. US 83 runs west (north) along I-2 to McAllen while US 77 runs north along with I-69E to Raymondville where the I-69E designation temporarily ends. North of Raymondville, the highway passes through Kenedy County, serving the county seat of Sarita; US 77 is the only state-maintained route to run through the county.

In Robstown, US 77 again picks up the I-69E designation until the interchange with I-37 in north Corpus Christi. US 77 shares a short overlap with I-37 before leaving the highway. US 77 runs through many small to mid-size communities before arriving in Waco. Here, US 77 begins its overlap with I-35 that lasts until Hillsboro, where the highway then parallels I-35E until Red Oak. North of Red Oak, US 77 overlaps I-35E through Dallas, leaving the interstate again in Denton. In Denton, US 77 is a suburban road that serves the downtown area and has an overlap with US 377 in the town, intersecting US 380 near Texas Women's University. After an interchange with Loop 288, US 77 rejoins I-35 in north Denton. US 77 remains concurrent with I-35 through Gainesville then crosses the Red River into Oklahoma.

== History ==
US 77 was designated in 1927 from Gainesville to Corpus Christi. In 1943, the highway was extended south of Corpus Christi to the international border at Brownsville; this extension also rerouted the section of highway between Sinton and Corpus Christi, as the previous route traveled through Gregory between the two towns. In 1953, US 77 was rerouted between Halletsville and Victoria over former SH 295. The section of highway through Victoria was rerouted in 1978 to remove a concurrency with US 59, but this was cancelled the following year. In 1997, US 77 was extended so the highway's official designation ran to the Los Tomates International Bridge in Brownsville. In 2000, the city of Denton turned US 77 into a pair of one-ways streets from US 377 to FM 2164, with northbound traffic using Locust Street and southbound traffic using Elm Street. In 2003, the section of US 77 in Robstown between FM 892 and 9th Street was removed the state highway system as construction of a bypass around the town began.

In August 2011, TxDOT received permission from the Federal Highway Administration (FHWA) to designate the Robstown bypass as I-69 due to it already being built to Interstate Highway standards and connecting to another Interstate Highway; the American Association of State Highway and Transportation Officials (AASHTO) approved the designation later that year in October. An official ceremony was held on December 5, 2011 to unveil I-69 signs on the Robstown-Corpus Christi freeway. This section of the highway was later re-designated as I-69E in 2013, though most of the original I-69 signage is still in place.

The section of freeway in the East Rio Grande Valley received approval for Interstate designation in May 2013. This section of highway was designated as I-69E as the two other branches of I-69, I-69C and I-69W were also approved. Signage was installed over the summer of 2013.

In January 2025, TxDOT re-routed US 77 to the west of Downtown Denton, removing the Locust Street/Elm Street segment and shifting the US 77 designation to I-35 and I-35E, thus extending the I-35/US 77 concurrency between the FM 1173 and Dallas Drive exits.

== Future ==
US 77 from Raymondville to Victoria is planned to be upgraded to I-69E. South of Corpus Christi, US 77 is a freeway around most of Kingsville, with interchanges being constructed at US 77 Bus. and FM 1717 south of the town that would complete the freeway in Kingsville. A freeway section of US 77 also exists in the town of Bishop, with a bypass of Driscoll recently finishing construction, with the northbound lanes opened to traffic in 2021 while the southbound lanes opened in August 2023; making the freeway complete from I-37 to Kingsville.

Between Corpus Christi and Victoria, US 77 is still mostly a divided highway that does not bypass most of the towns it travels through. As of June 2022, Sinton is the only town along this section of US 77 that the highway bypasses. A bypass for Refugio, Texas is planned. Once completed, I-69E will end at I-69W (US 59) in Victoria, with those two Interstates forming I-69.

== Major intersections ==
County	Location	mi	km	Destinations	Notes
Cameron	Brownsville	0.0	0.0	Veterans International Bridge at Los Tomates over the Rio Grande; South end of US 83 overlap	
Cameron	Brownsville	0.9	1.4	University Boulevard / East Avenue - UT-Brownsville, Texas Southmost College	at-grade intersection
overlap; see I-69E
Kenedy		99.6	160.3	Sarita	interchange
Kleberg	Riviera	105.8	170.3	FM 771 east – Riviera Beach	
Kleberg	Riviera	105.9	170.4	SH 285 west – Falfurrias	
Kleberg		108.7	174.9	RM 628 east – Loyola Beach	
Kleberg		112.4	180.9	FM 772	
Kleberg	Ricardo	114.6	184.4	FM 1118 east	
Kleberg	Kingsville	116.5	187.5	Bus. US 77 / County Road 2120	interchange under construction
Kleberg	Kingsville	118.6	190.9	FM 1717 east	interchange under construction
Kleberg	Kingsville	119.3	192.0	FM 1356 (General Cavazos Boulevard)	interchange; south end of freeway; access to CHRISTUS Spohn Hospital
Kleberg	Kingsville	120.0	193.1	FM 425 (Senator Carlos Truan Boulevard) / Caesar Avenue	
Kleberg	Kingsville	120.5	193.9	SH 141 (King Avenue) / Kenedy Avenue / Caesar Avenue	
Kleberg	Kingsville	122.1	196.5	FM 1898 (Corral Avenue) / FM 2045 (Santa Gertrudis Avenue)	
Kleberg		123.1	198.1	Sage Road	
Kleberg		124.0	199.6	Embarque	
Nueces	Bishop	126.0	202.8	FM 257 / FM 70 – Bishop, Chapman Ranch, Agua Dulce	
Nueces		129.0	207.6	Bus. US 77 / County Road 10	
Nueces		130.1	209.4	FM 3354 – Bishop Airport	
Nueces	Driscoll	132.0	212.4	Bus. US 77 – Driscoll	northbound exit and southbound entrance
Nueces	Driscoll	134.4	216.3	FM 665	
Nueces	Driscoll	136.0	218.9	Bus. US 77 – Driscoll	southbound exit and northbound entrance
Nueces		139.3	224.2	FM 2826 I-69E begins	interchange; current southern terminus of I-69E
Nueces	overlap; see I-69E				
Nueces	Corpus Christi	149.8	241.1	I-37 south – Corpus Christi	current north end of I-69E overlap; south end of I-37 overlap; US 77 south follows exit 14
Nueces	Corpus Christi	150.4	242.0	Sharpsburg Road / Redbird Lane	I-37 exit 15
Nueces	Corpus Christi	152.0	244.6	Labonte Park	I-37 exit 16
San Patricio		152.8	245.9	I-37 north – San Antonio	north end of I-37 overlap; US 77 north follows exit 17
San Patricio	Odem	157.3	253.1	SH 234 west / FM 631 east (Main Street) – Edroy, Taft	
San Patricio		159.2	256.2	FM 1944 east – Taft	
San Patricio	Sinton	162.2	261.0	Bus. US 77 north / FM 1945 west	interchange
San Patricio	Sinton	164.1	264.1	SH 188 – Mathis	interchange
San Patricio	Sinton	165.2	265.9	US 181 – Beeville	interchange
San Patricio	Sinton	166.0	267.2	SH 89 to US 181 – Beeville, Gregory	interchange
San Patricio	Sinton	167.2	269.1	Bus. US 77	interchange
Refugio	Woodsboro	183.2	294.8	FM 1360 south	
Refugio	Woodsboro	183.4	295.2	FM 136 south – Woodsboro, Bayside	
Refugio	Woodsboro	183.7	295.6	FM 2441 north	
Refugio	Refugio	188.5	303.4	FM 774 east (Empresario Street) – Austwell	
Refugio	Refugio	189.9	305.6	US 77 Alt. north / US 183 north – Goliad	
Refugio		209.6	337.3	SH 239 – Tivoli, Goliad	interchange
Victoria		212.7	342.3	FM 445 east – McFaddin	
Victoria	Victoria	223.5	359.7	US 59 (via Spur 91) – Houston, Victoria	Exit 7 on I-69/US 59 southbound; interchange; northbound exit and southbound entrance; future I-69 north
Victoria	Victoria	224.7	361.6	US 59 north / Bus. US 77 north – Houston, Victoria	interchange; south end of US 59 overlap
Victoria	Victoria	227.1	365.5	FM 446	
Victoria	Victoria	228.3	367.4	US 59 south / Bus. US 59-T north – Goliad, Laredo	interchange; north end of US 59 overlap
Victoria	Victoria	232.0	373.4	FM 236	interchange; south end of freeway
Victoria	Victoria	233.3	375.5	FM 1685	no direct northbound exit (signed at FM 236)
Victoria	Victoria	236.5	380.6	US 87 – Cuero	
Victoria	Victoria	237.1	381.6	Briggs Boulevard / Nursery Drive	no direct northbound exit
Victoria	Victoria	237.3	381.9	Mallette Drive / Invitational Drive	
Victoria	Victoria	238.4	383.7	Bus. US 77 south / Loop 463 east – Edna	interchange; north end of freeway
Victoria		252.8	406.8	FM 444 south – Inez	
Victoria		254.2	409.1	FM 682 north – Terryville, Yoakum	
DeWitt	No major junctions				
Lavaca		261.5	420.8	SH 111 – Edna, Yoakum	interchange
Lavaca		268.5	432.1	FM 531 – Koerth, Ezzell	
Lavaca		278.4	448.0	FM 318 south – Sweet Home	
Lavaca	Hallettsville	279.1	449.2	US 77 Alt. south / US 90 Alt. west	south end of US 90 Alt. overlap
Lavaca	Hallettsville	279.7	450.1	US 90 Alt. east – Eagle Lake	north end of US 90 Alt. overlap
Lavaca	Hallettsville	279.9	450.5	FM 957 north (East First Street)	
Lavaca		288.1	463.7	FM 532 east – Oakland	south end of FM 532 overlap
Lavaca		288.7	464.6	FM 532 west – Komensky, Moulton	north end of FM 532 overlap
Fayette	Schulenburg	296.2	476.7	Loop 222	
Fayette	Schulenburg	296.9	477.8	US 90 – Flatonia, Weimar	
Fayette	Schulenburg	297.7	479.1	I-10 – Flatonia, San Antonio, Weimar, Houston	I-10 exit 674
Fayette		299.4	481.8	FM 615 east	
Fayette		302.1	486.2	FM 956 west – Freyburg	
Fayette	Swiss Alp	304.3	489.7	FM 1383 south – Ammannsville	
Fayette	Swiss Alp	305.1	491.0	FM 3171 south	
Fayette		307.7	495.2	FM 2436 west – Hostyn	
Fayette		311.9	502.0	Spur 92 west / FM 155 south – Monument Hill Kreische Brewery State Park, Weimar	
Fayette	La Grange	313.5	504.5	Bus. SH 71 to SH 159 – Smithville, Brenham	
Fayette	La Grange	314.6	506.3	SH 71 – Smithville, Austin, Columbus	interchange
Fayette		316.2	508.9	FM 2145 north – Nechanitz	
Fayette		320.3	515.5	FM 153 west – Winchester, Smithville	
Fayette	Warda	324.6	522.4	FM 1482 west	
Lee	Giddings	333.5	536.7	FM 448 south	
Lee	Giddings	333.9	537.4	US 290 (Austin Street)	
Lee	Giddings	334.4	538.2	FM 2440 (Independence Street)	
Lee		340.1	547.3	FM 1624 north – Fedor, Lexington	
Lee		342.4	551.0	SH 21 – Bastrop, Caldwell	interchange
Lee		346.5	557.6	FM 3403 east	
Lee	Lexington	350.1	563.4	Loop 123 north / FM 696 west to FM 112 / FM 1624 – Taylor, Elgin	south end of FM 696 overlap
Lee	Lexington	350.4	563.9	FM 696 east	north end of FM 696 overlap
Lee	Lexington	351.7	566.0	Loop 123 south to FM 112 / FM 696 / FM 1624	
Milam		364.8	587.1	FM 487 north	
Milam	Rockdale	367.1	590.8	FM 908 – Caldwell, Airport	
Milam	Rockdale	369.2	594.2	US 79 – Hearne, Round Rock	interchange
Milam		374.9	603.3	FM 1712 south – Rockdale	
Milam		381.1	613.3	US 190 east / SH 36 south – Milano	south end of US 190 / SH 36 overlap
Milam		382.0	614.8	FM 2095 east – Gause	
Milam	Cameron	384.6	619.0	US 190 west / SH 36 north	north end of US 190 / SH 36 overlap
Milam	Splawn	389.3	626.5	FM 485 – Hearne, Seaton	
Milam	Ben Arnold	392.4	631.5	FM 1444 east – Clarkson	
Milam	Burlington	395.5	636.5	FM 1963 north – Barclay	
Falls		397.4	639.6	FM 1445 south – Clarkson	
Falls	Rosebud	400.3	644.2	Loop 265 north / FM 1963 south (Main Street) – Reagan, Barclay	
Falls	Rosebud	401.1	645.5	SH 53 west – Temple	
Falls		402.5	647.8	Loop 265 south to FM 413 – Reagan	
Falls	Travis	405.0	651.8	FM 431 east – Cedar Springs	south end of FM 431 overlap
Falls	Travis	405.1	651.9	FM 431 west – Westphalia	north end of FM 431 overlap
Falls	Lott	410.1	660.0	SH 320 – Temple, Marlin	
Falls		413.8	665.9	FM 935 – Troy, Marlin	
Falls		415.6	668.8	SH 7 east – Marlin	south end of SH 7 overlap
Falls		416.3	670.0	FM 1950 west – Cego	
Falls		416.6	670.5	SH 7 west / Bus. SH 7 east – Bruceville-Eddy	interchange; north end of SH 7 overlap
Falls	Golinda	422.3	679.6	FM 2839 east	
McLennan		424.0	682.4	FM 2643 west – Levi, Mooreville	south end of FM 2643 overlap
McLennan		424.1	682.5	FM 2643 east – Asa	north end of FM 2643 overlap
McLennan	Robinson	425.7	685.1	FM 2837 west – Lorena	
McLennan	Robinson	428.7	689.9	FM 3148 west – Hewitt	
McLennan	Waco–Robinson line	431.5	694.4	SH 6 / Loop 340 – Meridian, Marlin	interchange
McLennan	Waco	433.3	697.3	Loop 396 north – Austin, Fort Worth, Dallas	traffic circle
McLennan	Waco	434.0	698.5	Bus. US 77 north (La Salle Avenue)	
McLennan	Waco	434.5	699.3	I-35 south (Jack Kultgen Expressway) / South 17th Street (Loop 2) – Austin	south end of I-35 overlap; US 77 south follows exit 334
see I-35
Hill	Hillsboro	470.7	757.5	I-35 north / Spur 579 south – Fort Worth, Dallas	north end of I-35 overlap; US 77 north follows exit 370
Hill	Carl's Corner	474.2	763.2	FM 2959 west to I-35E	
Hill	Midway	477.4	768.3	FM 934 west – Itasca	
Hill		478.4	769.9	FM 1243 south – Brandon	
Ellis	Milford	481.3	774.6	FM 308 south – Malone	south end of FM 308 overlap
Ellis	Milford	481.6	775.1	FM 566 west to I-35E	
Ellis		482.3	776.2	FM 308 north – Maypearl	north end of FM 308 overlap
Ellis	Italy	486.7	783.3	SH 34 to I-35E – Ennis	
Ellis	Forreston	492.2	792.1	FM 329 west to I-35E	
Ellis	Nena	496.9	799.7	FM 55 south – Avalon	
Ellis	Waxahachie	499.3	803.5	I-35E – Dallas	I-35E exit 397
Ellis	Waxahachie	500.9	806.1	FM 66 west (Rogers Street) / FM 877 south (Howard Road)	
Ellis	Waxahachie	501.4	806.9	Bus. US 287 (West Main Street)	
Ellis	Waxahachie	502.0	807.9	FM 878 east (West Marvin Avenue)	
Ellis	Waxahachie	503.8	810.8	US 287 – Fort Worth, Corsicana	interchange
Ellis		506.6	815.3	FM 387 to I-35E / FM 813	
Ellis	Red Oak	508.9	819.0	SH 342 north – Red Oak	
Ellis	Red Oak	509.4	819.8	I-35E south – Waco	south end of I-35E overlap; US 77 south follows exit 408
see I-35E
Denton	Denton	565.3	909.8	I-35E north – Oklahoma City	north end of I-35E overlap; US 77 north follows exit 464
Denton	Denton	567.0	912.5	US 377 south (Fort Worth Drive)	south end of US 377 overlap
Denton	Denton	567.7	913.6	FM 426 east (McKinney Street)	
Denton	Denton	568.6	915.1	US 377 north / US 380 (University Drive)	north end of US 377 overlap
Denton	Denton	568.7	915.2	FM 428 east (Sherman Drive)	
Denton	Denton	569.3	916.2	FM 2164 north (Locust Street)	
Denton	Denton	571.5	919.7	Loop 288 / US 380 Truck	interchange
Denton	Denton	572.4	921.2	I-35 south to FM 1173 – Krum	south end of I-35 overlap; US 77 south follows exit 471
see I-35
Cooke		605.3	974.1	I-35 north / US 77 north – Ardmore, Oklahoma City	Oklahoma state line (bridge over Red River)
1.000 mi = 1.609 km; 1.000 km = 0.621 mi

== Related highways ==
US 77 has nine designated business loops in Texas, between the one in Waco and the mainline highway's southern terminus at the Mexico border. US 77 also has one auxiliary route designated as Alt. US 77, which is a 91-mile (146 km) alternate route of US 77, located entirely in the state of Texas, running from Hallettsville to Refugio. Alt. US 77 also has a designated business loop in Yoakum, labeled "Business Alternate US 77-Q".

=== Driscoll business loop ===
Business U.S. Highway 77
- Location: Driscoll
- Length: 4.9 mi (7.9 km)
- Existed: March 27, 2025–present

Business U.S. Highway 77 (Bus. US 77) is a 4.9-mile (7.9 km) business loop in Driscoll. The southern terminus of the business loop begins at an interchange with I-69E/US 77 and travels northeast into town, with the only major intersection being FM 665. The business loop runs mostly parallel with the mainline I-69E/US 77 and its northern terminus is at another interchange with the latter highway.

=== Waco business loop ===
Business U.S. Highway 77
- Location: Waco
- Length: 9.716 mi (15.636 km)
- Existed: June 21, 1990–present

Business U.S. Highway 77-L (Bus. US 77-L) is a 9.7-mile (15.6 km) business loop in Waco. The highway is the old alignment of US 77 through the city and was formerly signed as a US 77 and US 81 business loop, but designated as Loop 491 on October 2, 1970, until it was changed to the current Bus. US 77 designation on June 21, 1990. The section of highway from Loop 484 to US 84 is a freeway, making it the only business route in Texas that is a freeway.

=== Victoria business loop ===
Business U.S. Highway 77
- Location: Victoria
- Length: 11.2 mi (18.0 km)
- Existed: April 25, 2002–present

Business U.S. Highway 77-S (Bus. US 77-S) is a 11.2-mile (18.0 km) business loop in Victoria. The loop's southern terminus begins at an interchange with US 77 and US 59 south of Victoria, traveling northward before reaching a grade separated interchange with Bus. US 59-T. Bus. US 77-S and Bus. US 59-T travel northeastward on Moody Street before making a sharp right curve eastward to Rio Grande Street. On Main Street, the two highways share a wrong-way concurrency with US 87 before Bus. US 77-S turns to the north onto Navarro Street. The business loop's northern terminus is at an intersection with US 77 and Loop 463 north of town.

=== Sinton business loop ===
Business U.S. Highway 77
- Location: Sinton
- Length: 4.501 mi (7.244 km)
- Existed: June 21, 1990–present

Business U.S. Highway 77-T (Bus. US 77-T) is a 4.5-mile (7.2 km) business loop in Sinton. The business loop begins at an interchange with US 77 southwest of Sinton, turning northeast before intersecting with US 181 and SH 188. After a short overlap with both highways eastward, Bus. US 77-T turns back to the north and continues northeast until its northern terminus at another interchange with US 77 northeast of town.

=== Robstown business loop ===
Business U.S. Highway 77
- Location: Nueces County
- Length: 4.517 mi (7.269 km)
- Existed: June 21, 1990–present

Business U.S. Highway 77-U (Bus. US 77-U) is a 4.5-mile (7.2 km) business loop in Nueces County. The business loop's southern terminus begins at an intersection of I-69E and US 77 in southern Robstown, heading north into town. The business loop then intersects with Bus. SH 44-C, sharing a short overlap with the business loop before Bus. US 77-U splits away from Bus. SH 44-C, heading northeast. The business loop intersects with I-69E and US 77 and ends at its northern terminus north of Robstown after running parallel with the latter two highways on the frontage roads.

=== Kingsville–Bishop business loop ===
Business U.S. Highway 77
- Location: Kingsville–Bishop
- Length: 13.494 mi (21.716 km)
- Existed: June 21, 1990–present

Business U.S. Highway 77-V (Bus. US 77-V) is a 13-mile (21 km) business loop that runs through Kingsville and Bishop. The business loop's southern terminus begins at an intersection with US 77 and travels northwest and then turns to the north, eventually entering Kingsville. The route then turns to the northeast and then turns left onto S 14th Street, heading north. Bus. US 77-V then turns back to the northeast after leaving Kingsville and eventually enters Bishop after a few miles. After passing through Bishop, Bus. US 77-V then turns to the east and hits its northern terminus at another intersection with US 77.

=== Riviera business loop ===
Business U.S. Highway 77
- Location: Riviera
- Length: 2.7 mi (4.3 km)

=== Sebastian–Lyford–Raymondville business loop ===
Business U.S. Highway 77
- Location: Sebastian–Raymondville
- Length: 14.397 mi (23.170 km)
- Existed: June 21, 1990–present

Business U.S. Highway 77-W (Bus. US 77-W) is a 14.2-mile (22.9 km) business loop that runs through Sebastian, Lyford, and Raymondville. The business loop begins at its southern terminus at an intersection with I-69E and US 77, turning to the northwest before turning north, running parallel with I-69E and US 77. Bus. US 77-W reaches Sebastian, passing through town before exiting, eventually reaching South Lyford and Lyford. Bus. US 77-W continues northward out of town before turning slightly to the northeast and entering Raymondville. The business loop continues northeastward before reaching an intersection with Willacy County Road 3690W. Bus. 77-W then turns to the right and immediately ends at its northern terminus at another intersection with I-69E and US 77.

=== San Benito–Harlingen–Combes business loop ===
Business U.S. Highway 77
- Location: San Benito–Combes
- Length: 14.956 mi (24.069 km)
- Existed: June 21, 1990–present

Business U.S. Highway 77-X (Bus. US 77-X) is a 15.9-mile (25.6 km) business loop that runs through San Benito, Harlingen, and Combes. The business loop begins at an interchange with I-69E and US 77, heading northwest through San Benito before entering Harlingen. After briefly turning to the north while passing through Harlingen, Bus. US 77-X turns back to the northwest where it intersects with I-69E and US 77 again. The business loop then exits Harlingen and continues northwest into Combes. After leaving Combes, the business loop reaches its northern terminus at another intersection with I-69E and US 77.

=== Brownsville business loop ===
Business U.S. Highway 77
- Location: Brownsville
- Length: 3.955 mi (6.365 km)
- Existed: June 21, 1990–present

Business U.S. Highway 77-Z (Bus. US 77-Z) is a 3.8-mile (6.1 km) business loop in Brownsville. The loop's southern terminus begins at an intersection of SH 4 and takes a northwestern direction before turning to the north. The business loop's northern terminus is at an intersection of FM 802, close to an intersection of I-69E, US 77, and US 83.

=== Auxiliary route ===
Alternate U.S. Highway 77
- Location: Refugio–Hallettsville
- Length: 91.0 mi (146.5 km)
- Existed: October 29, 1953–present

Alternate US Highway 77 (Alt. US 77) is a north-south auxiliary route of US 77, located entirely within the state of Texas. The alternate route was commissioned in 1953 when the mainline US 77 was rerouted through southeast Texas. Alt. US 77 begins at an intersection in Refugio with the mainline US 77, sharing a concurrency with US 183. The two highways share a concurrency through Goliad and Cuero. SH 239 shares a short overlap with Alt. US 77 and US 183 through Goliad, and US 87 shares a concurrency with the two highways in Cuero. Alt. US 77 splits away from US 183, heading northeast through Yoakum, which also has a business loop of the highway. After passing through Yoakum, Alt. US 77 intersects and merges with Alt. US 90 just west of Hallettsville, where the two highways intersect with mainline US 77.

=== Yoakum auxiliary business loop ===
Business Alternate U.S. Highway 77-Q
- Location: Yoakum
- Length: 2.909 mi (4.682 km)
- Existed: June 21, 1990–present

Alt. US 77 has one business loop in Yoakum. Officially designated by TxDOT as Business US 77-Q, it is signed with two auxiliary banners as Business Alternate US 77 (Bus. Alt. US 77). The route was originally established as Loop 51 in 1939 and was redesignated in 1991. The loop begins at Alt. US 77 south of Yoakum, then travels northwest into the city along Huck Street. It then turns north along Irvine Street, and has a brief concurrency with SH 111. It then turns northwest along Gonzales Street to an intersection with mainline Alt. US 77.

== Notes ==
U.S. Route 77
Previous state: Terminus	Texas	Next state: Oklahoma
