= List of Farm to Market Roads in Texas (3200–3299) =

- Texas Farm to Market Road and Ranch to Market Road markers

Highway names
- Interstates: Interstate Highway X (IH-X, I-X)
- US Highways: U.S. Highway X (US X)
- State: State Highway X (SH X)
- Loops: Loop X
- Spurs: Spur X
- Recreational: Recreational Road X (RE X)
- Farm or Ranch to Market Roads: Farm to Market Road X (FM X); Ranch to Market Road X (RM X)
- Park Roads: Park Road X (PR X)

System links
- Highways in Texas; Interstate; US; State; Former; Toll; Loops; Spurs; FM/RM; Park; Rec

Farm to Market Roads in Texas are owned and maintained by the Texas Department of Transportation (TxDOT).

== FM 3200 ==
Farm to Market Road 3200
- Location: Comanche County
- Length: 4.421 mi (7.115 km)
- Existed: 1970–present

== FM 3201 ==
Farm to Market Road 3201
- Location: Stephens County
- Length: 2.932 mi (4.719 km)
- Existed: 1970–present

== FM 3202 ==
Farm to Market Road 3202
- Location: Knox County
- Length: 3.355 mi (5.399 km)
- Existed: 1970–present

== FM 3203 ==
Farm to Market Road 3203
- Location: Motley County
- Length: 3.62 mi (5.83 km)
- Existed: 1970–present

== FM 3204 ==
Farm to Market Road 3204
- Location: Henderson County
- Length: 4.94 mi (7.95 km)
- Existed: January 31, 1972–present

=== FM 3204 (1970) ===
Farm to Market Road 3204
- Location: Armstrong County
- Existed: May 7, 1970–November 30, 1971

A previous route numbered FM 3204 was designated on May 7, 1970, from the Carson County line south 1.1 miles (1.8 km) to US 287. FM 3204 was cancelled on November 30, 1971, and became a portion of FM 2373.

== FM 3205 ==
Farm to Market Road 3205
- Location: Fisher County
- Length: 4.056 mi (6.527 km)
- Existed: 1970–present

== FM 3206 ==
Farm to Market Road 3206
- Location: Montague County
- Length: 6.295 mi (10.131 km)
- Existed: 1971–present

== FM 3207 ==
Farm to Market Road 3207
- Location: Wilbarger County
- Length: 4.982 mi (8.018 km)
- Existed: 1971–present

== FM 3208 ==
Farm to Market Road 3208
- Location: Erath County
- Length: 1.851 mi (2.979 km)
- Existed: 1971–present

== FM 3209 ==
Farm to Market Road 3209
- Location: Jack County
- Length: 1.994 mi (3.209 km)
- Existed: 1971–present

== FM 3210 ==
Farm to Market Road 3210
- Location: Hood County
- Length: 3.675 mi (5.914 km)
- Existed: 1971–present

== FM 3211 ==
Farm to Market Road 3211
- Location: Hunt County
- Length: 5.151 mi (8.290 km)
- Existed: May 25, 1976–present

Farm to Market Road 3211 (FM 3211) is located in Hunt County. It runs from Spur 1570 to FM 36.

FM 3211 was designated on May 25, 1976, from SH 66 westward 3.5 miles (5.6 km). On September 29, 1977, the road was extended west 1.2 miles (1.9 km) to FM 36. In December 2018, when Spur 1570 was built, the section from Spur 1570 east was cancelled, with one part being obliterated, truncating the eastern terminus to Spur 1570.

=== FM 3211 (1971) ===
Farm to Market Road 3211
- Location: Johnson County
- Existed: November 5, 1971–January 2, 1976

A previous route numbered FM 3211 was designated on November 5, 1971, from I-35W in Alvarado west 3.0 miles (4.8 km) miles to a road intersection at Lake Alvarado. FM 3211 was cancelled on January 2, 1976, and became a portion of FM 3136.

== FM 3212 ==
Farm to Market Road 3212
- Location: Dallam County
- Length: 7.507 mi (12.081 km)
- Existed: 1971–present

== FM 3213 ==
Farm to Market Road 3213
- Location: Dallam County
- Length: 3.323 mi (5.348 km)
- Existed: 1971–present

== FM 3214 ==
Farm to Market Road 3214
- Location: Hansford County
- Length: 13.308 mi (21.417 km)
- Existed: 1971–present

== FM 3215 ==
Farm to Market Road 3215
- Location: Castro County
- Length: 2.17 mi (3.49 km)
- Existed: 1971–present

== FM 3216 ==
Farm to Market Road 3216
- Location: Lamb County
- Length: 5.55 mi (8.93 km)
- Existed: 1971–present

== FM 3217 ==
Farm to Market Road 3217
- Location: Callahan County
- Length: 3.676 mi (5.916 km)
- Existed: 1971–present

== FM 3218 ==
Farm to Market Road 3218
- Location: Hunt County
- Length: 3.093 mi (4.978 km)
- Existed: 1972–present

=== FM 3218 (1971) ===
Farm to Market Road 3218
- Location: Haskell County
- Existed: November 5, 1971–April 1972

The original FM 3218 was designated on November 5, 1971, to run from US 277 north of Haskell, northeast 2.1 miles (3.4 km). This road was cancelled 150 days after designation.

== FM 3219 ==
Farm to Market Road 3219
- Location: Bell County
- Length: 1.43 mi (2.30 km)
- Existed: 1971–present

Farm to Market Road 3219 (FM 3219) is located in Bell County.

FM 3219 begins at an intersection with Bus. US 190 in Harker Heights, with the road continuing south as Lookout Ridge Boulevard. The highway crosses over the South Nolan Creek before leaving Harker Heights. FM 3219 travels in a northeast direction before ending at an intersection with FM 439 just east of Killeen.

FM 3219 was designated on November 5, 1971, running northward from US 190 (current Bus. US 190) to FM 439. On June 27, 1995, the route was redesignated Urban Road 3219 (UR 3219). The designation reverted to FM 3219 with the elimination of the Urban Road system on November 15, 2018.

== FM 3220 ==
Farm to Market Road 3220
- Location: Bosque County
- Length: 0.53 mi (850 m)
- Existed: 1971–present

== FM 3221 ==
Farm to Market Road 3221
- Location: Bosque County
- Length: 0.719 mi (1,157 m)
- Existed: 1971–present

== FM 3222 ==
Farm to Market Road 3222
- Location: McLennan County
- Length: 2.31 mi (3.72 km)
- Existed: 1971–present

== FM 3223 ==
Farm to Market Road 3223
- Location: McLennan County
- Length: 2.199 mi (3.539 km)
- Existed: 1971–present

Farm to Market Road 3223 (FM 3223) is located in Waco. The highway is known locally as Imperial Drive.

FM 3223 begins at an intersection with FM 1695 (Hewitt Drive) and travels through an industrialized area on the city's south side. The highway ends at an intersection with the southbound frontage road of SH 6.

FM 3223 was designated on November 5, 1971, along the current route. The route was redesignated Urban Road 3223 (UR 3223) in 1995. The designation reverted to FM 3223 with the elimination of the Urban Road system on November 15, 2018.

== FM 3224 ==
Farm to Market Road 3224
- Location: Anderson County
- Length: 2.649 mi (4.263 km)
- Existed: 1971–present

== FM 3225 ==
Farm to Market Road 3225
- Location: Henderson County
- Length: 2.298 mi (3.698 km)
- Existed: 1971–present

== FM 3226 ==
Farm to Market Road 3226
- Location: Smith County
- Length: 2.684 mi (4.319 km)
- Existed: 1971–present

Farm to Market Road 3226 is a 2.684-mile (4.319 km) state road in Smith County, that connects Texas State Highway 64 (southeast of New Chapel Hill) with Farm to Market Road 850 (northeast of New Chapel Hill).

== FM 3227 ==
Farm to Market Road 3227
- Location: Van Zandt County
- Length: 7.398 mi (11.906 km)
- Existed: 1971–present

== FM 3228 ==
Farm to Market Road 3228
- Location: Nacogdoches County
- Length: 1.968 mi (3.167 km)
- Existed: 1971–present

== FM 3229 ==
Farm to Market Road 3229
- Location: Sabine and San Augustine counties
- Length: 5.035 mi (8.103 km)
- Existed: 1971–present

== FM 3230 ==
Farm to Market Road 3230
- Location: San Augustine County
- Length: 6.874 mi (11.063 km)
- Existed: 1971–present

== FM 3231 ==
Farm to Market Road 3231
- Location: Panola and Rusk counties
- Length: 9.704 mi (15.617 km)
- Existed: December 14, 1977–present

=== FM 3231 (1971) ===
Farm to Market Road 3231
- Location: Shelby County
- Existed: November 5, 1971–November 8, 1977

FM 3231 was first designated on November 5, 1971, running from FM 138 at Arcadia southward at a distance of 1.7 miles (2.7 km). The highway was cancelled on November 8, 1977, with the highway being combined with FM 1645.

== RM 3232 ==
Ranch to Market Road 3232
- Location: Blanco County
- Length: 6.396 mi (10.293 km)
- Existed: 1971–present

== FM 3233 ==
Farm to Market Road 3233
- Location: Fayette County
- Length: 2.72 mi (4.38 km)
- Existed: 1971–present

== FM 3234 ==
Farm to Market Road 3234
- Location: Gonzales County
- Length: 3.583 mi (5.766 km)
- Existed: 1971–present

== RM 3235 ==
Ranch to Market Road 3235
- Location: Real County
- Length: 5.439 mi (8.753 km)
- Existed: May 7, 1974–present

=== FM 3235 (1971–1973) ===
Farm to Market Road 3235
- Location: Atascosa County
- Existed: November 5, 1971–September 20, 1973

FM 3235 was designated on November 5, 1971, from FM 1333, 4 miles (6.4 km) north of Charlotte, to a point 3.2 miles (5.1 km) northeast. On September 20, 1973, FM 3235 was cancelled and became a portion of FM 2146.

== FM 3236 ==
Farm to Market Road 3236
- Location: Hopkins County
- Length: 7.009 mi (11.280 km)
- Existed: November 3, 1972–present

=== RM 3236 (1971–1972) ===
Ranch to Market Road 3236
- Location: Burnet County
- Existed: November 5, 1971–August 29, 1972

RM 3236 was designated on November 5, 1971, from RM 690 near Buchanan Dam to a point 2.5 miles (4.0 km) northeast. On August 29, 1972, RM 3236 was cancelled and transferred to RM 690.

== RM 3237 ==
Ranch to Market Road 3237
- Location: Hays County
- Length: 9.175 mi (14.766 km)
- Existed: 1971–present

== RM 3238 ==
Ranch to Market Road 3238
- Location: Travis County
- Length: 6.847 mi (11.019 km)
- Existed: November 5, 1971–present

Ranch to Market Road 3238 (RM 3238) is a 6.847-mile (11.019 km) roadway in Travis County. It is known locally as Hamilton Pool Road. Hamilton Pool Road straddles Hamilton Creek, near the Hays County line. State maintenance and the RM 3238 designation begin at a point immediately east of Peerman Road and approximately 0.2 mi (0.32 km) west of the intersection with Ranch to Market Road 12 (north of the unincorporated community of Fitzhugh. The route travels east and northeast before ending at a junction with Texas State Highway 71 in Bee Cave.

RM 3238 was designated on November 5, 1971; its eastern terminus has always been SH 71. It originally went west 5.5 miles (8.9 km) from SH 71. The route was extended to the west 1.5 miles (2.4 km) on September 29, 1977, and again on April 30, 1987, to include the intersection with RM 12.

Junction list

The entire route is in Travis County.

Location	mi	km	Destinations	Notes
	0.0	0.0	Hamilton Pool Road west – Round Mountain	Continuation west from western terminus
	0.0	0.0	Peerman Lane south	Western terminus; T intersection
	0.2	0.32	RM 12 south – Dripping Springs	T intersection
Bee Cave	6.8	10.9	SH 71 east – Austin SH 71 west – US 281, Llano	Eastern terminus
Bee Cave	6.8	10.9	Bee Cave Parkway east – RM 620	Continuation east from eastern terminus
1.000 mi = 1.609 km; 1.000 km = 0.621 mi

== FM 3239 ==
Farm to Market Road 3239
- Location: San Patricio County
- Length: 1.007 mi (1.621 km)
- Existed: 1971–present

== FM 3240 ==
Farm to Market Road 3240
- Location: Bandera County
- Length: 7.205 mi (11.595 km)
- Existed: 1971–present

Farm to Market Road 3240 (FM 3240) is located in Bandera County in the Texas Hill Country.

FM 3240 begins at an intersection with RM 2828 northwest of Peaceful Valley Road. The highway travels in a generally southeast direction through hilly terrain and turns more in a southward direction at Sparrow Hawk Lane. FM 3240 turns to the south at Timber Lane before turning back at Dallas Street. The highway passes near a subdivision before ending at an intersection with SH 173 just north of Bandera; the road continues east past SH 173 as Bandera Boulevard.

FM 3240 was designated on November 5, 1971, from FM 689 (now SH 173) to a point 2.5 miles (4.0 km) to the northwest. It was cancelled 90 days later because Bandera County did not accept the minute order. On July 31, 1972, FM 3240 was reinstated, as the county agreed after adding an extension to another FM road to the minute order. On September 5, 1973, the highway was extended further northwest to RM 2828, bringing FM 3240 to its current route.

== FM 3241 ==
Farm to Market Road 3241
- Location: Jim Wells County
- Existed: November 5, 1971–March 30, 1987

Farm to Market Road 3241 (FM 3241) was located in Jim Wells County. No highway currently uses the FM 3241 designation.

The highway was designated on November 5, 1971, from a county road east 2.2 miles (3.5 km) to SH 359. The highway was cancelled on March 30, 1987; 1.9 miles were transferred to FM 3376 and the remainder was removed altogether.

== FM 3242 ==
Farm to Market Road 3242
- Location: Milam County
- Length: 7.384 mi (11.883 km)
- Existed: 1971–present

== FM 3243 ==
Farm to Market Road 3243
- Location: Navarro County
- Length: 5.102 mi (8.211 km)
- Existed: 1971–present

== FM 3244 ==
Farm to Market Road 3244
- Location: Bowie County
- Length: 0.925 mi (1,489 m)
- Existed: 1971–present

== FM 3245 ==
Farm to Market Road 3245
- Location: Upshur County
- Length: 1.994 mi (3.209 km)
- Existed: 1971–present

== FM 3246 ==
Farm to Market Road 3246
- Location: Chambers County
- Length: 0.41 mi (660 m)
- Existed: 1971–present

== FM 3247 ==
Farm to Market Road 3247
- Location: Orange County
- Length: 8.129 mi (13.082 km)
- Existed: 1971–present

== FM 3248 ==
Farm to Market Road 3248
- Location: Cameron County
- Length: 7.871 mi (12.667 km)
- Existed: 1971–present

Farm to Market Road 3248 (FM 3248) runs around the western and northern portions of Brownsville. FM 3248 begins at an intersection with US 281 in Brownsville, heading north on West Alton Gloor Boulevard, a five-lane road with a center left-turn lane. The road heads through residential neighborhoods before becoming a two-lane road and running between woodland within the Lower Rio Grande Valley National Wildlife Refuge to the west and businesses to the east. The highway turns east-northeast and runs through more residential and commercial areas, crossing a Union Pacific railroad line. FM 3248 heads into commercial areas as a five-lane road with a center left-turn lane and comes to an interchange with I-69E/US 77/US 83. Past this interchange, the road becomes East Alton Gloor Boulevard and continues into areas of residential neighborhoods and businesses. The highway intersects FM 1847 and becomes two-lane Dr. Hugh Emerson Boulevard, heading into unincorporated areas and passing through farmland with some homes. FM 3248 crosses back into Brownsville and comes to its eastern terminus at FM 511.

FM 3248 was designated on November 5, 1971, from what is now I-69E/US 77/US 83 southwestward to US 281. On September 5, 1973, it was extended eastward to its intersection with FM 1847, and again extended eastward on September 26, 1979, to its intersection with FM 511. The portion west of FM 1847 was redesignated Urban Road 3248 (UR 3248) on June 27, 1995. The designation of this section reverted to FM 3248 with the elimination of the Urban Road system on November 15, 2018.

Junction list

The entire route is in Brownsville, Cameron County.

mi	km	Destinations	Notes
0.0	0.0	US 281 (Military Highway)	
3.2	5.1	I-69E / US 77 / US 83	I-69E exit 6
5.4	8.7	FM 1847 (Paredes Line Road)	
7.8	12.6	FM 511 (Frontage Road) to Future I-169 / SH 550 Toll	
1.000 mi = 1.609 km; 1.000 km = 0.621 mi

== FM 3249 ==
Farm to Market Road 3249
- Location: Duval County
- Length: 6.477 mi (10.424 km)
- Existed: 1971–present

== FM 3250 ==
Farm to Market Road 3250
- Location: Hidalgo County
- Length: 3.859 mi (6.210 km)
- Existed: 1971–present

== FM 3251 ==
Farm to Market Road 3251
- Location: Harrison County
- Length: 5.1 mi (8.2 km)
- Existed: May 15, 1981–present

=== FM 3251 (1971) ===
Farm to Market Road 3251
- Location: Willacy, Cameron, and Hidalgo counties
- Existed: November 5, 1971–September 24, 1973

The first use of the FM 3251 designation was in Willacy, Cameron, and Hidalgo counties, from FM 491 south 2.8 miles (4.5 km) to FM 2629. FM 3251 was cancelled on September 24, 1973, and became a portion of FM 1425.

=== FM 3251 (1974) ===
Farm to Market Road 3251
- Location: McLennan County
- Existed: May 7, 1974–August 18, 1980

The next use of the FM 3251 designation was in McLennan County, from I-35 north of Lorena to a point 4.4 miles (7.1 km). FM 3251 was cancelled on August 18, 1980, and became a portion of FM 2837.

== FM 3252 ==
Farm to Market Road 3252
- Location: Dimmit County
- Length: 3.729 mi (6.001 km)
- Existed: 1971–present

== FM 3253 ==
Farm to Market Road 3253
- Location: Stephens County
- Length: 4.848 mi (7.802 km)
- Existed: November 5, 1971 (Note: FM 3253 was designated as RM 3253 from 1971 to 1992.)–present

== FM 3254 ==
Farm to Market Road 3254
- Location: Brown County
- Length: 1.972 mi (3.174 km)
- Existed: 1971–present

== FM 3255 ==
Farm to Market Road 3255
- Location: El Paso County
- Length: 5.481 mi (8.821 km)
- Existed: 1971–present

Farm to Market Road 3255 (FM 3255) is located in the city of El Paso. The highway runs parallel to Franklin Mountains State Park for its entire length. It is known locally as Martin Luther King Jr. Boulevard.

FM 3255 begins at a junction with US 54 near a retail center and runs near a large subdivision before the route becomes more rural. The highway runs near the Franklin Mountains before ending at the New Mexico state line.

FM 3255 was designated on November 5, 1971, along the current route. The section of highway between US 54 and FM 2529 was redesignated Urban Road 3255 (UR 3255) on June 27, 1995. The designation reverted to FM 3255 with the elimination of the Urban Road system on November 15, 2018.

Junction list

The entire route is in El Paso, El Paso County.

mi	km	Destinations	Notes
0.0	0.0	US 54 (Gateway Boulevard)	US 54 exit 31
4.4	7.1	FM 2529 south (Stan Roberts Sr. Avenue)	
		Spur 320 (Borderland Expressway)	
5.5	8.9	NM 213 – Chaparral	Continuation into New Mexico
1.000 mi = 1.609 km; 1.000 km = 0.621 mi

== FM 3256 ==
Farm to Market Road 3256
- Location: Cottle County
- Length: 3.255 mi (5.238 km)
- Existed: 1971–present

== FM 3257 ==
Farm to Market Road 3257
- Location: Donley County
- Length: 3.173 mi (5.106 km)
- Existed: 1971–present

== FM 3258 ==
Farm to Market Road 3258
- Location: Angelina County
- Length: 2.322 mi (3.737 km)
- Existed: 1971–present

== FM 3259 ==
Farm to Market Road 3259
- Location: Wise County
- Length: 3.447 mi (5.547 km)
- Existed: 1972–present

== RM 3260 ==
Ranch to Market Road 3260
- Location: Lipscomb County
- Length: 9.06 mi (14.58 km)
- Existed: 1972–present

== FM 3261 ==
Farm to Market Road 3261
- Location: Hockley and Terry counties
- Length: 14.138 mi (Note: The certified length given is shorter than the actual mileage, as the TxDOT description of FM 3261 considers it to be discontinuous at rather than concurrent with FM 41 and FM 1585.) (22.753 km)
- Existed: 1972–present

Farm to Market Road 3261 (FM 3261) is located in the South Plains region, traveling through Terry and Hockley counties.

FM 3261 begins at an intersection with US 385 between Brownfield and Levelland in rural Terry County. The highway starts out traveling in a northeast direction before turning north at a county road. FM 3261 enters into Hockley County and has an overlap with FM 41 then has an overlap with FM 1585. The highway travels through mostly rural areas, with the northern section seeing some development near the town of Levelland. FM 3261 ends at an intersection with SH 114 between Levelland and Opdyke West. Despite not running inside the city limits, FM 3261 near Levelland is locally known as H. Moreland Road.

FM 3261 was designated on November 3, 1972, running from FM 1585 southward to US 385 at a distance of 8.0 miles (12.9 km). The highway was extended 6.4 miles (10.3 km) northward to SH 116 (now SH 114) on November 25, 1975.

Junction list

County	Location	mi	km	Destinations	Notes
Terry		0.0	0.0	US 385 – Brownfield, Levelland	
Hockley		2.1	3.4	FM 41 west – Sundown	South end of FM 41 overlap
Hockley		3.0	4.8	FM 41 east – Ropesville	North end of FM 41 overlap
Hockley		8.6	13.8	FM 1585 east	South end of FM 1585 overlap
Hockley		10.0	16.1	FM 1585 west	North end of FM 1585 overlap
Hockley		16.4	26.4	SH 114 – Levelland, Lubbock	
1.000 mi = 1.609 km; 1.000 km = 0.621 mi: Concurrency terminus

== FM 3262 ==
Farm to Market Road 3262
- Location: Terry County
- Length: 2.16 mi (3.48 km)
- Existed: 1972–present

== FM 3263 ==
Farm to Market Road 3263
- Location: Martin County
- Length: 5.967 mi (9.603 km)
- Existed: 1972–present

== FM 3264 ==
Farm to Market Road 3264
- Location: Wise County
- Length: 1.972 mi (3.174 km)
- Existed: November 25, 1975–present

=== FM 3264 (1972) ===
Farm to Market Road 3264
- Location: Bell County
- Existed: November 3, 1972–August 18, 1975

A previous route numbered FM 3264 was designated on November 3, 1972, from US 190, 1.5 miles (2.4 km) west of FM 1670, southeast 3.1 miles (5.0 km) to FM 594 (now Loop 121). FM 3264 was cancelled on August 18, 1975, and removed from the highway system; funds released were used towards other FM road projects in the county.

== FM 3265 ==
Farm to Market Road 3265
- Location: Callahan and Eastland counties
- Length: 5.577 mi (8.975 km)
- Existed: 1972–present

== FM 3266 ==
Farm to Market Road 3266
- Location: Anderson County
- Length: 1.714 mi (2.758 km)
- Existed: 1974–present

=== FM 3266 (1972) ===
Farm to Market Road 3266
- Location: Hamilton County
- Existed: November 3, 1972–February 1973

The original FM 3266 was designated on November 3, 1972, to run from FM 218 in Pottsville, northeast 4.8 miles (7.7 km) to FM 2486. This road was cancelled 90 days after designation.

== FM 3267 ==
Farm to Market Road 3267
- Location: Hill County
- Length: 3.468 mi (5.581 km)
- Existed: 1972–present

== FM 3268 ==
Farm to Market Road 3268
- Location: McLennan County
- Length: 2.308 mi (3.714 km)
- Existed: 1972–present

== FM 3269 ==
Farm to Market Road 3269
- Location: Bailey County
- Length: 3.042 mi (4.896 km)
- Existed: November 25, 1975–present

=== FM 3269 (1972) ===
Farm to Market Road 3269
- Location: Cherokee County
- Existed: November 3, 1972–May 7, 1974

A previous route numbered FM 3269 was designated on November 3, 1972, from FM 1911 in Forest to a point 2.2 miles (3.5 km) southeast. FM 3269 was cancelled on May 7, 1974, and removed from the highway system because the county could not acquire right-of-way for the route; FM 3288 was created instead.

== FM 3270 ==
Farm to Market Road 3270
- Location: Smith County
- Length: 0.65 mi (1,050 m)
- Existed: 1972–present

== FM 3271 ==
Farm to Market Road 3271
- Location: Smith County
- Length: 2.353 mi (3.787 km)
- Existed: 1972–present

== FM 3272 ==
Farm to Market Road 3272
- Location: Gregg County
- Length: 2.861 mi (4.604 km)
- Existed: 1972–present

Farm to Market Road 3272 (FM 3272), known locally as White Oak Road, runs from US 80 north to FM 2275 in White Oak.

FM 3272 was designated on November 3, 1972, from US 80 north 1.4 miles (2.3 km). On October 21, 1981, the designation was extended north to FM 2275. On June 27, 1995, the route was redesignated Urban Road 3272 (UR 3272). The designation reverted to FM 3272 with the elimination of the Urban Road system on November 15, 2018.

== RM 3273 ==
Ranch to Market Road 3273
- Location: Henderson County
- Length: 1.861 mi (2.995 km)
- Existed: 1972–present

== FM 3274 ==
Farm to Market Road 3274
- Location: Rains County
- Length: 5.118 mi (8.237 km)
- Existed: November 25, 1975–present

=== FM 3274 (1972) ===
Farm to Market Road 3274
- Location: Wood County
- Existed: November 3, 1972–June 7, 1974

A previous route numbered FM 3274 was designated on November 3, 1972, from FM 2088, 4.4 miles (7.1 km) east of FM 312, southeast 2.0 miles (3.2 km) to a road intersection. FM 3274 was cancelled on June 7, 1974, and became a portion of FM 2910 (now FM 2869).

== FM 3275 ==
Farm to Market Road 3275
- Location: Houston County
- Length: 1.669 mi (2.686 km)
- Existed: 1972–present

== FM 3276 ==
Farm to Market Road 3276
- Location: Nacogoches County
- Length: 1.363 mi (2.194 km)
- Existed: 1972–present

== FM 3277 ==
Farm to Market Road 3277
- Location: Polk County
- Length: 5.529 mi (8.898 km)
- Existed: 1972–present

== FM 3278 ==
Farm to Market Road 3278
- Location: Polk and San Jacinto counties
- Length: 4.46 mi (7.18 km)
- Existed: 1972–present

== FM 3279 ==
Farm to Market Road 3279
- Location: San Augustine County
- Length: 1.499 mi (2.412 km)
- Existed: 1972–present

== FM 3280 ==
Farm to Market Road 3280
- Location: Jackson, Calhoun, and Matagorda counties
- Length: 5.3 mi (8.5 km)
- Existed: 1972–present

== FM 3281 ==
Farm to Market Road 3281
- Location: Red River County
- Length: 4.48 mi (7.21 km)
- Existed: October 21, 1981–present

=== FM 3281 (1972) ===
Farm to Market Road 3281
- Location: Fayette County
- Existed: November 3, 1972–September 21, 1973

The first use of the FM 3281 designation was in Fayette County, from FM 954 northeast 3.5 miles (5.6 km) to the Austin County line, 0.5 miles (0.80 km) southwest of Shelby. FM 3281 was cancelled on September 21, 1973, and became a portion of FM 389.

=== FM 3281 (1974) ===
Farm to Market Road 3281
- Location: Van Zandt County
- Existed: May 7, 1974–February 27, 1979

The next use of the FM 3281 designation was in Van Zandt County, from US 80 southeast 1.1 miles (1.8 km) to FM 47, 1.1 miles (1.8 km) southwest of Wills Point. FM 3281 was cancelled on February 27, 1979, by request of county officials.

== FM 3282 ==
Farm to Market Road 3282
- Location: Gonzales County
- Length: 3.073 mi (4.946 km)
- Existed: 1972–present

== FM 3283 ==
Farm to Market Road 3283
- Location: Lavaca County
- Length: 3.979 mi (6.404 km)
- Existed: 1972–present

== FM 3284 ==
Farm to Market Road 3284
- Location: San Patricio County
- Length: 6.248 mi (10.055 km)
- Existed: 1972–present

== FM 3285 ==
Farm to Market Road 3285
- Location: Freestone County
- Length: 3.145 mi (5.061 km)
- Existed: 1972–present

== FM 3286 ==
Farm to Market Road 3286
- Location: Collin County
- Length: 3.916 mi (6.302 km)
- Existed: 1972–present

Farm to Market Road 3286 (FM 3286), also known as East Lucas Road, is located on the east side of Lucas in Collin County. The east end of FM 3286 is an intersection with FM 1378, between Southview Dr. and West Lucas Rd. The west end of FM 3286 is at an intersection between FM 546 and County Rd. 437.

== FM 3287 ==
Farm to Market Road 3287
- Location: Bowie County
- Length: 1.343 mi (2.161 km)
- Existed: 1972–present

== FM 3288 ==
Farm to Market Road 3288
- Location: Cherokee County
- Length: 2.955 mi (4.756 km)
- Existed: 1974–present

Farm to Market Road 3288 (FM 3288) is located in east-central Cherokee County.

FM 3288 begins at an intersection with FM 2274, heading east before turning to the south. It runs along the western shore of Lake Striker, turning into CR 4413 farther to the south.

FM 3288 was designated on May 7, 1974, along the current route.

=== FM 3288 (1972) ===
Farm to Market Road 3288
- Location: Titus County
- Existed: November 3, 1972–September 21, 1973

A previous route numbered FM 3288 was designated in Titus County on November 3, 1972, running 2.5 miles (4.0 km) from Hickory Hill to SH 11. This route was cancelled on September 21, 1973, and transferred to FM 1735.

== FM 3289 ==
Farm to Market Road 3289
- Location: Jefferson County
- Existed: November 3, 1972–January 30, 1990

Farm to Market Road 3289 (FM 3289) was designated on November 3, 1972, from US 69/US 96/US 287, 3.5 miles (5.6 km) northwest of FM 365, southwest 1.6 miles (2.6 km) to West Port Arthur Road (now Spur 93). On January 30, 1990, FM 3289 was cancelled as the proposed prison it was to serve was never built.

== FM 3290 ==
Farm to Market Road 3290
- Location: Tyler County
- Length: 0.469 mi (755 m)
- Existed: 1972–present

== FM 3291 ==
Farm to Market Road 3291
- Location: Uvalde County
- Length: 2.3 mi (3.7 km)
- Existed: 1972–present

== FM 3292 ==
Farm to Market Road 3292
- Location: Zavala County
- Length: 2.983 mi (4.801 km)
- Existed: 1972–present

== FM 3293 ==
Farm to Market Road 3293
- Location: McCulloch County
- Length: 2.196 mi (3.534 km)
- Existed: 1972–present

== FM 3294 ==
Farm to Market Road 3294
- Location: Dickens County
- Length: 3.935 mi (6.333 km)
- Existed: 1972–present

== FM 3295 ==
Farm to Market Road 3295
- Location: Hardeman County
- Length: 3.761 mi (6.053 km)
- Existed: 1972–present

== RM 3296 ==
Ranch to Market Road 3296
- Location: Hartley County
- Length: 9.39 mi (15.11 km)
- Existed: 1972–present

== FM 3297 ==
Farm to Market Road 3297
- Location: Fannin County
- Length: 2.666 mi (4.291 km)
- Existed: 1973–present

== FM 3298 ==
Farm to Market Road 3298
- Location: Lamar County
- Length: 6.104 mi (9.823 km)
- Existed: 1973–present

== FM 3299 ==
Farm to Market Road 3299
- Location: Rains County
- Length: 1.004 mi (1.616 km)
- Existed: 1973–present
