= Texas State Highway Loop 499 =

State highway in Texas

State Highway Loop 499
- Loop 499 highlighted in red

Route information
- Maintained by TxDOT
- Length: 7.868 mi (12.662 km)
- Existed: 1971–present

Major junctions
- CCW end: I-69E / US 77 / US 83
- CW end: I-69E / US 77

Location
- Country: United States
- State: Texas

Highway system
- Highways in Texas; Interstate; US; State; Former; Toll; Loops; Spurs; FM/RM; Park; Rec
← Loop 498	→ Loop 500

Loop 499 is a 7.868-mile-long (12.662 km) loop route around the city of Harlingen in the U.S. state of Texas. The loop extends around the northern, eastern, and southern sides, with Interstate 69E, U.S. Highway 77, and 83 completing the loop on the west side. This loop was proposed and temporarily designated in 1971 at the beginning of construction, with official designation in 1973. The loop is a significant thoroughfare around the city, as it is the main connection to Valley International Airport.

== Route description ==
Loop 499 begins on the north side of Harlingen at I-69E/US 77. It heads east from this junction to FM 507. The loop begins to curve to the south at this intersection as it passes to the southwest of Valley International Airport. Heading south through the east side of Harlingen, the loop intersects Spur 206 and FM 106 at Harrison Avenue. The highway curves towards the southwest after this intersection and continues to the southwest to a junction with Bus. US 77-X near Valley Baptist Memorial Hospital. The loop continues to the southwest ending at an interchange with I-69E/US 77/US 83.

== History ==
Loop 499 was given a temporary designation on April 29, 1971 until construction began on the highway. On April 31, 1973, it was officially added to the State Highway System as a route from US 77 to Loop 448. The route was extended to the southwest to US 83 over a section of Farm to Market Road 801 on May 21, 1979.

== Junction list ==
The entire route is in Harlingen, Cameron County.

mi	km	Destinations	Notes
0.000	0.000	I-69E / US 77 / US 83	I-69E exit 23A
1.040	1.674	Bus. US 77 (Sunshine Strip)	
3.300	5.311	Spur 206 / FM 106 (Harrison Avenue)	
4.500	7.242	FM 507 (25th Street)	
7.700	12.392	Bus. US 77 (Sunshine Strip)	
7.868	12.662	I-69E / US 77	I-69E exit 29A
1.000 mi = 1.609 km; 1.000 km = 0.621 mi
