= Interstate 169 (Texas) =

Auxiliary Interstate Highway in Texas

Interstate 169
- I-169 and SH 550 corridor highlighted in red

Route information
- Auxiliary route of I-69
- Maintained by TxDOT
- Length: 9.74 mi (15.68 km)
- Existed: December 17, 2015–present
- History: First segment opened in 2008 as SH 550
- NHS: Entire route

Major junctions
- South end: Port of Brownsville
- SH 48 near Brownsville
- North end: I-69E / US 77 / US 83 in Olmito

Location
- Country: United States
- State: Texas
- Counties: Cameron

Highway system
- Interstate Highway System; Main; Auxiliary; Suffixed; Business; Future; Highways in Texas; Interstate; US; State; Former; Toll; Loops; Spurs; FM/RM; Park; Rec
← SH 168	→ SH 169
← SH 495	SH 550 Toll	→ I-610

Interstate 169 (I-169 (Note: Some sources use "IH-169", as "IH" is an abbreviation used by the Texas Department of Transportation for Interstate Highways.)) is an auxiliary route of I-69E in Texas that currently runs from I-69E in Brownsville southeast concurrently with State Highway 550 (SH 550), a toll road under construction that connects to the Port of Brownsville for 1.5 miles (2.4 km). When SH 550 is complete, it will be a limited-access toll route around the northern and eastern edges of Brownsville and signed as I-169, partly replacing and expanding Farm to Market Road 511 (FM 511). Its purpose is to provide an interstate connection to the Port of Brownsville.

The highway is currently maintained by the Cameron County Regional Mobility Authority.

== Route description ==
I-169/SH 550 acts as a connector between I-69E/U.S. Highway 77 (US 77)/US 83 and the Port of Brownsville. The highway was constructed on the same routing as FM 511 from its connection with I-69E and US 77/US 83 southeastward to FM 3248. Only the stretch between the I-69E/US 77/US 83 interchange and Old Alice Road, however, is currently signed as I-169, and SH 550 is currently also incomplete, running along incomplete freeway segments and frontage roads.

Separated travel lanes, intended to be the frontage roads, were the first stage of construction from I-69E and US 77/US 83 to FM 3248. Flyover bridges have been constructed at FM 1847 and at two rail crossings. The second stage of construction built a new divided limited-access highway, which splits from FM 511 at FM 3248 and travels southeast to a new entry point for the Port of Brownsville, and a new crossover bridge at Old Port Isabel Road. The third stage that will complete the mainlanes on the stage-one portion and construct exit ramps directly to and from I-69E and US 77/US 83 at Olmito, began in March 2013. The route is a toll route, but the second and third stages of the route are being funded with $36 million (equivalent to $51 million in 2024) of funding from the American Recovery and Reinvestment Act of 2009. According to local authorities in Cameron County, upon full completion, the route will be signed as I-169 as a spur route of I-69E.

== History ==
=== Previous SH 550 designation ===
State Highway 550
- Location: west of Fort Worth - Convair Assembly Plant
- Existed: May 22, 1947–September 26, 1960

SH 550 was previously designated on May 22, 1947, from US 80 west of Fort Worth, eastward via Fort Worth and Dallas to US 67 and US 80 east of Dallas. On July 29, 1953, SH 550 was extended to SH 183. On September 25, 1953, SH 550 was extended north to White Settlement Road. On May 26, 1954, SH 550 was extended west to US 80, and the old route to White Settlement Road became a connection. On April 27, 1955, the connection of SH 550 was extended north from White Settlement Road to the entrance of the Convair Assembly Plant. On October 30, 1958, the section east of the Dallas–Fort Worth Turnpike was canceled. This highway was transferred to I-20 (now I-30) and Spur 341 at the inception of the Interstate Highway System on September 26, 1960.

=== Current SH 550 designation ===
State Highway 550
- Location: Brownsville
- Existed: July 25, 2008–present

The first segment of SH 550 was opened and designated on July 25, 2008, despite the first stage of construction having been expected to be completed in 2010, with bidding for the final sections. The first phase of the route opened on March 10, 2011, with tolling for the bridge over FM 1847 beginning on May 11, 2011. Phase two, which created a new limited access highway from FM 3248 to a new entrance to the Port of Brownsville, was opened on June 1, 2013.

The I-169 designation along SH 550 between I-69E/US 77/US 83 and Old Alice Road was approved by the American Association of State Highway and Transportation Officials (AASHTO) on May 13, 2015. I-169 was officially designated along the portion of SH 550 between I-69E/US 77/US 83 and Old Alice Road on December 17, 2015. On February 16, 2016, I-169 signs were unveiled by state and local officials along the designated section. On March 26, 2020, the I-169 designation will extend east along SH 550 to the end of the freeway 0.4 miles (0.64 km) east of FM 1847.

== Future ==
I-169 will extend over the SH 550 freeway to the Port of Brownsville to make an interstate connection. Although the route has not been completed, construction for SH 550 to the Port of Brownsville is planned after environmental clearance is completed.

== Exit list ==
The entire route is in Brownsville, Cameron County. All exits are unnumbered.

mi	km	Destinations	Notes
0.00	0.00	Capt. Donald L. Foust Road	At-grade intersection; eastern terminus of SH 550; road continues east as Ray Windhaus Road
0.40	0.64	Old State Highway 48	At-grade intersection
0.60	0.97	Port of Brownsville gate entrance (eastbound traffic) exit (westbound traffic)	
0.66	1.06	SH 48	
1.42	2.29	FM 511 east	Eastern end of FM 511 frontage roads; southbound exit and northbound entrance
3.49	5.62	Port Isabel Road	Can be accessed via Dr. Hugh Emerson Road exits
6.54	10.53	FM 3248 (Dr. Hugh Emerson Road) FM 511 ends	Connected to FM 511 & Port Isabel Road exits; western end of FM 511 frontage roads; western terminus of FM 511
6.88	11.07	FM 1847	Temporary southern terminus of I-169
7.22	11.62	Old Alice Road	
9.74	15.68	I-69E north / US 77 north / US 83 north to I-2 west	I-69E exit 10B southbound; northern terminus of I-169; western terminus of SH 550
1.000 mi = 1.609 km; 1.000 km = 0.621 mi: Concurrency terminus; Incomplete access
