= Austwell-Tivoli Independent School District =

School district in Texas, United States

Location
- 207 Redfish St. Tivoli, Texas ESC Region 3 USA
- Coordinates: 28°27′26″N 96°53′27″W

District information
- Type: Independent school district
- Grades: Pre-K through 12
- Superintendent: Dr. Dolores Vela
- Schools: 2
- NCES District ID: 4809000

Students and staff
- Students: 139 (2023–2024)
- Teachers: 18.66 (on an FTE basis)
- Student–teacher ratio: 7.45:1
- Athletic conference: UIL Class 1A Basketball Division II
- District mascot: Redfish
- Colors: Red, White

Other information
- TEA District Accountability Rating for 2011-12: Recognized
- Website: Austwell-Tivoli ISD

Austwell-Tivoli Independent School District is a public school district based in the community of Tivoli, Texas (USA). In addition to Tivoli, the district also serves the city of Austwell and rural areas in eastern Refugio County.

== Finances ==
As of the 2010–2011 school year, the appraised valuation of property in the district was $444,677,000. The maintenance tax rate was $0.104 and the bond tax rate was $0.002 per $100 of appraised valuation.

== Academic achievement ==
In 2011, the school district was rated "recognized" by the Texas Education Agency. Thirty-five percent of districts in Texas in 2011 received the same rating. No state accountability ratings will be given to districts in 2012. A school district in Texas can receive one of four possible rankings from the Texas Education Agency: Exemplary (the highest possible ranking), Recognized, Academically Acceptable, and Academically Unacceptable (the lowest possible ranking).

Historical district TEA accountability ratings

- 2011: Recognized
- 2010: Exemplary
- 2009: Recognized
- 2008: Recognized
- 2007: Academically Acceptable
- 2006: Academically Acceptable
- 2005: Academically Acceptable
- 2004: Academically Acceptable

== Schools ==
- Austwell-Tivoli High School (Grades 7–12)
- Austwell-Tivoli Elementary School (Grades PK-6)

== Athletics ==
Austwell-Tivoli High School does not participate in football, but participates (for the 2014-2016 realignment cycle) in the following sports as a member of UIL Class A: basketball, cross country, tennis, track, volleyball (the latter as a girl's sport only) and golf.

== See also ==
- List of school districts in Texas
- List of high schools in Texas
