= Combes, Texas =

- Town
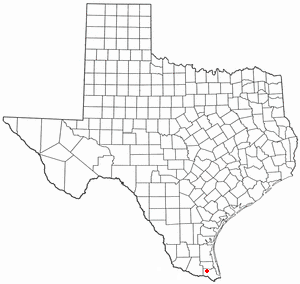
- Location of Combes, Texas

- Coordinates: 26°14′42″N 97°43′37″W
- Country: United States
- State: Texas
- County: Cameron

Area
  - Total: 3.24 sq mi (8.39 km^{2})
  - Land: 3.20 sq mi (8.29 km^{2})
  - Water: 0.039 sq mi (0.10 km^{2})
- Elevation: 39 ft (12 m)

Population (2020)
  - Total: 2,999
  - Density: 937/sq mi (362/km^{2})
- Time zone: UTC-6 (Central (CST))
  - Summer (DST): UTC-5 (CDT)
- ZIP code: 78535
- Area code: 956
- FIPS code: 48-16204
- GNIS feature ID: 1333181
- Website: cityofcombes.com

Combes is a town in northern Cameron County, Texas, United States. Its population was 2,999 at the 2020 census. It is part of the Brownsville–Harlingen–Raymondville and the Matamoros–Brownsville metropolitan areas.

== Geography ==
Combes is located in northwestern Cameron County at 26°14′42″N 97°43′37″W (26.245051, –97.727028). U.S. Route 77/Interstate 69E passes through the town, leading south 4 miles (6 km) to Harlingen and north 18 miles (29 km) to Raymondville. It is the last town U.S. 77 and Interstate 69E pass through in Cameron County going northward before entering Willacy County at Sebastian, approximately eight miles to the north. Combes is home to the eastern terminus of Texas State Highway 107, which leads west about six miles (10 km) west to Santa Rosa, and eventually to Edinburg, 29 miles ( 47 km ) to the west.

According to the United States Census Bureau, the town has a total area of 3.1 square miles (8.0 km^{2}), of which 3.0 square miles (7.8 km^{2}) are land and 0.04 square miles (0.1 km^{2}), or 1.80%, is covered by water.

== Demographics ==
Historical population
Census	Pop.	Note	%±
1960	605		—
1970	689		13.9%
1980	1,488		116.0%
1990	2,042		37.2%
2000	2,553		25.0%
2010	2,895		13.4%
2020	2,999		3.6%
U.S. Decennial Census; 1850–1900 1910; 1920 1930 1940; 1950 1960 1970; 1980 1990 2000; 2010

=== 2020 census ===
As of the 2020 census, Combes had a population of 2,999. The median age was 36.6 years. 26.7% of residents were under the age of 18 and 18.4% of residents were 65 years of age or older. For every 100 females there were 96.3 males, and for every 100 females age 18 and over there were 94.1 males age 18 and over.

87.9% of residents lived in urban areas, while 12.1% lived in rural areas.

There were 924 households and 683 families in Combes, of which 42.7% had children under the age of 18 living in them. Of all households, 52.5% were married-couple households, 14.5% were households with a male householder and no spouse or partner present, and 26.6% were households with a female householder and no spouse or partner present. About 15.6% of all households were made up of individuals and 7.7% had someone living alone who was 65 years of age or older.

There were 1,091 housing units, of which 15.3% were vacant. The homeowner vacancy rate was 1.6% and the rental vacancy rate was 13.9%.

Combes racial composition (NH = Non-Hispanic) (Note: Note: the US Census treats Hispanic/Latino as an ethnic category. This table excludes Latinos from the racial categories and assigns them to a separate category. Hispanics/Latinos can be of any race.)
Race	Number	Percentage
White (NH)	315	10.5%
Black or African American (NH)	12	0.4%
Asian (NH)	12	0.4%
Some Other Race (NH)	9	0.3%
Mixed/Multi-Racial (NH)	16	0.53%
Hispanic or Latino	2,635	87.86%
Total	2,999	

=== 2000 census ===
As of the census of 2000, 2,553 people, 775 households, and 626 were families residing in the town. The population density was 1,034.6 inhabitants per square mile (399.5/km^{2}). The 1,039 housing units averaged of 421.0 per square mile (162.4/km^{2}). The racial makeup of the town was 80.38% White, 0.35% African American, 1.29% Native American, 0.27% Asian, 0.31% Pacific Islander, 15.08% from other races, and 2.31% from two or more races. Hispanics or Latinos of any race were 76.30% of the population.

Of the 775 households, 41.8% had children under the age of 18 living with them, 65.8% were married couples living together, 11.5% had a female householder with no husband present, and 19.1% were not families. About 16.6% of all households were made up of individuals, and 9.3% had someone living alone who was 65 years of age or older. The average household size was 3.29, and the average family size was 3.76.

In the town, the age distribution was 33.8% under 18, 8.9% from 18 to 24, 25.6% from 25 to 44, 18.3% from 45 to 64, and 13.4% who were 65 or older. The median age was 31 years. For every 100 females, there were 94.9 males. For every 100 females age 18 and over, there were 91.1 males.

The median income for a household in the town was $28,605, and for a family was $31,190. Males had a median income of $22,332 versus $17,159 for females. The per capita income for the town was $9,546. About 18.9% of families and 22.1% of the population were below the poverty line, including 27.7% of those under age 18 and 14.4% of those age 65 or over.

== Education ==
Combes is served by the Harlingen Consolidated Independent School District.

In addition, South Texas Independent School District operates magnet schools that serve the community.

== Government and infrastructure ==
The United States Postal Service operates the Combes Post Office.
