= Texas State Highway 89 =

State highway in Texas

State Highway 89

Route information
- Maintained by TxDOT
- Length: 3.399 mi (5.470 km)
- Existed: 1988–present

Major junctions
- South end: US 181 / SH 188 east of Sinton
- Future I-69E / US 77 north of Sinton
- North end: US 181 north of Sinton

Location
- Country: United States
- State: Texas
- Counties: San Patricio

Highway system
- Highways in Texas; Interstate; US; State; Former; Toll; Loops; Spurs; FM/RM; Park; Rec
← SH 88	→ US 90

State Highway 89 (SH 89) is a state highway in San Patricio County in the U.S. state of Texas. The route serves as a bypass of Sinton to the northeast, connecting to U.S. Route 181 (US 181) at both ends.

== Route description ==
The southern terminus of SH 89 is an at-grade intersection with US 181 and SH 188; northbound US 181 turns to the west, cosigned with westbound SH 188, toward downtown Sinton, and eastbound SH 188 continues toward Aransas County. After crossing Chiltipin Creek, the route turns toward the northwest and has a partial interchange with US 77 Business before meeting the frontage roads of mainline US 77 (Future I-69E). Past this intersection, SH 89 curves toward the west before reaching its northern terminus at an exit for southbound US 181 traffic; the expressway continues past this point as US 181 northbound toward Beeville.

SH 89 is a hurricane evacuation route.

== History ==
SH 89 was designated on February 24, 1988, with construction beginning in May 2006. Construction was completed on the northbound lanes in September 2008, with the southbound lanes opening on January 5, 2009. The construction of the roadway included ten bridges and two new drainage structures near the north end.

=== Previous routes ===

SH 89 was originally defined on August 21, 1923 as a route from Burleson to Meridian, replacing a portion of SH 2. On March 19, 1930, this route was cancelled, and SH 89 was redesignated along a route from Weatherford to Strawn (unnumbered before that). On November 30, 1932, SH 89 was extended north to Gainesville, overtaking SH 169. On July 15, 1935, the section from Weatherford to Gainesville was cancelled (though at least one section was not cancelled until it was built as part of the lateral road program). The remaining section was transferred to US 80/SH 1 (did not take effect until this part of SH 89 was surfaced).

== Major intersections ==
The entire route is in San Patricio County.

mi	km	Destinations	Notes
0.00	0.00	US 181 / SH 188 – Corpus Christi, Rockport	Interchange; southern terminus
1.61	2.59	Bus. US 77 – Sinton	Northbound entrance and southbound exit
2.29	3.69	US 77 – Odem, Refugio	At-grade intersection with US 77 frontage roads, future I-69E
3.34	5.38	US 181 – Beeville	Interchange; northern terminus
1.000 mi = 1.609 km; 1.000 km = 0.621 mi: Incomplete access
