= Driscoll, Texas =

- City
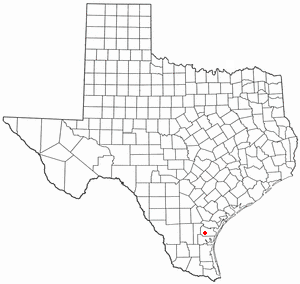
- Location of Driscoll, Texas

- Coordinates: 27°40′21″N 97°45′4″W
- Country: United States
- State: Texas
- County: Nueces

Area
  - Total: 1.16 sq mi (3.01 km^{2})
  - Land: 1.16 sq mi (3.01 km^{2})
  - Water: 0 sq mi (0.00 km^{2})
- Elevation: 62 ft (19 m)

Population (2020)
  - Total: 680
  - Density: 641.0/sq mi (247.51/km^{2})
- Time zone: UTC-6 (Central (CST))
  - Summer (DST): UTC-5 (CDT)
- ZIP code: 78351
- Area code: 361
- FIPS code: 48-21436
- GNIS feature ID: 1334624
- Website: cityofdriscoll.com

Driscoll is a city in Nueces County, Texas, United States. Its population was 680 at the 2020 census, down from 739 at the 2010 census.

== History ==
Driscoll formed around the railroad, which arrived in the area in 1904. The area was named after a local rancher, Robert Driscoll, Jr.

== Geography ==
Driscoll is located at 27°40′21″N 97°45′4″W (27.672549, –97.751059).

According to the United States Census Bureau, the city has a total area of 1.1 square miles (2.8 km^{2}), all land.

== Demographics ==
Historical population
Census	Pop.	Note	%±
1960	669		—
1970	626		−6.4%
1980	648		3.5%
1990	688		6.2%
2000	825		19.9%
2010	739		−10.4%
2020	680		−8.0%
U.S. Decennial Census

=== 2020 census ===
As of the 2020 census, Driscoll had a population of 680. The median age was 35.6 years, 29.1% of residents were under the age of 18, and 16.5% of residents were 65 years of age or older. For every 100 females there were 93.2 males, and for every 100 females age 18 and over there were 100.0 males age 18 and over.

There were 208 households in Driscoll, of which 47.1% had children under the age of 18 living in them. Of all households, 51.9% were married-couple households, 17.3% were households with a male householder and no spouse or partner present, and 24.5% were households with a female householder and no spouse or partner present. About 14.9% of all households were made up of individuals and 6.2% had someone living alone who was 65 years of age or older.

There were 239 housing units, of which 13.0% were vacant. The homeowner vacancy rate was 0.0% and the rental vacancy rate was 1.6%.

0.0% of residents lived in urban areas, while 100.0% lived in rural areas.

Racial composition as of the 2020 census
Race	Number	Percent
White	365	53.7%
Black or African American	1	0.1%
American Indian and Alaska Native	3	0.4%
Asian	2	0.3%
Native Hawaiian and Other Pacific Islander	0	0.0%
Some other race	76	11.2%
Two or more races	233	34.3%
Hispanic or Latino (of any race)	617	90.7%

=== 2000 census ===
As of the 2000 census, 825 people, 256 households, and 197 families were residing in the city. The population density was 731.4 people/sq mi (281.9/km^{2}). The 297 housing units averaged 263.3/sq mi (101.5/km^{2}). The racial makeup of the city was 55.27% White, 0.48% African American, 0.61% Asian, 0.12% Pacific Islander, 38.18% from other races, and 5.33% from two or more races. Hispanics or Latinos of any race were 84.00% of the population.

Of the 256 households, 37.9% had children under 18 living with them, 59.8% were married couples living together, 14.8% had a female householder with no husband present, and 22.7% were not families. About 20.7% of all households were made up of individuals, and 12.5% had someone living alone who was 65 or older. The average household size was 3.22, and the average family size was 3.72.

In the city, the age distribution was 31.0% under 18, 10.8% from 18 to 24, 24.8% from 25 to 44, 21.2% from 45 to 64, and 12.1% who were 65 or older. The median age was 31 years. For every 100 females, there were 90.1 males. For every 100 females age 18 and over, there were 89.0 males.

The median income for a household in the city was $34,583, and for a family was $35,714. Males had a median income of $28,000 versus $19,750 for females. The per capita income for the city was $11,707. About 14.1% of families and 13.9% of the population were below the poverty line, including 9.1% of those under age 18 and 29.9% of those age 65 or over.

== Travel ==
- U.S. Highway 77 (Interstate 69E) in Driscoll has the speed limit drop from 70 to 40 mph. Traffic violations are a major source of public revenue. The Driscoll Bypass opened to northbound traffic in 2021, with the southbound lanes opening in August 2023.
- Corpus Christi International Airport

== Education ==
Driscoll Independent School District is the local school district.

Del Mar College is the designated community college for all of Nueces County.
