= Texas State Highway Loop 463 =

State highway in Texas

State Highway Loop 463
- Zac Lentz Parkway

Route information
- Maintained by TxDOT
- Length: 5.749 mi (9.252 km)

Major junctions
- West end: US 77 / Bus. US 77 in Victoria
- East end: Future I-69 / US 59 in Victoria

Location
- Country: United States
- State: Texas
- Counties: Victoria

Highway system
- Highways in Texas; Interstate; US; State; Former; Toll; Loops; Spurs; FM/RM; Park; Rec
← Loop 462	→ Loop 464

Texas State Highway Loop 463 (Loop 463) is a state highway loop in the city of Victoria in the U.S. state of Texas. The highway composes the eastern segment of the Zac Lentz Parkway; the western section carries US 77.

== Route description ==
The Loop 463 designation officially begins at an interchange with Future I-69/US 59; however, state maintenance of the roadway continues along Burroughsville Road for approximately 500 feet to the Victoria city limits. From this interchange, the roadway travels to the northwest, crossing Lone Tree Road at an at-grade intersection before meeting Bus. US 59 at a folded diamond interchange. It then turns into a freeway-grade roadway, and Loop 463 has interchanges at Airline Road, Mockingbird Lane, and Salem Road before turning due west. The Loop 463 designation ends at an interchange with Navarro Street, which carries Bus. US 77 into downtown Victoria and northbound US 77 towards Hallettsville. Zac Lentz Parkway continues past this point carrying southbound US 77.

== History ==
Loop 463 was first designated on May 23, 1968. The designation was truncated to its current routing on April 25, 2002, when US 77 was rerouted around the west and north sides of Victoria along the parkway. The segment that was removed along Navarro Street became part of Bus. US 77.

The northern freeway segment of Loop 463 was completed in 2013 after two years of construction. The main lanes were constructed and interchanges were added at several junctions.

== Major intersections ==
The entire route is in Victoria, Victoria County.

mi	km	Destinations	Notes
0.0	0.0	Future I-69 / US 59 – Goliad, El Campo, Houston	Exit 14 on I-69/US 59; southern terminus; roadway continues as Burroughsville Rd.; interchange; U.S. 59 is the future Interstate 69
0.4	0.64	Lone Tree Road	At-grade intersection; south end of freeway
1.3	2.1	Bus. US 59	No direct northbound exit (signed at Airline Road)
2.4	3.9	Airline Road	
3.8	6.1	Mockingbird Lane	Southbound exit and northbound entrance
4.6	7.4	FM 1315 (Salem Road)	Northbound exit and southbound entrance
5.7	9.2	US 77 / Bus. US 77 – Hallettsville	Northern terminus
1.000 mi = 1.609 km; 1.000 km = 0.621 mi: Incomplete access
