= Bishop Municipal Airport =

- IATA: none; ICAO: none; FAA LID: 07R

Summary
- Airport type: Public
- Owner: City of Bishop
- Serves: Bishop, Texas
- Elevation AMSL: 55 ft (17 m)
- Coordinates: 27°36′37″N 097°45′09″W

Map
- Location within Texas

Runways
Direction	Length		Surface
Direction	ft	m	Surface
15/33	3,200	975	Asphalt

Statistics (2011)
- Aircraft operations: 5,400
- Based aircraft: 18
- Source: Federal Aviation Administration

Bishop Municipal Airport (FAA LID: 07R) is a city-owned public-use airport located three nautical miles (3.5 mi; 5.6 km) northeast of the central business district of Bishop, a city in Nueces County, Texas, United States.

== Facilities and aircraft ==
Bishop Municipal Airport covers an area of 250 acres (100 ha) at an elevation of 55 feet (17 m) above mean sea level. It has one runway designated 15/33 with an asphalt surface measuring 3,200 by 50 feet (975 by 15 m).

For the 12-month period ending March 5, 2011, the airport had 5,400 general aviation aircraft operations, an average of 14 per day. At that time there were 18 single-engine aircraft based at this airport.

== See also ==
- List of airports in Texas
