= Bishop, Texas =

- City
- Interactive map of Bishop, Texas
- Coordinates: 27°35′7″N 97°47′58″W
- Country: United States
- State: Texas
- County: Nueces
- Established: http://directory.tml.org/profile/city/1335

Area
  - Total: 2.41 sq mi (6.25 km^{2})
  - Land: 2.41 sq mi (6.25 km^{2})
  - Water: 0 sq mi (0.00 km^{2})
- Elevation: 59 ft (18 m)

Population (2020)
  - Total: 3,174
  - Density: 1,320/sq mi (508/km^{2})
- Time zone: UTC-6 (Central (CST))
  - Summer (DST): UTC-5 (CDT)
- ZIP code: 78343
- Area code: 361
- FIPS code: 48-08392
- GNIS feature ID: 1330715
- Website: www.cityofbishoptx.com

Bishop is a city in Nueces County, Texas, United States. The population was 3,174 as of the 2020 census, up from 3,134 in the 2010 census.

== Geography ==
Bishop is located at 27°35′7″N 97°47′58″W (27.585178, –97.799437). According to the United States Census Bureau, the city has a total area of 2.4 square miles (6.2 km^{2}), all land.

It is located on U.S. Highway 77 (Interstate 69E) and Farm to Market Road 70. Bishop is located eight miles north of Kingsville and approximately thirty miles southwest of Corpus Christi.

=== Climate ===
The climate in this area is characterized by hot, humid summers and generally mild to cool winters. According to the Köppen Climate Classification system, Bishop has a humid subtropical climate, abbreviated "Cfa" on climate maps.

Climate data for Bishop, Texas (1991-2020 normals)
Month	Jan	Feb	Mar	Apr	May	Jun	Jul	Aug	Sep	Oct	Nov	Dec	Year
Mean daily maximum °F (°C)	68.0 (20.0)	71.1 (21.7)	77.0 (25.0)	83.1 (28.4)	88.3 (31.3)	92.9 (33.8)	95.2 (35.1)	97.1 (36.2)	91.0 (32.8)	85.9 (29.9)	76.6 (24.8)	70.0 (21.1)	83.0 (28.3)
Daily mean °F (°C)	56.5 (13.6)	60.2 (15.7)	66.4 (19.1)	72.8 (22.7)	78.7 (25.9)	83.4 (28.6)	85.2 (29.6)	86.2 (30.1)	81.2 (27.3)	74.7 (23.7)	65.0 (18.3)	58.3 (14.6)	72.4 (22.4)
Mean daily minimum °F (°C)	44.9 (7.2)	49.4 (9.7)	55.8 (13.2)	62.5 (16.9)	69.1 (20.6)	73.9 (23.3)	75.1 (23.9)	75.3 (24.1)	71.5 (21.9)	63.5 (17.5)	53.4 (11.9)	46.6 (8.1)	61.8 (16.5)
Average precipitation inches (mm)	1.47 (37)	1.57 (40)	1.68 (43)	1.53 (39)	3.32 (84)	2.28 (58)	2.12 (54)	2.68 (68)	5.15 (131)	3.10 (79)	1.68 (43)	2.18 (55)	28.76 (731)
Average precipitation days (≥ 0.01 in)	6.8	6.4	4.7	4.4	4.4	4.9	6.9	4.8	8.9	5.1	4.9	5.2	67.4
Source: NOAA

== Demographics ==
Historical population
Census	Pop.	Note	%±
1930	953		—
1940	1,329		39.5%
1950	2,731		105.5%
1960	3,722		36.3%
1970	3,466		−6.9%
1980	3,706		6.9%
1990	3,337		−10.0%
2000	3,305		−1.0%
2010	3,134		−5.2%
2020	3,174		1.3%
U.S. Decennial Census

=== 2020 census ===
As of the 2020 census, Bishop had a population of 3,174, 1,122 households, and 902 families residing in the city.

The median age was 37.0 years. 27.9% of residents were under the age of 18 and 14.9% of residents were 65 years of age or older. For every 100 females there were 95.3 males, and for every 100 females age 18 and over there were 95.6 males age 18 and over.

0% of residents lived in urban areas, while 100.0% lived in rural areas.

There were 1,122 households in Bishop, of which 42.1% had children under the age of 18 living in them. Of all households, 48.3% were married-couple households, 17.8% were households with a male householder and no spouse or partner present, and 27.6% were households with a female householder and no spouse or partner present. About 21.4% of all households were made up of individuals and 10.0% had someone living alone who was 65 years of age or older.

There were 1,311 housing units, of which 14.4% were vacant. Among occupied housing units, 70.1% were owner-occupied and 29.9% were renter-occupied. The homeowner vacancy rate was 1.5% and the rental vacancy rate was 15.9%.

Racial composition as of the 2020 census
Race	Percent
White	58.4%
Black or African American	1.0%
American Indian and Alaska Native	0.8%
Asian	0.8%
Native Hawaiian and Other Pacific Islander	0.1%
Some other race	11.3%
Two or more races	27.6%
Hispanic or Latino (of any race)	72.6%

Bishop racial composition (NH = Non-Hispanic) (Note: Note: the US Census treats Hispanic/Latino as an ethnic category. This table excludes Latinos from the racial categories and assigns them to a separate category. Hispanics/Latinos can be of any race.)
Race	Number	Percentage
White (NH)	763	24.04%
Black or African American (NH)	24	0.76%
Native American or Alaska Native (NH)	10	0.32%
Asian (NH)	24	0.76%
Some Other Race (NH)	12	0.38%
Mixed/Multi-Racial (NH)	37	1.17%
Hispanic or Latino	2,304	72.59%
Total	3,174	

=== 2000 census ===
As of the census of 2000, there were 3,305 people, 1,132 households, and 868 families residing in the city. The population density was 1,394.1 inhabitants per square mile (538.3/km^{2}). There were 1,269 housing units at an average density of 535.3 units per square mile (206.7 units/km^{2}). The racial makeup of the city was 84.11% White, 0.97% African American, 0.57% Native American, 0.12% Asian, 0.06% Pacific Islander, 11.71% from other races, and 2.45% from two or more races. Hispanic or Latino of any race were 60.00% of the population.

There were 1,132 households, out of which 38.3% had children under the age of 18 living with them, 58.9% were married couples living together, 14.3% had a female householder with no husband present, and 23.3% were non-families. 20.4% of all households were made up of individuals, and 11.5% had someone living alone who was 65 years of age or older. The average household size was 2.92 and the average family size was 3.41.

In the city, the population was spread out, with 30.0% under the age of 18, 8.6% from 18 to 24, 27.2% from 25 to 44, 21.3% from 45 to 64, and 12.9% who were 65 years of age or older. The median age was 34 years. For every 100 females, there were 93.0 males. For every 100 females age 18 and over, there were 89.3 males.

The median income for a household in the city was $35,434, and the median income for a family was $41,250. Males had a median income of $30,469 versus $22,316 for females. The per capita income for the city was $14,974. About 12.2% of families and 14.1% of the population were below the poverty line, including 17.6% of those under age 18 and 13.5% of those ages 65 or over.

== Education ==
The City of Bishop is served by the Bishop Consolidated Independent School District, which has five schools:

- Bishop High School (Grades 9–12)
- Luehrs Junior High School(Grades 6–8)
- Bishop Elementary School(Grades 4–5)
- Bishop Primary School (Grades PK–3)
- Petronila Elementary School(Grades PK–5)

The BCISD now has a new high school building that opened in the fall of 2010, shifting the high school to this new location and moving Luehrs Junior High into the former high school building. The former Luehrs Junior High building was demolished and tennis courts for the district's students were put in its previous location.

Del Mar College is the designated community college for all of Nueces County.

== Transportation ==
The Bishop Municipal Airport is located three nautical miles (3.5 mi; 5.6 km) northeast of Bishop's central business district.

== See also ==
- List of cities in Texas
