= Riviera Beach, Texas =

- Location within Texas Location within the United States
- Coordinates: 27.2892°N 97.6669°W
- Country: United States
- State: Texas
- County: Kleberg
- Time zone: CST
  - Summer (DST): CDT
- ZIP code: 78379
- Area code: 361

Riviera Beach is a small community located along Baffin Bay in Kleberg County, Texas.

== History ==
Riviera Beach was founded in 1907 by Minnesota-developer Theodore Koch, who purchased land along Baffin Bay and built a resort community named Riviera Beach. At this time, Koch also developed the main town of Riviera about 10 miles (16 km) to the west. Land divided into plots were sold to farmers in the area after survey. Koch planned to construct a road connecting Riviera to Riviera Beach, of which only a small portion was complete. In Riviera Beach, a hotel, ice plant, waterworks, and a large pier began to operate. Businesses soon followed along with a lavish park designed by a florist from Pasadena, California. A bank and telephone exchange were established in 1910. In 1912, two railroads were opened to connect Riviera Beach to Riviera, and a functional post office opened two years later. The next year, enough children resided in the town to allow the opening of a school. The resort quickly became a popular spot for water sports such as fishing and swimming. By 1916, the community was populated by 30-40 families. The popularity of Riviera Beach also caused settlers to build the former community of Vattman.

Later that year, the 1916 Texas hurricane destroyed most of the area, with most residents fleeing and the hotel becoming the only remaining business. The railroad also ceased operations, and parts were dismantled and sold. A drought in 1918 and the beginning of World War I further caused a further lack of growth in population. The population had diminished so severely in Riviera Beach that only two families remained in 1941.

During World War II, the community hotel, although still intact, was only briefly reopened. This was used to house soldiers from NAS Kingsville. The hotel was later sold to the Riviera Beach Hotel Corp. in 1946, but was never successful, being destroyed during a fire in 1952. No businesses were present until the 1950s when a bait shop was opened. Some growth occurred by 1990, with 50 residents moving to Riviera Beach. A county pier and some vacation homes were constructed around this time, the former being used by fishermen. Riviera became connected to US Route 77 through a farm road in Vattman.

== Climate ==
Riviera Beach has a humid subtropical climate, with the average humidity peaking at 74% in May. The wettest month in Riviera Beach is also May, with an average of 2.6 inches (66 mm) of precipitation on average. This is followed closely by June with an average precipitation amount of 2.2 inches (56 mm). August has the highest average hours of sun with 365 hours on average.

Being in South Texas, impacts from tropical cyclones are common in Riviera Beach. The community was heavily damaged by the 1916 Texas hurricane, which produced 90 mph (140 km/h) winds in the area. Tropical storm-force winds were reported as a result of Hurricane Celia in 1970. The eye of Hurricane Bret in 1999 passed south of Riviera Beach. Storm chaser Josh Morgerman recorded a minimum barometric pressure of 1,008.2 mbar (29.77 inHg) during 2011's Tropical Storm Don in Riviera Beach. In 2020, Hurricane Hanna brought heavy rainfall and destroyed the community pier which later reopened in 2021.

== Education ==
Riviera Beach is served by the Riviera Independent School District.

== See also ==
- Loyola Beach, Texas
