= Texas State Highway 188 =

State highway in Texas

State Highway 188
- SH 188, highlighted in red

Route information
- Maintained by TxDOT
- Length: 41.327 mi (66.509 km) Excludes length of US 181 overlap in Sinton
- Existed: 1993–present

Major junctions
- West end: I-37 south of Mathis
- US 77 in Sinton; US 181 in Sinton; SH 35 northeast of Aransas Pass
- East end: Bus. SH 35 northeast of Aransas Pass

Location
- Country: United States
- State: Texas

Highway system
- Highways in Texas; Interstate; US; State; Former; Toll; Loops; Spurs; FM/RM; Park; Rec
← SH 187	→ SH 189

State Highway 188 (SH 188) is a state highway in the Coastal Bend region of Texas. It runs 41.327 miles (66.509 km) from Mathis east to Aransas Bay between Rockport and Port Aransas. SH 188 was established in its current form in 1992, after a previous incarnation existed from 1932 to 1942.

== History ==
=== Previous route ===
SH 188 was previously designated on November 30, 1932, as a connector route between then-SH 5 and Roxton. This route was canceled on April 29, 1942, and was replaced by FM 38.

=== Current route ===
SH 188 was designated on December 22, 1992, replacing part of FM 881 and part of FM 1069, of which SH 188 was concurrent with. On June 29, 1993, SH 188 was extended 1.8 miles (2.9 km) over another part of FM 1069, canceling the section of FM 1069 east of the junction with SH 188, transferring it to SH 188, and the remainder of FM 881 was redesignated as part of FM 1069.

== Major intersections ==
County	Location	mi	km	Destinations	Notes
San Patricio				I-37	I-37 exit 31; western terminus.
San Patricio				FM 796	
San Patricio				FM 630	
San Patricio	Sinton			US 77 / Future I-69E	
San Patricio	Sinton			US 181 north / Bus. US 77 south	West end of US 181 & Bus. US 77 overlaps
San Patricio	Sinton			Bus. US 77	East end of Bus. US 77 overlap
San Patricio	Sinton			FM 2046	
San Patricio	Sinton			US 181 south / SH 89	East end of US 181 overlap
San Patricio				FM 631	
San Patricio				FM 136	
Aransas				FM 1069	
Aransas				SH 35	
Aransas				Bus. SH 35	Eastern terminus
1.000 mi = 1.609 km; 1.000 km = 0.621 mi: Concurrency terminus

== See also ==
- List of state highways in Texas
