= Tivoli, Texas =

- Unincorporated community / Census-designated place (CDP)
- Interactive map of Tivoli, Texas
- Coordinates: 28°27′39″N 96°53′29″W
- Country: United States
- State: Texas
- County: Refugio

Area
  - Total: 1.1 sq mi (2.8 km^{2})
  - Land: 1.1 sq mi (2.8 km^{2})
  - Water: 0.0 sq mi (0 km^{2})

Population (2010)
  - Total: 479
  - Density: 440/sq mi (170/km^{2})
- Time zone: UTC-6 (Central (CST))
  - Summer (DST): UTC-5 (CDT)
- Zip Code: 77990

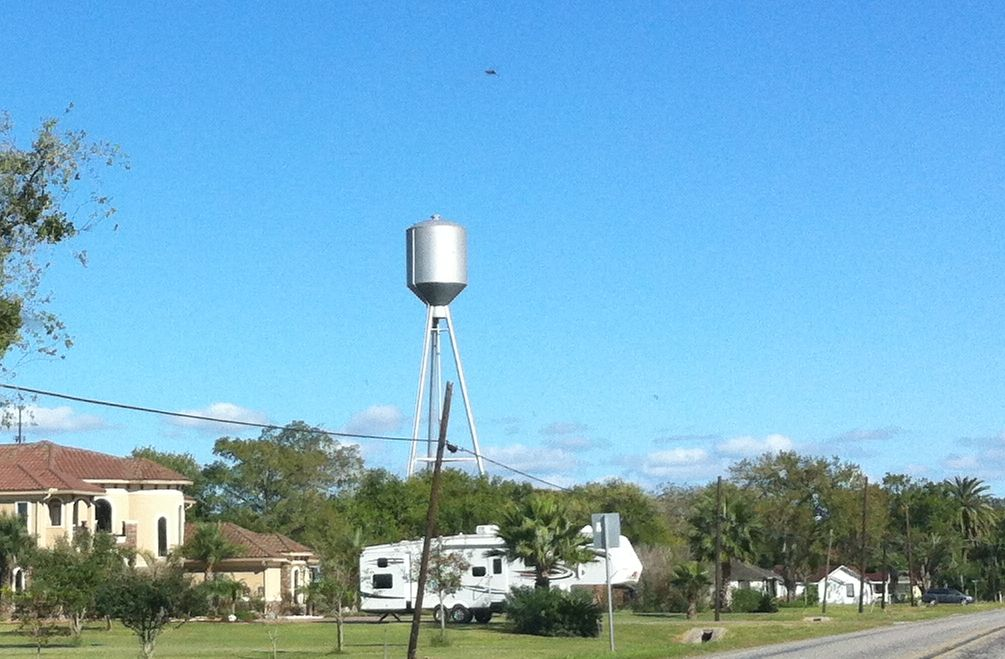
Water tower in Tivoli, Texas, viewed from west.

Tivoli is a census-designated place and unincorporated community in Refugio County, Texas, United States. It takes its name from the town of Tivoli in the Lazio region of central Italy. It was a new CDP for the 2010 census. As of the 2020 census, Tivoli had a population of 419.

== Geography ==
Tivoli is located at 28°27′39″N 96°53′29″W (28.460839, -96.891470). The CDP has a total area of 1.1 square miles (2.8 km^{2}), all land.

== Demographics ==
Historical population
Census	Pop.	Note	%±
2010	479		—
2020	419		−12.5%
U.S. Decennial Census; 1850–1900 1910; 1920 1930 1940; 1950 1960 1970; 1980 1990 2000; 2010 2020

Tivoli first appeared as a census designated place in the 2010 U.S. census.

=== 2020 census ===
Tivoli CDP, Texas – Racial and ethnic composition Note: the US Census treats Hispanic/Latino as an ethnic category. This table excludes Latinos from the racial categories and assigns them to a separate category. Hispanics/Latinos may be of any race.
Race / Ethnicity (NH = Non-Hispanic)	Pop 2010	Pop 2020	% 2010	% 2020
White alone (NH)	93	97	19.42%	23.15%
Black or African American alone (NH)	6	10	1.25%	2.39%
Native American or Alaska Native alone (NH)	1	0	0.21%	0.00%
Asian alone (NH)	1	1	0.21%	0.24%
Native Hawaiian or Pacific Islander alone (NH)	0	0	0.00%	0.00%
Other race alone (NH)	0	0	0.00%	0.00%
Mixed race or Multiracial (NH)	4	5	0.84%	1.19%
Hispanic or Latino (any race)	374	306	78.08%	73.03%
Total	479	419	100.00%	100.00%

== Education ==
The Austwell-Tivoli Independent School District serves area students and home to the Austwell-Tivoli elementary-high School Redfish. Austwell-Tivoli School went under recent building additions, adding a full new sector.
