= Sebastian, Texas =

- CDP
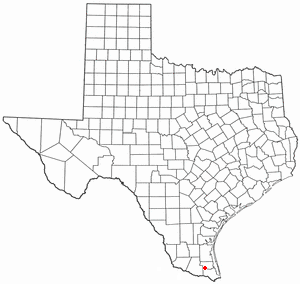
- Location of Sebastian, Texas

- Coordinates: 26°20′36″N 97°47′36″W
- Country: United States
- State: Texas
- County: Willacy

Area
  - Total: 1.7 sq mi (4.3 km^{2})
  - Land: 1.7 sq mi (4.3 km^{2})
  - Water: 0 sq mi (0.0 km^{2})
- Elevation: 39 ft (12 m)

Population (2020)
  - Total: 1,684
  - Density: 1,000/sq mi (390/km^{2})
- Time zone: UTC-6 (Central (CST))
  - Summer (DST): UTC-5 (CDT)
- ZIP code: 78594
- Area code: 956
- FIPS code: 48-66512
- GNIS feature ID: 1346856

Sebastian is a census-designated place (CDP) in Willacy County, Texas, United States. The population was 1,684 at the 2020 census.

== Geography ==
Sebastian is located at 26°20′36″N 97°47′36″W (26.343249, -97.793347).

According to the United States Census Bureau, the CDP has a total area of 1.7 square miles (4.3 km^{2}), all land.

== Demographics ==
Historical population
Census	Pop.	Note	%±
1990	1,598		—
2000	1,864		16.6%
2010	1,917		2.8%
2020	1,684		−12.2%
U.S. Decennial Census; 1850–1900 1910; 1920 1930 1940; 1950 1960 1970; 1980 1990 2000; 2010 2020

Sebastian first appeared as a census designated place in the 1990U.S. Census.

=== 2020 census ===
Sebastian CDP, Texas – Racial and ethnic composition Note: the US Census treats Hispanic/Latino as an ethnic category. This table excludes Latinos from the racial categories and assigns them to a separate category. Hispanics/Latinos may be of any race.
Race / Ethnicity (NH = Non-Hispanic)	Pop 2000	Pop 2010	Pop 2020	% 2000	% 2010	% 2020
White alone (NH)	81	96	76	4.35%	5.01%	4.51%
Black or African American alone (NH)	1	5	1	0.05%	0.26%	0.06%
Native American or Alaska Native alone (NH)	1	1	15	0.05%	0.05%	0.89%
Asian alone (NH)	0	0	0	0.00%	0.00%	0.00%
Native Hawaiian or Pacific Islander alone (NH)	0	0	2	0.00%	0.00%	0.12%
Other race alone (NH)	0	2	2	0.00%	0.10%	0.12%
Mixed race or Multiracial (NH)	1	0	7	0.05%	0.00%	0.42%
Hispanic or Latino (any race)	1,780	1,813	1,581	95.49%	94.57%	93.88%
Total	1,864	1,917	1,684	100.00%	100.00%	100.00%

=== 2000 census ===
As of the census of 2000, there were 1,864 people, 535 households, and 438 families residing in the CDP. The population density was 1,118.4 inhabitants per square mile (431.8/km^{2}). There were 645 housing units at an average density of 387.0 per square mile (149.4/km^{2}). The racial makeup of the CDP was 70.60% White, 0.27% African American, 0.11% Native American, 0.05% Pacific Islander, 26.56% from other races, and 2.41% from two or more races. Hispanic or Latino of any race were 95.49% of the population.

There were 535 households, out of which 44.7% had children under the age of 18 living with them, 59.8% were married couples living together, 17.8% had a female householder with no husband present, and 18.1% were non-families. 17.8% of all households were made up of individuals, and 9.5% had someone living alone who was 65 years of age or older. The average household size was 3.48 and the average family size was 3.97.

In the CDP, the population was spread out, with 34.5% under the age of 18, 12.0% from 18 to 24, 25.3% from 25 to 44, 18.9% from 45 to 64, and 9.4% who were 65 years of age or older. The median age was 28 years. For every 100 females, there were 97.0 males. For every 100 females age 18 and over, there were 92.9 males.

The median income for a household in the CDP was $20,179, and the median income for a family was $24,732. Males had a median income of $18,854 versus $13,977 for females. The per capita income for the CDP was $11,934. About 22.6% of families and 26.8% of the population were below the poverty line, including 35.7% of those under age 18 and 40.6% of those age 65 or over.

== Education ==
Sebastian is served by the Lyford Consolidated Independent School District.

In addition, South Texas Independent School District operates magnet schools that serve the community.

== Government and infrastructure ==
The United States Postal Service operates the Sebastian Post Office.
