= Interstate 69C =

Interstate Highway in Hidalgo County, Texas, United States

Interstate 69C
- I-69C Future or proposed segments

Route information
- Auxiliary route of I-69
- Maintained by TxDOT
- Length: 18 mi (29 km)
- Existed: May 30, 2013–present
- NHS: Entire route

Major junctions
- South end: I-2 / US 83 / US 281 in Pharr
- North end: US 281 / FM 490 in Edinburg

Location
- Country: United States
- State: Texas
- Counties: Hidalgo

Highway system
- Interstate Highway System; Main; Auxiliary; Suffixed; Business; Future; Highways in Texas; Interstate; US; State; Former; Toll; Loops; Spurs; FM/RM; Park; Rec
← I-69	→ I-69E

Interstate 69C (I-69C (Note: Some sources use "IH-69C", as "IH" is an abbreviation used by TxDOT for Interstate Highways.)) is a north–south Interstate Highway running through South Texas. Once complete, the freeway (with connections to both Federal Highway 40 and Federal Highway 97) will begin at I-2/U.S. Highway 83 (US 83) in Pharr and head northward before terminating at I-69W/US 59 in George West near I-37. For its entire length, I-69C is concurrent with US 281. As of 2023, only an 18-mile (29 km) segment has been completed from the route's southern terminus in Pharr.

== Route description ==
I-69C begins at a three-way stack interchange with I-2/US 83 and US 281 (North Cage Boulevard) in the northern part of Pharr. I-69C only has direct connections from its southbound lanes to westbound (exit 1A) and eastbound (exit 1B) I-2/US 83 and flyover ramps coming from either direction of I-2/US 83 to I-69C northbound. Traffic approaching the interchange from the south on US 281 or wanting to head south on US 281 from the interchange can only access either Interstate via its frontage roads, and vice versa. The Texas Department of Transportation (TxDOT) contracted work to increase capacity for the I-2/I-69C interchange in August of 2019. This construction widened the four direct connectors between I-2/US 83 and I-69C from one lane to two lanes each.

Immediately north of I-2, US 281 (North Cage Boulevard) splits into a one-way couplet and becomes the frontage roads for I-69C. North of State Highway 495 (SH 495; East Ferguson Avenue), an entrance ramp carries US 281 North onto the Interstate's mainline. The southbound exit ramp to Sioux Road and SH 495 carries US 281 South onto the frontage road.

Continuing north from this interchange, I-69C enters Edinburg. The Interstate intersects the south terminus of Business US 281-W (Bus. US 281-W), which continues north through central Edinburg on US 281's original alignment. I-69C/US 281 curves to the northeast from this point for about two miles (3.2 km) before it turns due north again. I-69C reaches Bus. US 281-W on the north side of the city, then passes the small community of Faysville before terminating at its overpass over FM 490. The freeway downgrades to an expressway beyond here and continues on as US 281.

== History ==
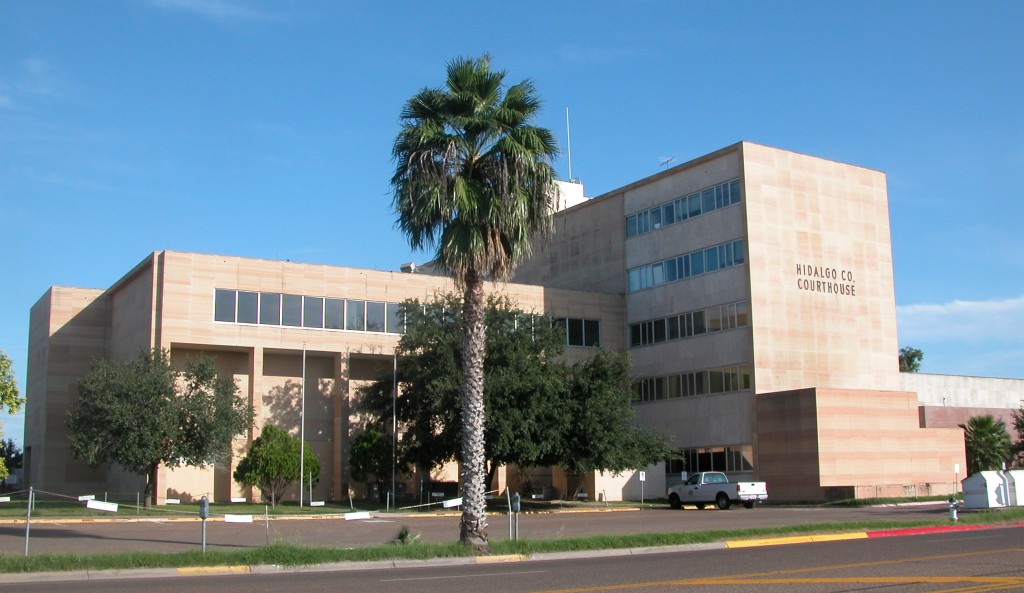
Hidalgo County Courthouse in Edinburg near the temporary northern terminus of I-69C

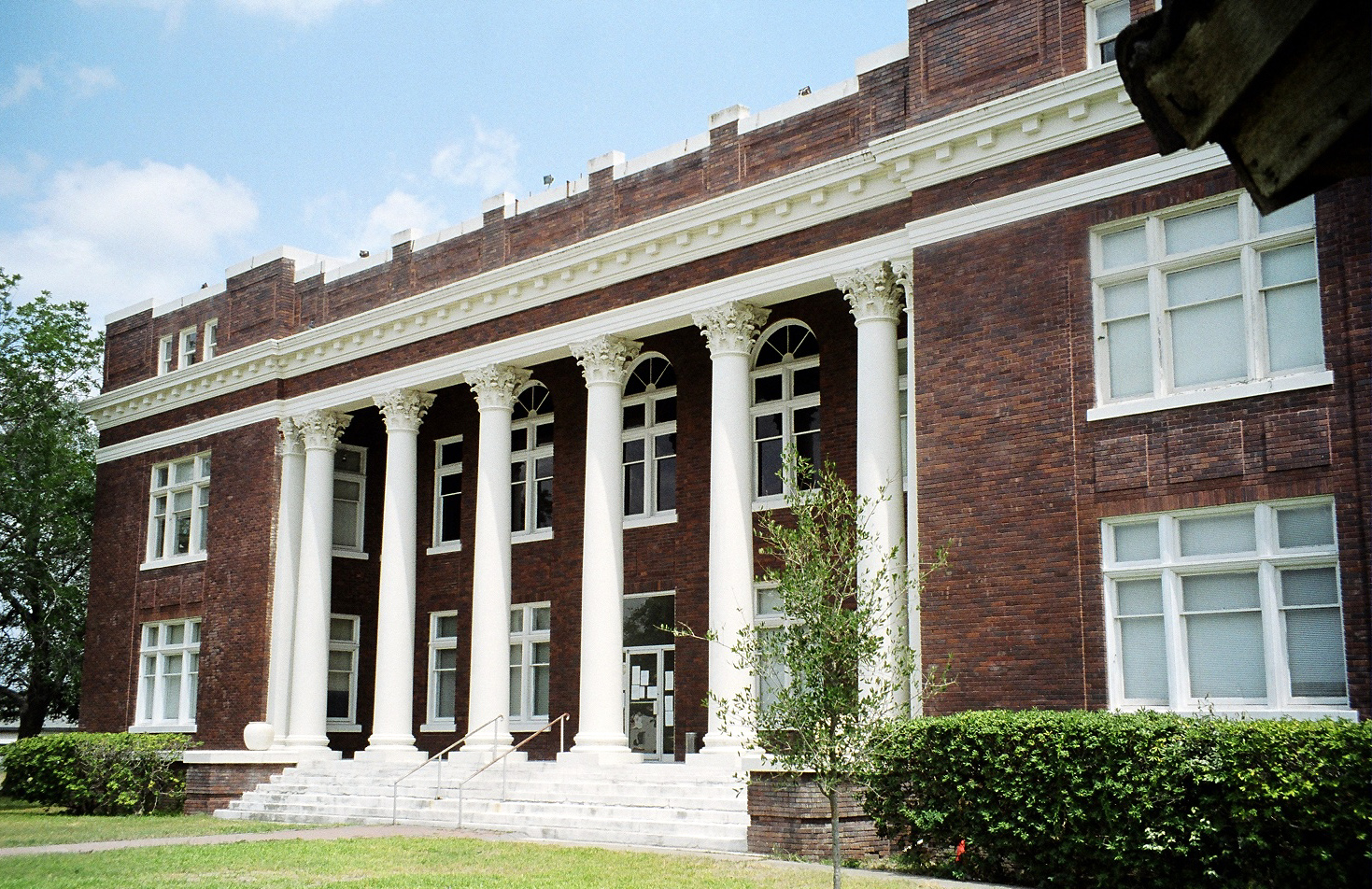
Live Oak County Courthouse in George West near the future northern terminus of I-69C

The Federal Highway Administration (FHWA) approved the designation for the Lower Rio Grande Valley Segment on May 24, 2013, and the Texas Transportation Commission followed suit on May 30, 2013. This action finalized the designations of not only I-69C but also of the sections of I-69E from Brownsville north to north of Raymondville and also I-2 which is a 46.8-mile (75.3 km) freeway connecting with I-69C and I-69E in Pharr and Harlingen. These approvals added over 100 miles (160 km) to the Interstate Highway System in the Rio Grande Valley. The signage was installed in mid-2013.

As of July 2021, the cluster consisting of the recently designated portions of I-69C, I-69E, and I-2 in the Rio Grande Valley is not connected to the national Interstate network. This situation is slated to be remedied by scheduled projects to complete I-69E along US 77 between Raymondville and Robstown and the southern end of the previously signed portion of the I-69 corridor connecting with I-37 west of Corpus Christi. The Environmental Protection Agency (EPA) approval for the upgrade of the US 77 alignment to Interstate standards, including bypasses of the towns along the 91-mile (146 km) routing, was obtained through a Finding of No Significant Impact statement issued on July 13, 2012; funding for the various upgrade projects became available after 2015. During August 2014, exit numbering began on the south most segment of I-69C in Edinburg.

As of 2023, the only segment of US 281 to be constructed to Interstate standards not currently connected to I-69C is the segment through Falfurrias. Construction to upgrade a bypass that had been built around Alice began in 2023 with completion set for 2027. Another bypass for Premont began construction in 2019. The southbound lanes of the bypass opened to traffic on October 25, 2023 (the northbound lanes had been opened in 2022). The project was completed in 2024. In August 2023, $100.8 million in funding was allocated to upgrade US 281 to a freeway between Falfurrias and Premont, although construction will not begin until 2029. Construction to upgrade the segment of US 281 between FM 490 and SH 186 to Interstate standards began in 2025. Other projects between Alice and Linn-San Manuel are in varying stages of planning and funding with plans north of Alice not announced yet.

== Exit list ==
County	Location	mi	km	Exit	Destinations	Notes
Hidalgo	Pharr	0.00	0.00	1A-B	I-2 / US 83 – McAllen, Harlingen	Signed as exits 1A (west) and 1B (east); exits 146A-B on I-2
Hidalgo	Pharr	0.35	0.56	1C	US 281 south / SH 495 – Pharr	South end of US 281 overlap; southbound exit and northbound entrance
Hidalgo	Pharr	1.85	2.98	1E	FM 3461 (Nolana Loop)	
Hidalgo	Pharr–Edinburg line	2.99	4.81	2	Bus. US 281 north / Owassa Road – Edinburg	To Doctors Hospital at Renaissance
Hidalgo	Edinburg	4.00	6.44	3	Trenton Road	To Cornerstone Regional Hospital, Edinburg Regional Medical Center
Hidalgo	Edinburg	5.15	8.29	4	Canton Road / Veterans Boulevard	
Hidalgo	Edinburg	5.93	9.54	5	Freddy Gonzalez Drive / Sprague Street	
Hidalgo	Edinburg	6.95	11.18	6	SH 107 (University Drive)	
Hidalgo	Edinburg	7.44	11.97	7	FM 2128 / Schunior Road / Richardson Road / Chapin Road	
Hidalgo	Edinburg	8.98	14.45	8	Russell Road / Rogers Road	
Hidalgo	Edinburg	9.48	15.26	9	FM 1925 (Monte Cristo Road)	
Hidalgo	Edinburg	10.09	16.24	10	Bus. US 281 south – Edinburg	Southbound exit and northbound entrance
Hidalgo	Edinburg	11.04– 11.61	17.77– 18.68	11	Davis Drive / Ramseyer Road	
Hidalgo	Edinburg	12.98	20.89	12	FM 2812	
Hidalgo	Edinburg			14	Faysville	Northbound exit only
Hidalgo	Edinburg	15.16	24.40	15	FM 162 (El Cibolo Road)	
Hidalgo	Edinburg	17.56	28.26	17	FM 490	To South Texas International Airport at Edinburg
Hidalgo	Edinburg	18.15	29.21	18	SH 68 south	Future northern terminus of SH 68; future interchange
Hidalgo		19.30	31.06	19	Laguna Seca Road	Interchange under construction
Hidalgo		21.20	34.12	21	Red Gate Road	Interchange under construction
Hidalgo		23.10	37.18	23	Los Venados Drive	Interchange under construction
Hidalgo	Linn	25.00	40.23	25	SH 186 / FM 1017	Interchange
Hidalgo		26.78	43.10	26	El Rucio Road	Future interchange
Hidalgo		29.73	47.85	29	Frontage Road	Future interchange
Hidalgo				30	Frontage Road	Future interchange; northbound exit and entrance
Hidalgo		34.68	55.81	34	Frontage Road	Future interchange
Hidalgo		38.07	61.27	38	Frontage Road	Future interchange
Hidalgo		43.22	69.56	43	Frontage Road	Future interchange
Hidalgo		47.25	76.04	47	Frontage Road	Future interchange; southbound exit and northbound entrance
Brooks	Rachal	48.58	78.18	48	FM 755 west	Interchange
Brooks		50.5	81.3	50	Bus. US 281 north – Encino	Future interchange
Brooks		51.9	83.5	51	Las Cuatas Road	Future interchange
Brooks		52.3	84.2	52	Bus. US 281 south – Encino	Future interchange; northbound exit and entrance
Brooks				53	Frontage Road	Future interchange; southbound exit and entrance
Brooks		56.7	91.2	56	Frontage Road	Future interchange
Brooks				60	Frontage Road	Future interchange; southbound exit and entrance
Brooks		61.7	99.3	61	Frontage Road	Future interchange
Brooks		65.6	105.6	65	Frontage Road	Future interchange
Brooks		69.5	111.8	69	FM 3066	Interchange
Brooks	Falfurrias	71.1	114.4	71	Bus. US 281 north	Interchange
Brooks	Falfurrias	72.0	115.9	72A	SH 285 – Falfurrias	Interchange
Brooks	Falfurrias	72.8	117.2	72B	Bus. US 281 south	Interchange
Brooks		73.5	118.3	73	FM 1418	Interchange
Jim Wells	Premont	79.5	127.9	79	Bus. US 281 north / FM 716 – Premont	Interchange; northbound exit and southbound entrance
Jim Wells	Premont	82.2	132.3	82	NE 8th Street	Interchange
Jim Wells	Premont	82.9	133.4	83	Bus. US 281 south / FM 716 – Premont	Interchange; southbound exit and northbound entrance
Jim Wells		95.0	152.9	95	SH 141 / FM 2295 – Kingsville, Benavides	Interchange
Jim Wells	Ben Bolt	101.8	163.8	101	FM 2508 – Ben Bolt	Interchange
Jim Wells		104.4	168.0	104	Bus. US 281 north / FM 1930 – Alice	Interchange
Jim Wells		106.0	170.6	106	CR 129	Interchange under construction
Jim Wells		107.4	172.8	107	FM 1554	Interchange
Jim Wells		108.4	174.5	108	SH 44 / SH 359 – Alice, San Diego	Interchange
Jim Wells		109.9	176.9	110	CR 116 / CR 117	Interchange under construction
Jim Wells		111.9	180.1	112	Bus. US 281 south – Alice	Interchange
Jim Wells	Midway	127.8	205.7	128	FM 624 – Orange Grove, Cotulla	Interchange
Live Oak		134.0	215.7	134	FM 3162	Future interchange
Live Oak	George West	149.0	239.8	149	I-69W / US 59 / US 281 north – Freer, Laredo, Beeville, Victoria, Houston, Three Rivers	Future northern end of US 281 overlap; future north end of I-69C
1.000 mi = 1.609 km; 1.000 km = 0.621 mi: Concurrency terminus; Incomplete access; Unopened
