= Santa Maria High School (Texas) =

Location
- 11224 Old Military Road; Santa Maria, Texas 78592; United States; 26.076515°N 97.844517°W

Information
- Type: Public high school
- School district: Santa Maria Independent School District
- Principal: Cindy Taylor
- Teaching staff: 18.48 (FTE)
- Grades: 9-12
- Enrollment: 176 (2023-2024)
- Student to teacher ratio: 9.52
- Colors: Gold, white, and blue
- Athletics conference: UIL Class 2A
- Team name: Cougars
- Website: Official website

Santa Maria High School (SMHS) is a public high school located in Santa Maria, Texas, United States. It is the sole high school in the Santa Maria Independent School District and is classified as a 2A school by the UIL. For the 2024-2025 school year, the school was given a "B" by the Texas Education Agency.

== Athletics ==
The Santa Maria Cougars compete in the following sports:

- Basketball
- Cross country
- Football
- Golf
- Tennis
- Track and field
- Volleyball
