= U.S. Route 281 in Texas =

Section of U.S. Highway in Texas, United States

U.S. Highway 281
- US 281 highlighted in red

Route information
- Maintained by TxDOT
- Length: 580.608 mi (Note: Length does not account for concurrencies along Interstate Highways and U.S. Highways with lower numbers) (934.398 km)
- Existed: 1935–present

Major junctions
- South end: Bus. US 77 / SH 48 at Brownsville, TX
- I-2 / US 83 in Pharr; I-69C from Pharr to Edinburg; Future I-69W / US 59 in George West; I-37 in Three Rivers; I-10 / US 87 / US 90 in San Antonio; I-35 in San Antonio; I-20 north of Stephenville; I-44 / US 82 / US 277 / US 287 in Wichita Falls
- North end: I-44 / US 277 / US 281 at Texas-Oklahoma state line in Burkburnett

Location
- Country: United States
- State: Texas
- Counties: Cameron, Hidalgo, Brooks, Jim Wells, Live Oak, Atascosa, Bexar, Comal, Blanco, Burnet, Lampasas, Coryell, Hamilton, Erath, Palo Pinto, Jack, Archer, Wichita

Highway system
- United States Numbered Highway System; List; Special; Divided; Highways in Texas; Interstate; US; State; Former; Toll; Loops; Spurs; FM/RM; Park; Rec

U.S. Route 281 (US 281) is a United States Numbered Highway that runs from Brownsville near the Mexican border in the Rio Grande Valley to the Canadian border near Dunseith, North Dakota. In the state of Texas, the highway is a major south–north corridor, connecting Brownsville to the Oklahoma state line at the Red River in Burkburnett. Several segments of U.S. 281 are concurrent with Interstate routes, including I-69C in the Rio Grande Valley, I-37 in San Antonio, and I-44 north of Wichita Falls.

== Route description ==
US 281 has two signed segments near its southern terminus in the Rio Grande Valley, both of which are signed west–east. The eastern segment, considered mainline US 281 by TxDOT, begins in Brownsville at an intersection with Business US 77 and SH 48 about 2 miles (3.2 km) from the Mexico border, and travels west through several communities along the border to Pharr. The western segment, officially listed as a spur connection by TxDOT and often labeled on maps as US 281 Spur, begins just north of the McAllen–Hidalgo–Reynosa International Bridge in Hidalgo and travels north along International Boulevard before turning east onto Coma Avenue and entering Pharr. The two segments (along with Spur 600, which provides access to the Pharr–Reynosa International Bridge) meet at Cage Boulevard, where signage changes to south–north, and the highway turns to the north. North of the interchange with I-2, US 281 is concurrent with I-69C to that route's northern terminus (as of December 2015) in Edinburg. US 281 travels through small towns and sparsely populated areas, alternating between a divided highway and a main street and passing through a Border Patrol checkpoint south of Falfurrias, until joining I-37 north of Three Rivers. The two routes split south of Pleasanton and separately travel northward to San Antonio.

In San Antonio, US 281 overlaps I-410 on the south side of the city until another interchange with I-37. US 281 and I-37 then overlap north into Downtown San Antonio until I-37 ends at I-35. US 281 continues north from Downtown San Antonio as the McAllister Freeway, intersecting I-410 again at a stack interchange in Uptown San Antonio, with access to the San Antonio International Airport. The freeway ends several miles north of Loop 1604 at the Comal County line. In Central Texas, it serves as the main street of Blanco before beginning a concurrency with US 290 south of Johnson City. As US 290 continues toward Austin, US 281 and US 290 provide a scenic and less congested alternative to I-35 between San Antonio and Austin. The two routes split in the city, with US 281 continuing toward Marble Falls, Burnet, and Lampasas.

North of Stephenville, US 281 crosses I-20 and continues through North Central Texas, passing through Mineral Wells and Jacksboro. Upon reaching Wichita Falls, US 281 becomes a freeway. It begins a concurrency with I-44 at that route's western terminus, and the two routes travel north, crossing the Red River into Oklahoma near Burkburnett.

== History ==
A project to construct a stack interchange at I-410 (the "San Antonio Web") was completed June 9, 2008; formerly there was no direct access between the two freeways and surface streets were required to travel between the freeways. The reason for this initial lack of direct interchange was due to litigation filed in the late 1960s against the Texas Highway Department over the highway's original construction alignment through portions of Brackenridge Park and Olmos Park that were alleged to be in violation of several Federal laws, ultimately including NEPA. As a result of the Supreme Court decision in a more advanced and very similar case involving the proposed construction of I-40 through Overton Park in Memphis, Tennessee which upheld and affirmed the plaintiffs in that circumstance and precluded that highway's construction through the parkland with Federal funding, the Texas Highway Department chose instead to construct the McAlister Freeway entirely with State funding using a modified design that would increase curvature but limit encroachment into and noise impact on the Sunken Gardens area within Brackenridge Park. Funding of various highway projects from around Texas was re-allocated to the McAlister Freeway project, which was initially completed with only the indirect interchange via existing surface streets to Loop 410 since it required no Federal funding or approval and the Loop 410 overpass of that location where the McAlister Freeway main lanes would pass beneath had already been completed many years earlier.

In 2010, US 281 from Loop 1604 to Bulverde Road in north San Antonio was re-constructed as a superstreet. Groundbreaking was held on March 11, 2010 with construction finishing later that year in September. The re-construction slightly increased travel times but this section of US 281 was still the most congested highway in Bexar County. After nearly two decades of planning an delays, TxDOT upgraded this section of highway from a superstreet to a limited–access freeway, with construction beginning in 2017 and concluding in 2022. Section 1, from Loop 1604 to Stone Oak Parkway, was constructed from 2017 to 2020. Section 2, from Stone Oak Parkway to Borgfeld Drive, was constructed from 2019 to 2022. The estimated cost for the project was $532 million. Ground breaking for the project was held on March 31, 2017 with construction officially beginning on July 17.

The highway was expanded from a two-lane highway to a four-lane divided highway from River Crossing to the Comal-Blanco county line at a cost of $30.5 million.

== Future ==
The section of US 281 from I-2/US 83 in Pharr to George West is steadily being upgraded to an interstate-grade freeway as part of the Interstate 69 expansion, and will be signed as Interstate 69C.

== Major intersections ==
All exits are unnumbered.

County	Location	mi	km	Destinations	Notes
Cameron	Brownsville	0.0	0.0	Bus. US 77 (Central Boulevard) / SH 48 east (Boca Chica Boulevard) – Port Brownsville, Port Isabel, Harlingen	Southern terminus; road continues east as SH 48 (Boca Chica Boulevard)
Cameron	Brownsville	2.0	3.2	FM 802 east (Ruben M. Torres Boulevard)	
Cameron	Brownsville	2.5	4.0	FM 3248 east (Alton Gloor Boulevard)	
Cameron	Brownsville	7.7	12.4	FM 1421 north	
Cameron	Brownsville	9.5	15.3	FM 1732 east – Olmito	
Cameron	Ranchito	10.9	17.5	FM 1577 north (Esparza-Domanski Highway)	
Cameron	La Paloma	13.6	21.9	FM 732 north – San Benito	
Cameron	Los Indios	15.6	25.1	FM 2520 north – San Benito	
Cameron	Los Indios	18.0	29.0	FM 509 – Free Trade International Bridge	
Cameron	Los Indios	19.6	31.5	FM 1479 north (Fred Elizondo Highway) – Rangerville, Harlingen	
Cameron	Bluetown	23.7	38.1	FM 506 north – La Feria	
Cameron	Santa Maria	25.6	41.2	FM 2556 north (Jo-Ed Road)	
Hidalgo		28.9	46.5	FM 491 north – Mercedes	
Hidalgo	Progreso–Progreso Lakes line	32.0	51.5	FM 1015 – Progreso–Nuevo Progreso International Bridge	
Hidalgo	Progreso	32.4	52.1	FM Bus. 1015 north	
Hidalgo	Progreso	34.6	55.7	FM 88 north (Ruben Hinojosa Highway) – Weslaco	
Hidalgo		38.9	62.6	FM 493 – Donna, Donna–Río Bravo International Bridge	
Hidalgo		43.9	70.7	FM 907 north – Alamo	
Hidalgo	San Juan	45.4	73.1	FM 2557 north – San Juan	
Hidalgo	San Juan	45.8– 46.9	73.7– 75.5	SH 365 Toll north – Pharr San Juan Road	Proposed interchange; future southern terminus of SH 365 Toll
Hidalgo	Pharr	47.5	76.4	Spur 241 west (West Military Highway) / Spur 600 south – Hidalgo, Pharr–Reynosa International Bridge	Interchange
Hidalgo	Pharr	49.7	80.0	FM 3072 (Dicker Road)	
Hidalgo	Pharr	51.0	82.1	SH 365 Toll	Proposed
Hidalgo	Pharr	54.8	88.2	Bus. US 83 – McAllen, Harlingen	
Hidalgo	Pharr	55.6	89.5	I-2 / US 83 – McAllen, Harlingen	
Hidalgo	Pharr	55.9	90.0	SH 495 (Ferguson Avenue)	
Hidalgo	Pharr	56.3	90.6	I-2 / US 83 – McAllen, Harlingen I-69C begins	South end of I-69C overlap; southbound exit and northbound entrance; I-2 exit 146; I-69C exits 1A-B
Hidalgo	see I-69C				
Hidalgo	Edinburg	72.8	117.2	FM 490 I-69C ends	Interchange; current north end of I-69C overlap
Hidalgo	Linn	80.2	129.1	SH 186 / FM 1017	Interchange
Brooks	Rachal	103.9	167.2	FM 755 west – La Gloria, Rio Grande City	Interchange
Brooks		105.6	169.9	Bus. US 281 north – Encino	
Brooks		108.4	174.5	Bus. US 281 south – Encino	
Brooks		124.7	200.7	FM 3066	interchange; south end of freeway
Brooks	Falfurrias	126.3	203.3	Bus. US 281 north	
Brooks	Falfurrias	127.2	204.7	SH 285 – Falfurrias	
Brooks	Falfurrias	128.0	206.0	Bus. US 281 south	
Brooks		128.7	207.1	FM 1418	interchange; north end of freeway
Jim Wells		133.0	214.0	FM 1538 west	
Jim Wells	Premont	134.7	216.8	Bus. US 281 north / FM 716 – Premont	interchange; south end of freeway; northbound exit and southbound entrance
Jim Wells	Premont	137.4	221.1	NE 8th Street	
Jim Wells	Premont	138.1	222.3	Bus. US 281 south / FM 716 – Premont	interchange; north end of freeway; southbound exit and northbound entrance
Jim Wells		150.2	241.7	SH 141 / FM 2295 – Kingsville, Benavides	Interchange
Jim Wells		152.5	245.4	FM 735 west – Palito Blanco	
Jim Wells	Ben Bolt	157.0	252.7	FM 2508 – Ben Bolt	Interchange
Jim Wells		159.8	257.2	FM 625 west	
Jim Wells		160.4	258.1	Bus. US 281 north / FM 1930 – Alice	Interchange
Jim Wells				CR 129	Interchange under construction
Jim Wells		163.8	263.6	FM 1554	Interchange
Jim Wells		164.8	265.2	SH 44 / SH 359 – Alice, San Diego	Interchange
Jim Wells				CR 116 / CR 117	Interchange under construction
Jim Wells		168.3	270.9	Bus. US 281 south – Alice	Interchange
Jim Wells		172.1	277.0	FM 2044 east – Alfred	
Jim Wells	Midway	184.2	296.4	FM 624 – Orange Grove, Cotulla	Interchange
Live Oak		190.2	306.1	FM 3162 east – Lagarto	
Live Oak	George West	205.4	330.6	US 59 (Future I-69W) – Freer, Laredo, Beeville, Houston	South end of Bus. US 59 overlap; future north end of I-69C overlap
Live Oak	George West	205.9	331.4	Bus. US 59-X north (Houston Street) to I-37 – truck route to US 59 north	North end of Bus. US 59 overlap
Live Oak		207.8	334.4	FM 889 west	
Live Oak		212.8	342.5	FM 1042 west – Simmons City	
Live Oak	Three Rivers	215.9	347.5	SH 72 west (Thornton Street) – Choke Canyon State Park, Calliham, Tilden, Federal Prison	South end of SH 72 overlap
Live Oak	Three Rivers	216.6	348.6	SH 72 east (King David Drive) – Kenedy	North end of SH 72 overlap
Live Oak		220.5	354.9	I-37 south – Corpus Christi	South end of I-37 overlap; US 281 south follows exit 72
see I-37
Atascosa		251.1	404.1	I-37 north – San Antonio	North end of I-37 overlap; northbound exit and southbound entrance; US 281 north follows exit 103
Atascosa		252.3	406.0	Spur 199 east (Leal Road) / Jim Brite Road	
Atascosa	Pleasanton	255.9	411.8	FM 1334 east – Coughran	
Atascosa	Pleasanton	256.2	412.3	SH 97 west – Jourdanton	South end of SH 97 overlap
Atascosa	Pleasanton	257.0	413.6	SH 97 east to I-37 – Floresville	North end of SH 97 overlap
Atascosa	Pleasanton	257.3	414.1	Spur 242 to SH 97 – Poteet, Coastal Bend College	
Atascosa		260.1	418.6	FM 3006 east to I-37	
Atascosa	Leming	264.0	424.9	FM 1470 south – Poteet	
Atascosa	Las Gallinas	267.2	430.0	FM 536 east – Floresville	
Bexar		274.7	442.1	Loop 1604 (Anderson Loop) – Elmendorf, Somerset	Interchange
Bexar		276.2	444.5	FM 2537 west / Martinez-Losoya Road	
Bexar	San Antonio	280.7	451.7	FM 1937 south / Del Lago Parkway – Losoya	
Bexar	San Antonio	281.8	453.5	I-410 west / SH 130 south / Spur 536 north (Roosevelt Avenue) – Stinson Airport	
Bexar	San Antonio	283.0	455.4	Espada Road – San Antonio Missions National Historical Park	interchange
Bexar	San Antonio	283.2	455.8	I-410 west / SH 130 south	South end of I-410 / SH 130 overlap; southbound exit and northbound entrance; US 281 south follows exit 44
Bexar	San Antonio	284.3	457.5	Spur 122 (South Presa Street) / Southton Road	I-410 exit 42
Bexar	San Antonio	285.3	459.1	I-37 south / I-410 north / SH 130 north to US 181 south – Corpus Christi, Floresville	North end of I-410 / SH 130 overlap; south end of I-37 overlap; US 281 north follows exit 41; US 281 south follows exit 133
Bexar	San Antonio	see I-37			
Bexar	San Antonio	294.5	474.0	I-35 – Laredo, Austin I-37 ends	North end of I-37 overlap; I-37 exits 142A (north) and 142B (south); I-35 exits 158A-B
Bexar	San Antonio	295.4	475.4	Josephine Street / Grayson Street	Southbound exit and northbound entrance
Bexar	San Antonio	295.9	476.2	St. Mary's Street / Mulberry Avenue / Stadium Drive	
Bexar	San Antonio	297.0	478.0	Hildebrand Avenue	
Bexar	San Antonio	298.8	480.9	Basse Road	Northbound exit and southbound entrance
Bexar	San Antonio	299.5	482.0	Jones-Maltsberger Road	
Bexar	San Antonio	300.3	483.3	Sunset Road	Southbound exit only
Bexar	San Antonio	300.4	483.4	I-410	I-410 exit 21A
Bexar	San Antonio	300.7	483.9	Airport Boulevard	Northbound exit and southbound entrance
Bexar	San Antonio	301.0	484.4	San Antonio International Airport Terminals	
Bexar	San Antonio	301.3	484.9	Jones-Maltsberger Road / Isom Road	
Bexar	San Antonio	302.9	487.5	San Pedro Avenue	Southbound exit and northbound entrance; former Spur 537
Bexar	San Antonio	302.2	486.3	Nakoma Drive	no direct southbound exit (signed at Wurzbach Parkway)
Bexar	San Antonio	303.4	488.3	PA 1502 (Wurzbach Parkway)	signed with Nakoma Drive southbound; additional signage southbound for Sandau Road and Rhapsody Drive
Bexar	San Antonio	304.0	489.2	Bitters Road	
Bexar	San Antonio	304.7	490.4	Oak Shadows Drive / Winding Way Drive	no direct southbound exit (signed at Brook Hollow Boulevard)
Bexar	San Antonio	305.4	491.5	Brook Hollow Boulevard	
Bexar	San Antonio	305.8	492.1	Thousand Oaks Drive / Mecca Drive	No direct southbound exit (signed at Donella Drive)
Bexar	San Antonio	306.7	493.6	Donella Drive	
Bexar	San Antonio	307.3	494.6	Loop 1604 / Frontage Road	
Bexar	San Antonio	307.9	495.5	Sonterra Boulevard / Redland Road / Encino Rio Road	access to North Central Baptist Hospital and Methodist Stone Oak Hospital; Encino Rio Road signed at Evans Road southbound
Bexar	San Antonio	309.5	498.1	Evans Road	
Bexar	San Antonio			VIA Stone Oak Park & Ride	HOV only
Bexar	San Antonio	310.0	498.9	Stone Oak Parkway / TPC Parkway	access to North Central Baptist Hospital and Methodist Stone Oak Hospital
Bexar	San Antonio	310.9	500.3	Marshall Road	
Bexar	San Antonio			Overlook Parkway / Wilderness Oak	Access to Baptist Neighborhood Hospital
Bexar	San Antonio			Bulverde Road	
Bexar	San Antonio			Borgfeld Drive	Interchange; temporary north end of freeway
Comal	Bulverde	317.3	510.6	FM 1863 – Bulverde	Interchange
Comal	Bulverde			Mustang Vista / Casey Road / Johnson Way	Proposed interchange
Comal	Bulverde	321.2	516.9	SH 46 – Boerne, New Braunfels	Interchange
Comal	Spring Branch	327.0	526.3	FM 311 east – Smithson Valley	Future interchange
Comal		331.3	533.2	FM 306 east – Canyon Lake North	Future interchange; future northern end of freeway
Blanco		334.0	537.5	RM 473 west – Kendalia	South end of RM 473 overlap
Blanco	Twin Sisters	335.8	540.4	RM 473 east	North end of RM 473 overlap
Blanco		340.6	548.1	RM 32 east – San Marcos, Canyon Dam	
Blanco		340.9	548.6	Loop 163 north to RM 165 – Wimberley	
Blanco	Blanco	342.2	550.7	PR 23 – Blanco State Park	interchange
Blanco	Blanco	342.7	551.5	Loop 163 south / RM 1623 west (4th Street) to RM 165 – Stonewall, Henly, Wimberley	
Blanco		350.4	563.9	US 290 east – Austin	South end of US 290 overlap
Blanco	Johnson City	355.8	572.6	RM 2766 east – Pedernales Falls State Park	
Blanco	Johnson City	356.0	572.9	US 290 west – Fredericksburg, Lyndon B. Johnson National Historical Park	North end of US 290 overlap
Blanco	Johnson City	356.8	574.2	Spur 356 south – Lyndon B. Johnson National Historical Park	
Blanco		358.8	577.4	RM 1323 west – Sandy	
Blanco	Round Mountain	367.3	591.1	RM 962 east – Cypress Mill	South end of RM 962 overlap
Blanco	Round Mountain	367.5	591.4	RM 962 west – Llano	North end of RM 962 overlap
Burnet	Marble Falls	373.3	600.8	SH 71 – Llano, Austin	Interchange; access to Baylor Scott & White Medical Center - Marble Falls
Burnet	Marble Falls	376.1	605.3	RM 2147 east	South end of RM 2147 overlap
Burnet	Marble Falls	377.7	607.8	RM 2147 west – Wirtz Dam, Horseshoe Bay, Lake LBJ	North end of RM 2147 overlap
Burnet	Marble Falls			Bridge over Lake Marble Falls (Colorado River)	
Burnet	Marble Falls	378.8	609.6	RM 1431 – Granite Shoals, Kingsland, Lago Vista, Cedar Park	
Burnet		383.2	616.7	RM 1855 west – Fairland	
Burnet	Burnet	386.7	622.3	PR 4 west – Longhorn Cavern State Park, Inks Lake State Park, Inks Dam National Fish Hatchery	
Burnet	Burnet	391.7	630.4	SH 29 – Buchanan Dam, Llano, Georgetown	
Burnet	Burnet	392.4	631.5	RM 963 east – Watson, Oakalla	
Burnet		401.2	645.7	RM 2340 east – Lake Victor	
Lampasas	Lampasas	413.0	664.7	Bus. US 281 north	
Lampasas	Lampasas	413.2	665.0	US 183 south (Key Avenue) / US 190 east (Central Texas Expressway) – Fort Hood, Belton, Austin	South end of US 183 / US 190 overlap
Lampasas	Lampasas	413.5	665.5	Bus. US 281 south	
Lampasas	Lampasas	413.7	665.8	Loop 257 east (4th Street) – Lampasas Downtown Historic District	
Lampasas	Lampasas	414.0	666.3	FM 580 west (North Avenue) – Colorado Bend State Park	South end of FM 580 overlap
Lampasas	Lampasas	414.6	667.2	FM 580 east (East Avenue J)	North end of FM 580 overlap
Lampasas		415.2	668.2	US 183 north / US 190 west – Goldthwaite, Brownwood, San Saba, Lometa	North end of US 183 / US 190 overlap
Lampasas		425.2	684.3	FM 1690 north	
Lampasas		429.9	691.9	FM 581 west – Lometa	South end of FM 581 overlap
Lampasas	Adamsville	430.5	692.8	FM 581 east	North end of FM 581 overlap
Coryell	No major junctions				
Hamilton	Evant	443.2	713.3	US 84 – Gatesville, Goldthwaite	Interchange
Hamilton		451.3	726.3	FM 221 west – Shive	
Hamilton	Hamilton	459.3	739.2	SH 22 east / SH 36 (Main Street) – Comanche, Gatesville, Meridian	
Hamilton	Hamilton	460.1	740.5	FM 2905 east	
Hamilton	Olin	471.3	758.5	FM 219 – Dublin, Cranfills Gap	
Hamilton		478.8	770.6	FM 1744 south – Carlton	
Hamilton		479.2	771.2	FM 1602 south – Fairy, Jonesboro	
Hamilton	Hico	480.1	772.6	SH 6 south (2nd Street) to SH 220 – Meridian, Downtown Historic District	South end of SH 6 overlap
Erath		484.5	779.7	SH 6 north – Dublin, Eastland	North end of SH 6 overlap
Erath		486.0	782.1	FM 1824 east – Duffau	
Erath		492.4	792.4	FM 913 east – Selden	
Erath		497.8	801.1	SH 108 north – Stephenville	
Erath	Stephenville	498.5	802.3	US 67 – Dublin, Glen Rose	
Erath	Stephenville	498.8	802.7	US 377 – Dublin, Granbury	
Erath	Stephenville	499.1	803.2	FM 205 east	
Erath	Stephenville	499.6	804.0	Bus. US 377 – Stephenville, Fort Worth	
Erath	Stephenville	500.8	806.0	FM 8 west – Tarleton Agricultural Center	
Erath		501.8	807.6	FM 3025 west	
Erath	Morgan Mill	511.0	822.4	FM 1188 / FM 1189 north – Lipan	
Erath		519.5	836.1	FM 2803 north – Patillo	
Palo Pinto		521.1	838.6	FM 4 – Santo, Lipan	
Palo Pinto		527.0	848.1	I-20 – Abilene, Fort Worth	I-20 exit 386
Palo Pinto		527.3	848.6	FM 2201 west – Santo	
Palo Pinto		528.1	849.9	FM 129 west – Brazos	
Palo Pinto		537.6	865.2	FM 1195 east – Lake Mineral Wells State Park, Municipal Airport	
Palo Pinto		539.6	868.4	FM 2256 south	
Palo Pinto	Mineral Wells	541.3	871.1	US 180 east (South 1st Street)	One-way couplet
Palo Pinto	Mineral Wells	541.4	871.3	US 180 west (Hubbard Street)	One-way couplet
Palo Pinto	Mineral Wells	542.5	873.1	FM 3027 east (Northeast 23rd Street)	South end of FM 3027 overlap
Palo Pinto	Mineral Wells	543.1	874.0	FM 3027 west – Union Hill	North end of FM 3027 overlap
Palo Pinto		544.8	876.8	FM 1821 east – Weatherford, Lake Mineral Wells State Park	
Palo Pinto		548.8	883.2	FM 2270 west	
Palo Pinto	Peadenville	549.5	884.3	SH 254 west / FM 1885 east – Graford, Possum Kingdom Lake, Weatherford	
Palo Pinto		551.8	888.0	FM 52 – Oran, Whitt	
Jack	Perrin	557.6	897.4	FM 2210 – Gibtown	
Jack		564.8	909.0	SH 199 east – Fort Worth	south end of SH 199 overlap
Jack		568.2	914.4	FM 3324 south	
Jack		569.8	917.0	US 380 east / SH 114 east – Runaway Bay, Bridgeport, Dallas	South end of US 380 / SH 114 overlap
Jack	Jacksboro	571.4	919.6	PR 61 – Fort Richardson State Park	
Jack	Jacksboro	572.3	921.0	US 380 west / SH 59 north (Belknap Street)	North end of US 380 / SH 199 overlap
Jack	Jacksboro	572.9	922.0	FM 3344 north (Post Oak Road)	
Jack	Jacksboro	573.0	922.2	SH 148 north – Henrietta	
Jack		579.6	932.8	SH 114 west – Olney	North end of SH 114 overlap
Jack		588.4	946.9	FM 1191 south – Jermyn	
Jack		589.7	949.0	FM 2190 east – Squaw Mountain	
Jack		592.6	953.7	Loop 187 north – Antelope	
Jack		595.4	958.2	Loop 187 south – Antelope	
Archer		599.2	964.3	SH 16 south – Graham	
Archer		603.2	970.8	FM 2581 north	
Archer	Windthorst	605.9	975.1	SH 25 north / FM 174 east – Archer City, Bowie	
Archer	Scotland	611.9	984.8	FM 172 – Bluegrove	
Archer		622.5	1,001.8	FM 1954 – Holliday, Lake Arrowhead, Lake Arrowhead State Park	
Wichita	Wichita Falls	624.8	1,005.5	Loop 473 / Rathgeber Road	interchange; south end of freeway
Wichita	Wichita Falls	625.5	1,006.6	FM 369 west (Southwest Parkway) / SH 79 south – Archer City	South end of SH 79 overlap; no direct southbound entrance
Wichita	Wichita Falls	626.5	1,008.3	Hatton Road	
Wichita	Wichita Falls	627.1	1,009.2	Midwestern Parkway – Midwestern State University	
Wichita	Wichita Falls	627.6	1,010.0	US 82 east / US 287 south / SH 79 north – Texarkana, Fort Worth	North end of SH 79 overlap; south end of US 82 / US 287 overlap
Wichita	Wichita Falls	628.2	1,011.0	Loop 473 (Old Jacksboro Highway) / Spur 447 / Galveston Street	
Wichita	Wichita Falls	628.7	1,011.8	US 82 west / US 277 south – Lubbock, Abilene	North end of US 82 overlap; south end of US 277 overlap
Wichita	Wichita Falls	629.2	1,012.6	Broad Street – Business District	northbound exit and southbound entrance
Wichita	Wichita Falls	630.0	1,013.9	6th Street – MPEC	no direct southbound exit
Wichita	overlap; see I-44				
Wichita		645.1	1,038.2	I-44 east / US 277 north / US 281 north – Lawton	Oklahoma state line (bridge over the Red River)
1.000 mi = 1.609 km; 1.000 km = 0.621 mi: Concurrency terminus; HOV only; Incomplete access

== Special routes ==
=== Hidalgo spur route ===
Spur U.S. Highway 281
- Location: Hidalgo–Pharr
- Length: 4.9 mi (7.9 km)

Spur US Route 281 began at the McAllen–Hidalgo–Reynosa International Bridge in Hidalgo, ran north along International Boulevard, then turned east along Military Highway before it ended at the main route of US 281 in Pharr, and now it's Spur 241.

Junction list

The entire route is in Hidalgo County.

Location	mi	km	Destinations	Notes
Hidalgo	0.0	0.0	Bridge Street	Western terminus; road continued as South International Boulevard to the McAllen–Hidalgo–Reynosa International Bridge
Hidalgo	0.7	1.1	Spur 115 (North International Boulevard) – McAllen	
Hidalgo	1.2	1.9	SH 336 – McAllen	Interchange
	3.5	5.6	FM 2061 (Jackson Road) – McAllen	
Pharr	4.9	7.9	US 281 (Military Highway) / Spur 600 (Cage Boulevard) – Edinburg, Harlingen, Pharr–Reynosa International Bridge	Eastern terminus; interchange
1.000 mi = 1.609 km; 1.000 km = 0.621 mi

=== Edinburg business route ===
Business U.S. Highway 281
- Location: Edinburg
- Length: 7.228 mi (11.632 km)
- Existed: June 21, 1990–present

Bus. US 281-W is a business route of US 281 that serves the central business district of Edinburg where it is known locally as Closner Boulevard. The highway was created in 1990 as a re-designation of Loop 113.

Junction list

The entire route is in Hidalgo County.

Location	mi	km	Destinations	Notes
Pharr–Edinburg line	0.0	0.0	I-69C / US 281 / Owassa Road	I-69C exit 2
Edinburg	4.0	6.4	SH 107 west (Cano Street)	South end of SH 107 overlap
Edinburg	4.1	6.6	SH 107 east (University Drive)	North end of SH 107 overlap
Edinburg	7.2	11.6	I-69C / US 281	I-69C exit 10
1.000 mi = 1.609 km; 1.000 km = 0.621 mi: Concurrency terminus

=== Encino business route ===
Business U.S. Highway 281
- Location: Encino
- Length: 2.867 mi (4.614 km)
- Existed: August 26, 1993–present

Bus. US 281-U is from US 281 north of Encino southward to US 281 south of Encino, a distance of approximately 2.8 miles.

=== Falfurrias business route ===
Business U.S. Highway 281
- Location: Falfurrias
- Length: 1.841 mi (2.963 km)
- Existed: June 24, 2004–present

Bus. US 281-T is from 15th St, north of SH 285, to Taylor Rd, south of SH 285, a distance of approximately 1.84 miles.

=== Alice business route ===
Business U.S. Highway 281
- Location: Alice
- Length: 7.911 mi (12.732 km)
- Existed: August 26, 1999–present

Bus. US 281-R is from the new location of US 281, approximately 1.0 mile north of FM 3376, southward to US 281 at FM 625, a distance of approximately 7.8 miles.

=== Lampasas business route ===
Business U.S. Highway 281
- Location: Lampasas
- Length: 0.400 mi (644 m)
- Existed: July 12, 2022–present

Bus. US 281-J is from a segment of US 281 that was redesignated on the state highway system as Bus. US 281-J from the intersection of US 183 southwestward to the intersection of US 190, a distance of approximately 0.4 miles. Bus. US 281-J was designated over the old section of US 281 through Hancock Springs Park, where the highway crossed over Sulphur Creek on a two-lane bridge.

=== Whitsett–Campbellton loop ===
Alternate U.S. Highway 281
- Location: Whitsett–Campbellton
- Length: 16.719 mi (26.907 km)
- Existed: June 29, 1982–present

Alternate U.S. Route 281 is an alternate routing of US 281 that serves the small communities of Whitsett and Campbellton. The highway was designated in 1982 when the main highway was re-routed east along I-37.

=== Lampasas truck route ===
Truck U.S. Highway 281
- Location: Lampasas
- Length: 0.6 mi (970 m)

Truck U.S. Route 281 is a truck route of US 281 located in Lampasas.

Truck US 281 begins at the intersection of US 281 and E. E. Ohnmeiss Drive near Hancock Springs Park. The highway travels for 0.2 miles (0.32 km) east along E. E. Ohnmeiss Drive before reaching an intersection with US 183 (Key Avenue) / US 190 (Central Texas Expressway). Truck US 281 then turns north onto Key Avenue, running concurrent with US 183 and US 190. After running for 0.4 miles (0.64 km) along Key Avenue, the highways then intersect the main route of US 281, which is the northern terminus of Truck US 281.

The truck route provides a more direct routing to US 183 south and US 190 east over the main US 281. Truck US 281 also provides a wider crossing over the Sulphur Creek, with the Key Avenue bridge having five lanes (two travel lanes in each direction plus a bi-directional center lane), whereas the older crossing on the original US 281 is only two lanes.

Junction list

The entire route is in Lampasas, Lampasas County.

mi	km	Destinations	Notes
0.0	0.0	US 281 – Burnet	
0.2	0.32	US 183 south (Key Avenue) / US 190 east (Central Texas Highway) – Fort Cavazos, Killeen, Belton	South end of US 183 / US 190 overlap
0.6	0.97	US 183 north / US 190 west / US 281	Access to AdventHealth Rollins Brook
1.000 mi = 1.609 km; 1.000 km = 0.621 mi

=== Wichita Falls business loop ===
State Highway Loop 473
- Location: Wichita Falls
- Length: 4.367 mi (7.028 km)
- Existed: January 31, 1969–present

== See also ==
- List of U.S. Highways in Texas
- List of highways numbered 281

== Notes ==
U.S. Route 281
Previous state: Terminus	Texas	Next state: Oklahoma
