= Iglesia Antigua, Texas =

- Census-designated place
- Location within the state of Texas
- Coordinates: 26°4′27″N 97°50′14″W
- Country: United States
- State: Texas
- County: Cameron

Area
  - Total: 2.2 sq mi (5.6 km^{2})
  - Land: 2.1 sq mi (5.4 km^{2})
  - Water: 0.077 sq mi (0.2 km^{2})
- Elevation: 65 ft (20 m)

Population (2020)
  - Total: 415
  - Density: 199/sq mi (76.7/km^{2})
- Time zone: UTC-6 (Central (CST))
  - Summer (DST): UTC-5 (CDT)
- FIPS code: 48-35754

Iglesia Antigua is a census-designated place (CDP) in Cameron County, in the U.S. state of Texas. As of the 2020 census, Iglesia Antigua had a population of 415. Prior to the 2010 census, the community was part of the Bluetown-Iglesia Antigua CDP. It is part of the Brownsville–Harlingen Metropolitan Statistical Area.

== Geography ==
Iglesia Antigua is in southwestern Cameron County, bordered to the east by Bluetown. To the west is Santa Maria, and to the south is the Rio Grande, which forms the Mexico–United States border. U.S. Route 281 passes through the community, leading southeast 28 miles (45 km) to Brownsville and west 27 miles (43 km) to Hidalgo.

According to the United States Census Bureau, the Iglesia Antigua CDP has a total area of 2.2 square miles (5.6 km^{2}), of which 2.1 square miles (5.4 km^{2}) is land and 0.08 square miles (0.2 km^{2}), or 3.96%, is water.

== Demographics ==
Historical population
Census	Pop.	Note	%±
2010	413		—
2020	415		0.5%
U.S. Decennial Census; 1850–1900 1910; 1920 1930 1940; 1950 1960 1970; 1980 1990 2000; 2010 2020

Iglesia Antigua first appeared as a census designated place in the 2010 U.S. census after the Bluetown-Iglesia Antigua CDP was split into the Bluetown and Bluetown CDPs.

=== 2020 census ===
Iglesia Antigua CDP, Texas – Racial and ethnic composition Note: the US Census treats Hispanic/Latino as an ethnic category. This table excludes Latinos from the racial categories and assigns them to a separate category. Hispanics/Latinos may be of any race.
Race / Ethnicity (NH = Non-Hispanic)	Pop 2010	Pop 2020	% 2010	% 2020
White alone (NH)	20	8	4.84%	1.93%
Black or African American alone (NH)	1	0	0.24%	0.00%
Native American or Alaska Native alone (NH)	0	0	0.00%	0.00%
Asian alone (NH)	0	0	0.00%	0.00%
Native Hawaiian or Pacific Islander alone (NH)	0	0	0.00%	0.00%
Other race alone (NH)	0	0	0.00%	0.00%
Mixed race or Multiracial (NH)	2	1	0.48%	0.24%
Hispanic or Latino (any race)	390	406	94.43%	97.83%
Total	413	415	100.00%	100.00%
