= Bluetown-Iglesia Antigua, Texas =

- Former CDP
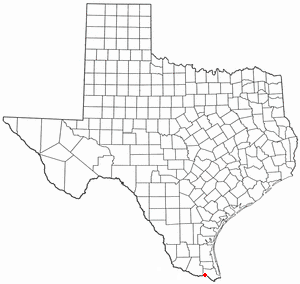
- Location of Bluetown-Iglesia Antigua, Texas

- Coordinates: 26°4′31″N 97°49′30″W
- Country: United States
- State: Texas
- County: Cameron

Area
  - Total: 5.1 sq mi (13.3 km^{2})
  - Land: 5.1 sq mi (13.2 km^{2})
  - Water: 0.039 sq mi (0.1 km^{2})

Population (2000)
  - Total: 692
  - Density: 136/sq mi (52.5/km^{2})
- Time zone: UTC-6 (Central (CST))
  - Summer (DST): UTC-5 (CDT)
- FIPS code: 48-08914

Bluetown-Iglesia Antigua was a census-designated place (CDP) in Cameron County, Texas, United States. The population was 692 at the 2000 census. For the 2010 census the area was split into two CDPs, Bluetown and Iglesia Antigua. The communities are part of the Brownsville–Harlingen Metropolitan Statistical Area.

== Geography ==
The Bluetown-Iglesia Antigua CDP was located at 26°4′31″N 97°49′30″W (26.075355, -97.824886).

According to the United States Census Bureau, the CDP had a total area of 5.1 square miles (13 km^{2}), of which 5.1 square miles (13 km^{2}) was land and 0.1 square miles (0.26 km^{2}), or 1.17%, was water.

== Demographics ==
Historical population
Census	Pop.	Note	%±
2000	692		—
U.S. Decennial Census; 1850–1900 1910; 1920 1930 1940; 1950 1960 1970; 1980 1990 2000; 2010

Bluetown-Iglesia Antigua first appeared as a census designated place in the 2000 U.S. census. Prior to the 2010 U.S. census it was split into the Bluetown and Iglesia Antigua CDPs.

=== 2000 census ===
Bluetown-Iglesia Antigua CDP, Texas – Racial and ethnic composition Note: the US Census treats Hispanic/Latino as an ethnic category. This table excludes Latinos from the racial categories and assigns them to a separate category. Hispanics/Latinos may be of any race.
Race / Ethnicity (NH = Non-Hispanic)	Pop 2000	% 2000
White alone (NH)	40	5.78%
Black or African American alone (NH)	0	0.00%
Native American or Alaska Native alone (NH)	0	0.00%
Asian alone (NH)	1	0.14%
Pacific Islander alone (NH)	0	0.00%
Other race alone (NH)	2	0.29%
Mixed race or Multiracial (NH)	0	0.00%
Hispanic or Latino (any race)	649	93.79%
Total	692	100.00%

As of the census of 2000, there were 692 people, 163 households, and 149 families residing in the CDP. The population density was 136.1 inhabitants per square mile (52.5/km^{2}). There were 179 housing units at an average density of 35.2 per square mile (13.6/km^{2}). The racial makeup of the CDP was 84.54% White, 0.14% African American, 0.14% Asian, 13.73% from other races, and 1.45% from two or more races. Hispanic or Latino of any race were 93.79% of the population.

There were 163 households, out of which 55.2% had children under the age of 18 living with them, 72.4% were married couples living together, 15.3% had a female householder with no husband present, and 8.0% were non-families. 6.7% of all households were made up of individuals, and 4.9% had someone living alone who was 65 years of age or older. The average household size was 4.25 and the average family size was 4.44.

In the CDP, the population was spread out, with 35.4% under the age of 18, 12.6% from 18 to 24, 24.1% from 25 to 44, 17.3% from 45 to 64, and 10.5% who were 65 years of age or older. The median age was 26 years. For every 100 females, there were 91.7 males. For every 100 females age 18 and over, there were 91.0 males.

The median income for a household in the CDP was $16,957, and the median income for a family was $17,120. Males had a median income of $16,563 versus $14,500 for females. The per capita income for the CDP was $6,960. About 42.7% of families and 47.0% of the population were below the poverty line, including 55.9% of those under age 18 and 38.4% of those age 65 or over.

== Education ==
Bluetown and Iglesia Antigua are served by the Santa Maria Independent School District.

In addition, South Texas Independent School District operates magnet schools that serve the community.
