= Santa Maria Independent School District =

School district in Texas, United States

Address
- 11119 Military Highway 281 Santa Maria, Texas, 78592; United States

District information
- Grades: PK–12
- Schools: 5
- NCES District ID: 4839330

Students and staff
- Students: 540 (2023–2024)
- Teachers: 56.29 (on an FTE basis)
- Student–teacher ratio: 9.59:1

Other information
- Website: www.smisd.net

Santa Maria Independent School District is a public school district based in the community of Santa Maria, Texas, United States.

In addition to Santa Maria, the district serves the communities of Bluetown and Iglesia Antigua.

Santa Maria ISD has three campuses - Santa Maria High School (grades 9-12), Santa Maria Middle (grades 5-8), and Tony Gonzalez Elementary (prekindergarten - grade 4).

As of 2007, the Texas State Energy Conservation Office awards Santa Maria ISD money due to the colonias served by the district.

In 2009, the school district was rated "academically acceptable" by the Texas Education Agency.
