= Morgan Mill Independent School District =

School district in Texas

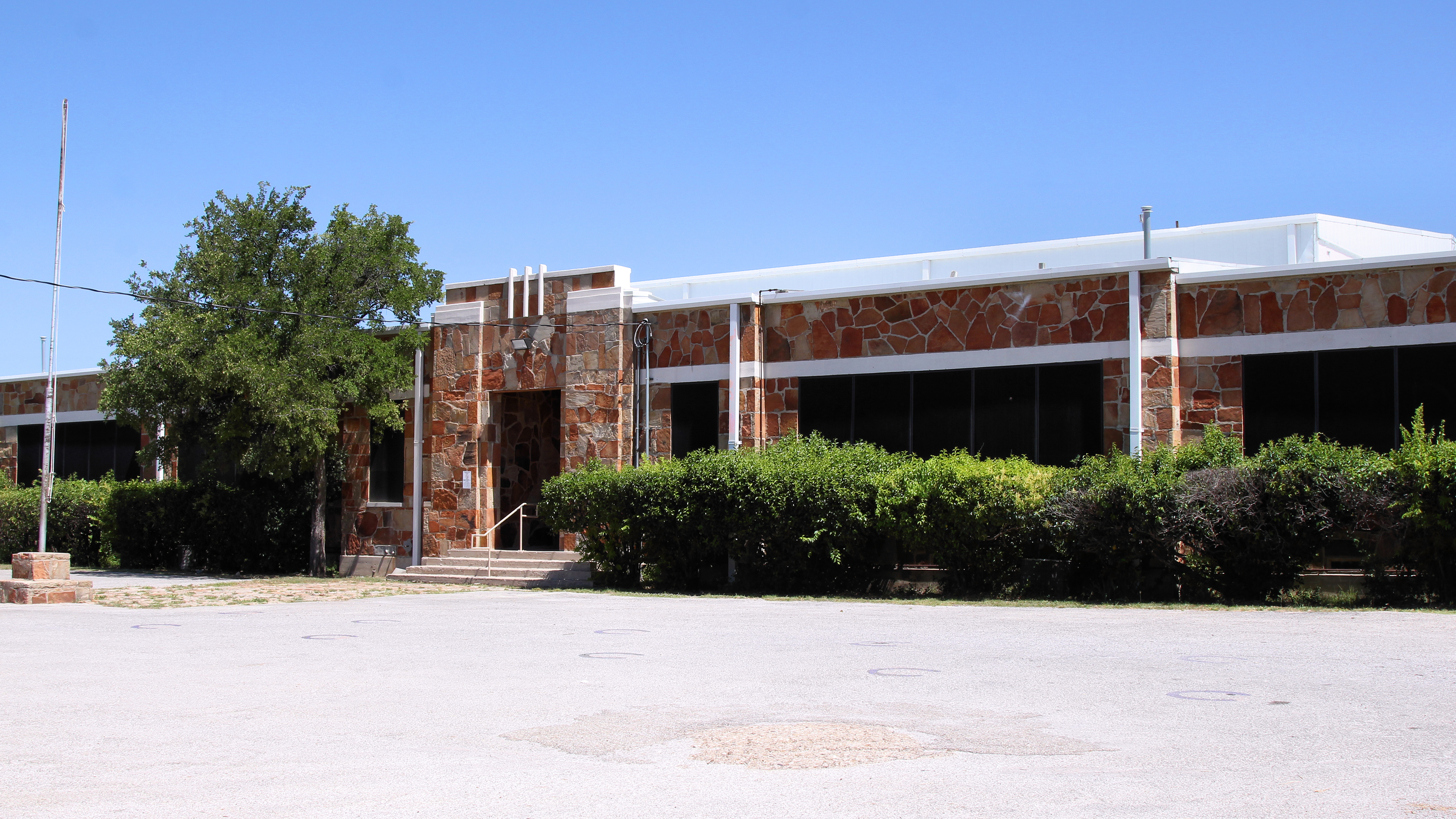

Location
- Morgan Mill, TX ESC Region 11 USA

District information
- Type: Public
- Grades: Pre-K through 10th
- Established: 1879
- Superintendent: Wendy Sanders

Students and staff
- Students: 132
- Teachers: 11
- Staff: 6
- District mascot: Mustangs

Other information
- Website: www.mmisd.us

Morgan Mill Independent School District is a public school district based in the community of Morgan Mill, Texas (USA).

The district has one school - Morgan Mill Elementary - that serves students in grades Pre-K through eighth.

In 2009, the school district was rated "exemplary" by the Texas Education Agency.

However, in 2018 the school district was rated as 'Needs Improvement' by the Texas Education Agency. The following year, in 2019, the school district received a ‘B’ rating from TEA, lifting the ‘Needs Improvement” status.
