= Selden, Texas =

Unincorporated community in Texas, US

Coordinates: 32°08′39″N 98°06′24″W

Selden is an unincorporated community in south central Erath County, Texas, United States. The community is located along Fm-913 between U.S. Routes 67 and 281, approximately 9 miles (14 km) south-southeast of Stephenville. It was named after a man who owned a nearby ranch during the 1850s. Selden was granted a post office in the 1890s, and by 1900, the community had grown to near 100 residents. The post office disbanded in 1915 after significant population fluctuations. The population remained at around a steady 71 from 1980 through the 1990s. Through the 2000s, Selden maintained a Baptist church, a Methodist church, two cemeteries, a community center (formerly the Selden School), and a Volunteer Fire Department. It continues to be a primarily farming, dairy and ranching community.

== Photo gallery ==
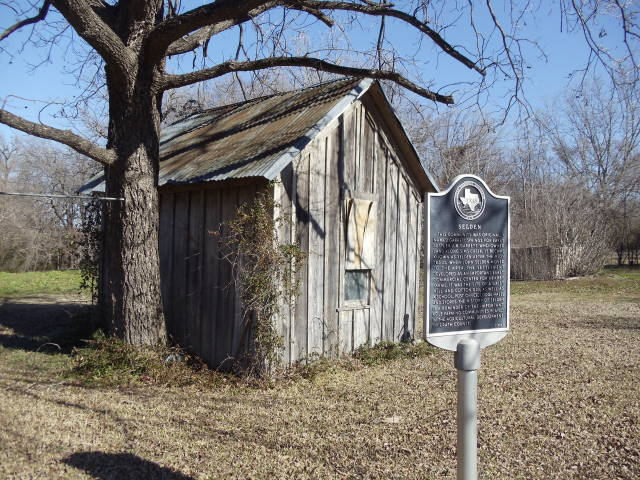
Selden, Texas

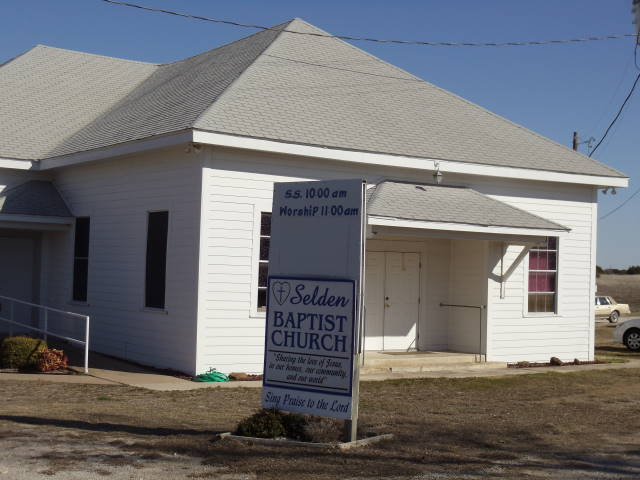
Selden Baptist Church
