= Encino, Texas =

- Census-designated place
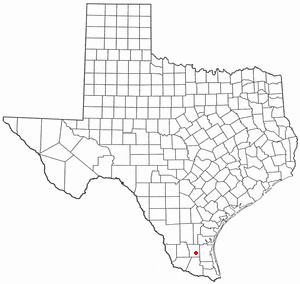
- Location of Encino, Texas

- Coordinates: 26°56′31″N 98°6′38″W
- Country: United States
- State: Texas
- County: Brooks

Area
  - Total: 6.7 sq mi (17.3 km^{2})
  - Land: 6.7 sq mi (17.3 km^{2})
  - Water: 0 sq mi (0.0 km^{2})
- Elevation: 125 ft (38 m)

Population (2020)
  - Total: 109
  - Density: 16.3/sq mi (6.30/km^{2})
- Time zone: UTC-6 (Central (CST))
  - Summer (DST): UTC-5 (CDT)
- ZIP code: 78353
- Area code: 361
- FIPS code: 48-24252
- GNIS feature ID: 1335457

Encino (/ɛnˈsiːnoʊ/ en-SEE-noh) is a census-designated place (CDP) in Brooks County, Texas, United States. It is 18 miles (29 km) south of the county seat of Falfurrias. The population was 109 at the 2020 census. It is the site of a United States Border Patrol interior checkpoint.

== History ==
Encino is located in what once was a Mexican land grant dating back to 1832 called “La Encantada y Encina del Pozo”. The name of the grant, translating in english to “Enchanted Place and Live Oak in a Hole”, was inspired by an oak tree of notable size on the land which cattle would gather under for shade which a depression in the soil. The current community was permanently settled in 1904 when the Texas and New Orleans Railroad extended a line through Encino, and the local post office was built in 1914.

== Geography ==
Encino is located at 26°56′31″N 98°06′38″W. The community is situated along U.S. Highway 281 (Future Interstate 69C), 18 miles (29 km) south of Falfurrias in southern Brooks County.

According to the United States Census Bureau, the CDP has a total area of 6.7 square miles (17.3 km^{2}), all land.

== Demographics ==
Historical population
Census	Pop.	Note	%±
2000	177		—
2010	143		−19.2%
2020	109		−23.8%
U.S. Decennial Census; 1850–1900 1910; 1920 1930 1940; 1950 1960 1970; 1980 1990 2000; 2010 2020

Encino first appeared as a census designated place in the 2000 U.S. census.

=== 2020 census ===
Encino CDP, Texas – Racial and ethnic composition Note: the US Census treats Hispanic/Latino as an ethnic category. This table excludes Latinos from the racial categories and assigns them to a separate category. Hispanics/Latinos may be of any race.
Race / Ethnicity (NH = Non-Hispanic)	Pop 2000	Pop 2010	Pop 2020	% 2000	% 2010	% 2020
White alone (NH)	8	10	9	4.52%	6.99%	8.26%
Black or African American alone (NH)	0	0	0	0.00%	0.00%	0.00%
Native American or Alaska Native alone (NH)	1	0	1	0.56%	0.00%	0.92%
Asian alone (NH)	0	0	0	0.00%	0.00%	0.00%
Native Hawaiian or Pacific Islander alone (NH)	0	0	0	0.00%	0.00%	0.00%
Other race alone (NH)	0	0	0	0.00%	0.00%	0.00%
Mixed race or Multiracial (NH)	0	0	4	0.00%	0.00%	3.67%
Hispanic or Latino (any race)	168	133	95	94.92%	93.01%	87.16%
Total	177	143	109	100.00%	100.00%	100.00%

=== 2000 census ===
As of the census of 2000, there were 177 people, 61 households, and 48 families residing in the CDP. The population density was 26.2 inhabitants per square mile (10.1/km^{2}). There were 92 housing units at an average density of 13.6/sq mi (5.3/km^{2}). The racial makeup of the CDP was 82.49% White, 0.56% Native American, 15.25% from other races, and 1.69% from two or more races. Hispanic or Latino of any race were 94.92% of the population.

There were 61 households, out of which 44.3% had children under the age of 18 living with them, 59.0% were married couples living together, 13.1% had a female householder with no husband present, and 19.7% were non-families. 14.8% of all households were made up of individuals, and 6.6% had someone living alone who was 65 years of age or older. The average household size was 2.90 and the average family size was 3.22.

In the CDP, the population was spread out, with 31.1% under the age of 18, 10.2% from 18 to 24, 24.9% from 25 to 44, 19.2% from 45 to 64, and 14.7% who were 65 years of age or older. The median age was 36 years. For every 100 females, there were 136.0 males. For every 100 females age 18 and over, there were 117.9 males.

The median income for a household in the CDP was $25,667, and the median income for a family was $25,667. Males had a median income of $38,750 versus $26,250 for females. The per capita income for the CDP was $10,546. About 31.5% of families and 22.4% of the population were below the poverty line, including 17.1% of those under the age of eighteen and 17.9% of those 65 or over.

== Education ==
Encino is served by the Brooks County Independent School District.

== See also ==
- Missing in Brooks County
