= Cleburne State Park =

State park in Texas, United States

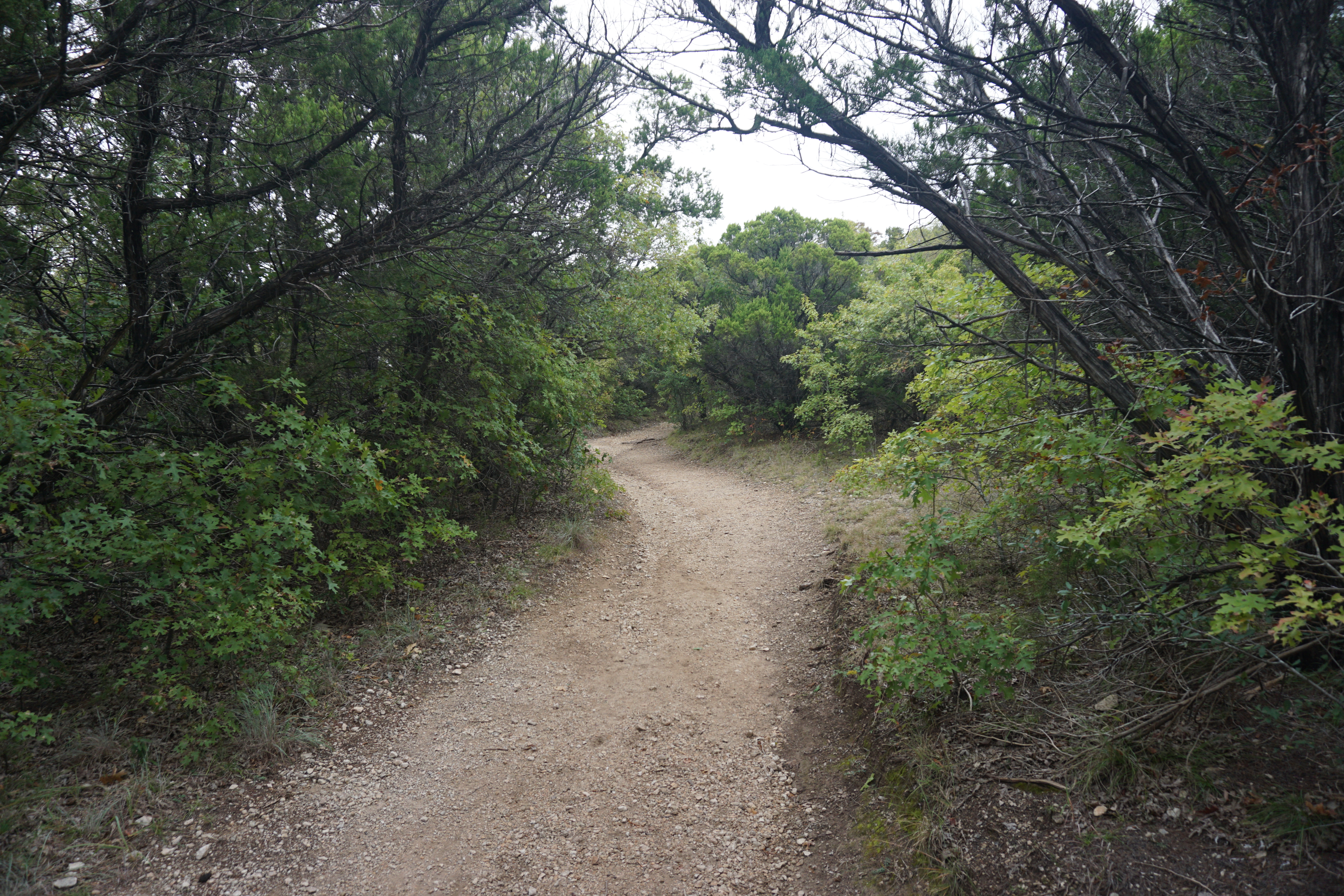
- Spillway Trail at Cleburne State Park

- Location within Texas Location within the United States
- Location: Johnson County, Texas
- Nearest city: Cleburne
- Coordinates: 32°15′9″N 97°32′59″W
- Area: 528 acres (214 ha)
- Established: 1938
- Visitors: 108,212 (in 2025)
- Governing body: Texas Parks and Wildlife Department
- Website: Official site

Cleburne State Park is a 528-acre (2.14 km^{2}) state park in Johnson County, Texas, United States operated by the Texas Parks and Wildlife Department. The park includes the 116-acre (0.47 km^{2}), spring-fed Cedar Lake that was created by construction of an earthen dam by the Civilian Conservation Corps (CCC).

== History ==
Cleburne State Park is named for the nearby town of Cleburne, Texas. The park was established in 1934 when a group of Cleburne businessmen purchased a few hundred acres of land and turned it over to the State Parks Board for park development. From 1935 to 1940 the CCC built out the facilities of the park including the dam, a water tower, a shelter, a residence and nature trails. Earlier Comanche Indians hunted in the area and had a trail passing through.

== Nature ==
=== Plants ===
The park is heavily wooded with eastern redcedar, ashe juniper, Texas live oak, bur oak, and red oaks such as Buckley's oak, Shumard oak and blackjack oak, cedar elm, American elm, honey mesquite, eastern redbud, eastern cottonwood, American sycamore, eastern black walnut, Texas ash and smooth sumac trees.

=== Animals ===
Mammals found in the park include white-tailed deer, wild turkey, Mexican long-nosed armadillo, eastern fox squirrel, striped skunk, bobcat, eastern cottontail, common raccoon, Virginia opossum, coyote and American beaver. The woodlands create the right habitat for the endangered golden-cheeked warbler. Other birds documented are great blue heron, osprey, ladder-backed woodpecker, downy woodpecker and several species of ducks. Species of fish in Cedar Lake include largemouth bass, channel catfish, bluegill, redear sunfish, and crappie.

== Facilities ==
Cleburne State Park has a variety of campsites. Back-in campsites with utilities and shelters accommodate up to 8 people and combination of motor vehicles/trailers. All sites include a picnic table, grill and a campfire ring. Restrooms with hot showers are available nearby all camping areas.

Group Camp consists of a two-group barracks with twin beds and mattresses sleeping a total of 44 people. The dining hall and kitchen seat approximately 70 people and has some cooking equipment. All buildings are heated but no air-conditioning.

Camp Creek flows through the park.

== Activities ==
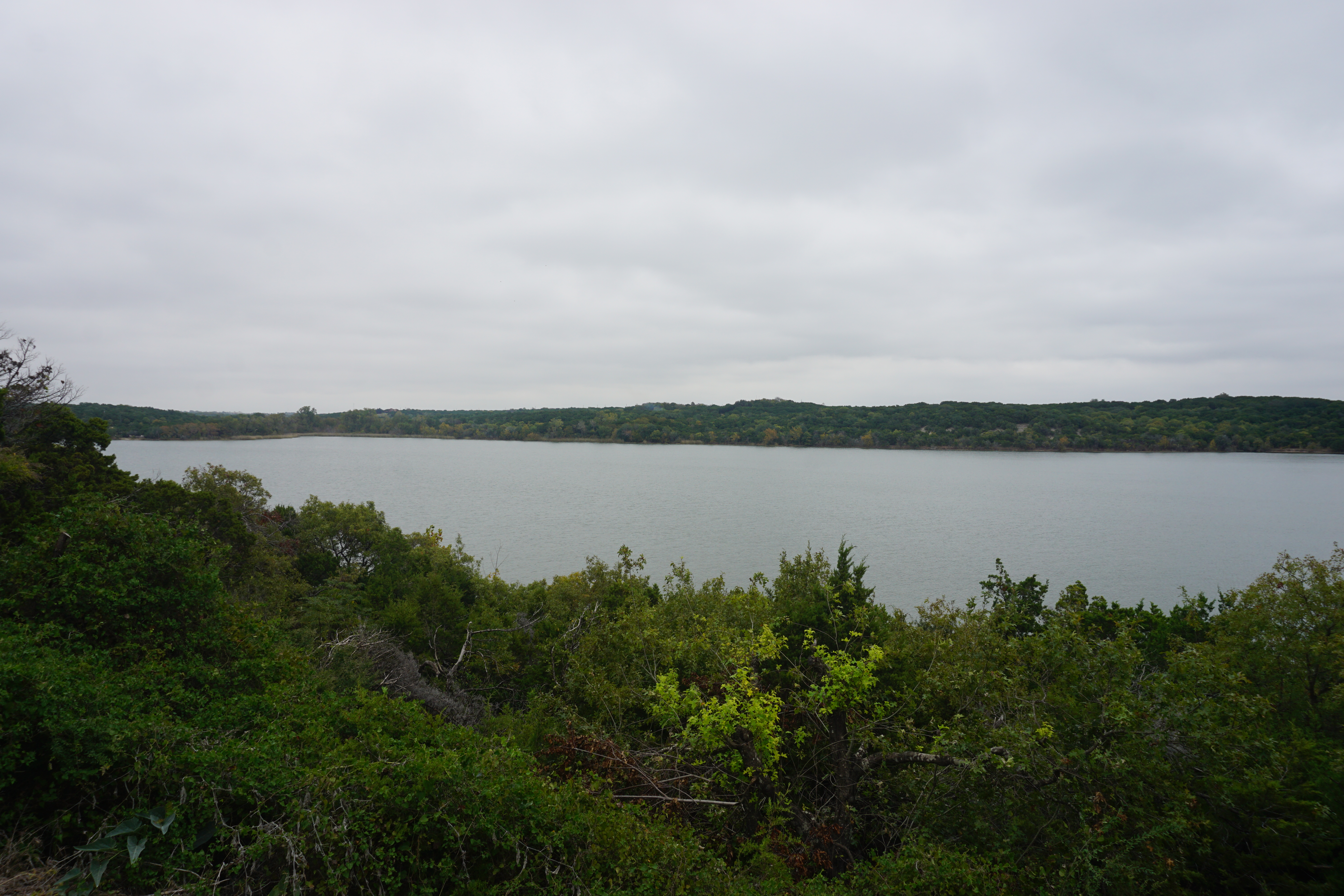
Cedar Lake at Cleburne State Park

Fishing is an extremely popular activity on the lake. Boating is allowed on Cedar Lake, but the speed on the lake is restricted to No Wake. Jet skis are not allowed as Cedar Lake is considered a community fishing lake, since it is totally encompassed by the state park.

13 miles (21 km) of mountain bike trails of various skill levels are available in a loop around the park. The terrain on the trail is diverse, including hills and flats. Hiking is also allowed on these trails and there are at least two geocaches located in the park.

There is an entrance fee to the park, at 6 dollars for 13 and older, and reservations are recommended.

== See also ==
- List of Texas state parks
