= Texas State Highway Loop 473 =

State highway in Texas

State Highway Loop 473
- Old Jacksboro Highway
- Loop 473 highlighted in red

Route information
- Maintained by TxDOT
- Length: 4.367 mi (7.028 km)
- Existed: 1969–present

Major junctions
- South end: US 281 in Wichita Falls
- US 82 / US 281 / US 287 in Wichita Falls
- North end: Bus. US 287 in Wichita Falls

Location
- Country: United States
- State: Texas
- Counties: Wichita

Highway system
- Highways in Texas; Interstate; US; State; Former; Toll; Loops; Spurs; FM/RM; Park; Rec
← Loop 472	→ Loop 474

State Highway Loop 473 (Loop 473) is a loop located in Wichita Falls.

== Route description ==
The highway begins at US 281 and Rathgeber Road. Loop 473 intersects SH 79 and FM 369 near Kickapoo Downtown Airport. Just south of downtown, the highway crosses US 281 again, which is cosigned with both US 82 and US 287 (East Central Freeway). Shortly after crossing the East Central Freeway, Loop 473 ends at Business US 287-J (Scott Avenue).

== History ==
Loop 473 was designated along an old alignment of US 281 on January 31, 1969, through the city when US 281 was relocated along the Henry S. Grace Freeway. At first, the Loop 473 designation was a hidden, internal one as the route was publicly signed as Bus. US 281 while the route originally terminated at its northern intersection with US 281. The Loop 473 designation became public after the route was extended northward on September 14, 1973, to the former Loop 370. Loop 370 itself was only an internal TxDOT designation publicly signed as a US 287 business route until that route formally became Business US 287-J in 1991.

== Major intersections ==
The entire route is in Wichita Falls, Wichita County.

mi	km	Destinations	Notes
0.0	0.0	US 281 / Rathgeber Road – Jacksboro	
0.7	1.1	SH 79 (Archer City Highway) / FM 369 (Southwestern Parkway) – Archer City	Interchange
3.4	5.5	US 82 / US 281 / US 287 (E. Central Freeway) – Seymour, Amarillo, Henrietta	
4.4	7.1	Bus. US 287 (Scott Avenue)	
1.000 mi = 1.609 km; 1.000 km = 0.621 mi
