= Morgan Mill, Texas =

Unincorporated community in Texas, US

Coordinates: 32°23′17″N 98°10′02″W

Morgan Mill is an unincorporated community in northeastern Erath County, Texas, United States. The community is on U.S. Route 281. It had a population of approximately 206 people in 1990.

Four-time world champion bull rider Tuff Hedeman lived in Morgan Mill for several years.

The Morgan Mill Independent School District serves area students.
