= Mineral Wells Airport =

Airport in Texas

Mineral Wells Airport (former Wolters Air Force Base)
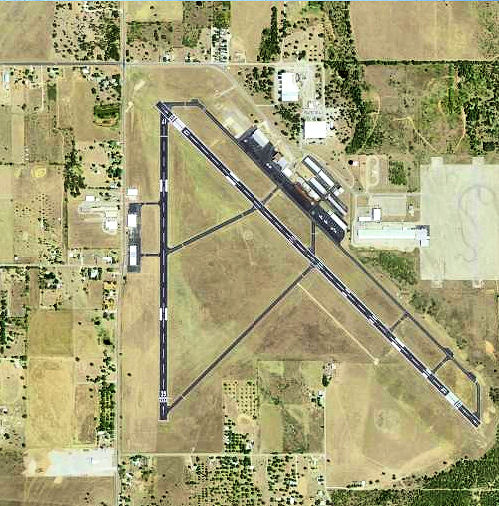
- USGS 2006 orthophoto
- IATA: MWL; ICAO: KMWL; FAA LID: MWL

Summary
- Airport type: Public
- Owner: City of Mineral Wells
- Serves: Mineral Wells, Texas
- Elevation AMSL: 974 ft (297 m)
- Coordinates: 32°46′54″N 98°03′37″W

Map
- Location within Texas

Runways
| Direction | Length | | Surface |
| Direction | ft | m | Surface |
|---|---|---|---|
| 13/31 | 5,996 | 1,828 | Asphalt |
| 17/35 | 4,188 | 1,277 | Asphalt |

Statistics (2008)
- Aircraft operations: 22,750
- Based aircraft: 78
- Source: Federal Aviation Administration

Mineral Wells Airport (IATA: MWL, ICAO: KMWL, FAA LID: MWL) is a public airport four miles southeast of Mineral Wells, Texas. The National Plan of Integrated Airport Systems for 2011–2015 called it a general aviation facility. It is owned and operated by the city of Mineral Wells. The airport, and the city, lie in Palo Pinto County and Parker County. The terminal is in Parker County.

== History ==
Originally established as Camp Wolters in 1925, it was named for Brig. Gen. Jacob F. Wolters, commander of the Fifty-sixth Brigade of the National Guard, and designated a summer training site for his units.

Mineral Wells donated 50 acres (200,000 m^{2}) of land, leased 2,300 acres (9.3 km^{2}), and in World War II provided land to increase the camp's area to 7,500 acres (30 km^{2}). The airfield opened in May 1943 and was used by the United States Army Air Forces as a training base. The army camp became an important infantry replacement training center with a troop capacity that reached a peak of 24,973.

In December 1945 the entire facility was deactivated.

Local businessmen purchased the land and facilities and converted them to private use. The tensions of the cold war, however, resulted in the reopening of the camp in early 1951, under the authority of the United States Air Force. At the installation, then named Wolters Air Force Base, was housed the newly formed Aviation Engineer Force. Special-category army and air force personnel were trained there.

In September 1956 the base became the Primary Helicopter Center directed by the United States Army. In June 1963 it was renamed Fort Wolters. At the time all army rotary-wing aviators received basic and primary flight training there.

The Vietnam War increased the need for pilots, and the base became the home for training not just army personnel, but also helicopter pilots for the Marine Corps in 1968 and for the Air Force in 1970. By 1970 Fort Wolters covered 8,500 acres (34 km^{2}) and leased an additional 1,700 to help handle the 1,200 helicopters used at the camp. By January 1, 1973, 40,000 students had completed the twenty-week training program. The base was also the home of the Beach Army Hospital, the Eighty-fourth Military Police Detachment, the 328th United States Army Band, and United States Army Reserve Detachment 20, Sixteenth Weather Squadron.

In 1975 orders deactivating the base were issued. Part of the land and facilities became the property of the city and private businessmen; 90 acres (360,000 m^{2}) and thirteen buildings became the Education Center of Weatherford College.

A portion of the land was transferred by the United States government to the state of Texas for development as part of Lake Mineral Wells State Park.

Pioneer Air Lines began flying to Mineral Wells in 1947; in 1949 it scheduled eight DC-3 departures a day. Successor Continental pulled out in 1958–59.

== Facilities ==
Mineral Wells Airport covers 505 acres (204 ha) at an elevation of 974 feet (297 m). It has two runways: 13/31 is 5,996 by 100 feet (1,828 x 30 m) and 17/35 is 4,188 by 100 feet (1,277 x 30 m).

In the year ending April 28, 2017 the airport had 32,250 aircraft operations, average 88 per day: 99% general aviation and 1% military. 59 aircraft were then based at this airport: 81% single-engine, 10% multi-engine, 7% helicopter, 1% jet, and 1% ultralight.

== Accidents and incidents ==
- 14 June 1985: A Cessna T210N, registration N6993N, was destroyed when it struck a hillside about 1/2 mi (0.8 km) short of the runway during an attempted nighttime forced landing after an engine failure. The pilot, the sole occupant, suffered minor injuries. The accident was attributed to fuel exhaustion and the pilot's failure to identify unsafe or hazardous conditions. Contributing factors were dark night conditions, rough terrain, and trees at the crash site.
- 10 June 1990: A Gyroflug SC01B160, registration N3412L, went into a steep bank and struck the ground on approach to land, destroying the aircraft and killing the pilot. One of the propeller blades was found 1/4 mi (0.4 km) from the crash site and several deficiences were found in the remaining propeller assembly. The accident was attributed to "total propeller blade retention failure, the resultant separation of one propeller blade, and the improper installation of the propeller by unknown maintenance personnel."
- 4 July 2001: The pilot of an experimental Glover RV-8, (Note: Homebuilt aircraft with the builder's last name listed as manufacturer; likely a Van's Aircraft RV-8.) registration N50FG, lost control of the aircraft during the takeoff roll when the control stick jammed under the instrument panel; as the pilot attempted to turn onto another runway, a crosswind caused the right wing to strike the ground, spinning the aircraft around. The pilot and single passenger escaped uninjured but the aircraft was destroyed in a post-crash fire. The accident was attributed to "the jammed elevator control stick on takeoff roll. A contributory factor was the crosswind."
- 12 November 2003: Immediately after taking off for a night cross-country flight, a Cessna 152, registration N95604, descended steeply and impacted terrain nose-first, causing substantial aircraft damage and seriously injuring the pilot and a single passenger. The pilot had no recollection of the flight afterwards. The accident was attributed to "the pilot's failure to maintain adequate airspeed which resulted in an inadvertent stall."
- 18 November 2003: During a simulated engine-out approach, a Cessna 550, registration N418MA began to sink rapidly and continued to descend despite the immediate application of full power to both engines and 12° of nose-up pitch. The jet touched down 350 ft (107 m) short of the runway threshold, collided with a berm, and was consumed in a post-crash fire. One of the four occupants suffered serious injuries. One pilot remarked that he had "never experienced wind shear like that before." The accident was attributed to "The pilot-in-command's failure to maintain control of the airplane while executing a simulated engine failure on final approach. A factor was the windshear."
- 4 August 2004: A Piper PA-32-260 Cherokee Six, registration N3352W, was flying over Runway 31 when it suddenly pitched up, banked, and descended sharply, colliding with a power pole and crashing off-airport. Both occupants were killed. The accident was attributed to "the pilot's failure to maintain airspeed which resulted in a stall. A contributing factor was the low altitude."
- 11 November 2006: A McCutchan Glasair, (Note: Homebuilt aircraft with the builder's last name listed as manufacturer; the NTSB accident report does not reveal the specific Glasair model.) registration N606MC, spiraled to the ground and crashed 1.68 mi (2.70 km) short of the runway, killing both aircraft occupants. The aircraft was found with the fuel tanks and carburetor float bowl empty, with no signs of leaked fuel at the crash site, and the propeller blades showing no signatures of rotation on impact. The accident was attributed to "The pilot's failure to maintain airspeed during a forced landing, resulting in an inadvertent stall. A factor was the loss of engine power due to fuel exhaustion."
- 21 September 2016: A Piper PA-30 Twin Comanche, registration N7663Y, lost power in both engines on approach and the pilot initiated an off-airport forced landing; the aircraft suffered substantial damage and the pilot and one of the two passengers were seriously injured. Immediately before losing power, the pilot had switched from the auxiliary tanks to the main tanks, which were found empty. However, investigators found evidence that the wing tip fuel tanks had been full, writing that "...it is likely that pilot did not use the tip fuel tanks during the previous flight despite believing that he had done so and instead used the main and auxiliary fuel tanks." The accident was attributed to "The pilot's fuel mismanagement, which resulted in fuel starvation to both engines and their subsequent loss of engine power."

== See also ==
- Texas World War II Army Airfields
- List of airports in Texas

== Other sources ==
- Manning, Thomas A. (2005), History of Air Education and Training Command, 1942–2002. Office of History and Research, Headquarters, AETC, Randolph AFB, Texas OCLC 71006954, 29991467
- Shaw, Frederick J. (2004), Locating Air Force Base Sites, History’s Legacy, Air Force History and Museums Program, United States Air Force, Washington DC. OCLC 57007862, 1050653629
- Thole, Lou (1999), Forgotten Fields of America : World War II Bases and Training, Then and Now - Vol. 2. Publisher: Pictorial Histories Pub, ISBN 1-57510-051-7
