= Lake Mineral Wells State Park & Trailway =

State park in Texas, United States

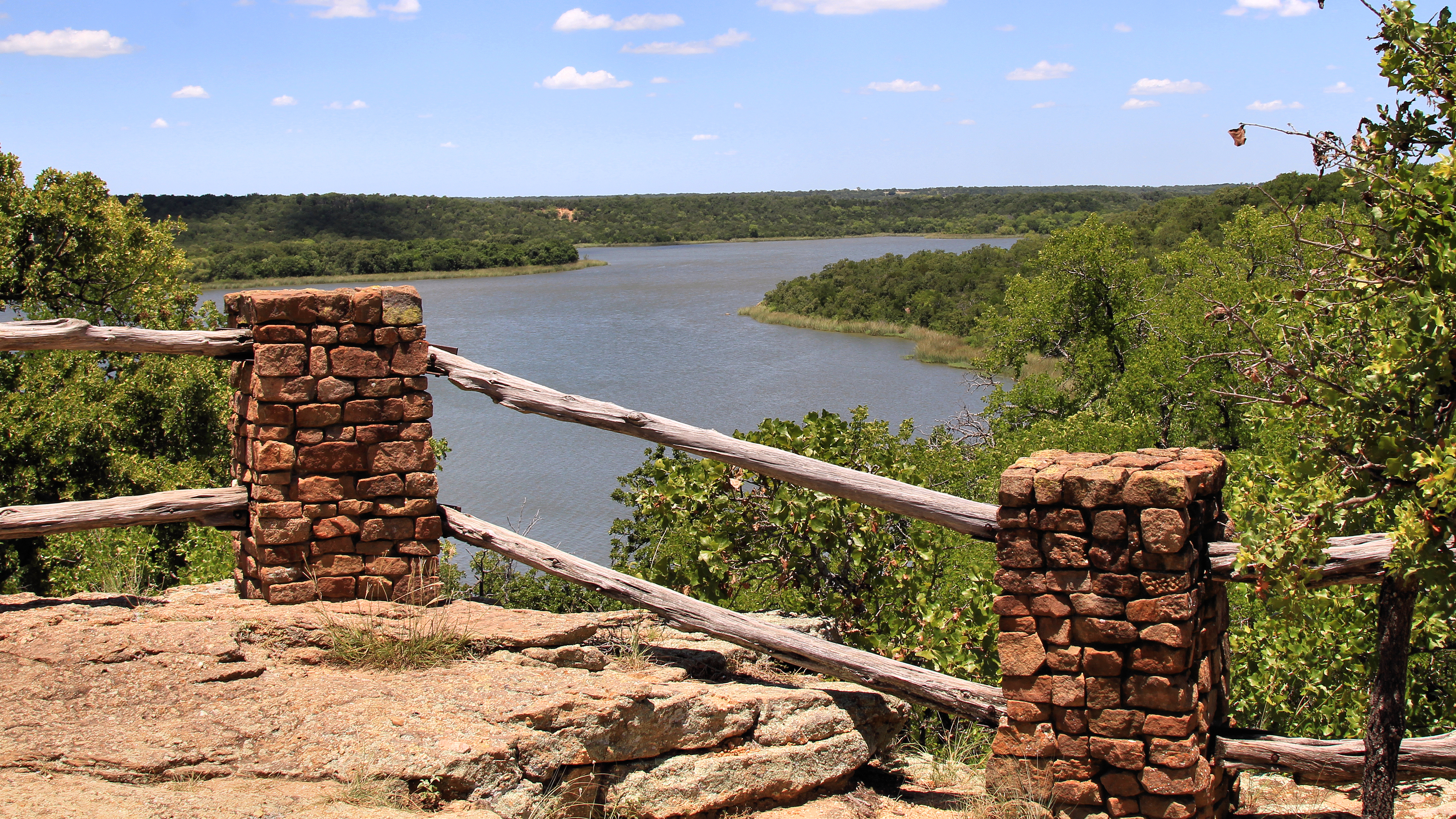
- Lake Mineral Wells State Park

- Location within Texas Location within the United States
- Location: Parker County, Texas
- Nearest city: Mineral Wells, TX
- Coordinates: 32°51′03″N 98°01′36″W
- Area: 3,282.5 acres (1,328 ha)
- Established: 1975
- Visitors: 175,958 (in 2025)
- Governing body: Texas Parks and Wildlife Department
- Website: Official site

Lake Mineral Wells State Park & Trailway is a 3,282.5 acres (1,328 ha) state park located in Mineral Wells, Parker County, Texas, United States. The park opened in 1981 and is managed by the Texas Parks and Wildlife Department. It includes Lake Mineral Wells and is the only state park in Texas which protects part of the Western Cross Timbers and Mineral Wells Trailway. Also within the park is Penitentiary Hollow, a somewhat unusual geological feature which resembles a small canyon. It is a popular site for rock climbing, though the only type of climbing allowed is top rope. The park also features over 31 miles (50 km) of hiking trails, 25 miles (40 km) of which are open to bicycles and horses. Campsites can be found by the small lake, and up on the higher areas of the park, as well.

== History ==
The Lake Mineral Wells Trailway follows the route of the former Weatherford, Mineral Wells and Northwestern Railway that closed entirely in 1992. The railroad was opened in 1891. Some of the line was abandoned in sections, and the rest was subsequently merged into the Missouri Pacific Railroad in 1988. The following year, the line changed ownership again to the town of Mineral Wells, who purchased the line from MP and operated it as the Mineral Wells and Eastern until 1992 when the remainder of the line was abandoned. It was subsequently converted to a trailway.

Part of the park currently pass through the testing range of the former Fort Wolters Military Reservation.

== Area Attractions ==
Close by attractions include:

- Fort Richardson State Park, Historic Site, and Lost Creek Reservoir State Trailway
- Possum Kingdom State Park
- Cleburne State Park
- Clark Gardens

== See also ==
- List of Texas state parks
