= Rachal, Texas =

- Unincorporated community
- Location within Texas Location within the United States
- Coordinates: 26°53′24″N 98°08′07″W
- Country: United States
- State: Texas
- County: Brooks
- Elevation: 121 ft (37 m)
- Time zone: UTC-6 (Central (CST))
  - Summer (DST): UTC-5 (CDT)
- Area code: 361
- GNIS feature ID: 1344693

Rachal is an unincorporated community in south-central Brooks County, Texas, United States. According to the Handbook of Texas, the community had a population of 36 in 2000.

== History ==
Established in 1913, the community of Rachal derives its name from E.R. Rachal, the first Brooks County tax assessor. In 1936, Rachal was home to only 10 residents and a solitary business. However, by 1945, the population had grown to 40, and a second business had been added. Since 1964, the population has fluctuated between 30 and 40 residents. As of 2000, Rachal was home to 36 residents and a few businesses. The community's history reflects its growth and development over the years.

== Geography ==
Rachal is located near the intersection of U.S. Highway 281 and FM 755, approximately 21 mi (34 km) south of Falfurrias.

== Education ==
Rachal is served by the Brooks County Independent School District.
