= Cornerstone Regional Hospital =

- Universal Health Services Inc.

Geography
- Location: 2302 Cornerstone Blvd, Edinburg 77839, Texas, United States
- Coordinates: 26.26256°N 98.19845°W

Organization
- Care system: Public
- Type: Community

Services
- Beds: 14
- Helipad: Yes

History
- Opened: 1998

Links
- Website: Cornerstone Regional Hospital
- Lists: Hospitals in Texas

Cornerstone Regional Hospital is a for-profit hospital in Edinburg, Texas, partially owned and operated by Universal Health Services. Cornerstone Regional Hospital is licensed by the state of Texas and accredited by The Joint Commission. The hospital is designed to serve patients with general medical and surgical care. Cornerstone Regional Hospital does not provide services to patients who need obstetrics, telemetry or intensive care.

== History ==
A group of physicians in 1998 founded Cornerstone Regional Hospital as an acute care hospital that emphasized orthopedics and general surgery. In August 2005, Cornerstone Regional Hospital affiliated with the largest healthcare system in the Rio Grande Valley, South Texas Health System. Cornerstone Regional Hospital is directly or indirectly owned by a partnership that includes physician owners, including certain members of the hospital medical staff. Cornerstone Regional Hospital is also partially owned and operated by a subsidiary of Universal Health Services, Inc. (UHS), a King of Prussia, PA-based company, that is one of the largest healthcare management companies in the nation.

== Services ==
Cornerstone Regional Hospital offers a list of medical services and specialties, including its original emphasis on orthopedics and general surgery.

- Computed Tomography
- MRI
- Respiratory Therapy
- Minimally Invasive Surgical Center
- Endoscopy
- plastic and Reconstructive Surgery
- Radiology
- Orthopedic surgery

== Awards and accolades ==
- Texas Hospital Quality Improvement Award - Gold from TMF
- First Hospital south of Austin to offer Makoplasty partial knee replacement surgery, also offers Navio knee replacement surgery
