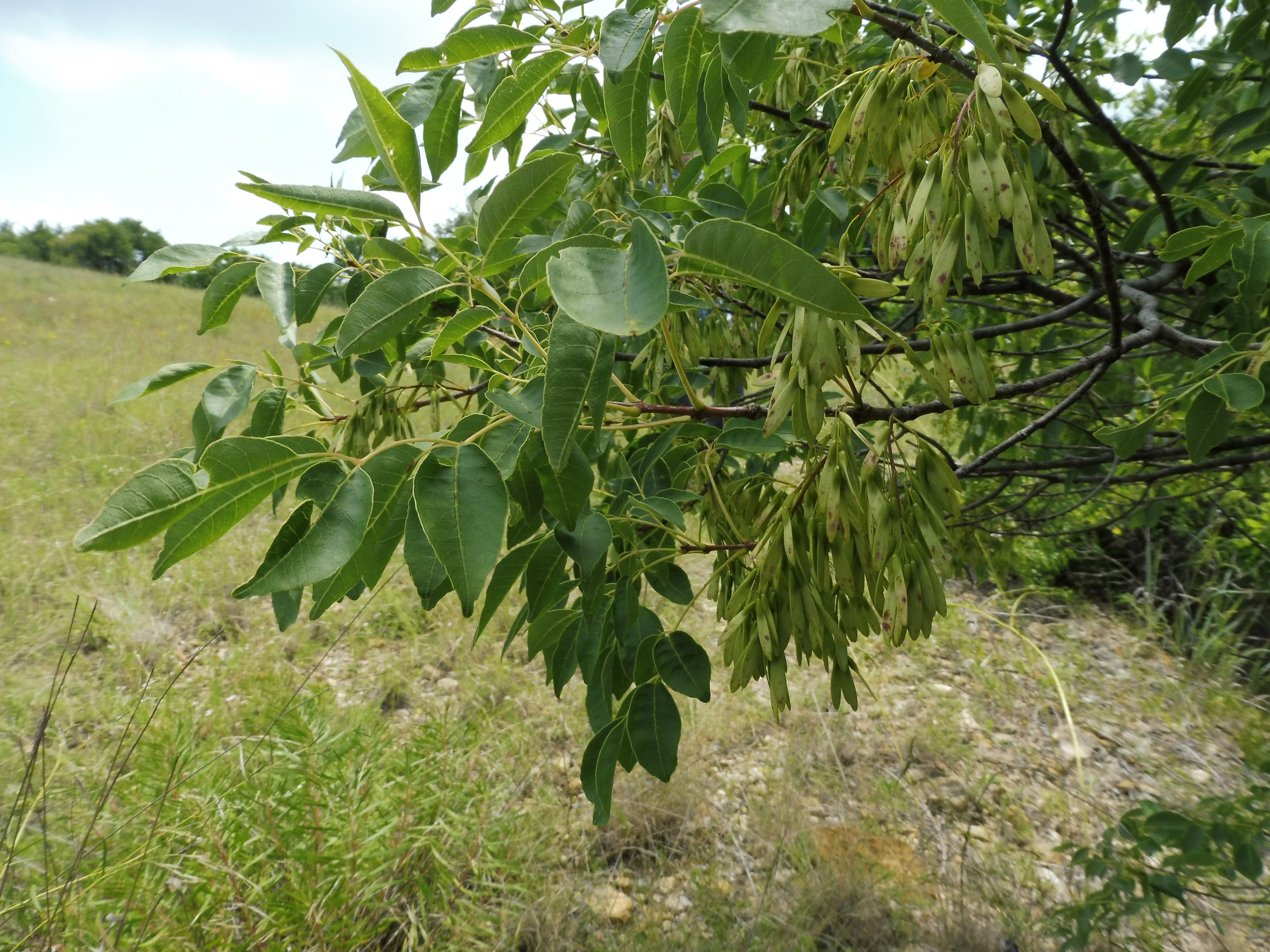

Scientific classification
- Kingdom: Plantae
- Clade: Tracheophytes
- Clade: Angiosperms
- Clade: Eudicots
- Clade: Asterids
- Order: Lamiales
- Family: Oleaceae
- Genus: Fraxinus
- Section: Fraxinus sect. Melioides
- Species: F. albicans

Binomial name
- Fraxinus albicans Buckley
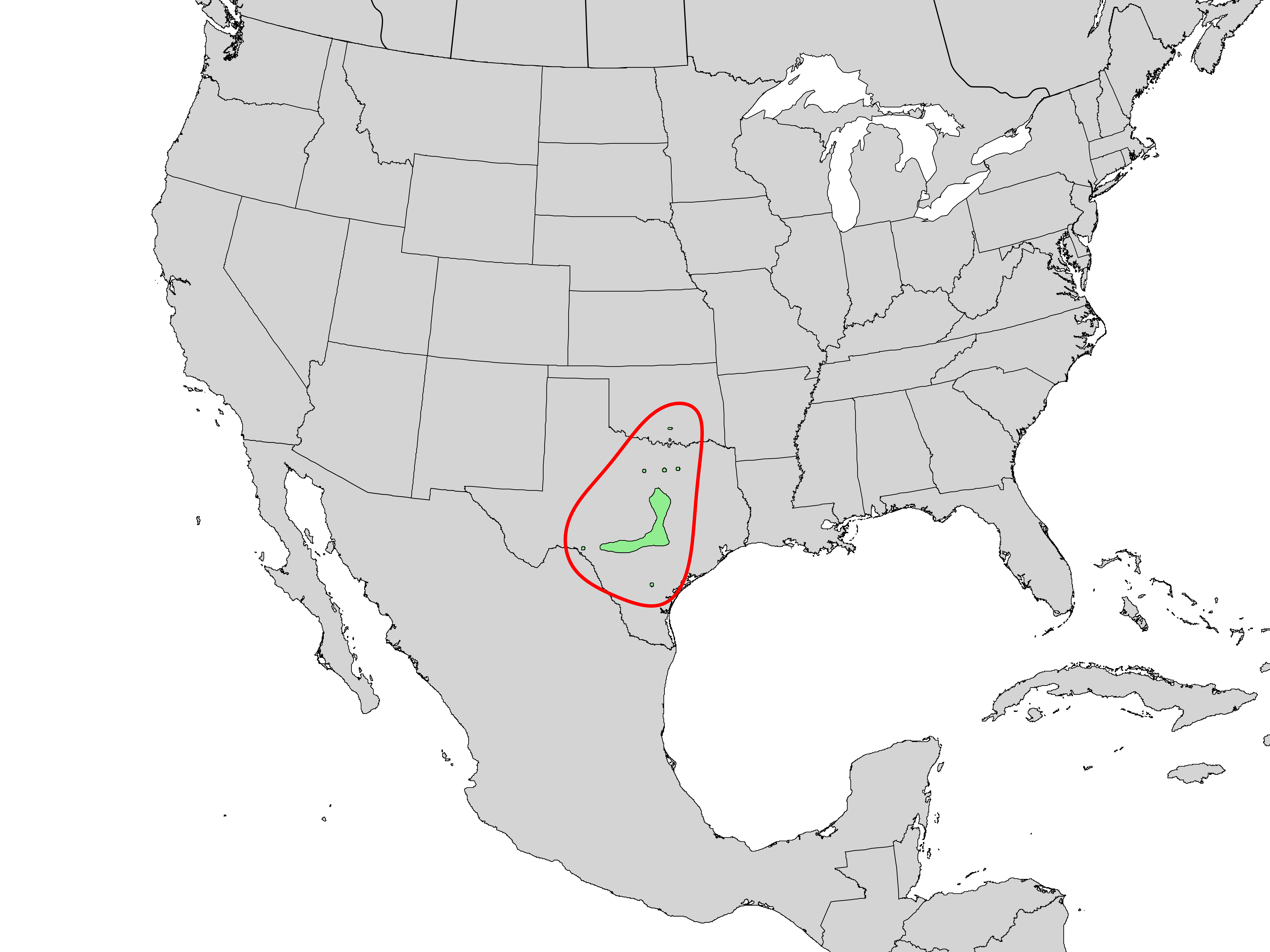
- Natural range of Fraxinus albicans
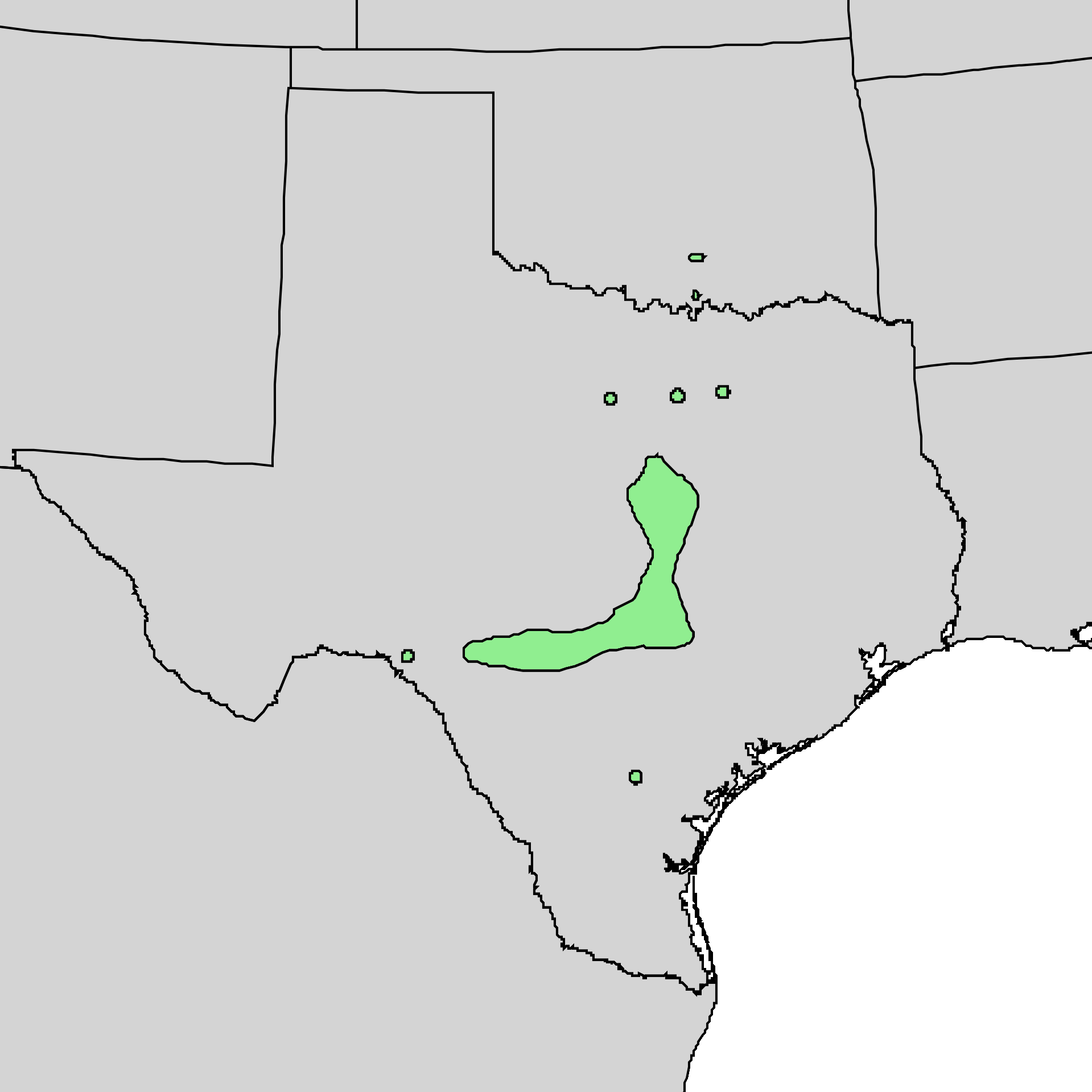
- Close-up of natural range of Fraxinus albicans

Synonyms
- Fraxinus americana var. texensis A. Gray (1878); Fraxinus americana subsp. texensis (A. Gray) G.N. Mill.; Fraxinus texensis (A. Gray) Sarg.

= Fraxinus albicans =

Species of flowering plant

Fraxinus albicans, commonly called the Texas ash, is a species of tree in the olive family (Oleaceae). It is native to North America, where it is found from eastern Texas and southern Oklahoma in the United States, to the state of Durango in Mexico. Its natural habitat is in dry, rocky slopes, often over limestone.

== Description ==
It is a small deciduous tree growing to 10 m tall, with a trunk up to 30 cm diameter. The leaves are 13–21 cm long, pinnately compound with usually five rounded leaflets 3–7.5 cm long and 2–5 cm broad. The flowers are purple, produced in small clusters in early spring; like all ashes, the Texas ash is dioecious, with male and female flowers on separate trees. The fruit is a samara 1.5–3 cm long, with an apical wing. It is long-lived and drought tolerant.

Like other species in the section Melioides, Fraxinus albicans is dioecious, with male and female flowers produced on separate individuals.

== Taxonomy ==
Fraxinus albicans is closely related to Fraxinus americana (white ash), and is sometimes treated as a variety of it. Where they co-occur, Fraxinus albicans is found in dry habitats while Fraxinus americana is found in mesic bottoms. Fraxinus albicans can be morphologically distinguished by its smaller leaves, smaller and more rounded leaflets, and smaller samaras.
