= Bluetown, Texas =

- Census-designated place
- Location within the state of Texas
- Coordinates: 26°4′27″N 97°49′22″W
- Country: United States
- State: Texas
- County: Cameron

Government
  - Mayor: Eric Booth

Area
  - Total: 2.4 sq mi (6.3 km^{2})
  - Land: 2.4 sq mi (6.1 km^{2})
  - Water: 0.077 sq mi (0.2 km^{2})
- Elevation: 67 ft (20 m)

Population (2020)
  - Total: 491
  - Density: 150/sq mi (58.1/km^{2})
- Time zone: UTC-6 (Central (CST))
  - Summer (DST): UTC-5 (CDT)
- FIPS code: 48-08908

Bluetown is a census-designated place (CDP) in Cameron County, in the U.S. state of Texas. As of the 2020 census, Bluetown had a population of 491. It is part of the Brownsville–Harlingen Metropolitan Statistical Area.

== Geography ==
Bluetown is in southwestern Cameron County, bordered to the west by Iglesia Antigua and to the south by the Rio Grande, which forms the Mexico–United States border. U.S. Route 281 passes through the community, leading southeastward 26 miles (42 km) to Brownsville and west 29 miles (47 km) to Hidalgo. La Feria is 6 miles (10 km) to the north.

According to the United States Census Bureau, the Bluetown CDP has a total area of 2.4 square miles (6.3 km^{2}), of which 2.4 square miles (6.1 km^{2}) is land and 0.08 square miles (0.2 km^{2}), or 2.72%, is water.

== Demographics ==
Historical population
Census	Pop.	Note	%±
2010	356		—
2020	491		37.9%
U.S. Decennial Census; 1850–1900 1910; 1920 1930 1940; 1950 1960 1970; 1980 1990 2000; 2010

Bluetown first appeared as a census designated place in the 2010 U.S. census after the Bluetown-Iglesia Antigua CDP was split into the Bluetown and Iglesia Antigua CDPs.

=== 2020 census ===
Bluetown CDP, Texas – Racial and ethnic composition Note: the US Census treats Hispanic/Latino as an ethnic category. This table excludes Latinos from the racial categories and assigns them to a separate category. Hispanics/Latinos may be of any race.
Race / Ethnicity (NH = Non-Hispanic)	Pop 2010	Pop 2020	% 2010	% 2020
White alone (NH)	11	38	3.09%	7.74%
Black or African American alone (NH)	0	0	0.00%	0.00%
Native American or Alaska Native alone (NH)	1	1	0.28%	0.20%
Asian alone (NH)	1	0	0.28%	0.00%
Native Hawaiian or Pacific Islander alone (NH)	0	0	0.00%	0.00%
Other race alone (NH)	0	1	0.00%	0.20%
Mixed race or Multiracial (NH)	0	3	0.00%	0.61%
Hispanic or Latino (any race)	343	448	96.35%	91.24%
Total	356	491	100.00%	100.00%
