= Santa Maria, Texas =

- Census-designated place
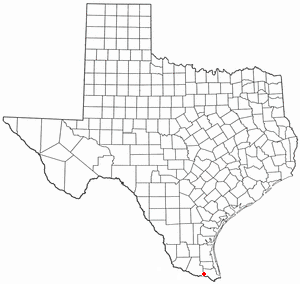
- Location of Santa Maria, Texas

- Coordinates: 26°4′41″N 97°50′53″W
- Country: United States
- State: Texas
- County: Cameron

Area
  - Total: 0.23 sq mi (0.6 km^{2})
  - Land: 0.23 sq mi (0.6 km^{2})
  - Water: 0 sq mi (0.0 km^{2})
- Elevation: 66 ft (20 m)

Population (2020)
  - Total: 651
  - Density: 2,800/sq mi (1,100/km^{2})
- Time zone: UTC-6 (Central (CST))
  - Summer (DST): UTC-5 (CDT)
- ZIP code: 78592
- Area code: 956
- FIPS code: 48-65744
- GNIS feature ID: 1376017

Santa Maria is a census-designated place (CDP) in Cameron County, Texas, United States. The population was 651 at the 2020 census. It is part of the Brownsville–Harlingen Metropolitan Statistical Area.

== History ==
The community known as Santa Maria was first established in the 1750s by José de Escandón's colonists. In 1777, the land of Santa Maria would be granted from Spain to Rosa María Hinojosa de Ballí, a known rancher in Spanish Texas, now apart of the Southwestern United States and Northern Mexico.

It is likely that the community was named after Saint Mary, the mother of Jesus Christ.

== Geography ==
Santa Maria is located near the southwestern corner of Cameron County at 26°4′41″N 97°50′53″W (26.077955, -97.847926). U.S. Route 281 passes through the CDP, leading southeastward 27 miles (43 km) to Brownsville and west 26 miles (42 km) to Hidalgo. The community is approximately one mile north of the Rio Grande, which forms the Mexico–United States border.

According to the United States Census Bureau, the CDP has a total area of 0.24 square miles (0.63 km^{2}), all land.

== Demographics ==
Historical population
Census	Pop.	Note	%±
2000	846		—
2010	733		−13.4%
2020	651		−11.2%
U.S. Decennial Census; 1850–1900 1910; 1920 1930 1940; 1950 1960 1970; 1980 1990 2000; 2010 2020

Santa Maria first appeared as a census designated place in the 2000 U.S. census.

=== 2020 census ===
Santa Maria CDP, Texas – Racial and ethnic composition Note: the US Census treats Hispanic/Latino as an ethnic category. This table excludes Latinos from the racial categories and assigns them to a separate category. Hispanics/Latinos may be of any race.
Race / Ethnicity (NH = Non-Hispanic)	Pop 2000	Pop 2010	Pop 2020	% 2000	% 2010	% 2020
White alone (NH)	1	2	8	0.12%	0.27%	1.23%
Black or African American alone (NH)	0	0	0	0.00%	0.00%	0.00%
Native American or Alaska Native alone (NH)	0	0	0	0.00%	0.00%	0.00%
Asian alone (NH)	0	1	0	0.00%	0.14%	0.00%
Native Hawaiian or Pacific Islander alone (NH)	0	0	0	0.00%	0.00%	0.00%
Other race alone (NH)	0	0	4	0.00%	0.00%	0.61%
Mixed race or Multiracial (NH)	1	1	6	0.12%	0.14%	0.92%
Hispanic or Latino (any race)	844	729	633	99.76%	99.45%	97.24%
Total	846	733	651	100.00%	100.00%	100.00%

As of the census of 2000, there were 846 people, 220 households, and 198 families residing in the CDP. The population density was 3,622.2 inhabitants per square mile (1,398.5/km^{2}). There were 241 housing units at an average density of 1,031.8 per square mile (398.4/km^{2}). The racial makeup of the CDP was 55.67% White, 0.24% Native American, 43.85% from other races, and 0.24% from two or more races. Hispanic or Latino of any race were 99.76% of the population.

There were 220 households, out of which 49.1% had children under the age of 18 living with them, 68.6% were married couples living together, 15.9% had a female householder with no husband present, and 10.0% were non-families. 8.6% of all households were made up of individuals, and 5.0% had someone living alone who was 65 years of age or older. The average household size was 3.85 and the average family size was 4.11.

In the CDP, the population was spread out, with 36.4% under the age of 18, 11.5% from 18 to 24, 26.6% from 25 to 44, 14.3% from 45 to 64, and 11.2% who were 65 years of age or older. The median age was 26 years. For every 100 females, there were 85.1 males. For every 100 females age 18 and over, there were 88.8 males.

The median income for a household in the CDP was $16,917, and the median income for a family was $18,750. Males had a median income of $13,889 versus $13,250 for females. The per capita income for the CDP was $5,794. About 39.9% of families and 47.2% of the population were below the poverty line, including 66.4% of those under age 18 and 14.3% of those age 65 or over.

== Education ==
Santa Maria is served by the Santa Maria Independent School District.

In addition, South Texas Independent School District operates magnet schools that serve the community.

== Government and infrastructure ==
The United States Postal Service operates the Santa Maria Post Office.
