= List of Farm to Market Roads in Texas (800–899) =

- Texas Farm to Market Road and Ranch to Market Road markers

Highway names
- Interstates: Interstate Highway X (IH-X, I-X)
- US Highways: U.S. Highway X (US X)
- State: State Highway X (SH X)
- Loops: Loop X
- Spurs: Spur X
- Recreational: Recreational Road X (RE X)
- Farm or Ranch to Market Roads: Farm to Market Road X (FM X); Ranch to Market Road X (RM X)
- Park Roads: Park Road X (PR X)

System links
- Highways in Texas; Interstate; US; State; Former; Toll; Loops; Spurs; FM/RM; Park; Rec

Farm to Market Roads in the U.S. state of Texas are owned and maintained by the Texas Department of Transportation (TxDOT).

== FM 800 ==
Farm to Market Road 800
- Location: Cameron County
- Length: 16.957 mi (27.290 km)
- Existed: 1948–present

Farm to Market Road 800 (FM 800) is located in Cameron County in the Lower Rio Grande Valley.

FM 800 begins at an intersection with FM 2520 southwest of San Benito. The highway travels in a northwest direction and intersects FM 509 and FM 1479 in Rangerville. FM 800 runs in a westward direction before turning to the north at FM 3067 near La Feria. The highway runs in a predominately northward direction along Bass Boulevard and briefly enters Harlingen where FM 800 meets I-2/US 83. FM 800 continues to run north before ending at intersection with SH 107 between Santa Rosa and Combes.

FM 800 was designated on July 20, 1948, running from US 83 near La Feria to SH 107. On November 23 of that year, the highway was extended south and eastward to FM 509. On July 15, 1949, FM 800 was extended eastward to Sam Houston Boulevard, which later became FM 2520 on October 31, 1957.

Junction list

The entire route is in Cameron County.

Location	mi	km	Destinations	Notes
	0.0	0.0	FM 2520 (Sam Houston Boulevard)	
Harlingen	2.8	4.5	FM 509	
Harlingen	3.1	5.0	FM 801 north (Ed Carey Drive)	
Rangerville	4.5	7.2	FM 1479 (Rangerville Road)	
	7.8	12.6	FM 3067 west	
Harlingen	11.6	18.7	Bus. US 83 – La Feria, Harlingen	
Harlingen	12.3	19.8	I-2 / US 83 (Expressway 83)	I-2 exit 171
	14.4	23.2	FM 2994 east (Wilson Road)	
	16.9	27.2	SH 107 – Santa Rosa, Combes	
1.000 mi = 1.609 km; 1.000 km = 0.621 mi

== FM 801 ==
Farm to Market Road 801
- Location: Cameron County
- Length: 3.541 mi (5.699 km)
- Existed: 1948–present

Farm to Market Road 801 (FM 801) is located in Cameron County.

FM 801 begins at an intersection with FM 800 in the southernmost part of Harlingen. The highway travels in a northeast direction along Ed Carey Drive before ending at I-69E/US 77/US 83. Ed Carey Drive continues north past here as Loop 499.

FM 801 was designated on July 20, 1948, running from US 77 to a point 4.5 miles (7.2 km) to the southwest. On June 8, 1949, the highway was extended farther southwest to FM 800. On August 1, 1963, FM 801 was extended another mile along Ed Carey Drive into Harlingen; this section was cancelled on May 21, 1979, when Loop 499 was created.

== FM 802 ==
Farm to Market Road 802
- Location: Cameron County
- Length: 8.622 mi (13.876 km)
- Existed: 1948–present

Farm to Market Road 802 (FM 802) is located in Brownsville.

FM 802 begins at an intersection with US 281. The route travels eastward along Ruben M. Torres Sr. Boulevard, and lies to the north of the Los Fresnos Canal. It crosses I-69E / US 77 / US 83, FM 1847, and SH 48 before ending at an intersection with FM 511 north of Brownsville Airport.

FM 802 was initially designated on July 20, 1948, consisting of a segment from US 83 eastward to SH 48. On November 23, 1948, a westward extension to US 281 was added, and the eastern extension to FM 511 occurred on November 20, 1951. Originally, FM 802 followed Coffee Port Road through Brownsville, but the route was relocated to a more northerly alignment on May 20, 1975.

On June 27, 1995, the entire route was redesignated Urban Road 802 (UR 802). The designation reverted to FM 802 with the elimination of the Urban Road system on November 15, 2018.

Junction list

The entire route is in Brownsville, Cameron County.

mi	km	Destinations	Notes
0.0	0.0	US 281 – Hidalgo	Western terminus
2.2	3.5	Bus. US 77 (Central Boulevard)	
2.3	3.7	I-69E / US 77 / US 83 – Harlingen, Veterans International Bridge to Matamoros	I-69E exit 4
3.4	5.5	FM 1847 (Paredes Line Road) – Los Fresnos	
7.2	11.6	SH 48 (Padre Island Highway) – Port Isabel	
8.6	13.8	FM 511 (Indiana Avenue)	Eastern terminus
1.000 mi = 1.609 km; 1.000 km = 0.621 mi

== FM 803 ==
Farm to Market Road 803
- Location: Cameron County
- Length: 13.596 mi (21.881 km)
- Existed: 1948–present

Farm to Market Road 803 (FM 803) is located in Cameron County.

FM 803 begins at I-169/SH 550/FM 511 in northern Brownsville near Olmito. The highway travels along Olmitto North Road through the city's northern part. FM 803 intersects SH 100 before leaving Brownsville. The highway intersects FM 2893 and FM 510 between Green Valley Farms and Laureles. FM 803 runs through Arroyo Gardens-La Tina Ranch where it intersects FM 1561 before ending at FM 106.

FM 803 was designated on July 20, 1948, running from Olmito to SH 100. The highway was extended farther north and west to FM 106 on November 23, 1948. The section of FM 803 between US 83 and FM 511 was removed from the state highway system on February 26, 1957. On November 10, 1967, the portion from FM 2358 (this section became part of FM 106 and the rest became part of FM 1847) west to FM 106 (this section was renumbered FM 2925) was transferred to rerouted FM 106. A new routing of FM 803 to I-69E/US 77 was constructed and was designated on December 13, 2018.

Junction list

The entire route is in Cameron County.

Location	mi	km	Destinations	Notes
Brownsville	0.0	0.0	I-169 / SH 550 Toll / FM 511 – Airport, Port Brownsville	
Brownsville	3.3	5.3	SH 100 – South Padre Island	
	5.9	9.5	FM 2893 east – Laureles	
	7.4	11.9	FM 510 – San Benito, Laguna Vista	
Arroyo Gardens-La Tina Ranch	10.6	17.1	FM 1561 west – Villa Del Sol	
Arroyo Gardens-La Tina Ranch	13.6	21.9	FM 106 – Rio Hondo	
1.000 mi = 1.609 km; 1.000 km = 0.621 mi

== FM 804 ==
Farm to Market Road 804
- Location: Henderson County
- Length: 5.868 mi (9.444 km)
- Existed: 1947–present

Farm to Market Road 804 (FM 804) is located in Henderson County. it runs from US 175 to FM 607.

FM 804 was designated on October 25, 1947, to run from FM 313 (later FM 314, now FM 607) in New York to Baxter. On August 21, 1950, the road was extended to US 175, replacing Spur 65 and completing its current route.

== FM 805 ==
Farm to Market Road 805
- Location: Marion County
- Length: 5.544 mi (8.922 km)
- Existed: 1947–present

Farm to Market Road 805 (FM 805) is located in Marion County. It runs from SH 49 to Caddo Lake.

FM 805 was designated on October 25, 1947, to run from SH 49 to Caddo Lake. On March 29, 1949, the road was extended 1.1 miles (1.8 km) along Caddo Lake Shore, completing its current route.

== FM 806 ==
Farm to Market Road 806
- Location: Colorado County
- Length: 4.135 mi (6.655 km)
- Existed: July 20, 1948–present

Farm to Market Road 806 (FM 806) is located in Colorado County. It runs from US 90 in Columbus southwestward 4.1 miles (6.6 km) before state maintenance ends. The roadway continues past this point as CR 106, which connects to US 90 Alt. in Rock Island.

FM 806 was designated on July 20, 1948, running from west of Columbus southwestward 5.1 miles (8.2 km). Its northern terminus was shifted to US 90 on January 27, 1949.

== FM 807 ==
Farm to Market Road 807
- Location: Dallam and Hartley counties
- Length: 42.941 mi (Note: The certified length given is shorter than the actual mileage, as the TxDOT description of FM 807 considers it to be discontinuous at rather than concurrent with US 54, FM 281 and FM 297.) (69.107 km)
- Existed: 1948–present

Farm to Market Road 807 (FM 807) is located in Dallam and Hartley counties.

FM 807 begins at an intersection with US 87/US 385/FM 998 in Hartley. The highway travels in a northern direction before turning to the east at County Road I before turning back to the north at FM 3422. FM 807 has an overlap with FM 281 before entering into Dallam County. After entering Dallam County, FM 807 has an overlap with FM 297. The highway continues to travel north and has a brief overlap with US 54 through the town of Conlen. FM 807 travels through the Rita Blanca National Grassland before ending at an intersection with US 287 in Kerrick near the Oklahoma state line.

FM 807 was designated on July 20, 1948, running from US 54 in Conlen northward 2.5 miles (4.0 km) to the Rita Blanca National Grassland. On July 14, 1949, the highway was extended southward 5.5 miles (8.9 km) from Conlen to a road intersection. On May 23, 1951, FM 807 was extended farther south to FM 297. The highway was extended farther north 6.0 miles (9.7 km) through the Rita Blanca National Grassland on November 21, 1956. FM 807 was extended farther north 4.4 miles (7.1 km) on October 31, 1957, before being extended again to US 287 on February 27, 1958. On December 18, 1959, the highway was extended farther south into Hartley County to US 87/US 385 in Hartley, replacing part of FM 297 (a section became a 0.3 miles (0.48 km) spur connection) and all of FM 1712 and FM 2029 in the process. The spur connection was transferred back to FM 297 on May 6, 1964.

Junction list

County	Location	mi	km	Destinations	Notes
Hartley	Hartley	0.0	0.0	US 87 / US 385 / FM 998 north – Dalhart, Channing, Dumas	
Hartley		4.6	7.4	FM 3422 east	
Hartley		9.3	15.0	FM 2577 east	
Hartley		11.6	18.7	FM 281 west – Dalhart	South end of FM 281 overlap
Hartley		14.6	23.5	FM 281 east – Cactus	North end of FM 281 overlap
Dallam		16.3	26.2	FM 297 west – Dalhart	South end of FM 297 overlap
Dallam		20.7	33.3	FM 297 east – Cactus	North end of FM 297 overlap
Dallam		26.5	42.6	FM 3212 west	
Dallam	Conlen	32.0	51.5	US 54 west – Dalhart	South end of US 54 overlap
Dallam	Conlen	32.2	51.8	US 54 east – Stratford	North end of US 54 overlap
Dallam	Kerrick	50.5	81.3	US 287 – Boise City, Stratford	
1.000 mi = 1.609 km; 1.000 km = 0.621 mi: Concurrency terminus

== FM 808 ==
Farm to Market Road 808
- Location: Dallam County
- Existed: July 20, 1948–August 29, 1990

Farm to Market Road 808 (FM 808) was located in Dallam County. No highway currently uses the FM 808 designation.

FM 808 was designated on July 20, 1948, running from US 87 near Dalhart to a point 13.3 miles (21.4 km) northwest of there. On December 16, 1948, the highway was extended 9.3 miles (15.0 km) to the Texas/New Mexico state line. On April 30, 1955, FM 808 was signed (but not designated) as SH 102. FM 808 was cancelled on August 29, 1990, as the SH 102 designation became official.

== FM 809 ==
Farm to Market Road 809
- Location: Oldham and Deaf Smith counties
- Length: 20.895 mi (33.627 km)
- Existed: 1948–present

Farm to Market Road 809 (FM 809) is located in Oldham and Deaf Smith counties. It runs from I-40 in Wildorado to US 60 in Dawn.

FM 809 was designated on August 24, 1948, to run from US 66 (now I-40) south to the Oldham/Deaf Smith County Line as a renumbering of FM 287 because the road was too close to US 287. On November 30, 1949, the road was extended south 5.7 miles (9.2 km) to a road intersection. On May 23, 1951, the road was extended to FM 1062. On June 27, 1951, the road was extended to US 60, replacing a section of FM 1062.

== FM 810 ==
Farm to Market Road 810
- Location: Clay County
- Length: 8.985 mi (14.460 km)
- Existed: 1948–present

Farm to Market Road 810 (FM 810) is located in Clay County. Its southern terminus is at SH 79 and SH 148 in central Petrolia. The two-lane route travels generally to the northwest, crossing the Wichita River before ending at Charlie, approximately 1 mile (1.6 km) north of FM 171.

FM 810 was previously part of SH 148. SH 148 previously continued from Petrolia northward to the Oklahoma state line, but was truncated to Charlie on August 1, 1941. The portion of SH 148 between Petrolia and Charlie was then transferred to FM 810 on August 24, 1948.

== FM 811 ==
Farm to Market Road 811
- Location: Leon County
- Length: 12.656 mi (20.368 km)
- Existed: 1948–present

Farm to Market Road 811 (FM 811) is located in Leon County. It runs from SH 7 east of Centerville to FM 1119.

FM 811 was designated on July 20, 1948, to run from SH 7 south to Guys Store. On November 24, 1959, the road was extended south 2.5 miles (4.0 km) to a road intersection. On November 3, 1972, the road was extended to FM 1119, completing its current route.

== FM 812 ==
Farm to Market Road 812
- Location: Travis and Bastrop counties
- Length: 21.272 mi (34.234 km)
- Existed: 1948–present

== FM 813 ==
Farm to Market Road 813
- Location: Ellis County
- Length: 20.73 mi (33.36 km)
- Existed: 1948–present

Farm to Market Road 813 (FM 813) is located in Ellis County.

FM 813 begins at an intersection with FM 878 in Waxahachie and runs in a slight northeast direction along Brown Street. FM 813 crosses US 287 near Waxahachie High School and runs close to several subdivisions before leaving the town. The highway runs in a northeast direction and intersects with FM 387. At an intersection with FM 983 southwest of Ferris, FM 813 turns to the southeast and runs through the town of Palmer where it meets I-45. The highway ends at an intersection with FM 660 southwest of Bristol.

FM 813 was designated on July 20, 1948, running from Rockett to Grove Creek at a distance of approximately 10 miles. On November 23 of that year, the highway was extended southwestward to US 77 in Waxahachie. On July 15, 1949, FM 813 was extended to FM 660 southwest of Bristol. The last change came on January 27, 1950, when the section between US 77 and FM 878 in Waxahachie became a part of FM 878.

Junction list

The entire route is in Ellis County.

Location	mi	km	Destinations	Notes
Waxahachie	0.0	0.0	FM 878 (Marvin Avenue)	
Waxahachie	1.6	2.6	US 287 – Fort Worth, Corsicana	
	5.6	9.0	FM 387 west to I-35E	
	8.5	13.7	FM 983 north – Ferris	
Palmer	14.5	23.3	FM 878 west (Jefferson Street) – Waxahachie	
Palmer	15.2	24.5	I-45 BL (Dallas Street) – Dallas, Ennis	
Palmer	15.5	24.9	I-45 – Dallas, Ennis	I-45 exit 259
	19.5	31.4	FM 879 west to I-45	
	20.7	33.3	FM 660 – Bristol, Crisp	
1.000 mi = 1.609 km; 1.000 km = 0.621 mi

== FM 814 ==
Farm to Market Road 814
- Location: Fannin and Grayson counties
- Length: 3.875 mi (6.236 km)
- Existed: 1948–present

Farm to Market Road 814 (FM 814) is located in Fannin and Grayson counties.

FM 814 begins at an intersection with SH 160 north of Desert. The highway travels in an eastern direction and briefly turns to the north between Grayson County Road 4460 and County Line Road. FM 814 has a brief concurrency with SH 121 in eastern Trenton before ending at an intersection with Bus. US 69/FM 815 near the town's square.

FM 814 was designated on August 26, 1948, along its current route.

Junction list

County	Location	mi	km	Destinations	Notes
Grayson		0.0	0.0	SH 160 – Blue Ridge, Whitewright	
Fannin	Trenton	3.2	5.1	SH 121 south – McKinney	West end of SH 121 overlap
Fannin	Trenton	3.3	5.3	SH 121 north – Bonham	East end of SH 121 overlap
Fannin	Trenton	3.9	6.3	Bus. US 69 / FM 815	
1.000 mi = 1.609 km; 1.000 km = 0.621 mi: Concurrency terminus

== FM 815 ==
Farm to Market Road 815
- Location: Fannin County
- Length: 4.248 mi (6.836 km)
- Existed: 1948–present

Farm to Market Road 815 (FM 815) is located in Fannin County. It runs from Bus. US 69 in Trenton south to SH 78.

FM 815 was designated on August 26, 1948, on the current route.

== FM 816 ==
Farm to Market Road 816
- Location: Fannin and Hunt counties
- Length: 10.538 mi (16.959 km)
- Existed: 1948–present

Farm to Market Road 816 (FM 816) is located in Fannin and Hunt counties. It runs from SH 34 west and north to SH 78 in Bailey.

FM 816 was designated on September 29, 1948, to run from SH 34 west to the community of Hickory Creek. On November 30, 1949, the road was extended north to SH 78 in Bailey, replacing FM 1551 and completing its current route.

== FM 817 ==
Farm to Market Road 817
- Location: Bell County
- Length: 3.154 mi (5.076 km)
- Existed: February 25, 1954–present

Farm to Market Road 817 (FM 817) is located in Bell County. It runs from FM 93 northeast to I-35/US 190 (Future I-14).

FM 817 was designated on February 25, 1954, from SH 317 in Belton, northeast over old US 81 to US 81 (now I-35) southwest of Temple. On January 31, 1974, the section from SH 317 east 0.3 miles (0.48 km) was transferred to FM 93. On October 27, 1977, a 0.2-mile (0.32 km) section along Midway Drive was added, and the old route became FM Spur 817. On June 27, 1995, the entire route was redesignated Urban Road 817 (UR 817). On June 26, 2014, the spur connection was removed from the state highway system and returned to the city of Temple. The designation of the extant portion of the route reverted to FM 817 with the elimination of the Urban Road system on November 15, 2018.

=== FM 817 (1948) ===
Farm to Market Road 817
- Location: Howard County
- Existed: June 1, 1948–October 30, 1953

A previous route numbered FM 817 was designated in Howard County on June 1, 1948, from SH 350 north of Big Spring, northward 17.5 miles (28.2 km) via Richland, to a county road intersection. On September 29, 1948, the southern terminus of FM 817 was relocated, shortening the route's length. On November 30, 1949, the road was extended north 2.1 miles (3.4 km) to the Howard/Borden County line. FM 817 was cancelled on October 30, 1953, and transferred to FM 669.

== FM 818 ==
Farm to Market Road 818
- Location: Howard County
- Length: 16.849 mi (27.116 km)
- Existed: 1948–present

Farm to Market Road 818 (FM 818) is located in Howard County. It runs from I-20 west of Big Spring south, east, north, and east to RM 33.

FM 818 was designated on March 1, 1948, to run from US 80 to Lomax. On September 26, 1954, the road was extended to RM 33, replacing FM 2128 and completing its current route.

== FM 819 ==
Farm to Market Road 819
- Location: Angelina County
- Length: 5.83 mi (9.38 km)
- Existed: June 2, 1967–present

Farm to Market Road 819 (FM 819) is located in Angelina County. It runs from Loop 287 in Lufkin to County Road 288.

FM 819 was designated on June 2, 1967, to run from US 59 northwest 0.4 miles (0.64 km) to a county road. On February 26, 1986, the road was extended northwest to Loop 287. On October 29, 1992, the road was extended southeast to FM 2108. On April 25, 2002, the road was extended to County Road 288, replacing FM 3312.

=== FM 819 (1948–1950) ===
Farm to Market Road 819
- Location: Howard County
- Existed: June 1, 1948–June 29, 1950

The first use of the FM 819 designation was in Howard County, from US 87, 13 miles (21 km) north of Big Spring, west to the Martin County line. FM 819 was cancelled on June 29, 1950, and became a portion of FM 846.

=== FM 819 (1958–1965) ===
Farm to Market Road 819
- Location: Hunt County
- Existed: February 27, 1958–May 1, 1965

The next use of the FM 819 designation was in Hunt County, from FM 513 north of Campbell southwest to FM 499 southwest of Campbell. FM 819 was cancelled on May 1, 1965, and transferred to the newly-created SH 50 (now SH 24).

== FM 820 ==
Farm to Market Road 820
- Location: Howard County
- Length: 8.073 mi (12.992 km)
- Existed: 1948–present

Farm to Market Road 820 (FM 820) is located in Howard County. It runs from I-20 in Coahoma to SH 350.

FM 820 was designated on June 1, 1948, to run from US 80 north 6.3 miles (10.1 km). On November 30, 1949, the road was extended to SH 350, completing its current route.

== FM 821 ==
Farm to Market Road 821
- Location: Glasscock and Howard counties
- Length: 23.39 mi (37.64 km)
- Existed: 1948–present

Farm to Market Road 821 (FM 821) is located in Glasscock and Howard counties. It runs from US 87 to I-20 east of Coahoma.

FM 821 was designated on June 1, 1948, to run from US 87 east 6.8 miles (10.9 km). On May 23, 1951, the road was extended northeast 3.5 miles (5.6 km). On December 17, 1952, the road was extended to US 80 (now I-20), completing its current route.

== FM 822 ==
Farm to Market Road 822
- Location: Jackson County
- Length: 16.851 mi (27.119 km)
- Existed: 1948–present

Farm to Market Road 822 (FM 822) is located in Jackson County. It runs from Loop 521 northwest and north to SH 111.

FM 822 was designated on June 1, 1948, to run from US 59 (now Loop 521) in Edna north 3.3 miles (5.3 km). This resulted in the cancellation of the original FM 235. On February 25, 1949, the road was extended 2.9 miles (4.7 km). On July 14, 1949, the road was extended 4.6 miles (7.4 km) to Navidad. On June 28, 1963, the road was extended northwest 3.6 miles (5.8 km). On May 6, 1964, the road was extended northeast to SH 111, completing its current route.

== FM 823 ==
Farm to Market Road 823
- Location: Brazos County
- Length: 1.3 mi (2.1 km)
- Existed: July 31, 2025–present

Farm to Market Road 823 (FM 823) is located in Brazos County. It runs from SH 21 in Bryan, northeastward to US 190/SH 6. It is known locally as Tabor Road.

FM 823 was designated on July 31, 2025 replacing a section of FM 974, due to one-way conversion of the US 190/SH 6 feeder road.

Junction list

The entire route is in Brazos County.

Location	mi	km	Destinations	Notes
Bryan			SH 21 (San Jacinto Ln) – Bryan, Madisonville	
Bryan			SH 6 / US 190 (Earl Rudder Frwy) – Hearne, College Station	Interchange; future I-14
1.000 mi = 1.609 km; 1.000 km = 0.621 mi

=== FM 823 (1948) ===
Farm to Market Road 823
- Location: Jefferson County
- Existed: January 27, 1948–March 26, 2009

The original FM 823 was designated on January 27, 1948 from SH 73 to Port Acres. On December 17, 1952 FM 823 was extended southeastward 0.5 miles (0.80 km). On May 27, 1992, FM 823 was extended north to FM 365. On August 26, 1993, the section north of SH 73 was transferred to the new Spur 93. On June 27, 1995, the entire route was redesignated Urban Road 823 (UR 823). The route was cancelled on March 26, 2009 and removed from the highway system.

A second route designated FM 823 was erroneously designated on October 27, 2005, in Brown County. As the route in Jefferson County existed at the time, this route was renumbered to FM 2376 on March 30, 2006.

== FM 824 ==
Farm to Market Road 824
- Location: Fannin and Lamar counties
- Length: 15.254 mi (24.549 km)
- Existed: 1948–present

Farm to Market Road 824 (FM 824) is located in Fannin and Lamar counties. It runs from SH 56 in Honey Grove to FM 137.

FM 824 was designated on September 29, 1948, to run from Honey Grove southeast via Dial to the Fannin/Lamar County Line. On August 25, 1949, the road was extended to FM 137, completing its current route.

== FM 825 ==
Farm to Market Road 825
- Location: Dawson County
- Length: 2.906 mi (4.677 km)
- Existed: 1948–present

Farm to Market Road 825 (FM 825) is located in Dawson County. It runs from US 87 northeast of Lamesa eastward 3.0 miles (4.8 km) to a road intersection.

FM 825 was designated on September 29, 1948, to run from US 87 east 2.0 miles (3.2 km). On April 21, 1949, the road was extended east to its current terminus.

== FM 826 ==
Farm to Market Road 826
- Location: Dawson County
- Length: 1.791 mi (2.882 km)
- Existed: 1948–present

Farm to Market Road 826 (FM 826) is located in Dawson County. It runs from BU 87-K east 2.5 miles (4.0 km).

FM 826 was designated on September 29, 1948, on the current route.

== FM 827 ==
Farm to Market Road 827
- Location: Dawson County
- Length: 6.313 mi (10.160 km)
- Existed: 1948–present

Farm to Market Road 827 (FM 827) is located in Dawson County. It runs from BU 87-K east to FM 178.

FM 827 was designated on September 29, 1948, to run from US 87 (later SL 218, now BU 87-K) east 4.5 miles (7.2 km) to McCarty School. On May 2, 1962, the road was extended east 4.1 miles (6.6 km). On May 31, 1966, a 2.0 miles (3.2 km) section was transferred to FM 178 when that road was extended north.

== FM 828 ==
Farm to Market Road 828
- Location: Dawson County
- Length: 13.839 mi (22.272 km)
- Existed: 1948–present

Farm to Market Road 828 (FM 828) is located in Dawson County. It runs from Patricia east to US 87. There is a concurrency with FM 829.

FM 828 was designated on September 29, 1948, to run from SH 137 west 3.0 miles (4.8 km) to Klondike School. On November 20, 1951, the road was extended east to FM 26. On October 26, 1954, the road was extended in both directions: east to US 87, and west 3.8 miles (6.1 km) to Patricia, completing its current route.

== FM 829 ==
Farm to Market Road 829
- Location: Dawson and Martin counties
- Length: 60.992 mi (98.157 km)
- Existed: 1948–present

Farm to Market Road 829 (FM 829) is located in Dawson and Martin counties. It runs from SH 137 in Welch to I-20.

FM 829 was designated on September 29, 1948, to run from SH 137 to SH 328 (now SH 83) in Welch. On September 20, 1961, the road was extended south to FM 87 (now SH 176), replacing a section of FM 1064 and all of FM 1718. On July 25, 1963 (connecting section designated June 28), the road was extended to US 80 (now I-20), replacing the FM 1212 spur connection and part of FM 1212 itself.

== FM 830 ==
Farm to Market Road 830
- Location: Montgomery County
- Length: 6.154 mi (9.904 km)
- Existed: June 28, 1963–present

Farm to Market Road 830 (FM 830), also known as 7 Coves Road, is located in Montgomery County. It begins at an intersection with TX-75 and follows a path westward, crossing over I-45 just north of Panorama Village. It continues in a generally west-northwest direction, intersecting Old Montgomery Road and Cude Cemetery Road before terminating at a roundabout on Lake Conroe.

FM 830 was designated on June 28, 1963, to run from (formerly US Route 75) (now TX-75) to I-45. On June 2, 1967, the road was extended to Lake Conroe, completing its current route.

The route provides access to many neighborhoods on or near Lake Conroe from I-45 or TX-75.

=== FM 830 (1948) ===
Farm to Market Road 830
- Location: Val Verde County
- Existed: September 29, 1948–September 23, 1959

A previous route numbered FM 830 was designated on September 29, 1948, from US 90, 2.5 miles (4.0 km) east of Del Rio, north to Val Verde County Airport. FM 830 was cancelled on September 23, 1959, and removed from the highway system when the airport ceased operations.

== FM 831 ==
Farm to Market Road 831
- Location: Leon County
- Length: 20.748 mi (33.391 km)
- Existed: 1948–present

Farm to Market Road 831 (FM 831) is located in Leon County. It runs from FM 542 at Oakwood south and west to SH 75.

FM 831 was designated on July 20, 1948, to run from FM 542 in Oakwood via FLo to Russell. On August 25, 1949, the road was extended 3.0 miles (4.8 km) to Nineveh. On May 2, 1962, the road was extended east to another point on FM 542. On January 20, 1970, FM 831 was rerouted replacing FM 1511 west of Flo, with the section from Flo to Russell becoming part of new FM 1511 and the section from Russell to FM 542 renumbered FM 3178.

== FM 832 ==
Farm to Market Road 832
- Location: Leon County
- Length: 1.251 mi (2.013 km)
- Existed: 1948–present

Farm to Market Road 832 (FM 832) is located in Leon County. It runs from US 79 to Keechi.

FM 832 was designated on July 20, 1948, on the current route.

== FM 833 ==
Farm to Market Road 833
- Location: Freestone County
- Length: 14.299 mi (23.012 km)
- Existed: 1948–present

Farm to Market Road 833 (FM 833) is located in Freestone County. It runs from FM 80 to FM 2570.

FM 833 was designated on September 27, 1948, to run from US 75 (now SH 75) north of Fairfield north to Steward's Mill. On October 26, 1954, the road was extended west to another point on US 75 (now SH 75). On November 24, 1959, the road was extended west to FM 80. On October 27, 1970, the road was rerouted over old FM 2547 east of Steward's Mill to FM 488, while the old route south of Steward's Mill was renumbered as new FM 2547. On January 23, 1984, the road was extended to FM 2570, completing its current route, due to closure of FM 1124 from near Young Community to FM 2570 (which was extended south over the separated part of FM 1124).

== FM 834 ==
Farm to Market Road 834
- Location: Liberty County
- Length: 12.045 mi (19.385 km)
- Existed: 1948–present

Farm to Market Road 834 (FM 834) is located in Liberty County. It runs from a road intersection east and south to FM 770.

FM 834 was designated on September 29, 1948, to run from SH 146 in Hardin to FM 770 in Hull. On December 18, 1959, the road was extended west to a road intersection, replacing a section of FM 1011 and all of FM 1411. On September 30, 1970, the road was extended south over old FM 770, completing its current route.

== FM 835 ==
Farm to Market Road 835
- Location: Lubbock County
- Length: 10.704 mi (17.226 km)
- Existed: 1948–present

Farm to Market Road 835 (FM 835) is located in the Lubbock metropolitan area.

FM 835 begins at an intersection with Avenue A in eastern Lubbock. The highway travels eastward along 34th Street until an interchange with Martin Luther King Jr. Boulevard, where FM 835 turns southeast with 34th Street becoming Southeast Drive. FM 835 turns east at 50th Street, where it intersects with Spur 331. FM 835 runs east along 50th Street and crosses Loop 289 before leaving the city limits of Lubbock. The highway turns south at an intersection with FM 1729/FM 3523 near Ransom Canyon and Buffalo Springs Lake. FM 835 runs south and passes just west of Buffalo Springs Lake, where the highway briefly runs through a canyon. FM 835 continues to run south before ending at an intersection with US 84 northwest of Slaton.

FM 835 was first designated on September 29, 1948, running from US 84 near Slaton to US 84 near Lubbock, now Spur 331. On October 30, 1957, the highway was extended further northwest to Avenue A, which was then the current route of US 87 in Lubbock. On June 27, 1995, the section of FM 835 from Avenue A in Lubbock to Loop 289 was redesignated Urban Road 835 (UR 835). On February 25, 2010, the section from Spur 331 via Southeast Drive and 34th Street to Bus. US 87 was cancelled, and FM 835 was instead extended via 50th Street to I-27. The designation of the route reverted to FM 835 with the elimination of the Urban Road system on November 15, 2018.

Junction list

The entire route is in Lubbock County.

Location	mi	km	Destinations	Notes
Lubbock	0.0	0.0	Avenue A	
Lubbock	1.0	1.6	Martin Luther King Jr. Boulevard	Interchange
Lubbock	2.3	3.7	Spur 331 south (Southeast Drive)	
Lubbock	3.2	5.1	Loop 289 (East Loop)	
	6.6	10.6	FM 1279 north / FM 3523 east – Ransom Canyon	
	10.7	17.2	US 84 – Slaton, Lubbock	
1.000 mi = 1.609 km; 1.000 km = 0.621 mi

== FM 836 ==
Farm to Market Road 836
- Location: Dickens and Crosby counties
- Length: 21.297 mi (34.274 km)
- Existed: 1948–present

Farm to Market Road 836 (FM 836) is located in Dickens and Crosby counties. It runs from Loop 21 in Spur northwest 21.3 miles (34.3 km) to a point north of US 82.

FM 836 was designated on November 6, 1948, to run from Loop 21 in Spur to the State Experimental Farm as a replacement for Spur 111. On November 23, 1949, the road was extended in length to 8.9 miles (14.3 km), and the old route to the State Experimental Farm became a spur connection. On November 21, 1957 (connecting section designated October 31), the road was extended to its current end at a point north of US 82, replacing FM 1470. On January 28, 1969, the spur connection became part of FM 2794.

== FM 837 ==
Farm to Market Road 837
- Location: Anderson County
- Length: 25.758 mi (41.453 km)
- Existed: May 23, 1951–present

Farm to Market Road 837 (FM 837) is located in Anderson County. It runs from FM 860 north and east to SH 155.

FM 837 was designated on May 23, 1951, to run from FM 315 (the end point of the original FM 837) at Brushy Creek northeast to SH 155. On December 20, 1954, the road was extended to FM 860 in Blackfoot, replacing FM 1989 and completing its current route.

=== FM 837 (1948) ===
Farm to Market Road 837
- Location: Anderson County
- Existed: October 29, 1948–July 14, 1949

A previous route numbered FM 837 was designated on October 29, 1948, from SH 155 north of Palestine to Brushy Creek. FM 837 was cancelled on July 14, 1949, and became a portion of FM 315.

== FM 838 ==
Farm to Market Road 838
- Location: Smith and Rusk counties
- Length: 4.669 mi (7.514 km)
- Existed: 1948–present

Farm to Market Road 838 (FM 838) is located in Smith and Rusk counties. It runs from SH 135 northeast of Arp to SH 323 in London.

FM 838 was designated on October 29, 1948, on the current route.

== FM 839 ==
Farm to Market Road 839
- Location: Rusk County
- Length: 19.268 mi (31.009 km)
- Existed: 1948–present

Farm to Market Road 839 (FM 839) is located in Rusk County. It runs from US 79 near Henderson to US 84 near Reklaw, with a spur connection to New Salem.

FM 839 was designated on October 29, 1948, to run from US 79 to New Salem. On July 24, 1949, the road was extended to US 84. On February 28, 1952, a spur connection on the old route to New Salem was added.

== FM 840 ==
Farm to Market Road 840
- Location: Rusk County
- Length: 14.546 mi (23.410 km)
- Existed: October 29, 1948–present

Farm to Market Road 840 (FM 840) is a 14.5-mile (23.3 km) route in Rusk County. It connects SH 315 southeast of Brachfield with US 79 and Bus. US 79 in Henderson.

FM 840 was designated on October 29, 1948, from Loop 153 (now Bus. US 79) & US 79 in Henderson to Brachfield. It was extended to SH 315 on July 14, 1949.

== FM 841 ==
Farm to Market Road 841
- Location: Angelina County
- Length: 5.091 mi (8.193 km)
- Existed: 1948–present

Farm to Market Road 841 (FM 841) is located in Angelina County. It runs from FM 325 in Lufkin east to Macedonia Church and south to US 69.

FM 841 was designated on October 29, 1948, on the current route.

== FM 842 ==
Farm to Market Road 842
- Location: Angelina County
- Length: 8.161 mi (13.134 km)
- Existed: 1948–present

Farm to Market Road 842 (FM 842) is located in Angelina County. It runs from SH 103 east of Lufkin northeast 8.1 miles (13.0 km).

FM 842 was designated on October 29, 1948, to run from SH 103 east of Lufkin northeast 4.5 miles (7.2 km) to Moffett School. On May 5, 1966, the road was extended east to its current end.

== FM 843 ==
Farm to Market Road 843
- Location: Angelina County
- Length: 6.669 mi (10.733 km)
- Existed: 1948–present

Farm to Market Road 843 (FM 843) is located in Angelina County. It runs from US 69 near Central north and east to US 59.

FM 843 was designated on October 29, 1948, to run from US 69 north and east to Allentown Church. On July 14, 1949, the road was extended east to US 59, completing its current route.

== FM 844 ==
Farm to Market Road 844
- Location: Angelina County
- Length: 9.246 mi (14.880 km)
- Existed: 1948–present

Farm to Market Road 844 (FM 844) is located in Angelina County. It runs from US 69 south of Huntington south 9.2 miles (14.8 km) to a county road south of Manning Community.

FM 844 was designated on October 29, 1948, to run from US 69 south to Flournoy Community. On December 17, 1952, the road was extended south 4.8 miles (7.7 km) to a county road. On May 31, 1957, the road was extended northwest over the old route of US 69 to the new route.

== FM 845 ==
Farm to Market Road 845
- Location: Milam County
- Length: 2.475 mi (3.983 km)
- Existed: December 3, 1954–present

Farm to Market Road 845 (FM 845) is located in Milam County. It runs from US 190 in Cameron to FM 1600. It is the old route of US 190.

FM 845 was designated on December 3, 1954, on the current route.

=== FM 845 (1948–1949) ===
Farm to Market Road 845
- Location: Culberson County
- Existed: October 29, 1948–September 28, 1949

The first use of the FM 845 designation was in Culberson County, from SH 54 at Van Horn east to Culberson County Airport. FM 845 was cancelled on September 28, 1949, as the county refused to enter an agreement covering construction.

=== FM 845 (1951–1952) ===
Farm to Market Road 845
- Location: Sherman County
- Existed: May 23, 1951–September 17, 1952

The second use of the FM 845 designation was in Sherman County, from FM 289 (now SH 15), 14 miles (23 km) east of Stratford, south 7.0 miles (11.3 km) to a road intersection. Seven months later the road was extended 6.0 miles (9.7 km) south to FM 1573. FM 845 was cancelled on September 17, 1952, and transferred to FM 119.

=== FM 845 (1953–1954) ===
Farm to Market Road 845
- Location: Smith County
- Existed: October 29, 1953–December 10, 1954

The third use of the FM 845 designation was in Smith County, from SH 31 west of Tyler north and east to FM 1803 northeast of Tyler. On October 26, 1954, the road was extended 8 miles (13 km) south, east and north to SH 64/FM 1803 east of Tyler, forming a partial loop. FM 845 was cancelled two months later and became a portion of FM 1803 (now Loop 323).

== FM 846 ==
Farm to Market Road 846
- Location: Martin and Howard counties
- Length: 39.373 mi (63.365 km)
- Existed: 1948–present

Farm to Market Road 846 (FM 846) is located in Martin and Howard counties. It runs from SH 137 east to FM 1205 in Vincent.

FM 846 was designated on October 29, 1948, to run from SH 137 east 9.1 miles (14.6 km) to a road intersection. On June 28, 1950, the road was extended east to US 87, replacing FM 819. On October 31, 1958, the road was extended to FM 669. On December 31, 1959, the road was extended to FM 1205 in Vincent, replacing FM 2032 and creating a concurrency with FM 669.

== FM 847 ==
Farm to Market Road 847
- Location: Erath County
- Length: 10.539 mi (16.961 km)
- Existed: October 13, 1954–present

Farm to Market Road 847 (FM 847) is located in Erath County. It runs from SH 6 in Dublin to FM 914 near Stephenville.

FM 847 was designated on October 13, 1954, on the current route.

=== FM 847 (1948) ===
Farm to Market Road 847
- Location: Pecos County
- Existed: October 29, 1948–July 30, 1951

The first route numbered FM 847 was designated in Pecos County on October 29, 1948, from US 290 at Bakersfield north to US 67 near Girvin. FM 847 was cancelled on July 30, 1951, and became a portion of FM 11.

=== FM 847 (1951) ===
Farm to Market Road 847
- Location: Terry County
- Existed: July 25, 1951–February 24, 1953

The second use of the FM 847 designation was in Terry County, from US 380 at Gomez north and west to a road intersection. The road was numbered five days after designation. On November 20 of that same year the road was extended 3 miles (4.8 km) south to another road intersection. On December 17, 1952, the road was extended 3.2 miles (5.1 km) to US 62. FM 847 was cancelled on February 24, 1953, and transferred to FM 300.

== FM 848 ==
Farm to Market Road 848
- Location: Smith County
- Length: 7.457 mi (12.001 km)
- Existed: 1948–present

Farm to Market Road 848 (FM 848) is located in Smith County. It runs from SH 64 near Tyler to FM 346 in Whitehouse.

FM 848 was designated on October 29, 1948, on the current route.

== FM 849 ==
Farm to Market Road 849
- Location: Smith County
- Length: 5.394 mi (8.681 km)
- Existed: 1948–present

Farm to Market Road 849 (FM 849) is located in Smith County. It runs from FM 16 in Lyndale to SH 110 near Mount Sylvan.

FM 849 was designated on October 29, 1948, on the current route.

== FM 850 ==
Farm to Market Road 850
- Location: Smith and Rusk counties
- Length: 31.967 mi (51.446 km)
- Existed: October 29, 1948–present

Farm to Market Road 850 (FM 850) is a 31.967-mile (51.446 km) state road in Smith and Rusk counties that connects Farm to Market Road 2767 (east of Tyler) with Texas State Highway 135 in Overton.

FM 850 was designated on October 29, 1948, to run from SH 31 (later FM 2767, now CR 2347) east of Tyler southeast to New Zion Church. On May 23, 1951, the road was extended east to SH 135. On October 26, 1951, the road was extended east to SH 259 (now SH 42). On August 24, 1955, the road was extended east to SH 26 (now US 259). On October 31, 1958, the road was extended east to FM 2276. On December 20, 1963, the road was extended southeast to SH 322. The final change occurred on September 26, 2005, when the road was extended northwest to the new location of FM 2767 when that highway was rerouted.

== FM 851 ==
Farm to Market Road 851
- Location: Cherokee County
- Length: 10.216 mi (16.441 km)
- Existed: 1948–present

Farm to Market Road 851 (FM 851) is located in Cherokee County. It runs from US 69 in Alto to FM 343 near Atoy.

FM 851 was designated on October 29, 1948, from SH 21 in Alto to FM 343. The point of beginning was moved to US 69 on February 25, 1949.

== FM 852 ==
Farm to Market Road 852
- Location: Hopkins, Wood, and Upshur counties
- Length: 32.436 mi (52.201 km)
- Existed: 1948–present

Farm to Market Road 852 (FM 852) is located in Hopkins, Wood, and Upshur counties. It runs from FM 269 to SH 154 in Gilmer.

FM 852 was designated on October 29, 1948, to run from FM 312 in Winnsboro southeast to Perryville. On July 2, 1951, the road was extended east to US 271 in Bettie, replacing FM 645. On October 31, 1957, the road was extended northwest to FM 270 (now FM 269), creating concurrencies with FM 312 and SH 11. On April 28, 1959, the section from FM 312 to FM 69 (now FM 515) in Winnsboro was cancelled, resulting in new concurrencies with FM 69 (now FM 515) and SH 37. On June 19, 1967, the section east of Perryville became part of FM 2088 when that road was extended, and FM 852 was rerouted to end at SH 154 in Gilmer, replacing FM 553.

== RM 853 ==
Ranch to Market Road 853
- Location: Irion and Tom Green counties
- Length: 28.024 mi (45.100 km)
- Existed: October 29, 1948 (Note: RM 853 was originally designated as FM 853 from 1948 to 1959.)–present

Ranch to Market Road 853 (RM 853) is located in Irion and Tom Green counties. It runs from US 67 northeast of Mertzon north and east to Bus. US 67-H southwest of San Angelo.

RM 853 was designated on October 29, 1948, as Farm to Market Road 853 (FM 853), running from US 67 (later Loop 545, now BU 67-H) southwest of San Angelo to the Irion/Tom Green County Line. On July 14, 1949, the road was extended east and south to US 67 near Mertzon, replacing FM 862. FM 853 was changed to RM 853 on November 13, 1959. On June 27, 1995, the section from FM 2288 to Loop 545 (which was redesignated Bus. US 67-H 17 months later) was internally redesignated as Urban Road 853 (UR 853), but this section was changed back to RM 853 on November 15, 2018.

== FM 854 ==
Farm to Market Road 854
- Location: Bosque County
- Length: 1.022 mi (1.645 km)
- Existed: November 24, 1959–present

Farm to Market Road 854 (FM 854) is located in Bosque County. It runs from SH 6 near Valley mills north to FM 217.

FM 854 was designated on November 24, 1959, on the current route.

=== FM 854 (1948) ===
Farm to Market Road 854
- Location: Cherokee County
- Existed: October 29, 1948–April 21, 1958

A previous route numbered FM 854 was designated on October 29, 1948, from SH 110 in Rusk to FM 22 in Gallatin. FM 854 was cancelled on April 21, 1958, and transferred to FM 768.

== FM 855 ==
Farm to Market Road 855
- Location: Cherokee County
- Length: 11.644 mi (18.739 km)
- Existed: 1948–present

Farm to Market Road 855 (FM 855) is located in Cherokee County. It runs from US 175 in Cuney to US 69 in Mount Selman.

FM 855 was designated on October 29, 1948, from US 69 at Mount Selman westward 5.2 miles (8.4 km). On November 20, 1951, it was extended to its current western terminus at US 175 in Cuney.

Junction list

The entire route is in Cherokee County.

Location	mi	km	Destinations	Notes
Cuney	0.0	0.0	US 175 – Jacksonville, Frankston	Western terminus
	2.8	4.5	FM 3198 – Lake Palestine	
	3.8	6.1	FM 346 – Teaselville, Flint	
	4.8	7.7	FM 2137 – Bullard	
Mount Selman	11.6	18.7	US 69 – Tyler, Jacksonville	Eastern terminus
1.000 mi = 1.609 km; 1.000 km = 0.621 mi

== FM 856 ==
Farm to Market Road 856
- Location: Cherokee County
- Length: 8.909 mi (14.338 km)
- Existed: October 29, 1948–present

Farm to Market Road 856 (FM 856) is a 8.909-mile (14.338 km) state road in Cherokee County that connects U.S. Route 79 (east-northeast of New Summerfield) with Farm to Market Road 13 in Henrys Chapel.

FM 856 was designated on October 29, 1948, to run from US 79 north to Concord. On July 14, 1949, the road was extended to FM 13, completing its current route.

== FM 857 ==
Farm to Market Road 857
- Location: Van Zandt and Smith counties
- Length: 8.935 mi (Note: The certified length given is shorter than the actual mileage, as the Texas Department of Transportation description of FM 857 considers it to be discontinuous at rather than concurrent with FM 1255 in Sand Flat.) (14.379 km)
- Existed: 1948–present

Farm to Market Road 857 (FM 857) is located in Van Zandt and Smith counties.

FM 857 begins at an intersection with US 80 in Grand Saline. The highway travels in a southeast direction passing by the salt prairie the town derives its name from. FM 857 continues to run in a southeast direction and reaches the town of Sand Flat where it has a brief overlap with FM 1255. Leaving Sand Flat, the highway travels in a mostly eastern direction before reaching its terminus at FM 1253.

FM 857 was designated on October 29, 1948, running from US 80 southeastward to Sand Flat. FM 857 was extended eastward to its current terminus at FM 1253 on September 27, 1960.

Junction list

County	Location	mi	km	Destinations	Notes
Van Zandt	Grand Saline	0.0	0.0	US 80 – Mineola, Wills Point	
Van Zandt		4.6	7.4	FM 1255 south – Van, Canton	West end of FM 1255 overlap
Van Zandt		4.7	7.6	FM 1255 north – Silver Lake	East end of FM 1255 overlap
Smith		9.1	14.6	FM 1253 – Mineola, Jamestown	
1.000 mi = 1.609 km; 1.000 km = 0.621 mi: Concurrency terminus

== FM 858 ==
Farm to Market Road 858
- Location: Van Zandt County
- Length: 15.387 mi (24.763 km)
- Existed: 1948–present

Farm to Market Road 858 (FM 858) is located in Van Zandt County. It runs from SH 19 south of Canton to FM 314.

FM 858 was designated on October 29, 1948, to run from SH 19 east to Martin's Mill. On July 14, 1949, the road was extended to FM 314, completing its current route.

== FM 859 ==
Farm to Market Road 859
- Location: Van Zandt County
- Length: 16.55 mi (26.63 km)
- Existed: 1948–present

Farm to Market Road 859 (FM 859) is located in Van Zandt County. It runs from SH 19 northeast of Edgewood to SH 64 in Canton.

FM 859 was designated on October 29, 1948, to run from US 80 in Edgewood northeast 4.3 miles (6.9 km) to Small. On July 14, 1949, the road was extended southwest 3.6 miles (5.8 km) to Bethlehem School, but that extension was renumbered FM 1504 on September 29, 1949. FM 859 was instead rerouted to SH 64 in Canton, replacing FM 1257. On November 20, 1951, the road was extended northeast to SH 19, completing its current route.

== FM 860 ==
Farm to Market Road 860
- Location: Anderson County
- Length: 11.597 mi (18.664 km)
- Existed: 1948–present

Farm to Market Road 860 (FM 860) is located in Anderson County. It runs from SH 19 west and south to US 287.

FM 860 was designated on October 29, 1948, to run from SH 19 to Blackfoot. On July 14, 1949, the road was extended to US 287, completing its current route.

== FM 861 ==
Farm to Market Road 861
- Location: Anderson County
- Length: 5.09 mi (8.19 km)
- Existed: 1948–present

Farm to Market Road 861 (FM 861) is located in Anderson County. It runs from SH 294 in Elkhart to FM 319.

FM 861 was designated on October 29, 1948, to run from SH 294 in Elkhart to Old Pilgrim Church. On May 5, 1966, the road was extended to FM 319, completing its current route.

== FM 862 ==
Farm to Market Road 862
- Location: Uvalde County
- Length: 0.753 mi (1,212 m)
- Existed: August 1, 1962–present

Farm to Market Road 862 (FM 862) is located in Uvalde County. It runs from US 83 & Studer Street east to FM 1023.

FM 862 was designated on August 1, 1962, on the current route.

=== FM 862 (1948–1949) ===
Farm to Market Road 862
- Location: Irion County
- Existed: October 29, 1948–July 14, 1949

The first use of the FM 862 designation was in Irion County, from US 67, 3.5 miles (5.6 km) north of Mertzon, northward 9.0 miles (14.5 km). FM 862 was cancelled nine months later and became a portion of FM 853 (now RM 853).

=== FM 862 (1951–1962) ===
Farm to Market Road 862
- Location: Red River County
- Existed: June 21, 1951–May 2, 1962

The second use of the FM 862 designation was in Red River County, from SH 37 near Albion west to Blakeney. On August 24, 1955, the road was extended northwest 1 mile (1.6 km). On November 9, 1960, a 2.4-mile (3.9 km) section from near Blakeney Community east to SH 37 was transferred to FM 195. The remainder of FM 862 was cancelled on May 24, 1962, and transferred to FM 410.

== FM 863 ==
Farm to Market Road 863 (FM 863) is a designation that has been used twice. No highway currently uses the FM 863 designation.

=== FM 863 (1948–1953) ===
Farm to Market Road 863
- Location: Mason County
- Existed: October 29, 1948–November 13, 1953

The first use of the FM 863 designation was in Mason County, from US 87 near Beaver Creek south to Hilda. FM 863 was cancelled on October 28, 1953, and transferred to FM 648 (now RM 783).

=== FM 863 (1953–1990) ===
Farm to Market Road 863
- Location: Webb, LaSalle, and Duval counties
- Existed: October 28, 1953–August 29, 1990

The second use of the FM 863 designation was in Webb, LaSalle and Duval counties, from the Webb–LaSalle county line east via Encinal and southeast to SH 202 (now US 59) west of Freer as a replacement of a section of FM 133. On September 21, 1955, a 9.8-mile (15.8 km) section from US 83 east to the Webb–LaSalle county line was added. On January 22, 1958, FM 863 was signed, but not designated, as part of SH 44. FM 863 was cancelled on August 29, 1990 as the SH 44 designation became official.

== RM 864 ==
Ranch to Market Road 864
- Location: Sutton, Schleicher, and Menard counties
- Length: 42.125 mi (67.794 km)
- Existed: October 29, 1948 (Note: RM 864 was originally designated as FM 864 from 1948 to 1959.)–present

Ranch to Market Road 864 (RM 864) is located in Sutton, Schleicher, and Menard counties. It runs from US 190 west of Menard to Spur 467 in Sonora.

RM 864 was designated on October 29, 1948, as Farm to Market Road 864 (FM 864), running from SH 151 (later SH 29, now US 190) south 3.8 miles (6.1 km) to Fort McKavett. On April 23, 1949, the point of beginning was moved east 4.0 miles (6.4 km) and the length was increased to 5.5 miles (8.9 km). On October 26, 1954, the road was extended to the Menard/Schleicher County Line, as Schleicher County did not accept the minute order extending it to FM 1962 at the Sutton County Line. On August 24, 1955, Schleicher County and TXDOT made an agreement, so the road was extended to US 290 (now Spur 467), replacing FM 1962. On November 13, 1959, the road was changed to RM 864.

== FM 865 ==
Farm to Market Road 865
- Location: Brazoria and Harris counties
- Length: 10.117 mi (16.282 km)
- Existed: September 13, 1984–present

Farm to Market Road 865 (FM 865) is located in Harris and Brazoria counties.

FM 865 begins at FM 518 in Pearland. It continues into Harris County, straddling the Houston city limits as it intersects the Sam Houston Tollway (Beltway 8). The route then runs through southern Houston before intersecting I-610. FM 865 then crosses railroad tracks before ending at US 90 Alt. Cullen Boulevard continues as a city street from here to Brays Bayou.

The current FM 865 was established on September 13, 1984, along its current route. Its mileage was transferred from FM 518 as part of a realignment of the latter onto the routing of the canceled FM 3344. On June 27, 1995, the entire route was redesignated Urban Road 865 (UR 865). The designation reverted to FM 865 with the elimination of the Urban Road system on November 15, 2018.

=== FM 865 (1948–1951) ===
Farm to Market Road 865
- Location: Schleicher County
- Existed: October 29, 1948–July 14, 1949

The first use of the FM 865 designation was in Schleicher County, from US 277 in El Dorado to a point 8.0 miles (12.9 km) west. FM 865 was cancelled on July 14, 1949, and became a portion of RM 33 (now US 190).

=== FM 865/RM 865 (1951–1984) ===
Ranch to Market Road 865
- Location: Crockett County
- Existed: May 23, 1951 (Note: RM 865 was previously designated as FM 865 from 1951 to 1959.)–May 16, 1984

The next use of the FM 865 designation was in Crockett County, from SH 163, 2.5 miles (4.0 km) north of Ozona, to the Vaughn Oil Field. On November 20, 1951, the designation was extended 9.2 miles (14.8 km) to RM 33 (now US 190). On December 15, 1959, the designation was changed to Ranch to Market Road 865 (RM 865). In 1969, the route was signed, but not designated, as SH 137. RM 865 was cancelled on May 16, 1984, as the SH 137 designation became official.

== FM 866 ==
Farm to Market Road 866
- Location: Ector County
- Length: 16.131 mi (25.960 km)
- Existed: 1948–present

Farm to Market Road 866 (FM 866) is located in Ector County. It runs from SH 158 in Goldsmith south to a county road.

FM 866 was designated on October 29, 1948, to run from US 80 (now I-20) in Duro north to SH 302. On July 15, 1949, the point of beginning moved to 1 mile (1.6 km) west of Duro and the road was lengthened 0.2 miles (0.32 km) as a result. On October 28, 1953, the road was extended north to Goldsmith, at what would later become the route of SH 158. On February 15, 1959, the road was extended south 0.4 miles (0.64 km) to a county road. On June 27, 1995, the section south of SH 302 was internally designated as Urban Road 866 (UR 866), but this section was reverted to FM 866 on November 15, 2018.

== FM 867 ==
Farm to Market Road 867
- Location: Loving County
- Length: 2.113 mi (3.401 km)
- Existed: 1948–present

Farm to Market Road 867 (FM 867) is located in Loving County. It runs from an irrigation pump station 0.3 miles (0.48 km) north of SH 302 southwest of Mentone south and west 2.1 miles (3.4 km).

FM 867 was designated on October 29, 1948, on the current route.

== FM 868 ==
Farm to Market Road 868
- Location: Midland County
- Length: 1.975 mi (3.178 km)
- Existed: 1948–present

Farm to Market Road 868 (FM 868) is located in Midland County. It runs from Bus. SH 158 north to Loop 250.

FM 868 was designated on October 29, 1948, to run from SH 158 (later Loop 546, now Bus. SH 158) north and east to SH 349. On September 21, 1955, the road was extended east and south to US 80, but that extension was cancelled on December 13, 1956 in exchange for extending FM 1213. On July 24, 1984, a 3.7 miles (6.0 km) section (along with all of FM 1369 was redesignated as part of Loop 250. On June 26, 1995, the road was internally redesignated as Urban Road 868 (UR 868) The designation reverted to FM 868 on November 15, 2018.

== FM 869 ==
Farm to Market Road 869
- Location: Reeves County
- Length: 13.804 mi (22.215 km)
- Existed: 1948–present

Farm to Market Road 869 (FM 869) is located in Reeves County. Its southern terminus is at SH 17, 14.5 miles (23.3 km) south of Pecos. The two-lane road immediately crosses the Pecos Valley Southern Railway and proceeds to the west for about 2 miles (3.2 km), then turns north. It intersects FM 1934, then runs to the northwest before reaching its northern terminus at I-20 exit 33.

FM 869 was designated on October 29, 1948, along the current route. Until 1991, the road's northern terminus was at US 80, the progenitor route of I-20 in western Texas.

== FM 870 ==
Farm to Market Road 870
- Location: Crane and Upton counties
- Existed: October 29, 1948–August 29, 1990

Farm to Market Road 870 (FM 870) was located in Crane and Upton counties.

FM 870 was designated on October 29, 1948, from US 67 in Rankin northwest 8.8 miles (14.2 km) to a road intersection. On May 23, 1951, the road was extended northwest 8.8 miles (14.2 km). The road was extended another 11.6 miles (18.7 km) to the Crane County line on December 18, 1951. The same day the road was extended 2.7 miles (4.3 km) to SH 51 (now US 385). On May 21, 1953, FM 870 was signed (but not designated) as SH 329. FM 870 was cancelled on August 29, 1990 as the SH 329 designation became official.

== FM 871 ==
Farm to Market Road 871
- Location: Ward County
- Length: 4.192 mi (6.746 km)
- Existed: 1948–present

Farm to Market Road 871 (FM 871) is located in Ward County. It runs from a road intersection north of FM 11 southeast of Grandfalls southward 2.3 miles (3.7 km) to another road intersection south of FM 11.

FM 871 was designated on October 29, 1948, to run from a county road intersection 1.0 mile (1.6 km) north of the Pecos River northeast 4.2 miles (6.8 km), but this was corrected on January 21, 1949, so that the road was 3.9 miles (6.3 km), and the intersection point with FM 11 was moved east. On April 28, 1950, the road was extended northeast 0.5 miles (0.80 km) to a road intersection, completing its current route.

== FM 872 ==
Farm to Market Road 872
- Location: Ward County
- Length: 0.851 mi (1,370 m)
- Existed: April 28, 1950–present

Farm to Market Road 872 (FM 872) is located in Ward County. It runs from FM 871 southwest 0.8 miles (1.3 km).

FM 872 was designated on April 28, 1950, on the current route.

=== FM 872 (1948) ===
Farm to Market Road 872
- Location: Ward County
- Existed: October 29, 1948–April 28, 1950

A previous route numbered FM 872 was designated on October 29, 1948, from FM 871 to a point 1 mile (1.6 km) northwest; although this was corrected four months later to go from FM 871 northwest 1.3 miles (2.1 km) to FM 11. FM 872 was cancelled on April 28, 1950, in exchange for extending FM 871 and creating the current FM 872.

== FM 873 ==
Farm to Market Road 873
- Location: Ward County
- Length: 5.663 mi (9.114 km)
- Existed: October 29, 1948–present

Farm to Market Road 873 (FM 873) is located in Ward County. From its western terminus at FM 3398, it runs southeast 5.7 miles (9.2 km) to Barstow, reaching its eastern terminus at FM 516 in the center of the city.

FM 873 was designated on October 29, 1948, from a county road (which would be designated FM 3398 in 1977) via Barstow to a point southeast of the city. The southernmost 2.4 miles (3.9 km) became part of FM 516 on January 22, 1949.

== FM 874 ==
Farm to Market Road 874
- Location: Winkler County
- Length: 17.687 mi (28.464 km)
- Existed: 1948–present

Farm to Market Road 874 (FM 874) is located in Winkler County. It runs from SH 115 northeast of Kermit west and south to SH 302 southwest of Kermit.

FM 874 was designated on October 29, 1948, to run from FM 703 (now SH 115) southwest 8.5 miles (13.7 km) to a road intersection west of SH 82 (now SH 18). On January 27, 1949, the road was lengthened 0.5 miles (0.80 km), and the west end was moved to a new intersection with SH 82 (now SH 18). On February 28, 1951, the road was extended west and south to SH 115 (later FM 1211, now SH 302), completing its current route.

== FM 875 ==
Farm to Market Road 875
- Location: Ellis County
- Length: 12.351 mi (19.877 km)
- Existed: 1948–present

Farm to Market Road 875 (FM 875) is located in Ellis County. It runs from Bus. US 287 northwest of Waxahachie west via Mountain Peak to FM 157.

FM 875 was designated on October 29, 1948, to run from US 287 (later Loop 528, now Bus. US 287) northwest 5.0 miles (8.0 km) towards Mountain Peak. On November 20, 1951, the road was extended northwest to FM 663. On October 25, 1955, the road was extended to FM 157, replacing a section of FM 663.

== FM 876 ==
Farm to Market Road 876
- Location: Ellis County
- Length: 9.744 mi (15.681 km)
- Existed: 1948–present

Farm to Market Road 876 (FM 876) is located in Ellis County. It runs 9.7 miles (15.6 km) from I-35E in Waxahachie southwestward through the unincorporated community of Five Points.

FM 876 was designated on October 29, 1948, running from FM 66 in Waxahachie southwestward 6.6 miles (10.6 km) to near Five Points. On June 30, 1958, the section of FM 876 from FM 66 to I-35E was cancelled. On July 11, 1968, FM 876 was extended southwest 2.9 miles (4.7 km). On November 25, 1975, FM 876 was extended southwest 0.7 miles (1.1 km) to its current terminus.

Junction list

The entire route is in Ellis County.

Location	mi	km	Destinations	Notes
	0.0	0.0	L. R. Campbell Road	Southern terminus; continues south as L. R. Campbell Road
	7.7	12.4	FM 1493 west – Boz	
Waxahachie	9.7	15.6	I-35E	I-35E exit 399 northbound; exit 399A southbound; northern terminus at southbound frontage road
1.000 mi = 1.609 km; 1.000 km = 0.621 mi

== FM 877 ==
Farm to Market Road 877
- Location: Ellis County
- Length: 12.638 mi (20.339 km)
- Existed: 1948–present

Farm to Market Road 877 (FM 877) is located in Ellis County. The highway travels from SH 34 northwestward to US 77 / FM 66 in Waxahachie. FM 877 runs along the eastern edge of Lake Waxahachie between Hunter Pass and Lakeshore Drive.

FM 877 was designated on October 29, 1948, running from US 77 to a point south of Howard at a distance of 9.5 miles (15.3 km). On March 26, 1953, the highway was extended 3.6 miles (5.8 km) southeastward to SH 34.

Junction list

The entire route is in Ellis County.

Location	mi	km	Destinations	Notes
	0.0	0.0	SH 34 – Avalon, Bardwell	
	4.3	6.9	FM 984 south – Bardwell	
Waxahachie	12.6	20.3	FM 1446 west (College Street)	
Waxahachie	12.7	20.4	US 77 / FM 66 west (Rogers Street)	
1.000 mi = 1.609 km; 1.000 km = 0.621 mi

== FM 878 ==
Farm to Market Road 878
- Location: Ellis County
- Length: 11.063 mi (17.804 km)
- Existed: 1948–present

Farm to Market Road 878 (FM 878) is located in Ellis County.

FM 878 begins at an intersection with US 77 in Waxahachie. The highway runs in a slight southeast direction along Marvin Avenue and intersects FM 813 just a few blocks east of US 77. FM 878 turns at a nearly 90 degree angle and Marvin Avenue becomes Hackberry Street. The highway turns onto Cleaver Road and meets FM 879 at its interchange with US 287. FM 878 exits the Waxahachie city limits and runs through rural areas of Ellis County before ending at an intersection with FM 813 in western Palmer.

FM 878 was designated on October 29, 1948, to run from US 77 east 7.8 miles (12.6 km) to a road intersection. FM 878 was extended 3.6 miles (5.8 km) to FM 813 on November 23, 1948.

Junction list

The entire route is in Ellis County.

Location	mi	km	Destinations	Notes
Waxahachie	0.0	0.0	US 77 (Ferris Avenue)	
Waxahachie	0.2	0.32	FM 813 east (Brown Street)	
Waxahachie	2.1– 2.3	3.4– 3.7	US 287 / FM 879 east – Fort Worth, Corsicana, Boyce	
Palmer	11.1	17.9	FM 813 (Jefferson Street) – Rockett, Palmer	
1.000 mi = 1.609 km; 1.000 km = 0.621 mi

== FM 879 ==
Farm to Market Road 879
- Location: Ellis County
- Length: 15.978 mi (25.714 km)
- Existed: 1948–present

Farm to Market Road 879 (FM 879) is located in Ellis County. The highway runs from FM 878 at US 287 in Waxahachie eastward and northward to FM 813.

FM 879 was designated on October 29, 1948, traveling from the Waxahachie/Palmer Road (now FM 878) to point east of Boyce at a distance of 6.3 miles (10.1 km). On June 8, 1949, the highway was extended 5.0 miles (8.0 km) eastward to US 75 (now Spur 469) north of Ennis. FM 879 was extended 5.7 miles (9.2 km) northeastward to FM 813 on June 28, 1963.

Junction list

The entire route is in Ellis County.

Location	mi	km	Destinations	Notes
Waxahachie	0.0	0.0	FM 878 to US 287 – Palmer, Waxahachie	
	7.5	12.1	FM 1722 south – Ennis	
	10.9– 11.1	17.5– 17.9	I-45 / Spur 469 south – Dallas, Corsicana, Ennis	I-45 exit 255
	16.2	26.1	FM 813 – Palmer, Bristol	
1.000 mi = 1.609 km; 1.000 km = 0.621 mi

== FM 880 ==
Farm to Market Road 880
- Location: Shackelford and Callahan counties
- Length: 33.482 mi (53.884 km)
- Existed: 1948–present

Farm to Market Road 880 (FM 880) is a two-lane highway that connects the farming areas of Cross Plains, Putnam and Moran with Interstate 20 (I‑20), SH 206, and SH 6. The highway continues from Cross Plains northward through eastern Callahan County and continues to Putnam and connects to SH 6 via a short spur route. The road continues into Shackelford County and ends in Moran.

FM 880 was originally designated from SH 36 north 7.5 miles (12.1 km) to Cottonwood. On September 5, 1951, FM 880 was rerouted over FM 1079 from FM 880's current junction with FM 1079 to US 80 (now I‑20). The old route of FM 880 from FM 1079 west to Cottonwood was renumbered as FM 1079, swapping the alignments of the routes. On January 28, 1953, FM 880 was extended north to US 380 (now SH 6), replacing FM 1832 on that route. On July 15, 1957, FM 880 was extended north over part of Loop 318 to FM 576, and the rest of Loop 318 became a spur of FM 880. On March 22, 1960, the section of FM 880 from SH 36 north 0.75 miles (1.21 km) was transferred to SH 206.

Junction list

County	Location	mi	km	Destinations	Notes
Callahan	Cross Plains	0.0	0.0	SH 206	Southern terminus
Callahan		6.9	11.1	FM 1079	
Callahan		9.0	14.5	FM 2228	
Callahan	Putnam	19.8	31.9	I-20 west	Southern end of I-20 concurrency; I-20 exit 319
Callahan		20.6	33.2	I-20 east / FM 2945 south	Northern end of I-20 concurrency; southern end of FM 2945 concurrency; I-20 exit 320
Callahan		20.9	33.6	I-20	I-20 exit 320
Callahan		21.2	34.1	FM 2945 north	Northern end of FM 2945 concurrency
Callahan		31.4	50.5	FM Spur 880 east to SH 6	Western terminus of Spur 880
Shackelford	Moran	34.9	56.2	FM 576	Northern terminus
1.000 mi = 1.609 km; 1.000 km = 0.621 mi: Concurrency terminus

== FM 881 ==
Farm to Market Road 881
- Location: Marion County
- Length: 0.518 mi (834 m)
- Existed: December 21, 1994–present

Farm to Market Road 881 (FM 881) is located in Marion County.

FM 881 was designated on December 21, 1994, on its current route from SH 49 north to the International Paper Plant west of Jefferson.

=== FM 881 (1948) ===
Farm to Market Road 881
- Location: Aransas County
- Existed: November 23, 1948–June 29, 1993

A previous route numbered FM 881 was designated on November 23, 1948, from FM 136, 0.5 miles (0.80 km) south of the Aransas County line, east to SH 35 (now Bus. SH 35) in Rockport. On October 26, 1954, the road was extended west 16.2 miles (26.1 km) to US 181 east of Sinton. On March 24, 1958, the road was extended west 15.5 miles (24.9 km) to SH 9 (now I-37) southeast of Mathis, replacing a section of FM 630 and all of FM 894 and creating a concurrency with US 181. On May 7, 1970, the road was extended east 0.3 miles (0.48 km) to Loop 70. On December 22, 1992, a 38.8-mile (62.4 km) section of FM 881 from I-37 to FM 1069 was transferred to the newly-created SH 188, leaving only the section from SH 188 southwest of Rockport northeast to Bus. SH 35. On June 29, 1993, this section was cancelled and transferred to FM 1069 when it was rerouted.

== FM 882 ==
Farm to Market Road 882
- Location: Bee, Live Oak, and Karnes counties
- Length: 14.113 mi (22.713 km)
- Existed: 1948–present

Farm to Market Road 882 (FM 882) is located in Bee, Live Oak, and Karnes counties. It runs from SH 72 west, north, and east to FM 626.

FM 882 was designated on November 23, 1948, to run from SH 72 west, north and east to Nell. On October 26, 1954, the road was extended east to the Live Oak/Karnes County Line. On October 31, 1958, the road was extended east to FM 626, its current terminus.

== FM 883 ==
Farm to Market Road 883
- Location: Goliad and Bee counties
- Length: 15.878 mi (25.553 km)
- Existed: 1948–present

Farm to Market Road 883 (FM 883) is located in Goliad and Bee counties. It runs from US 59 to FM 623.

FM 883 was designated on November 23, 1948, to run from US 59 in Berclair northwest 7.0 miles (11.3 km) to a road intersection near the former Wilson School. On November 24, 1959, the road was extended northwest 3.1 miles (5.0 km). On September 20, 1961, the road was extended northwest to FM 623, its current terminus.

== FM 884 ==
Farm to Market Road 884
- Location: Goliad and DeWitt counties
- Length: 25.869 mi (41.632 km)
- Existed: 1948–present

Farm to Market Road 884 (FM 884) is located in Goliad and DeWitt counties. It runs from FM 81 northeast, east, north, and west to SH 119.

FM 884 was designated on November 23, 1948, to run from SH 119 in Weesatche northeast to Dobskyville. On July 14, 1949, the road extended southwest 6.6 miles (10.6 km) to a road intersection near the former Melrose School. On December 17, 1952, the road was extended southwest to FM 81. On May 6, 1957 (connecting section designated April 23), the road was extended northwest to SH 119 near Yorktown, replacing FM 2435.

== FM 885 ==
Farm to Market Road 885
- Location: Karnes County
- Length: 3.358 mi (5.404 km)
- Existed: 1948–present

Farm to Market Road 885 (FM 885) is located in Karnes County. It runs from FM 81 in Runge to the south end of the Ojo de Aqua Creek Bridge.

FM 885 was designated on November 23, 1948, on the current route.

== FM 886 ==
Farm to Market Road 886
- Location: Hidalgo County
- Length: 1.871 mi (3.011 km)
- Existed: May 23, 1951–present

Farm to Market Road 886 (FM 886) is located in Hidalgo County. It runs from US 83 to Los Ebanos.

FM 886 was designated on May 23, 1951, on the current route.

=== FM 886 (1948) ===
Farm to Market Road 886
- Location: Karnes County
- Existed: November 23, 1948–January 6, 1950

A previous route numbered FM 886 was designated on November 23, 1948, from an intersection with SH 123 via Panna Maria to the west end of the Cibolo Creek bridge as a replacement of Spur 129. On July 14, 1949, the road was extended 3.5 miles (5.6 km) to an intersection with SH 80 at Helena. FM 886 was cancelled on January 6, 1950, and became a portion of FM 81.

== FM 887 ==
Farm to Market Road 887
- Location: Karnes County
- Length: 21.447 mi (34.516 km)
- Existed: 1948–present

Farm to Market Road 887 (FM 887) is located in Karnes County. It runs from FM 791 to Spur 190 in Gillett. There is a concurrency with US 181.

FM 887 was designated on November 23, 1948, to run from US 181 northeast to SH 123. On December 17, 1952, the road was extended to SH 80. On October 28, 1954, the road was cut back to Spur 190 in Gillett to eliminate the concurrency with it. On May 7, 1974, the road was extended to FM 791, its current terminus.

== FM 888 ==
Farm to Market Road 888
- Location: Live Oak and Bee counties
- Length: 24.827 mi (39.955 km)
- Existed: 1948–present

Farm to Market Road 888 (FM 888) is located in Live Oak and Bee counties. It runs from a road intersection near Lake Corpus Christi to BU 181-J in Beeville.

FM 888 was designated on November 23, 1948, to run from SH 9 (now FM 3024) northeast to a road intersection at the Bee County Line. On November 17, 1949, the road was extended to US 181 (now BU 181-J), replacing FM 1350. On May 23, 1951, the road was extended southwest 3.0 miles (4.8 km) to a road intersection. On October 26, 1956, a spur connection in Argenta was added, replacing Spur 228. On May 19, 1970, the spur connection was transferred to FM 3190.

== FM 889 ==
Farm to Market Road 889
- Location: Live Oak County
- Length: 11.59 mi (18.65 km)
- Existed: 1948–present

Farm to Market Road 889 (FM 889) is located in Live Oak County. It runs from US 281 north of George West southwest to a road intersection.

FM 889 was designated on November 23, 1948, to run from US 281 southwest 9.1 miles (14.6 km) to a road intersection. On October 31, 1958, the road was extended 2.5 miles (4.0 km) to another road intersection, its current terminus.

== FM 890 ==
Farm to Market Road 890
- Location: Wichita County
- Length: 2.709 mi (4.360 km)
- Existed: November 24, 1959–present

Farm to Market Road 890 (FM 890) is located in Wichita County, traveling mostly in Wichita Falls.

FM 890 begins at I-44/US 277/US 281 in northern Wichita Falls. The highway travels along Airport Drive in a mostly eastern direction and has a junction with Spur 325. FM 890 continues to run in an eastern direction through rural areas of the city and turns northeast at SH 240. The highway turns back east at McKinley Road, passes south of the Wichita Falls Municipal Airport, and exits the city before ending at an intersection with FM 171.

The current FM 890 was designated on November 24, 1959, running from Spur 325 eastward to Loop 165 (now SH 240) at a distance of 0.7 miles (1.1 km). The highway was extended 1.5 miles (2.4 km) eastward from Loop 165 to FM 171 on June 20, 1961. FM 890 was extended 0.5 miles (0.80 km) westward from Spur 325 to US 277/US 281 (now part of I-44) on May 6, 1964. The entire highway was internally redesignated as Urban Road 890 (UR 890) by TxDOT on June 27, 1995. The designation reverted to FM 890 with the elimination of the Urban Road system on November 15, 2018.

Junction list

The entire route is in Wichita County.

Location	mi	km	Destinations	Notes
Wichita Falls	0.0	0.0	I-44 / US 277 / US 281 (Central Freeway) – Burkburnett	I-44 exit 3C; continues westward as Loop 11
Wichita Falls	0.5	0.80	Spur 325 – Wichita Falls, Sheppard AFB	Interchange
Wichita Falls	1.2	1.9	SH 240 (Burkburnett Road) – Sheppard AFB	
	2.7	4.3	FM 171 – Thornberry, Wichita Falls	
1.000 mi = 1.609 km; 1.000 km = 0.621 mi

=== FM 890 (1948) ===
Farm to Market Road 890
- Location: Live Oak County
- Existed: November 23, 1948–July 14, 1949

The first route numbered FM 890 was designated on November 23, 1948, running from SH 72 7 miles (11 km) northeast of Three Rivers, southward to Ray Point at a distance of 1.4 miles (2.3 km). The highway was cancelled and removed from the state highway system on July 14, 1949.

=== FM 890 (1951) ===
Farm to Market Road 890
- Location: Hidalgo County
- Existed: May 23, 1951–January 8, 1957

The second route numbered FM 890 was designated on May 23, 1951, traveling from FM 490 at Hargill to SH 107 at La Blanco at a distance of 10.5 miles (16.9 km). The highway was extended south to US 83 on December 14, 1956. The highway was cancelled on January 8, 1957, with the mileage being transferred to FM 493.

== FM 891 ==
Farm to Market Road 891
- Location: Nueces County
- Existed: November 23, 1948–April 24, 1958

Farm to Market Road 891 (FM 891) was located in Nueces County.

FM 891 was designated on November 23, 1948, from SH 286/SH 358 south of Corpus Christi to SH 9 (now I-37), 1.5 miles (2.4 km) west of Corpus Christi. FM 891 was cancelled on April 24, 1958, and transferred to SH 358.

== FM 892 ==
Farm to Market Road 892
- Location: Nueces County
- Length: 14.017 mi (22.558 km)
- Existed: 1948–present

Farm to Market Road 892 (FM 892) is located in Nueces County. It runs from US 77/BU 77-U in Robstown to FM 70.

FM 892 was designated on November 23, 1948, to run from US 77 (now BU 77-U & Industrial Boulevard) south to FM 665. On April 24, 1953, the road was extended south to FM 70. The north end was cut back to US 77/BU 77-U when the US 77 Robstown bypass (now also I-69) was opened around August 2001.

== FM 893 ==
Farm to Market Road 893
- Location: San Patricio County
- Length: 11.336 mi (18.244 km)
- Existed: 1948–present

Farm to Market Road 893 (FM 893) is located in San Patricio County. It runs from US 181 west to the historic site of the West Portland School, then to FM 631.

FM 893 was designated on November 23, 1948, on the current route.

== FM 894 ==
Farm to Market Road 894
- Location: San Patricio County
- Existed: November 23, 1948–March 24, 1958

Farm to Market Road 894 (FM 894) was located in San Patricio County.

FM 894 was designated on November 23, 1948, from FM 630, 5.5 miles (8.9 km) west of Sinton, west to SH 9 (now I-37) southeast of Mathis. FM 894 was cancelled on March 24, 1958, and transferred to FM 881 (now SH 188).

== FM 895 ==
Farm to Market Road 895
- Location: Delta County
- Length: 12.634 mi (20.332 km)
- Existed: 1948–present

Farm to Market Road 895 (FM 895) is located in Delta County. It runs from SH 19 east to Kensing.

FM 895 was designated on November 23, 1948, to run from SH 154 (now SH 19) east to Charleston. On September 28, 1949, the road was extended east to Kensing, its current terminus.

== FM 896 ==
Farm to Market Road 896
- Location: Fannin County
- Length: 7.469 mi (12.020 km)
- Existed: 1948–present

Farm to Market Road 896 (FM 896) is located in Fannin County. It runs from SH 78 to Bus. SH 121.

FM 896 was designated on November 23, 1948, to run from US 69 near Leonard to SH 121 (Later Loop 451, now Bus. SH 121). On October 31, 2002, the road was extended to SH 78, replacing Loop 221.

== FM 897 ==
Farm to Market Road 897
- Location: Fannin County
- Length: 3.156 mi (5.079 km)
- Existed: 1948–present

Farm to Market Road 897 (FM 897) is located in Fannin County. It runs from SH 56 in Dodd City to FM 1396.

FM 897 was designated on November 23, 1948, to run from US 82 (now SH 56) in Dodd City north to Lannius. On December 10, 2020, the road was rerouted north of US 82 and extended to FM 1396.

== FM 898 ==
Farm to Market Road 898
- Location: Grayson and Fannin Counties
- Length: 20.861 mi (33.573 km)
- Existed: 1948–present

Farm to Market Road 898 (FM 898) is located in Grayson and Fannin counties. It runs from US 69 to SH 121.

FM 898 was designated on November 23, 1948, to run from US 82 (now SH 56) at Ector south and west to Ely. On August 22, 1951 (connecting section designated July 25), the road was extended to US 69, replacing FM 1283. On October 31, 1957, the road was extended northeast to SH 78. On May 5, 1966, the road was extended to FM 273 & FM 1396. On February 27, 2003, the section from SH 121 to SH 78 was cancelled as part was closed off due to an airport runway extension, creating a gap. On January 29, 2004, the section from SH 78 to FM 273 & FM 1396 became part of FM 273 (which was rerouted so that the old route became an extension of FM 1396), eliminating the gap.

== FM 899 ==
Farm to Market Road 899
- Location: Titus County
- Length: 3.86 mi (6.21 km)
- Existed: 1948–present

Farm to Market Road 899 (FM 899) is located in Titus County. It runs from I-30 to BU 271-E.

FM 899 was designated on November 23, 1948, to run from US 67 in Mt. Vernon south and east 5.0 miles (8.0 km) along the old route of US 67 to a road intersection. On July 21, 1949, the road was extended 2.4 miles (3.9 km) to the Franklin/Titus County Line. On November 20, 1951, the road was extended to Spur 134. On June 2, 1964, the road was extended east to US 271 (later Loop 419, now Bus. US 271). On November 22, 1965, an 11.0 miles (17.7 km) section was transferred to I-30, and the section north of I-30 was redesignated as Texas State Highway Spur 423.
