= Santa Rosa High School =

Santa Rosa High School may refer to:

- Santa Rosa High School (Santa Rosa, California)
- Santa Rosa High School (Santa Rosa, New Mexico), a high school of Santa Rosa Consolidated Schools in Santa Rosa, New Mexico
- Santa Rosa High School (Texas), a high school in the Santa Rosa Independent School District in Santa Rosa, Texas
