= Arroyo Gardens, Texas =

- Census-designated place
- Location within the state of Texas
- Coordinates: 26°13′32″N 97°29′38″W
- Country: United States
- State: Texas
- County: Cameron

Area
  - Total: 4.0 sq mi (10.3 km^{2})
  - Land: 3.9 sq mi (10.2 km^{2})
  - Water: 0.039 sq mi (0.1 km^{2})
- Elevation: 19 ft (5.8 m)

Population (2020)
  - Total: 420
  - Density: 110/sq mi (41/km^{2})
- Time zone: UTC-6 (Central (CST))
  - Summer (DST): UTC-5 (CDT)
- FIPS code: 48-04176

Arroyo Gardens is a census-designated place (CDP) in Cameron County, in the U.S. state of Texas. As of the 2020 census, Arroyo Gardens had a population of 420. Prior to the 2010 census, the community was part of the Arroyo Gardens-La Tina Ranch CDP. It is part of the Brownsville–Harlingen Metropolitan Statistical Area.

== Geography ==
Arroyo Gardens is in north-central Cameron County, 14 miles (23 km) east of Harlingen and 24 miles (39 km) north of Brownsville. It is bordered on the east by La Tina Ranch.

According to the United States Census Bureau, the CDP has a total area of 4.0 square miles (10.3 km^{2}), of which 3.9 square miles (10.2 km^{2}) is land and 0.04 square miles (0.1 km^{2}), or 1.03%, is water.

== Demographics ==
Historical population
Census	Pop.	Note	%±
2010	456		—
2020	420		−7.9%
U.S. Decennial Census; 1850–1900 1910; 1920 1930 1940; 1950 1960 1970; 1980 1990 2000; 2010

Arroyo Gardens first appeared as a census designated place in the 2010 U.S. census after the Arroyo Gardens-La Tina Ranch CDP was split into the Arroyo Gardens and La Tina Ranch CDPs.

=== 2020 census ===
Arroyo Gardens CDP, Texas – Racial and ethnic composition Note: the US Census treats Hispanic/Latino as an ethnic category. This table excludes Latinos from the racial categories and assigns them to a separate category. Hispanics/Latinos may be of any race.
Race / Ethnicity (NH = Non-Hispanic)	Pop 2010	Pop 2020	% 2010	% 2020
White alone (NH)	27	44	5.92%	10.48%
Black or African American alone (NH)	0	1	0.00%	0.24%
Native American or Alaska Native alone (NH)	0	0	0.00%	0.00%
Asian alone (NH)	0	0	0.00%	0.00%
Native Hawaiian or Pacific Islander alone (NH)	0	0	0.00%	0.00%
Other race alone (NH)	0	1	0.00%	0.24%
Mixed race or Multiracial (NH)	0	1	0.00%	0.24%
Hispanic or Latino (any race)	429	373	94.08%	88.81%
Total	456	420	100.00%	100.00%
