= La Tina Ranch, Texas =

- Census-designated place
- Location within the state of Texas
- Coordinates: 26°13′7″N 97°28′28″W
- Country: United States
- State: Texas
- County: Cameron

Area
  - Total: 7.1 sq mi (18.3 km^{2})
  - Land: 7.0 sq mi (18.2 km^{2})
  - Water: 0.039 sq mi (0.1 km^{2})
- Elevation: 23 ft (7.0 m)

Population (2020)
  - Total: 687
  - Density: 88/sq mi (33.9/km^{2})
- Time zone: UTC-6 (Central (CST))
  - Summer (DST): UTC-5 (CDT)
- FIPS code: 48-41660.

La Tina Ranch is a census-designated place (CDP) in Cameron County, in the U.S. state of Texas. As of the 2020 census, La Tina Ranch had a population of 687. Prior to the 2010 census, the community was part of the Arroyo Gardens-La Tina Ranch CDP. It is part of the Brownsville–Harlingen Metropolitan Statistical Area.

The first population estimates were available in 1976, when the community had 61 dwellings and 319 residents. At that time, the area had no public water supply.

== Geography ==
La Tina Ranch is in north-central Cameron County, 16 miles (26 km) east of Harlingen and 25 miles (40 km) north of Brownsville. It is bordered on the west by Arroyo Gardens.

According to the United States Census Bureau, the CDP has a total area of 7.1 square miles (18.3 km^{2}), of which 7.0 square miles (18.2 km^{2}) is land and 0.04 square miles (0.1 km^{2}), or 0.69%, is water.

== Demographics ==
Historical population
Census	Pop.	Note	%±
2010	618		—
2020	687		11.2%
U.S. Decennial Census; 1850–1900 1910; 1920 1930 1940; 1950 1960 1970; 1980 1990 2000; 2010 2020

La Tina Ranch first appeared as a census designated place in the 2010 U.S. census after the Arroyo Gardens-La Tina Ranch CDP was split into the La Tina Ranch and Arroyo Gardens CDPs.

=== 2020 census ===
La Tina Ranch CDP, Texas – Racial and ethnic composition Note: the US Census treats Hispanic/Latino as an ethnic category. This table excludes Latinos from the racial categories and assigns them to a separate category. Hispanics/Latinos may be of any race.
Race / Ethnicity (NH = Non-Hispanic)	Pop 2010	Pop 2020	% 2010	% 2020
White alone (NH)	28	27	4.53%	3.93%
Black or African American alone (NH)	1	2	0.16%	0.29%
Native American or Alaska Native alone (NH)	0	0	0.00%	0.00%
Asian alone (NH)	1	0	0.16%	0.00%
Native Hawaiian or Pacific Islander alone (NH)	0	0	0.00%	0.00%
Other race alone (NH)	0	0	0.00%	0.00%
Mixed race or Multiracial (NH)	0	2	0.00%	0.29%
Hispanic or Latino (any race)	588	656	95.15%	95.49%
Total	618	687	100.00%	100.00%
