= Boz, Texas =

Ghost town in Texas, US

Boz
- Ghost town
- Location in Texas
- Coordinates: 32°18′30″N 96°55′45″W
- Country: United States
- State: Texas
- County: Ellis
- Elevation: 617 ft (188 m)
- GNIS feature ID: 1378041

Boz is a ghost town in Ellis County, Texas, United States.

== History ==
Boz is situated on Farm to Market Road 1493, and was settled in the late 1880s. A post office operated from 1891 to 1906. The church was the location for several scenes of the 1984 film Places in the Heart. By 1992, all but one resident left the town due to the planned construction of the Superconducting Super Collider.
