= Rangerville, Texas =

- Village
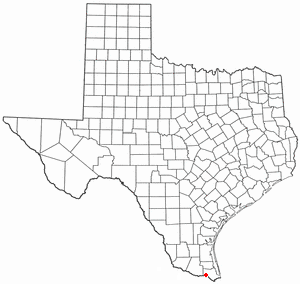
- Location of Rangerville, Texas

- Coordinates: 26°6′11″N 97°44′20″W
- Country: United States
- State: Texas
- County: Cameron

Area
  - Total: 3.5 sq mi (9.1 km^{2})
  - Land: 3.5 sq mi (9.0 km^{2})
  - Water: 0.039 sq mi (0.1 km^{2})
- Elevation: 52 ft (16 m)

Population (2020)
  - Total: 255
  - Density: 73/sq mi (28/km^{2})
- Time zone: UTC-6 (Central (CST))
  - Summer (DST): UTC-5 (CDT)
- ZIP code: 78586
- Area code: 956
- FIPS code: 48-60644
- GNIS feature ID: 1375631

Rangerville is a village in Cameron County, Texas, United States. It was incorporated in 1958. The population was 255 at the 2020 census, up from 289 at the 2010 census.

Rangerville is part of the Brownsville–Harlingen–Raymondville and the Matamoros–Brownsville metropolitan areas.

== Geography ==
Rangerville is located in southwestern Cameron County at 26°6′11″N 97°44′20″W (26.103104, -97.738982). It is 7 miles (11 km) southwest of the center of Harlingen and 4 miles (6 km) north of the Rio Grande.

According to the United States Census Bureau, the village had a total area of 3.5 square miles (9.1 km^{2}), of which 3.5 square miles (9.0 km^{2}) are land and 0.04 square miles (0.1 km^{2}), or 1.50%, is covered by water.

The village is governed by a mayor and two city commissioners; it has no taxes and provides no services.

== Demographics ==
Historical population
| Census | Pop. | Note | %± |
|---|---|---|---|
| 2020 | 255 | | — |
U.S. Decennial Census; 1850–1900 1910; 1920 1930 1940; 1950 1960 1970; 1980 1990 2000; 2010

=== 2020 census ===
Rangerville racial composition (NH = Non-Hispanic) (Note: Note: the US Census treats Hispanic/Latino as an ethnic category. This table excludes Latinos from the racial categories and assigns them to a separate category. Hispanics/Latinos can be of any race.)
| Race | Number | Percentage |
|---|---|---|
| White (NH) | 24 | 9.41% |
| Black or African American (NH) | 1 | 0.39% |
| Asian (NH) | 1 | 0.39% |
| Some Other Race (NH) | 1 | 0.39% |
| Mixed/Multi-Racial (NH) | 3 | 1.18% |
| Hispanic or Latino | 225 | 88.24% |
| Total | 255 | |

As of the 2020 United States census, there were 255 people, 62 households, and 17 families residing in the village.

=== 2000 census ===
As of the census of 2000, 203 people, 57 households, and 47 families were residing in the village. The population density was 57.6 inhabitants per square mile (22.2/km^{2}). The 66 housing units averaged 18.7/sq mi (7.2/km^{2}). The racial makeup of the village was 65.02% White, 3.45% African American, 29.56% from other races, and 1.97% from two or more races. Hispanics or Latinos of any race were 77.34% of the population.

Of the 57 households, 38.6% had children under the age of 18 living with them, 70.2% were married couples living together, 8.8% had a female householder with no husband present, and 15.8% were not families. About 12.3% of all households were made up of individuals, and 3.5% had someone living alone who was 65 years of age or older. The average household size was 3.56, and the average family size was 4.00.

In the village, the age distribution was 30.5% under 18, 10.3% from 18 to 24, 25.6% from 25 to 44, 25.6% from 45 to 64, and 7.9% who were 65 or older. The median age was 33 years. For every 100 females, there were 101.0 males. For every 100 females age 18 and over, there were 95.8 males.

The median income for a household in the village was $30,357, and for a family was $30,357. Males had a median income of $25,781 versus $22,500 for females. The per capita income for the village was $18,185. About 28.6% of families and 32.6% of the population were below the poverty line, including 44.3% of those under the age of 18 and 54.5% of those 65 or over.

== Education ==
Rangerville is located in the San Benito Consolidated Independent School District.

In addition, South Texas Independent School District operates magnet schools that serve the community.
