= Santa Rosa High School (Texas) =

Location
- 102 North Main Street; Santa Rosa, Texas 78593; United States; 26.253368°N 97.823245°W

Information
- Type: Public high school
- School district: Santa Rosa Independent School District
- Principal: Rebecca Corpus
- Teaching staff: 32.71 (FTE)
- Grades: 9-12
- Enrollment: 307 (2023-2024)
- Student to teacher ratio: 9.39
- Colors: Black & gold
- Athletics conference: UIL Class 3A
- Team name: Warriors
- Website: Official website

Santa Rosa High School (SRHS) is a public high school located in Santa Rosa, Texas, United States. It is the sole high school in the Santa Rosa Independent School District and is classified as a 3A school by the UIL. For the 2024-2025 school year, the school was given a "C" by the Texas Education Agency.

== Athletics ==
The Santa Rosa Warriors compete in the following sports:

- Baseball
- Basketball
- Cross country
- Football
- Golf
- Powerlifting
- Softball
- Tennis
- Track and field
- Volleyball
