= Green Valley Farms, Texas =

- Census-designated place
- Coordinates: 26°7′10″N 97°33′53″W
- Country: United States
- State: Texas
- County: Cameron

Area
  - Total: 4.0 sq mi (10.3 km^{2})
  - Land: 3.9 sq mi (10.0 km^{2})
  - Water: 0.12 sq mi (0.3 km^{2})
- Elevation: 20 ft (6 m)

Population (2020)
  - Total: 655
  - Density: 170/sq mi (65.5/km^{2})
- Time zone: UTC-6 (Central (CST))
  - Summer (DST): UTC-5 (CDT)
- FIPS code: 48-30890
- GNIS feature ID: 1852710

Green Valley Farms is a census-designated place (CDP) in Cameron County, Texas, United States. The population was 655 at the 2020 census, down from 1,272 at the 2010 census. It is part of the Brownsville–Harlingen Metropolitan Statistical Area.

== Geography ==
Green Valley Farms is located near the center of Cameron County at 26°7′10″N 97°33′53″W (26.119582, -97.564861). It is 7 miles (11 km) east of San Benito and 18 miles (29 km) north of the center of Brownsville.

According to the United States Census Bureau, the CDP has a total area of 4.0 square miles (10.3 km^{2}), of which 3.9 square miles (10.0 km^{2}) is land and 0.1 square miles (0.3 km^{2}), or 2.65%, is water.

== Demographics ==
Historical population
| Census | Pop. | Note | %± |
|---|---|---|---|
| 2000 | 720 | | — |
| 2010 | 1,272 | | 76.7% |
| 2020 | 655 | | −48.5% |
U.S. Decennial Census; 1850–1900 1910; 1920 1930 1940; 1950 1960 1970; 1980 1990 2000; 2010 2020

Green Valley Farms first appeared as a census designated place in the 2000 U.S. census.

=== 2020 census ===
Green Valley Farms CDP, Texas – Racial and ethnic composition Note: the US Census treats Hispanic/Latino as an ethnic category. This table excludes Latinos from the racial categories and assigns them to a separate category. Hispanics/Latinos may be of any race.
| Race / Ethnicity (NH = Non-Hispanic) | Pop 2000 | Pop 2010 | Pop 2020 | % 2000 | % 2010 | % 2020 |
|---|---|---|---|---|---|---|
| White alone (NH) | 22 | 38 | 20 | 3.06% | 2.99% | 3.05% |
| Black or African American alone (NH) | 0 | 0 | 0 | 0.00% | 0.00% | 0.00% |
| Native American or Alaska Native alone (NH) | 0 | 1 | 0 | 0.00% | 0.08% | 0.00% |
| Asian alone (NH) | 0 | 1 | 0 | 0.00% | 0.08% | 0.00% |
| Native Hawaiian or Pacific Islander alone (NH) | 0 | 0 | 0 | 0.00% | 0.00% | 0.00% |
| Other race alone (NH) | 0 | 0 | 1 | 0.00% | 0.00% | 0.15% |
| Mixed race or Multiracial (NH) | 1 | 0 | 3 | 0.14% | 0.00% | 0.46% |
| Hispanic or Latino (any race) | 697 | 1,232 | 631 | 96.81% | 86.86% | 96.34% |
| Total | 720 | 1,272 | 655 | 100.00% | 100.00% | 100.00% |

At the 2000 census, there were 720 people, 160 households and 148 families residing in the CDP. The population density was 182.3 inhabitants per square mile (70.4/km^{2}). There were 191 housing units at an average density of 48.4 per square mile (18.7/km^{2}). The racial makeup of the CDP was 67.78% White, 0.42% African American, 0.69% Native American, 25.83% from other races, and 5.28% from two or more races. Hispanic or Latino of any race were 96.81% of the population.

There were 160 households, of which 60.0% had children under the age of 18 living with them, 71.3% were married couples living together, 17.5% had a female householder with no husband present, and 7.5% were non-families. 5.0% of all households were made up of individuals, and 1.3% had someone living alone who was 65 years of age or older. The average household size was 4.50 and the average family size was 4.68.

Age distribution was 42.6% under the age of 18, 14.0% from 18 to 24, 24.9% from 25 to 44, 14.7% from 45 to 64, and 3.8% who were 65 years of age or older. The median age was 21 years. For every 100 females, there were 105.7 males. For every 100 females age 18 and over, there were 102.5 males.

The median household income was $18,393, and the median family income was $17,000. Males had a median income of $13,875 versus $22,000 for females. The per capita income for the CDP was $5,612. About 48.8% of families and 56.2% of the population were below the poverty line, including 72.0% of those under age 18 and 100.0% of those age 65 or over.

== Education ==
Green Valley Farms is served by the Los Fresnos Consolidated Independent School District. In addition, South Texas Independent School District operates magnet schools that serve the community.
