= Santa Rosa, Texas =

- Town
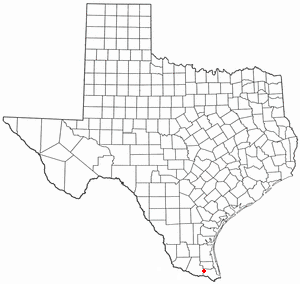
- Location of Santa Rosa, Texas

- Coordinates: 26°15′24″N 97°49′36″W
- Country: United States
- State: Texas
- County: Cameron

Area
  - Total: 0.77 sq mi (2.00 km^{2})
  - Land: 0.77 sq mi (2.00 km^{2})
  - Water: 0 sq mi (0.00 km^{2})
- Elevation: 49 ft (15 m)

Population (2020)
  - Total: 2,450
  - Density: 3,170/sq mi (1,230/km^{2})
- Time zone: UTC-6 (Central (CST))
  - Summer (DST): UTC-5 (CDT)
- ZIP code: 78593
- Area code: 956
- FIPS code: 48-65768
- GNIS feature ID: 1346669

Santa Rosa is a town in Cameron County, Texas, United States. The population was 2,450 at the 2020 census. It is part of the Brownsville–Harlingen–Raymondville and the Matamoros–Brownsville metropolitan areas.

== Geography ==
Santa Rosa is located in northwestern Cameron County at 26°15′24″N 97°49′36″W (26.256651, –97.826673). It is 6 miles (10 km) west of Combes and 7 miles (11 km) east of La Villa.

According to the United States Census Bureau, the town has a total area of 0.77 square miles (2.0 km^{2}), all land.

=== Climate ===
According to the Köppen Climate Classification system, Santa Rosa has a humid subtropical climate, abbreviated "Cfa" on climate maps. The hottest temperature recorded in Santa Rosa was 107 °F (41.7 °C) on September 6, 2000, and June 24, 2017, while the coldest temperature recorded was 16 °F (−8.9 °C) on December 23, 1989.

Climate data for Santa Rosa, Texas, 1991–2020 normals, extremes 1987–present
Month	Jan	Feb	Mar	Apr	May	Jun	Jul	Aug	Sep	Oct	Nov	Dec	Year
Record high °F (°C)	93 (34)	98 (37)	102 (39)	106 (41)	105 (41)	107 (42)	105 (41)	105 (41)	107 (42)	103 (39)	99 (37)	92 (33)	107 (42)
Mean maximum °F (°C)	86.3 (30.2)	90.3 (32.4)	94.3 (34.6)	96.4 (35.8)	97.3 (36.3)	100.2 (37.9)	101.0 (38.3)	102.0 (38.9)	99.7 (37.6)	96.3 (35.7)	91.4 (33.0)	87.1 (30.6)	103.2 (39.6)
Mean daily maximum °F (°C)	71.3 (21.8)	75.7 (24.3)	80.9 (27.2)	86.4 (30.2)	90.6 (32.6)	94.9 (34.9)	96.3 (35.7)	97.4 (36.3)	92.6 (33.7)	88.0 (31.1)	79.7 (26.5)	72.9 (22.7)	85.6 (29.8)
Daily mean °F (°C)	60.4 (15.8)	64.4 (18.0)	69.7 (20.9)	75.3 (24.1)	80.7 (27.1)	84.8 (29.3)	86.0 (30.0)	86.4 (30.2)	82.3 (27.9)	76.6 (24.8)	68.4 (20.2)	61.6 (16.4)	74.7 (23.7)
Mean daily minimum °F (°C)	48.8 (9.3)	53.2 (11.8)	58.4 (14.7)	64.2 (17.9)	70.8 (21.6)	74.7 (23.7)	75.7 (24.3)	75.4 (24.1)	72.0 (22.2)	65.2 (18.4)	57.0 (13.9)	50.2 (10.1)	63.8 (17.7)
Mean minimum °F (°C)	34.5 (1.4)	37.4 (3.0)	42.1 (5.6)	48.8 (9.3)	58.6 (14.8)	69.1 (20.6)	71.5 (21.9)	71.3 (21.8)	63.1 (17.3)	49.2 (9.6)	40.6 (4.8)	34.6 (1.4)	31.8 (−0.1)
Record low °F (°C)	25 (−4)	22 (−6)	30 (−1)	38 (3)	50 (10)	63 (17)	67 (19)	66 (19)	54 (12)	32 (0)	32 (0)	16 (−9)	16 (−9)
Average precipitation inches (mm)	1.12 (28)	1.00 (25)	1.40 (36)	1.39 (35)	2.48 (63)	2.88 (73)	1.67 (42)	2.10 (53)	5.56 (141)	2.66 (68)	1.23 (31)	1.12 (28)	24.61 (623)
Average snowfall inches (cm)	0.0 (0.0)	0.0 (0.0)	0.0 (0.0)	0.0 (0.0)	0.0 (0.0)	0.0 (0.0)	0.0 (0.0)	0.0 (0.0)	0.0 (0.0)	0.0 (0.0)	0.0 (0.0)	0.1 (0.25)	0.1 (0.25)
Average precipitation days (≥ 0.01 in)	7.0	5.5	5.8	4.7	4.6	5.2	3.8	5.2	9.4	6.1	5.7	7.2	70.2
Average snowy days (≥ 0.1 in)	0.0	0.0	0.0	0.0	0.0	0.0	0.0	0.0	0.0	0.0	0.0	0.0	0.0
Source 1: NOAA
Source 2: National Weather Service

== Demographics ==
Historical population
Census	Pop.	Note	%±
1930	737		—
1940	224		−69.6%
1950	400		78.6%
1960	1,572		293.0%
1970	1,466		−6.7%
1980	1,889		28.9%
1990	2,223		17.7%
2000	2,833		27.4%
2010	2,873		1.4%
2020	2,450		−14.7%
U.S. Decennial Census

=== 2020 census ===
Santa Rosa racial composition (NH = Non-Hispanic) (Note: Note: the US Census treats Hispanic/Latino as an ethnic category. This table excludes Latinos from the racial categories and assigns them to a separate category. Hispanics/Latinos can be of any race.)
Race	Number	Percentage
White (NH)	66	2.69%
Black or African American (NH)	1	0.04%
Native American or Alaska Native (NH)	2	0.08%
Asian (NH)	4	0.16%
Pacific Islander (NH)	1	0.04%
Some Other Race (NH)	1	0.04%
Mixed/Multi-Racial (NH)	7	0.29%
Hispanic or Latino	2,368	96.65%
Total	2,450	

As of the 2020 United States census, there were 2,450 people, 842 households, and 659 families residing in the town.

=== 2000 census ===
As of the census of 2000, there were 2,833 people, 744 households, and 647 families residing in the town. The population density was 4,814.8 inhabitants per square mile (1,859.0/km^{2}). There were 816 housing units at an average density of 1,386.8 per square mile (535.4/km^{2}). The racial makeup of the town was 65.58% White, 0.56% African American, 0.95% Native American, 0.11% Asian, 29.97% from other races, and 2.82% from two or more races. Hispanic or Latino of any race were 95.66% of the population.

There were 744 households, out of which 54.6% had children under the age of 18 living with them, 62.0% were married couples living together, 20.6% had a female householder with no husband present, and 13.0% were non-families. 11.7% of all households were made up of individuals, and 6.2% had someone living alone who was 65 years of age or older. The average household size was 3.81 and the average family size was 4.17.

In the town, the population was spread out, with 38.5% under the age of 18, 11.0% from 18 to 24, 26.9% from 25 to 44, 15.2% from 45 to 64, and 8.3% who were 65 years of age or older. The median age was 25 years. For every 100 females, there were 89.5 males. For every 100 females age 18 and over, there were 84.3 males.

The median income for a household in the town was $21,154, and the median income for a family was $23,203. Males had a median income of $18,214 versus $13,882 for females. The per capita income for the town was $6,998. About 34.0% of families and 39.1% of the population were below the poverty line, including 50.3% of those under age 18 and 30.3% of those age 65 or over.

== Government and infrastructure ==
The United States Postal Service operates the Santa Rosa Post Office.

== Education ==
The Santa Rosa Independent School District operates Santa Rosa High School, Santa Rosa Middle School, and an elementary/preschool.

In addition, South Texas Independent School District operates magnet schools that serve the community.

== Notable people ==
- Jesse Turner, lead vocalist and accordionist for Grupo Siggno
- Ruben Vela, (1937-2011) An accordionist and conjunto band leader from Santa Rosa. He has a street named after him and the Ruben Vela Festival is held in Santa Rosa as well.
