= Arroyo Gardens-La Tina Ranch, Texas =

Former census-designated place in Texas, United States

- Former CDP

- Location within the state of Texas
- Coordinates: 26°12′58″N 97°29′47″W
- Country: United States
- State: Texas
- County: Cameron

Area
  - Total: 16.5 sq mi (42.7 km^{2})
  - Land: 16.3 sq mi (42.2 km^{2})
  - Water: 0.19 sq mi (0.5 km^{2})

Population (2000)
  - Total: 732
  - Density: 45/sq mi (17.4/km^{2})
- Time zone: UTC-6 (Central (CST))
  - Summer (DST): UTC-5 (CDT)
- FIPS code: 48-04177

Arroyo Gardens-La Tina Ranch was a census-designated place (CDP) in Cameron County, Texas, United States. The population was 732 at the 2000 census. The community is part of the Brownsville–Harlingen Metropolitan Statistical Area.

== Geography ==
The Arroyo Gardens-La Tina Ranch CDP was located at 26°12′58″N 97°29′47″W (26.216092, -97.496506).

According to the United States Census Bureau, the CDP had a total area of 16.5 square miles (43 km^{2}), of which 16.3 square miles (42 km^{2}) was land and 0.2 square miles (0.52 km^{2}), or 1.21%, was water.

== Demographics ==
Historical population
Census	Pop.	Note	%±
2000	732		—
U.S. Decennial Census; 1850–1900 1910; 1920 1930 1940; 1950 1960 1970; 1980 1990 2000; 2010

Arroyo Gardens-La Tina Ranch first appeared as a census designated place prior to the 2000 U.S. census. For the 2010 U.S. census it was split into the Arroyo Gardens and La Tina Ranch CDPs.

=== 2000 census ===
Arroyo Gardens-La Tina Ranch CDP, Texas – Racial and ethnic composition Note: the US Census treats Hispanic/Latino as an ethnic category. This table excludes Latinos from the racial categories and assigns them to a separate category. Hispanics/Latinos may be of any race.
Race / Ethnicity (NH = Non-Hispanic)	Pop 2000	% 2000
White alone (NH)	35	4.78%
Black or African American alone (NH)	0	0.00%
Native American or Alaska Native alone (NH)	0	0.00%
Asian alone (NH)	0	0.00%
Pacific Islander alone (NH)	0	0.00%
Other race alone (NH)	0	0.00%
Mixed race or Multiracial (NH)	0	0.00%
Hispanic or Latino (any race)	697	95.22%
Total	732	100.00%

As of the census of 2000, there were 732 people, 205 households, and 173 families residing in the CDP. The population density was 45.0 inhabitants per square mile (17.4/km^{2}). There were 253 housing units at an average density of 15.5/sq mi (6.0/km^{2}). The racial makeup of the CDP was 96.45% White, 0.41% Native American, 2.73% from other races, and 0.41% from two or more races. Hispanic or Latino of any race were 95.22% of the population.

There were 205 households, out of which 41.0% had children under the age of 18 living with them, 65.4% were married couples living together, 13.2% had a female householder with no husband present, and 15.6% were non-families. 14.1% of all households were made up of individuals, and 5.9% had someone living alone who was 65 years of age or older. The average household size was 3.57 and the average family size was 3.97.

In the CDP, the population was spread out, with 32.1% under the age of 18, 9.6% from 18 to 24, 25.5% from 25 to 44, 21.9% from 45 to 64, and 10.9% who were 65 years of age or older. The median age was 32 years. For every 100 females, there were 95.2 males. For every 100 females age 18 and over, there were 88.3 males.

The median income for a household in the CDP was $17,056, and the median income for a family was $18,819. Males had a median income of $13,487 versus $11,786 for females. The per capita income for the CDP was $6,890. About 27.2% of families and 38.5% of the population were below the poverty line, including 55.9% of those under age 18 and 13.4% of those age 65 or over.

== Education ==
The communities are served by the Los Fresnos Consolidated Independent School District.

In addition, South Texas Independent School District operates magnet schools that serve the community.
