= Laureles, Texas =

- CDP
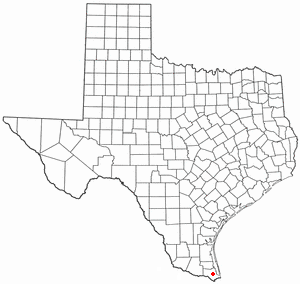
- Location of Laureles, Texas

- Coordinates: 26°6′48″N 97°29′22″W
- Country: United States
- State: Texas
- County: Cameron

Area
  - Total: 4.9 sq mi (12.6 km^{2})
  - Land: 4.9 sq mi (12.6 km^{2})
  - Water: 0 sq mi (0.0 km^{2})
- Elevation: 20 ft (6 m)

Population (2020)
  - Total: 4,111
  - Density: 845/sq mi (326/km^{2})
- Time zone: UTC-6 (Central (CST))
  - Summer (DST): UTC-5 (CDT)
- ZIP code: 78586
- Area code: 956
- FIPS code: 48-41728
- GNIS feature ID: 1374487

Laureles is a census-designated place (CDP) in Cameron County, Texas, United States. The population was 4,111 at the 2020 census. It is part of the Brownsville–Harlingen Metropolitan Statistical Area. Laureles is an area between Los Fresnos and San Benito.

== Geography ==
Laureles is located at 26°6′48″N 97°29′22″W (26.113362, -97.489552).

According to the United States Census Bureau, the CDP has a total area of 4.9 square miles (13 km^{2}), all land.

== Demographics ==
Historical population
Census	Pop.	Note	%±
2000	3,285		—
2010	3,692		12.4%
2020	4,111		11.3%
U.S. Decennial Census; 1850–1900 1910; 1920 1930 1940; 1950 1960 1970; 1980 1990 2000; 2010 2020

Laureles first appeared as a census designated place in the 2000 U.S. census.

=== Racial and ethnic composition ===
Laureles CDP, Texas – Racial and ethnic composition Note: the US Census treats Hispanic/Latino as an ethnic category. This table excludes Latinos from the racial categories and assigns them to a separate category. Hispanics/Latinos may be of any race.
Race / Ethnicity (NH = Non-Hispanic)	Pop 2000	Pop 2010	Pop 2020	% 2000	% 2010	% 2020
White alone (NH)	57	107	127	1.74%	2.90%	3.09%
Black or African American alone (NH)	0	2	2	0.00%	0.05%	0.05%
Native American or Alaska Native alone (NH)	6	6	0	0.18%	0.16%	0.00%
Asian alone (NH)	0	1	2	0.00%	0.03%	0.05%
Native Hawaiian or Pacific Islander alone (NH)	0	0	0	0.00%	0.00%	0.00%
Other race alone (NH)	0	4	6	0.00%	0.11%	0.15%
Mixed race or Multiracial (NH)	1	9	7	0.03%	0.24%	0.17%
Hispanic or Latino (any race)	3,221	3,563	3,967	98.05%	96.51%	96.50%
Total	3,285	3,692	4,111	100.00%	100.00%	100.00%

=== 2020 census ===
As of the 2020 census, Laureles had a population of 4,111. The median age was 30.6 years. 32.1% of residents were under the age of 18 and 8.7% of residents were 65 years of age or older. For every 100 females there were 100.9 males, and for every 100 females age 18 and over there were 98.4 males age 18 and over.

0.0% of residents lived in urban areas, while 100.0% lived in rural areas.

There were 1,080 households in Laureles, of which 53.4% had children under the age of 18 living in them. Of all households, 58.1% were married-couple households, 11.1% were households with a male householder and no spouse or partner present, and 24.8% were households with a female householder and no spouse or partner present. About 11.1% of all households were made up of individuals and 5.6% had someone living alone who was 65 years of age or older.

There were 1,183 housing units, of which 8.7% were vacant. The homeowner vacancy rate was 0.5% and the rental vacancy rate was 9.1%.

=== 2010 census ===
As of the census of 2010, there were 3,692 people, 753 households, and 692 families residing in the CDP. The population density was 676.6 inhabitants per square mile (261.2/km^{2}). There were 819 housing units at an average density of 168.7 per square mile (65.1/km^{2}). The racial makeup of the CDP was 97.66% White, 0.09% African American, 0.33% Native American, 1.04% from other races, and 0.88% from two or more races. Hispanic or Latino of any race were 98.05% of the population.

There were 753 households, out of which 64.9% had children under the age of 18 living with them, 71.2% were married couples living together, 15.8% had a female householder with no husband present, and 8.0% were non-families. 7.4% of all households were made up of individuals, and 2.8% had someone living alone who was 65 years of age or older. The average household size was 4.36 and the average family size was 4.56.

In the CDP, the population was spread out, with 42.0% under the age of 18, 12.0% from 18 to 24, 27.7% from 25 to 44, 13.6% from 45 to 64, and 4.6% who were 65 years of age or older. The median age was 22 years. For every 100 females, there were 94.1 males. For every 100 females age 18 and over, there were 88.0 males.

The median income for a household in the CDP was $20,172, and the median income for a family was $20,608. Males had a median income of $16,431 versus $13,255 for females. The per capita income for the CDP was $5,812. About 40.6% of families and 41.4% of the population were below the poverty line, including 49.8% of those under age 18 and 63.2% of those age 65 or over.

== Education ==
Laureles is served by the Los Fresnos Consolidated Independent School District.

In addition, South Texas Independent School District operates magnet schools that serve the community.
