= Murder of Javier Vega Jr. =

2014 murder of U.S. Border Patrol guard

- Born: June 17, 1978; La Feria, Texas, U.S.
- Died: August 3, 2014 (aged 36); Santa Monica, Texas, U.S.
- Cause of death: Murder by shooting

Javier Vega Jr. (June 17, 1978 – August 3, 2014) was an agent of the United States Border Patrol who was shot dead by Gustavo Tijerina Sandoval, an undocumented immigrant from Mexico, near Santa Monica, Texas, on August 3, 2014. His killer was sentenced to the death penalty, and Vega was honored as the namesake of a street in La Feria, Texas, and a Border Patrol checkpoint in Sarita, Texas.

== Early life ==
Vega was born on June 17, 1978, in La Feria, Cameron County, Texas. Prior to joining the Border Patrol, Vega had served in the United States Marine Corps. He was married, and he had three children.

Vega served in the Border Patrol from February 11, 2008, to August 3, 2014.

== Murder and convictions ==
While on an off-duty trip near Santa Monica in Willacy County, Texas, with his wife, children and parents, Vega was shot in the chest by Gustavo Tijerina Sandoval (born December 12, 1983), an illegal immigrant from Mexico, who also shot his father, Javier Vega Sr., in the hip. Tijerina Sandoval got into his car with an accomplice and drove away. Vega's father shot back at the two men's car, who continued to drive for a few miles until their car broke down. The father survived but Javier Vega Jr. died shortly after.

Tijerina Sandoval and another Mexican illegal immigrant, Ismael Hernandez Vallejo, who was with him at the time, were arrested the next day. The two men were originally from Matamoros, Tamaulipas. Tijerina Sandoval had four prior arrests for illegal entry into the United States. He had also been charged with reckless driving in December 2006 and failed to appear in court; the charge had been dropped in February 2013.

In September 2016, the National Border Patrol Council said USBP had redesignated Vega's death as "in line of duty", leading to federal compensation for his family.

The two Mexican men were given jury trials. Gustavo Tijerina Sandoval was sentenced to death on June 5, 2018, and Ismael Hernandez Vallejo was given a fifty-year prison sentence on January 15, 2019. As of 2025, Sandoval remains incarcerated at Federal Correctional Institution, Lompoc I in Lompoc, California. Tijerina-Sandoval was sentenced to death under Texas state law, and accordingly men sentenced to death under Texas state law are sent to the Allan B. Polunsky Unit.

== Legacy ==
On December 16, 2017, a street was renamed in his honor in La Feria, Texas.

On March 20, 2019, the Border Patrol checkpoint in Sarita, Texas, was renamed in his memory. The dedication was attended by Senators John Cornyn and Ted Cruz.

== See also ==
- Murders of Theodore L. Newton Jr. and George F. Azrak
