= Lasara, Texas =

- CDP
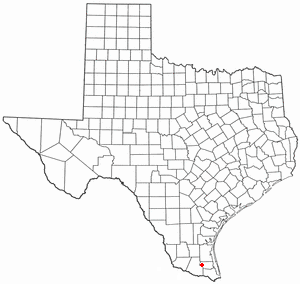
- Location of Lasara, Texas

- Coordinates: 26°27′56″N 97°54′43″W
- Country: United States
- State: Texas
- County: Willacy

Area
  - Total: 1.4 sq mi (3.6 km^{2})
  - Land: 1.4 sq mi (3.6 km^{2})
  - Water: 0 sq mi (0.0 km^{2})
- Elevation: 43 ft (13 m)

Population (2020)
  - Total: 909
  - Density: 650/sq mi (250/km^{2})
- Time zone: UTC-6 (Central (CST))
  - Summer (DST): UTC-5 (CDT)
- ZIP code: 78561
- Area code: 956
- FIPS code: 48-41548
- GNIS feature ID: 1339691

Lasara is a census-designated place (CDP) in Willacy County, Texas, United States. The population was 909 at the 2020 census.

Lasara was named after Laura Harding and Sarah Gill, the wives of German settlers William Harding and Lamar Gill.

== Geography ==
Lasara is located at 26°27′56″N 97°54′43″W (26.465449, -97.912001).

According to the United States Census Bureau, the CDP has a total area of 1.4 square miles (3.6 km^{2}), all land.

== Demographics ==
Historical population
| Census | Pop. | Note | %± |
|---|---|---|---|
| 2000 | 1,024 | | — |
| 2010 | 1,039 | | 1.5% |
| 2020 | 909 | | −12.5% |
U.S. Decennial Census; 1850–1900 1910; 1920 1930 1940; 1950 1960 1970; 1980 1990 2000; 2010 2020

Lasara first appeared as a census designated place in the 2000 U.S. census.

=== 2020 census ===
Lasara CDP, Texas – Racial and ethnic composition Note: the US Census treats Hispanic/Latino as an ethnic category. This table excludes Latinos from the racial categories and assigns them to a separate category. Hispanics/Latinos may be of any race.
| Race / Ethnicity (NH = Non-Hispanic) | Pop 2000 | Pop 2010 | Pop 2020 | % 2000 | % 2010 | % 2020 |
|---|---|---|---|---|---|---|
| White alone (NH) | 30 | 49 | 45 | 2.93% | 4.72% | 4.95% |
| Black or African American alone (NH) | 6 | 2 | 0 | 0.59% | 0.19% | 0.00% |
| Native American or Alaska Native alone (NH) | 5 | 1 | 1 | 0.49% | 0.10% | 0.11% |
| Asian alone (NH) | 1 | 0 | 0 | 0.10% | 0.00% | 0.00% |
| Native Hawaiian or Pacific Islander alone (NH) | 0 | 0 | 0 | 0.00% | 0.00% | 0.00% |
| Other race alone (NH) | 0 | 0 | 1 | 0.00% | 0.00% | 0.11% |
| Mixed race or Multiracial (NH) | 1 | 0 | 1 | 0.10% | 0.00% | 0.11% |
| Hispanic or Latino (any race) | 981 | 987 | 861 | 95.80% | 95.00% | 94.72% |
| Total | 1,024 | 1,039 | 909 | 100.00% | 100.00% | 100.00% |

=== 2000 census ===
As of the census of 2000, there were 1,024 people, 257 households, and 228 families residing in the CDP. The population density was 733.6 inhabitants per square mile (283.2/km^{2}). There were 295 housing units at an average density of 211.4 per square mile (81.6/km^{2}). The racial makeup of the CDP was 67.19% White, 0.68% African American, 0.68% Native American, 0.10% Asian, 29.59% from other races, and 1.76% from two or more races. Hispanic or Latino of any race were 95.80% of the population.

There were 257 households, out of which 57.6% had children under the age of 18 living with them, 71.2% were married couples living together, 14.0% had a female householder with no husband present, and 10.9% were non-families. 10.1% of all households were made up of individuals, and 5.1% had someone living alone who was 65 years of age or older. The average household size was 3.98 and the average family size was 4.28.

In the CDP, the population was spread out, with 40.6% under the age of 18, 10.6% from 18 to 24, 27.5% from 25 to 44, 11.2% from 45 to 64, and 10.0% who were 65 years of age or older. The median age was 24 years. For every 100 females, there were 95.8 males. For every 100 females age 18 and over, there were 93.0 males.

The median income for a household in the CDP was $17,794, and the median income for a family was $18,917. Males had a median income of $18,472 versus $12,917 for females. The per capita income for the CDP was $6,336. About 40.9% of families and 45.2% of the population were below the poverty line, including 54.1% of those under age 18 and 51.4% of those age 65 or over.

== Government and infrastructure ==
The United States Postal Service operates the Lasara Post Office.

== Education ==
Lasara is within the Lasara Independent School District (Pre-K through 12). Lasara ISD was approved on March 18, 1925.

Previously high school students went to Raymondville Independent School District or Lyford Consolidated Independent School District. Lasara ISD eventually received a high school, with 2011 being the year of the first graduation.

In addition, South Texas Independent School District operates magnet schools that serve Lasara and many surrounding communities.
