= LCISD =

LCISD can refer to:

- Lamar Consolidated Independent School District
- Lubbock-Cooper Independent School District
- Lyford Consolidated Independent School District
