= Yznaga, Texas =

- Census-designated place
- Coordinates: 26°18′45″N 97°49′4″W
- Country: United States
- State: Texas
- County: Cameron

Area
  - Total: 5.46 sq mi (14.15 km^{2})
  - Land: 5.45 sq mi (14.11 km^{2})
  - Water: 0.015 sq mi (0.04 km^{2})
- Elevation: 43 ft (13 m)

Population (2020)
  - Total: 108
  - Density: 19.8/sq mi (7.65/km^{2})
- Time zone: UTC-6 (Central (CST))
  - Summer (DST): UTC-5 (CDT)
- FIPS code: 48-80686
- GNIS feature ID: 1852784

Yznaga is a census-designated place (CDP) in Cameron County, Texas, United States. The population was 108 at the 2020 census. It is part of the Brownsville–Harlingen Metropolitan Statistical Area.

== Geography ==
Yznaga is located near the northwest corner of Cameron County at 26°18′45″N 97°49′4″W (26.312616, -97.817895). It is bordered to the north by Sebastian in Willacy County. Yznaga is 15 miles (24 km) northwest of Harlingen and 14 miles (23 km) south of Raymondville.

According to the United States Census Bureau, the CDP has a total area of 5.46 square miles (14.15 km^{2}), of which 5.45 square miles (14.11 km^{2}) is land and 0.02 square miles (0.04 km^{2}), or 0.28%, is water.

== Demographics ==
Historical population
Census	Pop.	Note	%±
2000	103		—
2010	91		−11.7%
2020	108		18.7%
U.S. Decennial Census; 1850–1900 1910; 1920 1930 1940; 1950 1960 1970; 1980 1990 2000; 2010 2020

Yznaga first appeared as a census designated place in the 2000 U.S. census.

=== 2020 census ===
Yznaga CDP, Texas – Racial and ethnic composition Note: the US Census treats Hispanic/Latino as an ethnic category. This table excludes Latinos from the racial categories and assigns them to a separate category. Hispanics/Latinos may be of any race.
Race / Ethnicity (NH = Non-Hispanic)	Pop 2000	Pop 2010	Pop 2020	% 2000	% 2010	% 2020
White alone (NH)	15	4	9	14.56%	4.40%	8.33%
Black or African American alone (NH)	0	0	0	0.00%	0.00%	0.00%
Native American or Alaska Native alone (NH)	0	0	0	0.00%	0.00%	0.00%
Asian alone (NH)	0	0	0	0.00%	0.00%	0.00%
Native Hawaiian or Pacific Islander alone (NH)	0	0	0	0.00%	0.00%	0.00%
Other race alone (NH)	0	0	0	0.00%	0.00%	0.00%
Mixed race or Multiracial (NH)	0	0	0	0.00%	0.00%	0.00%
Hispanic or Latino (any race)	88	87	99	85.44%	95.60%	91.67%
Total	103	91	108	100.00%	100.00%	100.00%

As of the census of 2000, there were 103 people, 34 households, and 28 families residing in the CDP. The population density was 19.0 people per square mile (7.3/km^{2}). There were 42 housing units at an average density of 7.7/sq mi (3.0/km^{2}). The racial makeup of the CDP was 71.84% White, 28.16% from other races. Hispanic or Latino of any race were 85.44% of the population.

There were 34 households, out of which 38.2% had children under the age of 18 living with them, 61.8% were married couples living together, 17.6% had a female householder with no husband present, and 17.6% were non-families. 14.7% of all households were made up of individuals, and 8.8% had someone living alone who was 65 years of age or older. The average household size was 3.03 and the average family size was 3.39.

In the CDP, the population was spread out, with 31.1% under the age of 18, 6.8% from 18 to 24, 29.1% from 25 to 44, 16.5% from 45 to 64, and 16.5% who were 65 years of age or older. The median age was 34 years. For every 100 females, there were 90.7 males. For every 100 females age 18 and over, there were 73.2 males.

The median income for a household in the CDP was $15,938, and the median income for a family was $23,250. Males had a median income of $28,333 versus $0 for females. The per capita income for the CDP was $9,695. There were 31.6% of families and 21.1% of the population living below the poverty line, including none under 18 and 50.0% of those over 64.

== Education ==
The Lyford Consolidated Independent School District serves the majority of the Yznaga CDP. A portion of the CDP is in the Santa Rosa Independent School District.

In addition, South Texas Independent School District operates magnet schools that serve the community.
