= John G. Willacy =

American politician

- Born: November 10, 1859; Louisville, Kentucky
- Died: September 19, 1943 (aged 83); San Antonio, Texas
- Resting place: San José Cemetery
- Occupation: Politician
- Political party: Democratic
- Spouse: Cordelia

John G. Willacy (November 10, 1859 – September 19, 1943) was a Texas Democratic politician. He introduced legislation which created Willacy County, which is his namesake. He also introduced legislation which gave local political jurisdictions, typically counties or municipalities, the power to make decisions on certain controversial issues based on popular vote within their borders. In practice, it usually relates to the issue of alcoholic beverage sales, which in the 1920s and 30s was a controversial issue, especially as prohibition in the United States was in effect.
