= Willacy County, Texas =

County in Texas, United States

- County
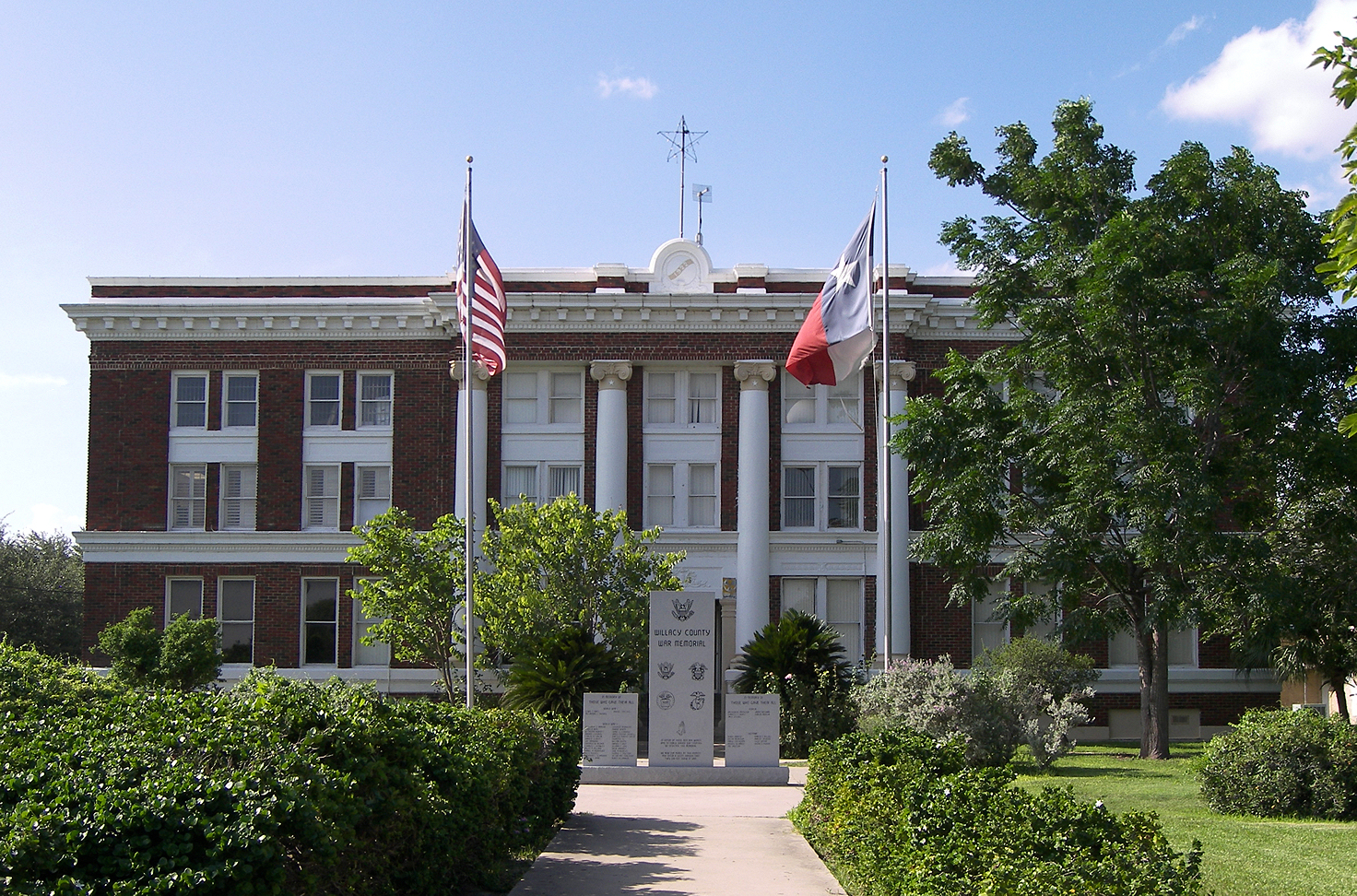
- The Willacy County Courthouse in Raymondville

- Location within the U.S. state of Texas
- Coordinates: 26°29′N 97°36′W
- Country: United States
- State: Texas
- Founded: 1912
- Named for: John G. Willacy
- Seat: Raymondville
- Largest city: Raymondville

Area
  - Total: 784 sq mi (2,030 km^{2})
  - Land: 591 sq mi (1,530 km^{2})
  - Water: 194 sq mi (500 km^{2}) 25%

Population (2020)
  - Total: 20,164
  - Estimate (2025): 19,971 ▼
  - Density: 34.1/sq mi (13.2/km^{2})
- Time zone: UTC−6 (Central)
  - Summer (DST): UTC−5 (CDT)
- Congressional district: 34th
- Website: www.co.willacy.tx.us

Willacy County is a county in the U.S. state of Texas. As of the 2020 census, its population was 20,164. Its county seat is Raymondville. The county was created in 1911 and organized the next year.

Willacy County comprises the Raymondville micropolitan statistical area, which is included in the Brownsville-Harlingen-Raymondville combined statistical area, which itself is part of the larger Rio Grande Valley region.

== History ==
Willacy County was formed in 1911 from parts of Cameron and Hidalgo Counties, and originally included what is now Kenedy County; it was named for state senator John G. Willacy. Kenedy was split from Willacy in 1921, when the long-settled ranchers of the northern (Kenedy) part of the county sought to separate from the newly arrived farmers of the southern part.

The Bermuda onion was introduced to Willacy County in 1912. It grew well and slowly displaced ranchland in the southern part of the county, becoming the most important crop. For many years, the town of Raymondville held an annual Onion Festival, using the tag line, "The Breath of a Nation". In 1940, the first oil wells were sunk in the county's Willamar Oil Field; today, oil production is a major part of the local economy, although increasingly eclipsed by natural gas. Also in the 1940s, sorghum was introduced to the county, gradually displacing cotton and other crops. Cattle ranching remains a substantial economic activity, as well.

In the early 2010s, wind turbines began to be built in the rural part of the county east of U.S. Highway 77, a number expanded later in 2020. The turbines became an icon to the county's identity, with their being visible from northern Cameron County and eastern Hidalgo County. Power-line infrastructure was also improved in this period.

In recent years, the county has come under scrutiny for police deaths with two in custody deaths in two years. In 2023, the county paid $1,000,000.00 to the family of John Ray Zamora after Zamora died in custody according to attorney Israel G. Perez III.

== Geography ==
According to the U.S. Census Bureau, the county has a total area of 784 sq mi (2,030 km^{2}), of which 194 square miles (500 km^{2}) (25%) are covered by water. The county borders the Gulf of Mexico.

=== Major highways ===
- Interstate 69E/U.S. Highway 77
- State Highway 186
- Spur 56
- Spur 112
- Spur 413
- Farm to Market Road 498

=== Adjacent counties ===
- Kenedy County (north)
- Cameron County (south)
- Hidalgo County (west)

=== National protected areas ===
- Laguna Atascosa National Wildlife Refuge (part)
- Padre Island National Seashore (part)

== Demographics ==
Historical population
Census	Pop.	Note	%±
1930	10,499		—
1940	13,230		26.0%
1950	20,920		58.1%
1960	20,084		−4.0%
1970	15,570		−22.5%
1980	17,495		12.4%
1990	17,705		1.2%
2000	20,082		13.4%
2010	22,134		10.2%
2020	20,164		−8.9%
2025 (est.)	19,971	▼	−1.0%
U.S. Decennial Census; 1850–2010 2010 2020

=== Racial and ethnic composition ===
Willacy County, Florida – Racial and ethnic composition Note: the US Census treats Hispanic/Latino as an ethnic category. This table excludes Latinos from the racial categories and assigns them to a separate category. Hispanics/Latinos may be of any race.
Race / Ethnicity (NH = Non-Hispanic)	Pop 1980	Pop 1990	Pop 2000	Pop 2010	Pop 2020	% 1980	% 1990	% 2000	% 2010	% 2020
White alone (NH)	3,310	2,648	2,350	2,235	1,805	18.92%	14.96%	11.70%	10.10%	8.95%
Black or African American alone (NH)	84	73	401	389	445	0.48%	0.41%	2.00%	1.76%	2.21%
Native American or Alaska Native alone (NH)	15	8	24	22	47	0.09%	0.05%	0.12%	0.10%	0.23%
Asian alone (NH)	7	11	21	134	160	0.04%	0.06%	0.10%	0.61%	0.79%
Native Hawaiian or Pacific Islander alone (NH)	x	x	0	1	2	x	x	0.00%	0.00%	0.01%
Other race alone (NH)	30	28	14	9	34	0.17%	0.16%	0.07%	0.04%	0.17%
Mixed race or Multiracial (NH)	x	x	63	47	60	x	x	0.31%	0.21%	0.30%
Hispanic or Latino (any race)	14,049	14,937	17,209	19,297	17,611	80.30%	84.37%	85.69%	87.18%	87.34%
Total	17,495	17,705	20,082	22,134	20,164	100.00%	100.00%	100.00%	100.00%	100.00%

=== 2020 census ===
As of the 2020 census, the county had a population of 20,164. The median age was 36.3 years. 23.2% of residents were under the age of 18 and 15.8% of residents were 65 years of age or older. For every 100 females there were 112.1 males, and for every 100 females age 18 and over there were 116.1 males age 18 and over.

The racial makeup of the county was 43.4% White, 2.5% Black or African American, 0.7% American Indian and Alaska Native, 0.8% Asian, <0.1% Native Hawaiian and Pacific Islander, 21.9% from some other race, and 30.7% from two or more races. Hispanic or Latino residents of any race comprised 87.3% of the population.

There were 5,714 households in the county, of which 39.5% had children under the age of 18 living in them. Of all households, 47.0% were married-couple households, 16.5% were households with a male householder and no spouse or partner present, and 30.6% were households with a female householder and no spouse or partner present. About 20.6% of all households were made up of individuals and 11.9% had someone living alone who was 65 years of age or older.

There were 6,770 housing units, of which 15.6% were vacant. Among occupied housing units, 74.5% were owner-occupied and 25.5% were renter-occupied. The homeowner vacancy rate was 1.2% and the rental vacancy rate was 11.7%.

64.4% of residents lived in urban areas, while 35.6% lived in rural areas.

=== 2010 census ===
As of the 2010 United States census, 22,134 people, 5,764 households, and 4,607 families were living in the county. Of all households, 46.0% had children under 18 living with them, 54.5% were married couples living together, 19.3% had a female householder with no husband present, 6.1% had a male householder no wife, and 20.1% were not families. About 32.9% of all households contained an individual who was 65 years of age or older. The average household size was 3.28, and the average family size was 3.73.

Of the population, 85.8% of residents were White (10.1% non-Hispanic white), 2.1% Black or African American, 0.6% Asian, 0.3% Native American, 9.3% of some other race and 1.8% of two or more races. 87.2% of residents were Hispanic or Latino (of any race).

In the county, the age distribution was 26.8% under 18, 12.3% from 18 to 24, 27.8% from 25 to 44, 21.4% from 45 to 64, and 11.7% who were 65 or older. The median age was 32 years.

The median income for a household in the county was $22,881, and for a family was $25,399. The per capita income for the county was $10,800. 39.4% of families and 43.4% of the population were below the poverty line, including 50.5% of those under age 18 and 38.3% of those age 65 or over. The county's per-capita income makes it among the poorest counties in the United States.

== Education ==
School districts that serve Willacy County include:

- Lasara Independent School District
- Lyford Consolidated Independent School District
- Raymondville Independent School District
- San Perlita Independent School District

In addition, residents are allowed to apply for magnet schools operated by the South Texas Independent School District.

All of the county is in the service area of Texas Southmost College.

== Media ==
- Raymondville Chronicle & Willacy County News – Official Site
- KFRQ 94.5FM – Official Site
- KKPS 99.5FM – Official Site
- KNVO 101.1FM – Official Site
- KVLY 107.9FM – Official Site

== Prisons ==
Raymondville is the location of three private prisons, all adjacent to each other:

- the Willacy County Correctional Center (closed 2015)
- the Willacy County Regional Detention Center
- and Willacy County State Jail

== Politics ==
Like most majority-Hispanic counties in the Rio Grande Valley, Willacy is a staunchly Democratic county. However, in recent years the county has voted increasingly more Republican, keeping up with the trend of other counties in the Rio Grande Valley. Republican candidate Donald Trump would win the county in the 2024 presidential election. The only other times the county voted for the Republican candidate were in 1972 with Richard Nixon and Dwight D. Eisenhower's victories in 1952 and 1956.

United States presidential election results for Willacy County, Texas
Year	Republican		Democratic		Third party(ies)	
Year	No.	%	No.	%	No.	%
1912	5	4.67%	102	95.33%	0	0.00%
1916	10	8.33%	110	91.67%	0	0.00%
1920	9	14.52%	53	85.48%	0	0.00%
1924	110	25.35%	307	70.74%	17	3.92%
1928	389	49.55%	396	50.45%	0	0.00%
1932	259	19.89%	1,042	80.03%	1	0.08%
1936	376	26.88%	1,002	71.62%	21	1.50%
1940	740	38.54%	1,173	61.09%	7	0.36%
1944	754	43.41%	846	48.70%	137	7.89%
1948	676	35.14%	1,139	59.20%	109	5.67%
1952	2,244	62.79%	1,324	37.05%	6	0.17%
1956	1,656	56.17%	1,261	42.77%	31	1.05%
1960	1,367	39.20%	2,109	60.48%	11	0.32%
1964	1,230	36.30%	2,152	63.52%	6	0.18%
1968	1,243	34.17%	1,930	53.05%	465	12.78%
1972	2,317	62.12%	1,384	37.10%	29	0.78%
1976	1,542	33.84%	2,984	65.48%	31	0.68%
1980	1,995	39.06%	3,047	59.65%	66	1.29%
1984	2,340	43.41%	3,037	56.33%	14	0.26%
1988	1,750	35.43%	3,165	64.07%	25	0.51%
1992	1,490	27.04%	3,359	60.96%	661	12.00%
1996	1,332	24.62%	3,789	70.02%	290	5.36%
2000	1,789	35.34%	3,218	63.57%	55	1.09%
2004	2,209	44.52%	2,734	55.10%	19	0.38%
2008	1,456	29.70%	3,409	69.53%	38	0.78%
2012	1,416	27.96%	3,600	71.09%	48	0.95%
2016	1,547	30.36%	3,422	67.16%	126	2.47%
2020	2,441	43.67%	3,108	55.60%	41	0.73%
2024	2,856	51.34%	2,673	48.05%	34	0.61%

United States Senate election results for Willacy County, Texas1
Year	Republican		Democratic		Third party(ies)	
Year	No.	%	No.	%	No.	%
2024	2,365	43.67%	2,892	53.41%	158	2.92%

United States Senate election results for Willacy County, Texas2
Year	Republican		Democratic		Third party(ies)	
Year	No.	%	No.	%	No.	%
2020	2,183	41.27%	2,968	56.12%	138	2.61%

Texas Gubernatorial election results for Willacy County
Year	Republican		Democratic		Third party(ies)	
Year	No.	%	No.	%	No.	%
2022	1,656	43.13%	2,138	55.68%	46	1.20%

== Communities ==
=== Cities ===
- Lyford
- Raymondville (county seat)
- San Perlita

=== Census-designated places ===
- Lasara
- Los Angeles
- Port Mansfield
- Ranchette Estates
- Santa Monica
- Sebastian
- Zapata Ranch

=== Unincorporated community ===
- Lyford South

== See also ==
- National Register of Historic Places listings in Willacy County, Texas
- Recorded Texas Historic Landmarks in Willacy County
