= Ranchette Estates, Texas =

- CDP
- Coordinates: 26°29′4″N 97°49′19″W
- Country: United States
- State: Texas
- County: Willacy

Area
  - Total: 0.62 sq mi (1.6 km^{2})
  - Land: 0.62 sq mi (1.6 km^{2})
  - Water: 0 sq mi (0.0 km^{2})
- Elevation: 36 ft (11 m)

Population (2020)
  - Total: 106
  - Density: 170/sq mi (66/km^{2})
- Time zone: UTC-6 (Central (CST))
  - Summer (DST): UTC-5 (CDT)
- Zip Code: 78580
- FIPS code: 48-60458
- GNIS feature ID: 1852753

Ranchette Estates is a census-designated place (CDP) in Willacy County, Texas, United States. The population was 106 at the 2020 census.

== Geography ==
Ranchette Estates is located at 26°29′4″N 97°49′19″W (26.484386, -97.821953).

According to the United States Census Bureau, the CDP has a total area of 0.6 square mile (1.6 km^{2}), all land. The CDP lost a small portion of its area, the southeastern corner below TX-186 prior to the 2010 census.

== Demographics ==
Historical population
Census	Pop.	Note	%±
2000	133		—
2010	152		14.3%
2020	106		−30.3%
U.S. Decennial Census; 1850–1900 1910; 1920 1930 1940; 1950 1960 1970; 1980 1990 2000; 2010

Ranchette Estates first appeared as a census designated place in the 2000 U.S. census.

=== 2020 census ===
Ranchette Estates CDP, Texas – Racial and ethnic composition Note: the US Census treats Hispanic/Latino as an ethnic category. This table excludes Latinos from the racial categories and assigns them to a separate category. Hispanics/Latinos may be of any race.
Race / Ethnicity (NH = Non-Hispanic)	Pop 2000	Pop 2010	Pop 2020	% 2000	% 2010	% 2020
White alone (NH)	7	3	0	5.26%	1.97%	0.00%
Black or African American alone (NH)	0	0	0	0.00%	0.00%	0.00%
Native American or Alaska Native alone (NH)	0	1	0	0.00%	0.66%	0.00%
Asian alone (NH)	0	0	1	0.00%	0.00%	0.94%
Native Hawaiian or Pacific Islander alone (NH)	0	0	0	0.00%	0.00%	0.00%
Other race alone (NH)	0	0	0	0.00%	0.00%	0.00%
Mixed race or Multiracial (NH)	0	2	2	0.00%	1.32%	1.89%
Hispanic or Latino (any race)	126	146	103	94.74%	96.05%	97.17%
Total	133	152	106	100.00%	100.00%	100.00%

=== 2000 census ===
As of the census of 2000, there were 133 people, 32 households, and 28 families residing in the CDP. The population density was 216.7 inhabitants per square mile (83.7/km^{2}). There were 33 housing units at an average density of 53.8 per square mile (20.8/km^{2}). The racial makeup of the CDP was 72.93% White, 4.51% Native American, 3.76% Pacific Islander, 12.78% from other races, and 6.02% from two or more races. Hispanic or Latino of any race were 94.74% of the population.

There were 32 households, out of which 71.9% had children under the age of 18 living with them, 68.8% were married couples living together, 15.6% had a female householder with no husband present, and 12.5% were non-families. 12.5% of all households were made up of individuals, and 6.3% had someone living alone who was 65 years of age or older. The average household size was 4.16 and the average family size was 4.54.

In the CDP, the population was spread out, with 45.1% under the age of 18, 12.0% from 18 to 24, 27.8% from 25 to 44, 11.3% from 45 to 64, and 3.8% who were 65 years of age or older. The median age was 20 years. For every 100 females, there were 101.5 males. For every 100 females age 18 and over, there were 87.2 males.

The median income for a household in the CDP was $25,250, and the median income for a family was $25,250. Males had a median income of $26,250 versus $6,250 for females. The per capita income for the CDP was $4,605. There were 48.4% of families and 51.4% of the population living below the poverty line, including 64.5% of those under 18 and none of those over 64.

== Education ==
Ranchette Estates is served by the Raymondville Independent School District.

In addition, South Texas Independent School District operates magnet schools that serve the community.
