= Lasara Independent School District =

School district in Texas, United States

Address
- 6160 East Sixth Street Lasara, Texas, 78561; United States

District information
- Grades: PK–12
- Schools: 2
- NCES District ID: 4826850

Students and staff
- Students: 356 (2023–2024)
- Teachers: 33.85 (on an FTE basis)
- Student–teacher ratio: 10.52:1

Other information
- Website: www.lasaraisd.net

Lasara Independent School District is a public school district based in the community of Lasara in unincorporated Willacy County, Texas, United States.

The district has one school - Lasara Elementary - that serves students in grades pre-kindergarten through twelfth grade in 2010.

Lasara High School's doors opened in the second semester of the 2007–2008 school year. Lasara ISD had its first Seniors graduating in 2011.

Previously twelfth grade students had the option of attending either Raymondville High School in the Raymondville Independent School District, Lyford High School in the Lyford Consolidated Independent School District, or the Science Academies Magnet Schools (South Texas Independent School District); the last option is still open to all Willacy County residents.

In 2009, the school district was rated "recognized" by the Texas Education Agency.

== See also ==
- Non-high school district
