= San Perlita, Texas =

- City
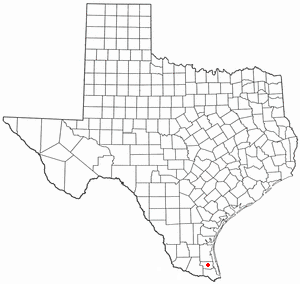
- Location of San Perlita, Texas

- Coordinates: 26°30′2″N 97°38′36″W
- Country: United States
- State: Texas
- County: Willacy

Area
  - Total: 0.52 sq mi (1.35 km^{2})
  - Land: 0.52 sq mi (1.35 km^{2})
  - Water: 0 sq mi (0.00 km^{2})
- Elevation: 20 ft (6 m)

Population (2020)
  - Total: 538
  - Density: 1,030/sq mi (399/km^{2})
- Time zone: UTC-6 (Central (CST))
  - Summer (DST): UTC-5 (CDT)
- ZIP code: 78590
- Area code: 956
- FIPS code: 48-65636
- GNIS feature ID: 1346465
- Website: cityofsanperlita.com

San Perlita (Santa Perlita) is a city in Willacy County, Texas, United States. The population was 538 at the 2020 census. It may be included as part of the Brownsville–Harlingen–Raymondville and the Matamoros–Brownsville metropolitan areas.

== Geography ==
San Perlita is located at 26°30′2″N 97°38′36″W (26.500515, –97.643223).

According to the United States Census Bureau, the city has a total area of 0.5 square mile (1.3 km^{2}), all land.

== Demographics ==
Historical population
| Census | Pop. | Note | %± |
|---|---|---|---|
| 1960 | 348 | | — |
| 1970 | 352 | | 1.1% |
| 1980 | 475 | | 34.9% |
| 1990 | 512 | | 7.8% |
| 2000 | 680 | | 32.8% |
| 2010 | 573 | | −15.7% |
| 2020 | 538 | | −6.1% |
U.S. Decennial Census; 1850–1900 1910; 1920 1930 1940; 1950 1960 1970; 1980 1990 2000; 2010

=== 2020 census ===
As of the 2020 census, there were 538 people, 155 households, and 126 families residing in the city. The median age was 37.1 years, with 25.5% of residents under the age of 18 and 14.7% of residents 65 years of age or older.

For every 100 females there were 114.3 males, and for every 100 females age 18 and over there were 112.2 males age 18 and over.

0.0% of residents lived in urban areas, while 100.0% lived in rural areas.

There were 155 households in San Perlita, of which 45.8% had children under the age of 18 living in them. Of all households, 47.7% were married-couple households, 16.1% were households with a male householder and no spouse or partner present, and 31.0% were households with a female householder and no spouse or partner present. About 9.1% of all households were made up of individuals and 1.9% had someone living alone who was 65 years of age or older.

There were 173 housing units, of which 10.4% were vacant. The homeowner vacancy rate was 0.0% and the rental vacancy rate was 0.0%.

Racial composition as of the 2020 census
| Race | Number | Percent |
|---|---|---|
| White | 307 | 57.1% |
| Black or African American | 9 | 1.7% |
| American Indian and Alaska Native | 1 | 0.2% |
| Asian | 0 | 0.0% |
| Native Hawaiian and Other Pacific Islander | 0 | 0.0% |
| Some other race | 61 | 11.3% |
| Two or more races | 160 | 29.7% |
| Hispanic or Latino (of any race) | 514 | 95.5% |

=== 2000 census ===
As of the census of 2000, there were 680 people, 169 households, and 148 families residing in the city. The population density was 1,339.0 inhabitants per square mile (517.0/km^{2}). There were 188 housing units at an average density of 370.2 per square mile (142.9/km^{2}). The racial makeup of the city was 76.91% White, 2.21% African American, 0.59% Native American, 17.79% from other races, and 2.50% from two or more races.

There were 169 households, out of which 46.2% had children under the age of 18 living with them, 68.6% were married couples living together, 14.2% had a female householder with no husband present, and 12.4% were non-families. 10.1% of all households were made up of individuals, and 7.1% had someone living alone who was 65 years of age or older. The average household size was 4.02 and the average family size was 4.32.

In the city, the population was spread out, with 36.6% under the age of 18, 12.9% from 18 to 24, 25.1% from 25 to 44, 17.8% from 45 to 64, and 7.5% who were 65 years of age or older. The median age was 25 years. For every 100 females, there were 94.3 males. For every 100 females age 18 and over, there were 91.6 males.

The median income for a household in the city was $22,500, and the median income for a family was $23,542. Males had a median income of $19,236 versus $14,531 for females. The per capita income for the city was $6,761. About 31.3% of families and 39.5% of the population were below the poverty line, including 53.4% of those under age 18 and 32.7% of those age 65 or over.

== Government and infrastructure ==
The United States Postal Service operates the San Perlita Post Office.

== Education ==
San Perlita is served by the San Perlita Independent School District.

In addition, South Texas Independent School District operates magnet schools that serve the community.
