= Los Angeles, Willacy County, Texas =

Los Angeles, Texas
- CDP
- Coordinates: 26°29′41″N 97°47′11″W
- Country: United States
- State: Texas
- County: Willacy

Area
  - Total: 0.15 sq mi (0.4 km^{2})
  - Land: 0.15 sq mi (0.4 km^{2})
  - Water: 0 sq mi (0.0 km^{2})
- Elevation: 30 ft (9 m)

Population (2020)
  - Total: 108
  - Density: 700/sq mi (270/km^{2})
- Time zone: UTC-6 (Central (CST))
  - Summer (DST): UTC-5 (CDT)
- Zip Code: 78580
- FIPS code: 48-44074
- GNIS feature ID: 1852733

Los Angeles is a census-designated place (CDP) in Willacy County, Texas, United States. The population was 108 at the 2020 census. Prior to the 2010 census, the CDP was known as Los Angeles Subdivision.

== Geography ==
Los Angeles is located at 26°29′41″N 97°47′11″W (26.494811, -97.786310).

According to the United States Census Bureau, the CDP has a total area of 0.2 square mile (0.4 km^{2}), all land.

== Demographics ==
Historical population
Census	Pop.	Note	%±
2000	86		—
2010	121		40.7%
2020	108		−10.7%
U.S. Decennial Census; 1850–1900 1910; 1920 1930 1940; 1950 1960 1970; 1980 1990 2000; 2010 2020

Los Angeles first appeared as a census designated place under the name Los Angeles Subdivision in the 2000 U.S. census. The name was changed to Los Angeles in the 2010 U.S. census.

=== 2020 census ===
Los Angeles CDP, Texas – Racial and ethnic composition Note: the US Census treats Hispanic/Latino as an ethnic category. This table excludes Latinos from the racial categories and assigns them to a separate category. Hispanics/Latinos may be of any race.
Race / Ethnicity (NH = Non-Hispanic)	Pop 2000	Pop 2010	Pop 2020	% 2000	% 2010	% 2020
White alone (NH)	5	0	1	5.81%	0.00%	0.93%
Black or African American alone (NH)	0	0	0	0.00%	0.00%	0.00%
Native American or Alaska Native alone (NH)	0	0	0	0.00%	0.00%	0.00%
Asian alone (NH)	0	0	0	0.00%	0.00%	0.00%
Native Hawaiian or Pacific Islander alone (NH)	0	0	0	0.00%	0.00%	0.00%
Other race alone (NH)	0	0	0	0.00%	0.00%	0.00%
Mixed race or Multiracial (NH)	0	0	0	0.00%	0.00%	0.00%
Hispanic or Latino (any race)	81	121	107	94.19%	100.00%	99.07%
Total	86	121	108	100.00%	100.00%	100.00%

=== 2000 census ===
As of the census of 2000, there were 86 people, 23 households, and 20 families residing in the CDP. The population density was 520.5 inhabitants per square mile (201.0/km^{2}). There were 34 housing units at an average density of 205.8 per square mile (79.5/km^{2}). The racial makeup of the CDP was 43.02% White, 56.98% from other races. Hispanic or Latino of any race were 94.19% of the population.

There were 23 households, out of which 65.2% had children under the age of 18 living with them, 52.2% were married couples living together, 26.1% had a female householder with no husband present, and 8.7% were non-families. 8.7% of all households were made up of individuals, and 4.3% had someone living alone who was 65 years of age or older. The average household size was 3.74 and the average family size was 3.95.

In the CDP, the population was spread out, with 44.2% under the age of 18, 16.3% from 18 to 24, 27.9% from 25 to 44, 7.0% from 45 to 64, and 4.7% who were 65 years of age or older. The median age was 22 years. For every 100 females, there were 100.0 males. For every 100 females age 18 and over, there were 108.7 males.

The median income for a household in the CDP was $4,500, and the median income for a family was $3,250. Males had a median income of $8,750 versus $0 for females. The per capita income for the CDP was $2,701. There were 100.0% of families and 100.0% of the population living below the poverty line, including 100.0% of under 18 and none of those over 65.

== Education ==
Los Angeles is a part of the Raymondville Independent School District.

In addition, South Texas Independent School District operates magnet schools that serve the community.
