= Murders of Theodore L. Newton Jr. and George F. Azrak =

1967 murder of U.S. Border Patrol agents

Theodore L. Newton Jr. and George F. Azrak were two agents of the United States Border Patrol who were kidnapped and murdered by marijuana smugglers on June 17, 1967, near Anza, California. They are the namesakes of the Theodore L. Newton Jr. and George F. Azrak Station in Murrieta, California, and the Newton-Azrak Award for Heroism.

== Kidnapping, murders and convictions ==
On June 17, 1967, Newton and Azrak stopped a car loaded with 800 lb (360 kg) of marijuana in Oak Grove, San Diego County, California. The two men were kidnapped by individuals in the car they had stopped as well as a second car, and taken to a mountain cabin, where they were handcuffed and shot dead. Newton was shot in the back of the head once, and Azrak was shot in the back of the head twice as well as in the chest once. A 200-man search ensued, and they were found on the Howard Bailey Ranch adjacent to the Cahuilla Band of Mission Indians of the Cahuilla Reservation near Anza, Riverside County, California.

Newton was a 26-year-old father of two who had served as a Border Patrol agent for a year, and Azrak was a 22-year-old trainee. They were the 46th and 47th Border Patrol agents to die in the line of duty in the history of the USBP. The 45th casualty dated back to 1952.

The two criminals in the first car were arrested in Los Angeles on July 16, 1967, and convicted and sentenced to life in prison. The two men in the second car were arrested in the Mexican state of Sonora and given thirty-year sentences for second-degree murder.

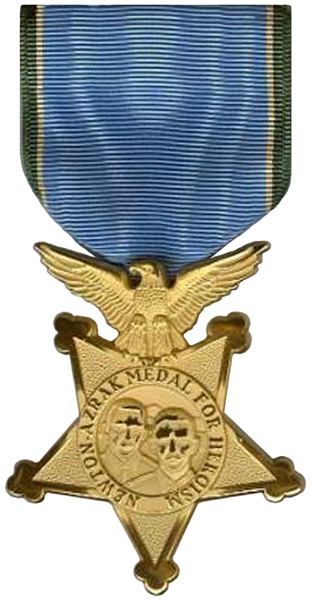
The Newton-Azrak Award for Heroism.

== Legacy ==
Since their deaths, Border Patrol agents man checkpoints in teams of at least three.

In 1968, Supreme Court Justice Tom C. Clark honored Newton with the Liberty Bell Award on behalf of the Immigration and Naturalization Service posthumously.

For its 30th anniversary in 1997, 20 Border Patrol agents honored Newton and Azrak at the checkpoint and the cabin.

The Newton-Azrak Award for Heroism was named in their honor posthumously. As of 2019, it has been awarded to more than 150 agents.

A commemorative plaque with their pictures reading "Died in the line of duty, June 17, 1967" was installed in the Border Patrol office in Temecula, California.

On April 24, 2009, the Border Patrol station in Murrieta, California, was renamed the Theodore L. Newton Jr. and George F. Azrak Station.

== See also ==
- List of homicides in California
- Murder of Javier Vega Jr.
