= Zapata Ranch, Texas =

- CDP
- Coordinates: 26°21′38″N 97°49′15″W
- Country: United States
- State: Texas
- County: Willacy

Area
  - Total: 1.4 sq mi (3.6 km^{2})
  - Land: 1.4 sq mi (3.6 km^{2})
  - Water: 0 sq mi (0.0 km^{2})
- Elevation: 39 ft (12 m)

Population (2020)
  - Total: 87
  - Density: 63/sq mi (24/km^{2})
- Time zone: UTC-6 (Central (CST))
  - Summer (DST): UTC-5 (CDT)
- Zip Code: 78569
- FIPS code: 48-80722
- GNIS feature ID: 1852785

Zapata Ranch is a census-designated place (CDP) in Willacy County, Texas, United States. The population was 87 at the 2020 census.

== Geography ==
Zapata Ranch is located at 26°21′38″N 97°49′15″W (26.360498, -97.820948).

According to the United States Census Bureau, the CDP has a total area of 1.4 square miles (3.7 km^{2}), all land.

== Demographics ==
Historical population
Census	Pop.	Note	%±
2000	88		—
2010	108		22.7%
2020	87		−19.4%
U.S. Decennial Census; 1850–1900 1910; 1920 1930 1940; 1950 1960 1970; 1980 1990 2000; 2010 2020

Zapata Ranch first appeared as a census designated place in the 2000 U.S. census.

=== 2020 census ===
Zapata Ranch CDP, Texas – Racial and ethnic composition Note: the US Census treats Hispanic/Latino as an ethnic category. This table excludes Latinos from the racial categories and assigns them to a separate category. Hispanics/Latinos may be of any race.
Race / Ethnicity (NH = Non-Hispanic)	Pop 2000	Pop 2010	Pop 2020	% 2000	% 2010	% 2020
White alone (NH)	14	2	8	15.91%	1.85%	9.20%
Black or African American alone (NH)	3	0	0	3.41%	0.00%	0.00%
Native American or Alaska Native alone (NH)	0	0	2	0.00%	0.00%	2.30%
Asian alone (NH)	0	0	0	0.00%	0.00%	0.00%
Native Hawaiian or Pacific Islander alone (NH)	0	0	0	0.00%	0.00%	0.00%
Other race alone (NH)	0	0	0	0.00%	0.00%	0.00%
Mixed race or Multiracial (NH)	0	0	0	0.00%	0.00%	0.00%
Hispanic or Latino (any race)	71	106	77	80.68%	98.15%	88.51%
Total	88	108	87	100.00%	100.00%	100.00%

=== 2000 census ===
As of the census of 2000, there were 88 people, 28 households, and 22 families residing in the CDP. The population density was 62.5 inhabitants per square mile (24.1/km^{2}). There were 31 housing units at an average density of 22.0/sq mi (8.5/km^{2}). The racial makeup of the CDP was 77.27% White, 3.41% African American, 19.32% from other races. Hispanic or Latino of any race were 80.68% of the population.

There were 28 households, out of which 39.3% had children under the age of 18 living with them, 46.4% were married couples living together, 17.9% had a female householder with no husband present, and 21.4% were non-families. 21.4% of all households were made up of individuals, and 17.9% had someone living alone who was 65 years of age or older. The average household size was 3.14 and the average family size was 3.73.

In the CDP, the population was spread out, with 31.8% under the age of 18, 10.2% from 18 to 24, 28.4% from 25 to 44, 14.8% from 45 to 64, and 14.8% who were 65 years of age or older. The median age was 33 years. For every 100 females, there were 100.0 males. For every 100 females age 18 and over, there were 114.3 males.

The median income for a household in the CDP was $14,444, and the median income for a family was $20,500. Males had a median income of $14,191 versus $9,417 for females. The per capita income for the CDP was $10,206. None of the population or families were below the poverty line.

== Education ==
Zapata Ranch is served by the Lyford Consolidated Independent School District.

In addition, South Texas Independent School District operates magnet schools that serve the community.
