= Santa Monica, Texas =

- CDP
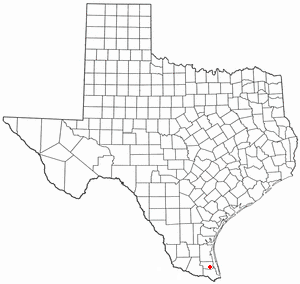
- Location of Santa Monica, Texas

- Coordinates: 26°21′56″N 97°35′24″W
- Country: United States
- State: Texas
- County: Willacy

Area
  - Total: 1.0 sq mi (2.6 km^{2})
  - Land: 1.0 sq mi (2.6 km^{2})
  - Water: 0.0 sq mi (0 km^{2})
- Elevation: 16 ft (5 m)

Population (2020)
  - Total: 86
  - Density: 86/sq mi (33/km^{2})
- Time zone: UTC-6 (Central (CST))
  - Summer (DST): UTC-5 (CDT)
- ZIP code: 78569
- Area code: 956
- FIPS code: 48-65756
- GNIS feature ID: 1346660

Santa Monica is a census-designated place (CDP) in Willacy County, Texas, United States. The population was 86 at the 2020 census.

== Geography ==
Santa Monica is located at 26°21′56″N 97°35′24″W (26.365423, -97.590031).

According to the United States Census Bureau in 2000, the CDP has a total area of 0.3 square mile (0.9 km^{2}), all land. The CDP gained area prior to the 2010 census, increasing its total area to 1.0 square mile (2.6 km^{2}), all land as before.

== Demographics ==
Historical population
Census	Pop.	Note	%±
2000	78		—
2010	83		6.4%
2020	86		3.6%
U.S. Decennial Census; 1850–1900 1910; 1920 1930 1940; 1950 1960 1970; 1980 1990 2000; 2010 2020

Santa Monica first appeared as a census designated place in the 2000 U.S. census.

=== 2020 census ===
Santa Monica CDP, Texas – Racial and ethnic composition Note: the US Census treats Hispanic/Latino as an ethnic category. This table excludes Latinos from the racial categories and assigns them to a separate category. Hispanics/Latinos may be of any race.
Race / Ethnicity (NH = Non-Hispanic)	Pop 2000	Pop 2010	Pop 2020	% 2000	% 2010	% 2020
White alone (NH)	12	13	9	15.38%	15.66%	10.47%
Black or African American alone (NH)	0	0	0	0.00%	0.00%	0.00%
Native American or Alaska Native alone (NH)	0	0	0	0.00%	0.00%	0.00%
Asian alone (NH)	0	0	0	0.00%	0.00%	0.00%
Native Hawaiian or Pacific Islander alone (NH)	0	0	0	0.00%	0.00%	0.00%
Other race alone (NH)	0	0	1	0.00%	0.00%	1.16%
Mixed race or Multiracial (NH)	0	0	1	0.00%	0.00%	1.16%
Hispanic or Latino (any race)	66	70	75	84.62%	84.34%	87.21%
Total	78	83	86	100.00%	100.00%	100.00%

=== 2000 census ===
As of the census of 2000, there were 78 people, 30 households, and 24 families residing in the CDP. The population density was 221.0 inhabitants per square mile (85.3/km^{2}). There were 33 housing units at an average density of 93.5 per square mile (36.1/km^{2}). The racial makeup of the CDP was 79.49% White, 19.23% from other races, and 1.28% from two or more races. Hispanic or Latino of any race were 84.62% of the population.

There were 30 households, out of which 33.3% had children under the age of 18 living with them, 60.0% were married couples living together, 20.0% had a female householder with no husband present, and 20.0% were non-families. 20.0% of all households were made up of individuals, and 13.3% had someone living alone who was 65 years of age or older. The average household size was 2.60 and the average family size was 2.96.

In the CDP, the population was spread out, with 24.4% under the age of 18, 6.4% from 18 to 24, 28.2% from 25 to 44, 28.2% from 45 to 64, and 12.8% who were 65 years of age or older. The median age was 36 years. For every 100 females, there were 95.0 males. For every 100 females age 18 and over, there were 78.8 males.

The median income for a household in the CDP was $23,482, and the median income for a family was $24,286. Males had a median income of $48,750 versus $13,750 for females. The per capita income for the CDP was $14,438. There were 30.8% of families and 35.4% of the population living below the poverty line, including 83.3% of under eighteens and none of those over 64.

== Education ==
Santa Monica is served by the Lyford Consolidated Independent School District.

In addition, South Texas Independent School District operates magnet schools that serve the community.
