= San Perlita Independent School District =

School district in Texas, United States

Address
- 22987 Trojan Drive San Perlita, Texas, 78590; United States

District information
- Grades: PK–12
- Schools: 3
- NCES District ID: 4839000

Students and staff
- Students: 187 (2024–2025)
- Teachers: 22.11 (on an FTE basis)
- Student–teacher ratio: 8.46:1

Other information
- Website: www.spisd.org

San Perlita Independent School District is a public school district based in San Perlita, Texas, United States.

In addition to San Perlita, the district also serves the community of Port Mansfield.

San Perlita ISD has three campuses - San Perlita High (Grades 9-12), San Perlita Middle (Grades 6-8), and San Perlita Elementary (Grades PK-5).

In 2009, the school district was rated "recognized" by the Texas Education Agency.

San Perlita Tx 5A football team made history in 2026 going 10-0 in District. Lead towards a National title for 2 years in a row.
