= Lyford Consolidated Independent School District =

School district in Texas, United States

Address
- 8240 Simon Gomez Boulevard Lyford, Texas, 78569; United States

District information
- Grades: PK–12
- Schools: 3
- NCES District ID: 4828620

Students and staff
- Students: 1,396 (2024–2025)
- Teachers: 92.71 (on an FTE basis)
- Student–teacher ratio: 15.06:1

Other information
- Website: www.lyfordcisd.net

Lyford Consolidated Independent School District (LCISD) is a school district headquartered in Lyford, Texas, United States.

LCISD serves the city of Lyford and unincorporated areas in Willacy County, Cameron County, and Hidalgo County. Census-designated places in Willacy County served by LCISD include Santa Monica, Sebastian, and Zapata Ranch. Former CDPs in Willacy County within LCISD include Lyford South and Willamar. CDPs in Cameron County served by LCISD include the majority of Yznaga.

In the fall of 1999, LCISD opened a new 42,000-square-foot (3,900 m^{2}) middle school, replacing a 12,000-square-foot (1,100 m^{2}) middle school.

In 2009, the school district was rated "academically acceptable" by the Texas Education Agency.

== History ==
Previously LCISD took high school students from the Lasara Independent School District. Lasara ISD eventually received a high school, with 2011 being the year of the first graduation.

== Mascot ==
Bulldogs

== UIL Classification ==
3A

== Schools ==
- Lyford High School
- Lyford Middle School
- Lyford Elementary School
