= Raymondville Independent School District =

School district in Texas, United States

Address
- 419 FM 3168 Raymondville, Texas, 78580; United States

District information
- Grades: PK–12
- Schools: 5
- NCES District ID: 4836540

Students and staff
- Students: 1,963 (2024–2025)
- Teachers: 143.21 (on an FTE basis)
- Student–teacher ratio: 13.71:1

Other information
- Website: www.raymondvilleisd.org

Raymondville Independent School District is a public school district based in Raymondville, Texas, United States.

In addition to Raymondville, the district serves the census-designated places of Ranchette Estates and Los Angeles Subdivision.

In 2009, the school district was rated "academically acceptable" by the Texas Education Agency.

In 2026, 97.6% of the population enrolled at RISD was Hispanic. They had a teacher to student ratio of 14 to 1. 56% of high school students tested at or above the proficient level for reading, and 64% tested at or above that level for math. In middle school, 54% were at or above proficient, and 49% were at or above for math.

== History ==
Previously RISD took high school students from the Lasara Independent School District. Lasara ISD eventually received a high school, with 2011 being the year of the first graduation.

In 2026, RISD was rated "#12 in Best School Districts in Brownsville Area"

== Marching Band ==
In 2025, the Bearcat marching band won the 2025 Sudler Shield award. The Sudler Shield is an award given to high school bands by the John Philip Sousa Foundation.

== Schools ==
- Raymondville Early College High School
- Myra Green Middle School
- Pittman Elementary
- L. C. Smith Elementary
- Raymondville Options Academic Academy

== See also ==
- Castañeda v. Pickard
