= Corpus Christi–Kingsville–Alice combined statistical area =

The Corpus Christi–Kingsville–Alice combined statistical area is made up of six counties in South Texas. The statistical area consists of the Corpus Christi Metropolitan Statistical Area, the Kingsville Micropolitan Statistical Area, and the Alice Micropolitan Statistical Area. As of the 2010 census, the CSA had a population of 501,500 (though a July 1, 2013 estimate placed the population at 516,793).

== Counties ==
- Aransas
- Brooks
- Kleberg
- Nueces
- San Patricio
- Jim Wells

== Communities ==
=== Places with more than 200,000 people ===
- Corpus Christi (Principal City)

=== Places with 10,000 to 30,000 people ===
- Kingsville (Principal City)
- Alice (Principal City)
- Portland
- Robstown
- Rockport

=== Places with 1,000 to 10,000 people ===
- Aransas Pass
- Bishop
- Fulton
- Gregory
- Ingleside
- Mathis
- Odem
- Port Aransas
- Sinton
- Taft Southwest
- Taft
- San Diego
- Premont
- Orange Grove

=== Places with 500 to 1,000 people ===
- Del Sol-Loma Linda
- Driscoll
- Ingleside on the Bay
- Lake City
- Lakeshore Gardens-Hidden Acres
- North San Pedro
- Petronila
- St. Paul
- Spring Garden-Terra Verde

=== Places with less than 500 people ===
- Agua Dulce
- Doyle
- Edgewater-Paisano
- Edroy
- Falman-County Acres
- La Paloma-Lost Creek
- Lakeside
- Morgan Farm Area
- Rancho Banquete
- Rancho Chico
- San Patricio
- Sandy Hollow-Escondidas
- Tierra Grande
- Tradewinds
- Pernitas Point
- Ben Bolt

=== Unincorporated places ===
- Riviera
- Sarita
- Alfred-South La Paloma
- Alfred
- Alice Acres
- Ben Bolt
- Bentonville
- Casa Blanca
- Coyote Acres
- K-Bar Ranch
- La Gloria
- Loma Linda East
- Owl Ranch-Amargosa
- Palito Blanco
- Rancho Alegre
- Rancho de la Parita
- Sandia
- Springfield
- Westdale
- San Federico de la Corrazo

== See also ==
- List of cities in Texas
- Texas census statistical areas
- List of Texas metropolitan areas
