= Alice micropolitan area =

The Alice micropolitan statistical area is in Jim Wells County, Texas. It principal city is Alice, 44 miles from Corpus Christi, Texas, the closest metropolitan statistical area. The closest Micropolitan Statistical Area is 39 miles in Beeville.

== Population Over 10,000 ==
- Alice, Texas (the principal city)

== Population Between 5,000 and 10,000 ==
- San Diego, Texas (partial)

== Populations Between 1,000 and 5,000 ==
- Orange Grove, Texas
- Premont, Texas
- Rancho Alegre, Texas

== Population Under 1,000 ==
- Alfred-South La Paloma, Texas
- Alice Acres, Texas
- Coyote Acres, Texas
- K-Bar Ranch, Texas
- Loma Linda East, Texas
- Owl Ranch-Amargosa, Texas
- Pernitas Point, Texas (mostly)
- Sandia, Texas
- Westdale, Texas

== Unincorporated communities ==
- Alfred, Texas
- Ben Bolt, Texas
- Bentonville, Texas
- Casa Blanca, Texas
- La Gloria, Texas
- Palito Blanco, Texas
- Rancho de la Parita, Texas
- Springfield, Texas
