= Skidmore-Tynan Independent School District =

School district in Texas, United States

Skidmore-Tynan Independent School District (S-TISD) is a school district headquartered in Skidmore, Texas. It includes an elementary school, a junior high school, and Skidmore-Tynan High School.

The district, mostly located in Bee County, includes Skidmore and Tynan. A portion of the district extends into San Patricio County.

== History ==
In 1961 the Texas Education Agency (TEA) sent a observers to the district in 1961 and 1962, then issued a report praising improvements between the two visits.

Brett Belmarez was superintendent from 2003 until 2013, when the board of trustees removed him from his position, with six members voting in favor to remove and one voting against. There was a longstanding dispute between Belmarez and the board of trustees.

In 2017, Randy Hoyer resigned from his position as superintendent so he could work at the Orange Grove Independent School District. That year, Dustin Barton became the superintendent. In the 2018-2019 school year, S-TISD's student enrollment count was 826. In 2020, Barton resigned as he took a new job with the Caddo Mills Independent School District. In 2020, the board of education decided that Richard Waterhouse was the sole candidate under consideration for superintendent, and he started his job on August 19 of that year.
