= K-Bar Ranch, Texas =

- Census-designated place
- Coordinates: 27°59′47″N 97°55′22″W
- Country: United States
- State: Texas
- County: Jim Wells

Area
  - Total: 3.37 sq mi (8.72 km^{2})
  - Land: 3.37 sq mi (8.72 km^{2})
  - Water: 0 sq mi (0.0 km^{2})
- Elevation: 194 ft (59 m)

Population (2020)
  - Total: 375
  - Density: 111/sq mi (43.0/km^{2})
- Time zone: UTC-6 (Central (CST))
  - Summer (DST): UTC-5 (CDT)
- FIPS code: 48-38518
- GNIS feature ID: 1852716

K-Bar Ranch is a census-designated place (CDP) in Jim Wells County, Texas, United States. The population was 375 at the 2020 census.

== Geography ==
K-Bar Ranch is located in northeastern Jim Wells County at 27°59′47″N 97°55′22″W (27.996465, -97.922898). Texas State Highway 359 forms the southeastern border of the community. Highway 359 leads southwest 2 miles (3 km) to Orange Grove and 20 miles (32 km) to Alice, the county seat, as well as northeast 10 miles (16 km) to Mathis.

According to the United States Census Bureau, the CDP has a total area of 3.4 square miles (8.7 km^{2}), all land.

== Demographics ==
Historical population
Census	Pop.	Note	%±
2000	350		—
2010	358		2.3%
2020	375		4.7%
U.S. Decennial Census; 1850–1900 1910; 1920 1930 1940; 1950 1960 1970; 1980 1990 2000; 2010 2020

K-Bar Ranch first appeared as a census designated place in the 2000 U.S. census.

=== 2020 census ===
K-Bar Ranch CDP, Texas – Racial and ethnic composition Note: the US Census treats Hispanic/Latino as an ethnic category. This table excludes Latinos from the racial categories and assigns them to a separate category. Hispanics/Latinos may be of any race.
Race / Ethnicity (NH = Non-Hispanic)	Pop 2000	Pop 2010	Pop 2020	% 2000	% 2010	% 2020
White alone (NH)	57	98	85	16.29%	27.37%	22.67%
Black or African American alone (NH)	0	0	0	0.00%	0.00%	0.00%
Native American or Alaska Native alone (NH)	1	2	0	0.29%	0.56%	0.00%
Asian alone (NH)	0	1	0	0.00%	0.28%	0.00%
Native Hawaiian or Pacific Islander alone (NH)	0	0	0	0.00%	0.00%	0.00%
Other race alone (NH)	0	0	0	0.00%	0.00%	0.00%
Mixed race or Multiracial (NH)	0	1	2	0.00%	0.28%	0.53%
Hispanic or Latino (any race)	292	256	288	83.43%	71.51%	76.80%
Total	350	358	375	100.00%	100.00%	100.00%

=== 2000 census ===
As of the census of 2000, there were 350 people, 99 households, and 89 families residing in the CDP. The population density was 102.6 inhabitants per square mile (39.6/km^{2}). There were 116 housing units at an average density of 34.0 per square mile (13.1/km^{2}). The racial makeup of the CDP was 86.29% White, 0.29% Native American, 12.86% from other races, and 0.57% from two or more races. Hispanic or Latino of any race were 83.43% of the population.

There were 99 households, out of which 55.6% had children under the age of 18 living with them, 70.7% were married couples living together, 13.1% had a female householder with no husband present, and 9.1% were non-families. 6.1% of all households were made up of individuals, and 4.0% had someone living alone who was 65 years of age or older. The average household size was 3.54 and the average family size was 3.69.

In the CDP, the population was spread out, with 38.6% under the age of 18, 7.7% from 18 to 24, 26.6% from 25 to 44, 17.4% from 45 to 64, and 9.7% who were 65 years of age or older. The median age was 28 years. For every 100 females, there were 92.3 males. For every 100 females age 18 and over, there were 92.0 males.

The median income for a household in the CDP was $29,205, and the median income for a family was $28,409. Males had a median income of $23,173 versus $23,750 for females. The per capita income for the CDP was $7,450. About 26.2% of families and 34.3% of the population were below the poverty line, including 43.9% of those under age 18 and none of those age 65 or over.

== Education ==
K-Bar Ranch is served by the Orange Grove Independent School District.
