= South La Paloma, Texas =

- Census-designated place
- Location within Texas Location within the United States
- Coordinates: 27°53′41″N 97°58′07″W
- Country: United States
- State: Texas
- County: Jim Wells

Area
  - Total: 1.452 sq mi (3.76 km^{2})
  - Land: 1.452 sq mi (3.76 km^{2})
  - Water: 0 sq mi (0 km^{2})
- Elevation: 154 ft (47 m)

Population (2020)
  - Total: 347
  - Density: 239/sq mi (92.3/km^{2})
- Time zone: UTC-6 (Central (CST))
  - Summer (DST): UTC-5 (CDT)
- Area code: 361
- GNIS feature ID: 2584740

South La Paloma is an unincorporated community and census-designated place in Jim Wells County, Texas, United States. As of the 2020 census, South La Paloma had a population of 347. Prior to 2010, the community was grouped with nearby Alfred as part of the Alfred-South La Paloma census-designated place.

== Geography ==
According to the U.S. Census Bureau, the community has an area of 1.452 square miles (3.76 km^{2}), all land.

== Demographics ==
Historical population
Census	Pop.	Note	%±
2010	345		—
2020	347		0.6%
U.S. Decennial Census; 1850–1900 1910; 1920 1930 1940; 1950 1960 1970; 1980 1990 2000; 2010 2020

South La Paloma first appeared as census designated place in the 2010 U.S. census formed from part of the deleted Alfred-South La Paloma CDP.

=== 2020 census ===
South La Paloma CDP, Texas – Racial and ethnic composition Note: the US Census treats Hispanic/Latino as an ethnic category. This table excludes Latinos from the racial categories and assigns them to a separate category. Hispanics/Latinos may be of any race.
Race / Ethnicity (NH = Non-Hispanic)	Pop 2010	Pop 2020	% 2010	% 2020
White alone (NH)	160	116	46.38%	33.43%
Black or African American alone (NH)	0	0	0.00%	0.00%
Native American or Alaska Native alone (NH)	0	4	0.00%	1.15%
Asian alone (NH)	0	0	0.00%	0.00%
Native Hawaiian or Pacific Islander alone (NH)	0	0	0.00%	0.00%
Other Race alone (NH)	0	3	0.00%	0.86%
Mixed Race or Multi-Racial (NH)	1	5	0.29%	1.44%
Hispanic or Latino (any race)	184	219	53.33%	63.11%
Total	345	347	100.00%	100.00%

== Education ==
South La Paloma is in the Orange Grove Independent School District.
