= Texas State Highway 44 =

State highway in Texas

State Highway 44

Route information
- Maintained by TxDOT
- Length: 128.853 mi (Note: The certified mileage given is shorter than the actual mileage as TxDOT considers SH 44 to be discontinuous at rather than concurrent with US 59.) (207.369 km)
- Existed: April 24, 1919–present

Major junctions
- West end: US 83 near Encinal
- I-35 in Encinal Future I-69W / US 59 near Freer Future I-69C / US 281 near Alice; I-69E / US 77 in Robstown
- East end: SH 358 in Corpus Christi

Location
- Country: United States
- State: Texas

Highway system
- Highways in Texas; Interstate; US; State; Former; Toll; Loops; Spurs; FM/RM; Park; Rec
← I-44	→ I-45
← FM 862	FM 863	→ RM 864

State Highway 44 (SH 44) is a Texas state highway that runs from west of Encinal to Corpus Christi, Texas. This highway is also known as the Cesar Chavez Memorial Highway outside the city limits of Robstown, Banquete, Agua Dulce, Alice, and Corpus Christi in Nueces and Jim Wells counties.

== History ==
Historic SH 44

SH 44 was originally proposed on April 24, 1919 as a connector route between Waco and Giddings. On July 16, 1923, the southern terminus extended south to La Grange. By 1926, construction was continuing on the highway, and SH 44 was concurrent with U.S. Highway 77 (US 77). On July 15, 1935, SH 21 was rerouted concurrent with SH 44 from north of Giddings to Giddings. On November 24, 1936, this route had extended south to Hallettsville and another section from Victoria south via Sinton and Robstown to Alice was designated, creating a gap and replacing part of SH 72 and all of SH 128 (which was reassigned to the portion of SH 72 that was disconnected due to SH 44). On April 19, 1938, the section of SH 44 from SH 21 north of Giddings to Giddings was no longer concurrent with SH 21, because SH 21 was rerouted west of Lincoln. On July 15, 1938, the section from Hallettsville to Victoria (already under construction as a lateral road) was added, closing the gap. On September 26, 1939, the section north of Hallettsville was already part of US 77, the section from there to Victoria was changed to SH 295, the section from Victoria to Sinton was already part of US 77, and the section from Sinton to Robstown was reassigned as an extension of SH 96. The eastern terminus was shifted to Corpus Christi over part of SH 16. The western terminus was then extended to Freer on July 1, 1940. The section west of Freer approximately 56.4 miles (90.8 km) was Farm to Market Road 863 (FM 863) which traveled west to US 83 in Webb County, today's SH 44 terminus.

On November 21, 1917, an intercounty highway was designated from Taylor to Hearne. A spur, SH 44A, was designated on July 20, 1920 along part of the intercounty highway from Taylor to Milano. On January 18, 1921, SH 44A became part of an extended SH 43A.

From 1948 to 1953, FM 863 went from Beaver Creek to the town of Hilda which became RM 648 and is now RM 783. FM 863 was designated over a new route and part of FM 133 from Encinal to Freer in 1953. Before 1955, FM 863 ended at the Webb–LaSalle county line. On January 22, 1958, FM 863 began to be signed, but not designated, as SH 44. On August 29, 1990, FM 863 was officially designated as SH 44, and FM 863 was cancelled.

== Future ==
TxDOT has officially designated the SH 44 corridor from Freer to Corpus Christi as part of the I-69 system in Texas. This started as a bill, which was named H.R. 4523 or 44 to 69 Act of 2014, that was submitted by House Representative Blake Farenthold to Congress to approve turning SH 44 into an Interstate Highway from Freer (where it will intersect I-69W) and Corpus Christi (about 73 miles (117 km)) in order to have a network of interstate highways connecting Laredo (the largest inland port on the United States–Mexican border) with Corpus Christi (a major seaport and manufacturing center). In Corpus Christi, SH 44 is already at interstate highway standard, and it is a four-lane divided highway westward to the city of San Diego, Texas. The 23 miles (37 km) from San Diego to Freer is a two-lane section. Following a study and a January 18, 2018 open house, SH 44 between FM 3386 to east of FM 1694 in Violet in Nueces County was also upgraded between 2018-2022. A study regarding SH 44 upgrades in Robstown is ongoing as well.

== Major intersections ==
County	Location	mi	km	Destinations	Notes
Webb		0.0	0.0	US 83 – Laredo, Carrizo Springs	Western terminus
La Salle	Encinal	11.9	19.2	I-35 BL south (Main Street) to I-35 south – Encinal, Laredo	West end of I-35 Bus. overlap
La Salle	Encinal	12.1	19.5	I-35 / I-35 BL ends – Cotulla, San Antonio, Laredo	East end of I-35 Bus. overlap; I-35 exit 39
Duval		56.2	90.4	Future I-69W south / US 59 south – Laredo	West end of Future I-69W/US 59 overlap.
Duval	Freer	59.2	95.3	SH 16 – Tilden, Hebbronville, Falfurrias	
Duval		60.6	97.5	Future I-69W north / US 59 north – George West, Houston	East end of Future I-69W/US 59 overlap.
Duval		72.4	116.5	FM 3196 south / County Road 330 – Los Reyes, La Rosita, Benavides	
Duval	San Diego	84.1	135.3	SH 359 west – Hebbronville	West end of SH 359 overlap
Jim Wells		86.9	139.9	FM 625 east	
Jim Wells		91.3	146.9	FM 2507 south	
Jim Wells		92.0	148.1	Future I-69C / US 281 – George West, Premont, Falfurrias	Interchange (U.S. 281 is the future Interstate 69C)
Jim Wells	Alice	93.1	149.8	FM 1554 south (Beam Station Road)	
Jim Wells	Alice	93.4	150.3	Bus. US 281 – Falfurrias, George West	Interchange
Jim Wells	Alice	94.6	152.2	FM 665 east (Cameron Street)	
Jim Wells	Alice	96.2	154.8	FM 1931 north (Flournoy Road) – Airport	
Jim Wells		98.5	158.5	SH 359 east – Orange Grove, Mathis	Interchange; East end of SH 359 overlap
Jim Wells		102.6	165.1	FM 2044 west	
Nueces	Agua Dulce	105.7	170.1	FM 70 – Sandia, Bishop	
Nueces	Banquete	112.1	180.4	FM 666 – Mathis, Driscoll	
Nueces	Robstown	119.5	192.3	Bus. SH 44 east (Western Avenue)	
Nueces	Robstown	120.4	193.8	FM 1889 north (1st Street)	
Nueces	Robstown	120.9	194.6	Bus. US 77 north (via Avenue J) – Victoria	interchange
Nueces	Robstown	121.4	195.4	I-69E / US 77 – Kingsville	interchange
Nueces	Robstown	121.8	196.0	Bus. SH 44 west (East Avenue A)	
Nueces	Robstown	121.9	196.2	I-69E south / US 77 south	interchange
Nueces		123.4	198.6	FM 1694 (Callicoatte Road)	Interchange; west end of freeway
Nueces	Violet	125.1	201.3	FM 24 (Violet Road) / CO Road 61	
Nueces		127.0	204.4	FM 3386 (McKinzie Road)	
Nueces		127.1	204.5	Agnes Street	direct eastbound exit only
Nueces	Corpus Christi	127.3	204.9	FM 2292 (Clarkwood Road)	
Nueces	Corpus Christi	129.7	208.7	Bus. SH 44 west (Agnes Street)	direct westbound exit only
Nueces	Corpus Christi	131.0	210.8	Corpus Christi International Airport	
Nueces	Corpus Christi	131.9	212.3	Hopkins Road	direct westbound exit only
Nueces	Corpus Christi	131.9	212.3	Talbert Road	no direct westbound exit (signed at Heinsohn Road)
Nueces	Corpus Christi	132.1	212.6	Agnes Street	direct eastbound exit only
Nueces	Corpus Christi	132.7	213.6	Heinsohn Road	
Nueces	Corpus Christi	133.3	214.5	SH 358 to I-37 – Bayfront, NAS, CCAD, Padre Island	Eastern terminus
1.000 mi = 1.609 km; 1.000 km = 0.621 mi: Concurrency terminus; Incomplete access

== Business routes ==
SH 44 has two business routes.

=== Robstown business loop ===
Business State Highway 44
- Location: Robstown
- Length: 1.72 mi (2.77 km)
- Existed: June 21, 1990–present

Business State Highway 44-C (formerly Loop 296) is a 1.72-mile (2.77 km) state highway business loop that runs on the former routing of SH 44 through Robstown. The road was bypassed on January 19, 1956 by SH 44 and designated Loop 296. Loop 296 was designated as Business SH 44-C on June 21, 1990. On July 31, 2003 the road was rerouted on a new route to US 77 and the original section was returned to local jurisdiction.

=== Corpus Christi bypass ===
Business State Highway 44
- Location: Corpus Christi
- Length: 1.89 mi (3.04 km)
- Existed: October 26, 2006–present

Business State Highway 44-D is a bypass of SH 44 in Corpus Christi. The route was created in 2006.

=== Former Corpus Christi business loop ===
Business State Highway 44
- Location: Corpus Christi
- Length: 5.8 mi (9.3 km)
- Existed: June 21, 1990–June 18, 1996

Business State Highway 44-D (formerly Loop 443) was a business loop that ran on the former routing of SH 44 through Corpus Christi. The road was bypassed on October 3, 1966 by SH 44 and designated Loop 443. Loop 443 was designated as Business SH 44-D on June 21, 1990, but much of the route was redesignated as Spur 544 on June 18, 1996 and a small section was returned to local jurisdiction.
