= National Register of Historic Places listings in Jim Wells County, Texas =

Location of Jim Wells County in Texas

This is a list of the National Register of Historic Places listings in Jim Wells County, Texas.

This is intended to be a complete list of properties listed on the National Register of Historic Places in Jim Wells County, Texas. There is one property listed on the National Register in the county.

This National Park Service list is complete through NPS recent listings posted March 21, 2025.

== Current listings ==
The publicly disclosed locations of National Register properties may be seen in a mapping service provided.

	Name on the Register	Image	Date listed	Location	City or town	Description
1	Hinojosa Site	Hinojosa Site	March 30, 1978 (#78002965)	Address restricted	Alice	

== See also ==
- National Register of Historic Places listings in Texas
- Recorded Texas Historic Landmarks in Jim Wells County
