= Texas State Highway 359 =

State highway in Texas

State Highway 359
- SH 359, highlighted in red

Route information
- Maintained by TxDOT
- Length: 135.233 mi (217.636 km)
- Existed: 1954–present

Major junctions
- West end: US 83 at Laredo
- I-37 at Mathis
- East end: US 181 at Skidmore

Location
- Country: United States
- State: Texas

Highway system
- Highways in Texas; Interstate; US; State; Former; Toll; Loops; Spurs; FM/RM; Park; Rec
← SH 358	→ SH 360

State Highway 359 (SH 359) is a state highway that runs from Skidmore in southeastern Texas, near Corpus Christi, southwest and west to Laredo at the international border with Mexico.

== History ==
The 359 route designation was first used on May 15, 1946, for a short stretch of highway in Coleman from US 84 west to Commercial Avenue and south along Commercial Avenue to US 67 (now SH 206), with a spur northward along Commercial Avenue to Coleman, but this designation was cancelled and replaced with Texas State Highway Loop 175 on June 17, 1947. The current State Highway 359 was designated on August 24, 1954, along the old US 59 route from Beeville to Laredo. SH 359 covered essentially its present-day route, plus a co-routing with US 181 from Skidmore to Beeville. On January 22, 1958, SH 359 was rerouted on Front Street rather than Main Street in Alice. On August 23, 1960, the dual designation with US 181 from Skidmore to Beeville was removed, which made Skidmore the eastern terminus of SH 359.

== Route description ==
The highway's eastern terminus is the intersection with US 181 at Skidmore. The route runs southwest through Tynan to an intersection with Interstate 37 at Mathis. The route continues in a southwest direction past Lake Corpus Christi through Sandia, Orange Grove and Alfred until it reaches Alice, where it is briefly co-routed with SH 44.

The route then diverges from SH 44 at San Diego and continues southwest through Benavides and Realitos to a junction with SH 16 at Hebbronville. Here the route takes a more western direction and runs through Bruni and Oilton before its final junction with US 83 at Laredo on the Mexican border. Counties traversed by the route include Bee, San Patricio, Jim Wells, Duval, Jim Hogg and Webb. The highway is paved throughout and multi-lane for portions of the route. With the exception of its western terminus at Laredo, most of the terrain covered by the highway is sparsely populated and rural.

== Business routes ==
SH 359 has one business route.

=== Mathis business loop ===
Business State Highway 359-B
- Location: Mathis
- Existed: 1990–present

Business State Highway 359-B (Bus. SH 359-B), formerly Loop 198, is a business loop in Mathis. The route was bypassed in 1947 by US 59 and SH 9 and redesignated Loop 198. Loop 198 was redesignated as Business SH 359-B on June 21, 1990.

== Major intersections ==
County	Location	mi	km	Destinations	Notes
Webb	Laredo			Houston Street (I-35 Bus. south) / Santa Ursula Avenue - International Bridge No. 1, International Bridge No. 2	
Webb	Laredo			I-35 north / US 83 north (San Dario Avenue) to I-69W / US 59 – San Antonio, Houston, Carrizo Springs	
Webb	Laredo			US 83 south / Arkansas Avenue – Zapata	Interchange; east end of US 83 overlap
Webb	Laredo			Loop 20 (Bob Bullock Loop) / Spur 260 south (Jaime Zapata Memorial Highway) – Zapata, Texas A&M International University, Lake Casa Blanca International State Park, Laredo Entertainment Center	Interchange
Webb				FM 2895 north – Aguilares	
Webb				FM 649 south – Mirando City	
Webb	Bruni			FM 2050 north – Freer	
Duval	No major junctions				
Jim Hogg	Hebbronville			SH 16 north (Smith Street) – Freer	West end of SH 16 overlap
Jim Hogg	Hebbronville			SH 16 south / SH 285 east (Smith Street) to FM 1017 – Falfurrias, Zapata	East end of SH 16 overlap
Duval	Realitos			FM 716 east (Corkill Street) – Concepcion	
Duval	Benavides			FM 2295 west to SH 16	West end of FM 2295 overlap
Duval	Benavides			SH 339 north (Texas Boulevard) – Freer	West end of SH 339 overlap
Duval	Benavides			SH 339 south / FM 3196 north (Humble Street) – La Rosita, Falfurrias	East end of SH 339 overlap
Duval	Benavides			FM 2295 east – Kingsville	East end of FM 2295 overlap
Duval	San Diego			FM 1329 south – Falfurrias	
Duval	San Diego			SH 44 west – Freer, Laredo	West end of SH 44 overlap
see SH 44
Jim Wells				SH 44 east – Agua Dulce, Corpus Christi	Interchange; east end of SH 44 overlap
Jim Wells				FM 3376 west	
Jim Wells				FM 1539 east	
Jim Wells				FM 2044	
Jim Wells	Orange Grove			FM 624 – Corpus Christi	
Jim Wells	Casa Blanca			FM 534 north	
Jim Wells	Sandia			FM 70 south	
Jim Wells	Sandia			FM 1540 east	
San Patricio				PR 25 north – Lake Corpus Christi State Recreational Area	
San Patricio	Mathis			Bus. SH 359 east / FM 666 south (San Patricio Street) – San Patricio	
San Patricio	Mathis			Spur 459 east to I-37 south – Corpus Christi	
San Patricio	Mathis			Bus. SH 359 west	
San Patricio	Mathis			FM 3024 north	
San Patricio	Mathis			I-37 – San Antonio, Corpus Christi	I-37 exit 36
Bee	Tynan			FM 796 south	West end of FM 796 overlap
Bee	Tynan			FM 796 north	East end of FM 796 overlap
Bee	Skidmore			US 181 – Skidmore, Sinton	
1.000 mi = 1.609 km; 1.000 km = 0.621 mi
