= Area code 361 =

Area code in Texas, United States

Numbering plan areas and area codes of Texas with numbering plan area 361 highlighted.

North American area code 361 is a state of Texas telephone area code for numbers in the Corpus Christi area, the Coastal Bend and the Victoria Crossroads. It was created prior to February 13, 1999, in a split from area code 512.

Counties served by this area code:

Aransas, Bee, Brooks, Calhoun, DeWitt, Duval, Fayette, Goliad, Jackson, Jim Hogg, Jim Wells, Kenedy, Kleberg, Lavaca, Live Oak, Matagorda, McMullen County, Nueces, Refugio, San Patricio, Victoria, and Webb

Towns and cities served by this area code:

Agua Dulce, Alfred, Alice, Aransas Pass, Armstrong, Austwell, Banquete, Bayside, Beeville, Ben Bolt, Benavides, Bentonville, Berclair, Bishop, Blessing, Bloomington, Bruni, Calliham, Casa Blanca, Chapman Ranch, Collegeport, Concepcion, Corpus Christi, Cuero, Dinero, Driscoll, Edna, Edroy, Elmaton, Encino, Falfurrias, Fannin, Flatonia, Francitas, Freer, Fulton, Ganado, George West, Goliad, Gregory, Hallettsville, Hebbronville, Hochheim, Inez, Ingleside, Ingleside on the Bay, Kingsville, La Salle, La Ward, Lolita, Mathis, Mcfaddin, Meyersville, Midfield, Mineral, Mirando City, Moulton, Nordheim, Normanna, Nursery, Oakville, Odem, Oilton, Orange Grove, Palacios, Palito Blanco, Pawnee, Pernitas Point, Pettus, Placedo, Point Comfort, Port Aransas, Port Lavaca, Port O'Connor, Portland, Premont, Rancho Alegre, Rancho de la Parita, Realitos, Refugio, Riviera, Robstown, Rockport, San Diego, Sandia, Sarita, Seadrift, Shiner, Sinton, Skidmore, Springfield, Sublime, Sweet Home, Taft, Telferner, Thomaston, Three Rivers, Tilden, Tivoli, Tuleta, Tynan, Vanderbilt, Victoria, Weesatche, Woodsboro, Yoakum, and Yorktown

== Ten-digit dialing ==
Prior to October 2021, area code 361 had telephone numbers assigned for the central office code 988. In 2020, 988 was designated nationwide as a dialing code for the National Suicide Prevention Lifeline, which created a conflict for exchanges that permit seven-digit dialing. This area code was therefore scheduled to transition to ten-digit dialing by October 24, 2021.

== See also ==
- List of Texas area codes

Texas area codes: 210/726, 214/469/972/945, 254, 325, 361, 409, 432, 512/737, 713/281/832/346, 806, 817/682, 830, 903/430, 915, 936, 940, 956, 979
	North: 512/737, 830	
West: 830, 956	area code 361	East: Gulf of Mexico, 979
	South: 956	
