= Naval Auxiliary Landing Field Orange Grove =

Military airport in Jim Wells County, Texas, US

Coordinates: 27°54′04″N 098°03′06″W

NALF Orange Grove
- IATA: none; ICAO: KNOG; FAA LID: NOG

Summary
- Airport type: Military
- Owner: United States Navy
- Location: Jim Wells County, near Orange Grove, Texas
- Elevation AMSL: 257 ft / 78 m

Map

Runways
Direction	Length		Surface
Direction	ft	m	Surface
1/19	8,000	2,438	PEM
13/31	8,000	2,438	PEM
- Source: Federal Aviation Administration

Naval Auxiliary Landing Field Orange Grove or NALF Orange Grove (ICAO: KNOG, FAA LID: NOG) is a military airport located southwest of Orange Grove, a city in Jim Wells County, Texas, United States. It was commissioned in 1951, and covers an area of 1,373 acres (5.56 km^{2}). Owned by the United States Navy, it supports pilot training for NAS Kingsville. It has two runways, 1/19 and 13/31, each measuring 8,000 x 200 ft (2,438 x 61 m).

Although most U.S. airports use the same three-letter location identifier for the FAA and IATA, NALF Orange Grove is assigned NOG by the FAA but has no designation from the IATA (which assigned NOG to Nogales International Airport in Nogales, Sonora, Mexico
