= Hinojosa Site =

- U.S. National Register of Historic Places
- Nearest city: Alice, Texas
- Area: 3 acres (1.2 ha)
- NRHP reference No.: 78002965
- Added to NRHP: March 30, 1978

The Hinojosa Site in Jim Wells County, Texas, in the vicinity of Alice, Texas, is an archeological site which was listed on the National Register of Historic Places in 1978. It was listed for its potential to yield information in the future.

It is a village site which is also denoted as site 41-JW-8. Its location is Address restricted.

It is a site of the Toyah culture.

== See also ==
- National Register of Historic Places listings in Texas
