= Skidmore-Tynan High School =

Location
- 213 West Walton Street; Skidmore, Bee County, Texas 78389-0409; United States; 28.255974°N 97.692173°W

Information
- School type: Public, high school
- Locale: Rural: Distant
- School district: Skidmore-Tynan ISD
- NCES School ID: 484041004576
- Principal: Stella Resio
- Staff: 25.45 (on an FTE basis)
- Grades: 9–12
- Enrollment: 230 (2023–2024)
- Student to teacher ratio: 9.04
- Colors: Purple and gold
- Athletics conference: UIL Class 2A
- Mascot: Bobcat
- Website: Skidmore-Tynan High School

Skidmore-Tynan High School is a public high school situated in Skidmore, Texas (USA) and classified as a 3A school by the UIL. It is part of the Skidmore-Tynan Independent School District located in southern Bee County. During 2023–2024, Skidmore-Tynan High School had an enrollment of 230 students and a student to teacher ratio of 9.04. The school received an overall rating of "A" from the Texas Education Agency for the 2024–2025 school year.

== History ==
A high school facility opened in 1953. In 2022, the district announced that a replacement high school facility was being built. Construction began in March of that year. In March 2023 the district stated that there were not enough building materials to complete the facility in time for the 2023-2024 school year's start. The current building opened in January 2024.

== Athletics ==
The Skidmore-Tynan Bobcats compete in the following sports:

- Baseball
- Basketball
- Cross country
- Football
- Golf
- Powerlifting
- Softball
- Tennis
- Track and field
- Volleyball

S-T also participates in powerlifting through the Texas High School Powerlifting Association.

STHS is also one of many high schools in the area that offers dual-credit classes in conjunction with Coastal Bend College.
