= Tynan, Texas =

- Census-designated place
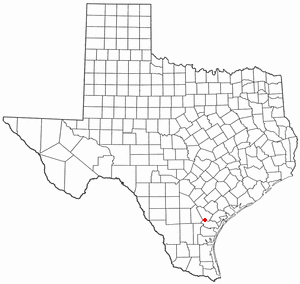
- Location of Tynan, Texas

- Coordinates: 28°10′10″N 97°45′29″W
- Country: United States
- State: Texas
- County: Bee

Area
  - Total: 3.5 sq mi (9.0 km^{2})
  - Land: 3.5 sq mi (9.0 km^{2})
  - Water: 0 sq mi (0.0 km^{2})
- Elevation: 167 ft (51 m)

Population (2020)
  - Total: 254
  - Density: 73/sq mi (28/km^{2})
- Time zone: UTC-6 (Central (CST))
  - Summer (DST): UTC-5 (CDT)
- ZIP code: 78391
- Area code: 361
- FIPS code: 48-74168
- GNIS feature ID: 1349008

Tynan is a census-designated place (CDP) in Bee County, Texas, United States. The population was 254 at the 2020 census.

== Geography ==
Tynan is located along the southern border of Bee County at 28°10′10″N 97°45′29″W (28.169448, -97.757946). Texas State Highway 359 passes through the community, which leads northeastward 7 miles (11 km) to Skidmore and southwestward 5 miles (8 km) to Interstate 37 on the outskirts of Mathis.

According to the United States Census Bureau, the Tynan CDP has a total area of 3.5 square miles (9.0 km^{2}), all land.

== Demographics ==
Historical population
Census	Pop.	Note	%±
2000	301		—
2010	278		−7.6%
2020	254		−8.6%
U.S. Decennial Census; 1850–1900 1910; 1920 1930 1940; 1950 1960 1970; 1980 1990 2000; 2010 2020

Tynan was first listed as a census designated place in the 2000 U.S. census.

Tynan CDP, Texas – Racial and ethnic composition Note: the US Census treats Hispanic/Latino as an ethnic category. This table excludes Latinos from the racial categories and assigns them to a separate category. Hispanics/Latinos may be of any race.
Race / Ethnicity (NH = Non-Hispanic)	Pop 2000	Pop 2010	Pop 2020	% 2000	% 2010	% 2020
White alone (NH)	63	70	49	20.93%	25.18%	19.29%
Black or African American alone (NH)	0	0	0	0.00%	0.00%	0.00%
Native American or Alaska Native alone (NH)	1	0	0	0.33%	0.00%	0.00%
Asian alone (NH)	0	0	0	0.00%	0.00%	0.00%
Pacific Islander alone (NH)	0	0	0	0.00%	0.00%	0.00%
Other race alone (NH)	0	0	1	0.00%	0.00%	0.39%
Mixed race or Multiracial (NH)	0	0	1	0.00%	0.00%	0.39%
Hispanic or Latino (any race)	237	208	203	78.74%	74.82%	79.92%
Total	301	278	254	100.00%	100.00%	100.00%

=== 2000 ===
As of the census of 2000, there were 301 people, 92 households, and 75 families residing in the CDP. The population density was 87.6 inhabitants per square mile (33.8/km^{2}). There were 109 housing units at an average density of 31.7 per square mile (12.2/km^{2}). The racial makeup of the CDP was 79.73% White, 1.33% African American, 1.66% Native American, 16.28% from other races, and 1.00% from two or more races. Hispanic or Latino of any race were 78.74% of the population.

There were 92 households, out of which 42.4% had children under the age of 18 living with them, 62.0% were married couples living together, 16.3% had a female householder with no husband present, and 17.4% were non-families. 15.2% of all households were made up of individuals, and 8.7% had someone living alone who was 65 years of age or older. The average household size was 3.27 and the average family size was 3.64.

In the CDP, the population was spread out, with 32.9% under the age of 18, 8.3% from 18 to 24, 26.2% from 25 to 44, 21.3% from 45 to 64, and 11.3% who were 65 years of age or older. The median age was 33 years. For every 100 females, there were 107.6 males. For every 100 females age 18 and over, there were 96.1 males.

The median income for a household in the CDP was $11,250, and the median income for a family was $11,786. Males had a median income of $15,833 versus $12,000 for females. The per capita income for the CDP was $5,874. About 43.8% of families and 47.4% of the population were below the poverty line, including 63.1% of those under the age of eighteen and 48.7% of those 65 or over.

== Education ==
Tynan and its neighboring community of Skidmore are served by the Skidmore-Tynan Independent School District.
