= James B. Wells Jr. =

American lawyer

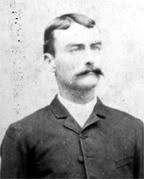
- Born: July 12, 1850; St. Joseph Island, Texas, U.S.
- Died: December 21, 1923 (aged 73); Brownsville, Texas, U.S.
- Occupations: Lawyer, political boss

James Babbage Wells Jr. (July 12, 1850 – December 21, 1923) was an American lawyer, rancher, and Democratic Party boss of South Texas. Wells is remembered for the nearly four decades that he spent as a political kingmaker from his base in Cameron County, Texas, and as the namesake of Jim Wells County, in the same state.

== Biography ==
=== Early years ===
Wells was born July 12, 1850, on St. Joseph Island in Texas, a barrier island on the state's Gulf Coast. He was the son of Lydia Hastings and James B. Wells Sr., both of whom hailed from New England sailing families. The elder James Wells participated in the Texas Revolution of 1835-36 as a privateer, settling on St. Joseph Island after the end of the conflict to raise cattle and operate a merchant ship.

As a boy, James Wells Jr. lived in comparative isolation on St. Joseph Island, where he received most of his education directly from his mother. As he grew older, he began working at the family's ranch and eventually managed the operation.

In 1873, Wells moved to Galveston, where he began to study law under the tutelage of a prominent attorney in that city. He enrolled in the University of Virginia School of Law in 1874 and received his degree the following year.

=== Business career ===
After his graduation from the University of Virginia Law School, Wells returned to his native Texas to open up a legal practice in the Gulf Coast city of Rockport, Texas. He soon moved his practice to Corpus Christi, however, where he gained the attention of Democratic Party political boss Stephen Powers. Powers would take Wells under his wing in 1878 after the death of Powers' junior partner in a duel.

Wells proved to be a very successful local attorney by winning 20 victories in 21 cases during one session of the Cameron County District Court. Wells came to be regarded as Powers' protégé and even married Powers' niece, Pauline Kleiber, on November 4, 1880. Together, the couple had a daughter and three sons, with the oldest boy dying in a shooting accident in 1899.

In addition to his practice of law, Wells was active as a ranch owner, land speculator, and investor in oil exploration and life insurance. He was unable to amass a fortune, however, and was driven to speculative investments, which sometimes failed magnificently and brought him to the brink of bankruptcy on three separate occasions.

Although commonly known as "Judge," Wells was the holder of public office only briefly, as elected City Attorney of Brownsville in the early 1880s and as a gubernatorial appointee in 1897 to finish the term of an elected state district judge, who had been forced to resign.

=== Political career ===
Powers was instrumental in building up an organized Democratic power base in Cameron County, which was dominated during the Reconstruction Era by Republican political appointees of the federal government in Washington, D.C. That took the form of the Blue Club of Cameron County, which gathered together the powerful ranchers of the region to organize voting for unified Democratic tickets. When Powers died in 1882, leadership of the Cameron County Democratic organization fell to Wells, who would remain at the helm of the soon-to-be-dominant political party's patronage machine for the better part of four decades.

By 1890 approximately 97% of the land in Cameron County was controlled by a group of 90 ranchers, who each owned between 1,000 and more than 300,000 acres of tillable soil and rangeland. Each of them controlled the political opinions and votes of a substantial number of their employees, predominately Mexican-Americans, who retained the traditional deferential political attitudes of the patrón-peón relationship. That provided a durable electoral base for Wells and his political allies and enabled them to advance their political agenda of entrenching land ownership rights, maintaining low property taxes, and garnering the intervention of Texas Rangers and federal troops to suppress cattle rustling and civil unrest. He was also a strong supporter of railroad construction in the region, including a bold 1889 project to connect Corpus Christi and Brownsville with the nations of Central America by rail.

From 1895 conservative Democrats firmly dominated Texas politics and Wells forged close ties with the political establishment in Austin as well as local political machines in neighboring counties. This included particularly his cohort Archie Parr of Duval County, with whom he consulted in patronage decisions from the 1890s. Wells held consistently conservative views, including support of the gold standard, and was a political opponent of reform Democratic Governor "Big Jim" Hogg, father of the Texas Railroad Commission.

Wells' recommendations controlled the appointments of Rangers serving in South Texas and his efforts at organizing South Texas legislators for the purpose were important in maintaining a permanent Ranger presence in Brownsville. Wells and his associates turned a blind eye to the abuses of that force, which, together with local vigilante groups, conducted what one historian has called a "reign of terror" which killed at least 200 Mexicans during the bandit raids associated with the revolutionary crisis of 1915.

Wells remained the dominant figure in Cameron County politics and controlled the government agenda and government patronage through the coming of World War I. He would remain as chairman of the Cameron County Democratic Party until 1920.

=== Death and legacy ===
Wells died on December 21, 1923, in Brownsville, Texas.

In the estimation of historian Evan Anders, despite modest corruption in Cameron County, financial gain was only a secondary motive behind Wells' public life:

"Political power itself and the attention that it brought were what mattered to the Brownsville lawyer. In economic terms,... numerous other South Texas entrepreneurs overshadowed James B. Wels. Even as a highly esteemed lawyer, he served as the agent of more successful men. Only as a political leader did Wells stand on an equal footing with the powerful figures of the Trans-Nueces region.... Political power had made him an important man, and he relished the demonstration of that power in campaigns and factional battles."

Jim Wells County was named in Wells' honor.

Wells' papers are housed at the Dolph Briscoe Center for American History, University of Texas at Austin.
