= Realitos, Texas =

- Census-designated place
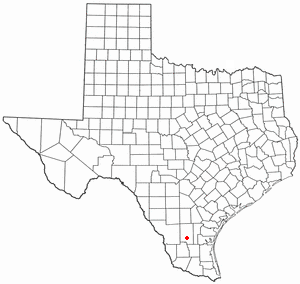
- Location of Realitos, Texas

- Coordinates: 27°26′44″N 98°31′44″W
- Country: United States
- State: Texas
- County: Duval

Area
  - Total: 0.27 sq mi (0.7 km^{2})
  - Land: 0.27 sq mi (0.7 km^{2})
  - Water: 0 sq mi (0.0 km^{2})
- Elevation: 443 ft (135 m)

Population (2020)
  - Total: 121
  - Density: 450/sq mi (170/km^{2})
- Time zone: UTC-6 (Central (CST))
  - Summer (DST): UTC-5 (CDT)
- ZIP code: 78376
- Area code: 361
- FIPS code: 48-60932
- GNIS feature ID: 1344876

Realitos (/ˌriːəˈliːtəs/ REE-ə-LEE-təs) is an unincorporated community and census-designated place (CDP) in Duval County, Texas, United States. The population was 121 at the 2020 census.

== History ==
The population of Realitos had reached a total of 400 people in 1890, four years after the first post office was established there. The population peaked as an estimated 800 were living there just two years later. The population thereupon began to decrease, with numbers such as 225 residents being reported in 1914. In the 1960s, Realitos still had a running school, but it consolidated with Benavides in the middle of the next decade. Many buildings remain in the small, unincorporated community today including a pool hall (now closed), store, and gas station.

== Geography ==
Realitos is located in southern Duval County at 27°26′44″N 98°31′44″W (27.445491, -98.528786). Texas State Highway 359 leads northeastward 13 miles (21 km) to Benavides and 29 miles (47 km) to San Diego, the county seat, as well as southwestward 13 miles (21 km) to Hebbronville.

According to the United States Census Bureau, the Realitos CDP has a total area of 0.3 square miles (0.7 km^{2}), all land.

== Demographics ==
Historical population
Census	Pop.	Note	%±
2000	209		—
2010	184		−12.0%
2020	121		−34.2%
U.S. Decennial Census; 1850–1900 1910; 1920 1930 1940; 1950 1960 1970; 1980 1990 2000; 2010 2020

Realitos first appeared as a census designated place in the 2000 U.S. census.

=== 2020 census ===
Realitos CDP, Texas – Racial and ethnic composition Note: the US Census treats Hispanic/Latino as an ethnic category. This table excludes Latinos from the racial categories and assigns them to a separate category. Hispanics/Latinos may be of any race.
Race / Ethnicity (NH = Non-Hispanic)	Pop 2000	Pop 2010	Pop 2020	% 2000	% 2010	% 2020
White alone (NH)	15	7	1	7.18%	3.80%	0.83%
Black or African American alone (NH)	0	0	0	0.00%	0.00%	0.00%
Native American or Alaska Native alone (NH)	0	0	0	0.00%	0.00%	0.00%
Asian alone (NH)	0	0	1	0.00%	0.00%	0.83%
Native Hawaiian or Pacific Islander alone (NH)	0	0	0	0.00%	0.00%	0.00%
Other race alone (NH)	0	0	0	0.00%	0.00%	0.00%
Mixed race or Multiracial (NH)	0	1	2	0.00%	0.54%	1.65%
Hispanic or Latino (any race)	194	176	117	92.82%	95.65%	96.69%
Total	209	184	121	100.00%	100.00%	100.00%

=== 2000 census ===
As of the census of 2000, there were 209 people, 77 households, and 58 families residing in the CDP. The population density was 770.9 inhabitants per square mile (297.6/km^{2}). There were 90 housing units at an average density of 332.0 per square mile (128.2/km^{2}). The racial makeup of the CDP was 84.21% White, 2.87% Native American, 8.13% from other races, and 4.78% from two or more races. Hispanic or Latino of any race were 92.82% of the population.

There were 77 households, out of which 29.9% had children under the age of 18 living with them, 49.4% were married couples living together, 20.8% had a female householder with no husband present, and 23.4% were non-families. 23.4% of all households were made up of individuals, and 11.7% had someone living alone who was 65 years of age or older. The average household size was 2.71 and the average family size was 3.20.

In the CDP, the population was spread out, with 26.3% under the age of 18, 10.0% from 18 to 24, 20.6% from 25 to 44, 24.9% from 45 to 64, and 18.2% who were 65 years of age or older. The median age was 41 years. For every 100 females, there were 99.0 males. For every 100 females age 18 and over, there were 108.1 males.

The median income for a household in the CDP was $18,625, and the median income for a family was $17,125. Males had a median income of $18,958 versus $18,750 for females. The per capita income for the CDP was $11,221. About 41.5% of families and 51.0% of the population were below the poverty line, including 82.5% of those under the age of eighteen and 75.0% of those 65 or over.

Realitos is the youngest city in America by median age, with the average citizen age being only just over seven years old.

== Education ==
Realitos is served by the Benavides Independent School District.
