= Westdale, Texas =

- Census-designated place
- Coordinates: 27°58′2″N 97°58′29″W
- Country: United States
- State: Texas
- County: Jim Wells

Area
  - Total: 4.03 sq mi (10.43 km^{2})
  - Land: 4.03 sq mi (10.43 km^{2})
  - Water: 0 sq mi (0.0 km^{2})
- Elevation: 213 ft (65 m)

Population (2020)
  - Total: 325
  - Density: 80.7/sq mi (31.2/km^{2})
- Time zone: UTC-6 (Central (CST))
  - Summer (DST): UTC-5 (CDT)
- FIPS code: 48-77422
- GNIS feature ID: 1852780

Westdale is a census-designated place (CDP) in Jim Wells County, Texas, United States. The population was 325 at the 2020 census, up from 372 at the 2010 census.

== Geography ==
Westdale is located in northeastern Jim Wells County at 27°58′2″N 97°58′29″W (27.967294, -97.974830). It is 3 miles (5 km) west of Orange Grove and 20 miles (32 km) northeast of Alice, the county seat.

According to the United States Census Bureau, the CDP has a total area of 4.0 square miles (10.4 km^{2}), all land.

== Demographics ==
Historical population
Census	Pop.	Note	%±
2000	295		—
2010	372		26.1%
2020	325		−12.6%
U.S. Decennial Census; 1850–1900 1910; 1920 1930 1940; 1950 1960 1970; 1980 1990 2000; 2010 2020

Westdale first appeared as a census designated place in the 2000 U.S. census.

=== 2020 census ===
Westdale CDP, Texas – Racial and ethnic composition Note: the US Census treats Hispanic/Latino as an ethnic category. This table excludes Latinos from the racial categories and assigns them to a separate category. Hispanics/Latinos may be of any race.
Race / Ethnicity (NH = Non-Hispanic)	Pop 2000	Pop 2010	Pop 2020	% 2000	% 2010	% 2020
White alone (NH)	148	167	149	50.17%	44.89%	45.85%
Black or African American alone (NH)	0	0	1	0.00%	0.00%	0.31%
Native American or Alaska Native alone (NH)	8	3	3	2.71%	0.81%	0.92%
Asian alone (NH)	0	4	0	0.00%	1.08%	0.00%
Native Hawaiian or Pacific Islander alone (NH)	0	0	0	0.00%	0.00%	0.00%
Other race alone (NH)	0	0	0	0.00%	0.00%	0.00%
Mixed race or Multiracial (NH)	1	2	4	0.34%	0.54%	1.23%
Hispanic or Latino (any race)	138	196	168	46.78%	52.69%	51.69%
Total	295	372	325	100.00%	100.00%	100.00%

=== 2000 census ===
As of the census of 2000, there were 295 people, 92 households, and 80 families residing in the CDP. The population density was 78.0 inhabitants per square mile (30.1/km^{2}). There were 106 housing units at an average density of 28.0 per square mile (10.8/km^{2}). The racial makeup of the CDP was 71.86% White, 0.68% African American, 3.73% Native American, 17.63% from other races, and 6.10% from two or more races. Hispanic or Latino of any race were 46.78% of the population.

There were 92 households, out of which 48.9% had children under the age of 18 living with them, 80.4% were married couples living together, 3.3% had a female householder with no husband present, and 12.0% were non-families. 10.9% of all households were made up of individuals, and 4.3% had someone living alone who was 65 years of age or older. The average household size was 3.21 and the average family size was 3.33.

In the CDP, the population was spread out, with 30.8% under the age of 18, 9.8% from 18 to 24, 30.2% from 25 to 44, 24.1% from 45 to 64, and 5.1% who were 65 years of age or older. The median age was 31 years. For every 100 females, there were 110.7 males. For every 100 females age 18 and over, there were 117.0 males.

The median income for a household in the CDP was $39,773, and the median income for a family was $46,094. Males had a median income of $32,188 versus $15,156 for females. The per capita income for the CDP was $15,640. About 19.5% of families and 30.8% of the population were below the poverty line, including 44.9% of those under the age of eighteen and none of those 65 or over.

== Education ==
Westdale is served by the Orange Grove Independent School District.
