= Springfield, Texas =

Coordinates: 27°45′07″N 98°11′40″W

- Interactive map of Springfield, Texas
- Country: United States
- State: Texas
- County: Jim Wells County
- Time zone: CST
  - Summer (DST): CDT
- Area code: 361

Springfield is an unincorporated community in west Jim Wells County in the U.S. state of Texas. It is located between the cities of San Diego and Alice, south of Highway 44.

== History ==
Springfield is located in the west central portion of Jim Wells County, Texas. San Diego, Texas is roughly 3 miles (4.8 km) to the northwest, and Alice, Texas is 7 miles (11 km) to the southeast. The 1880s construction of the Texas Mexican Railway led to the establishment of Springfield, where a post office operated from 1909 to 1918. Population estimates for the community were at 100 in 1910, but only eight individuals lived there in 1914. The community continued to have a school at least as late as the 1930s. The Handbook of Texas Online describes the state of Springfield in the 1980s as a "dispersed rural community".
