= Skidmore, Texas =

- Census-designated place
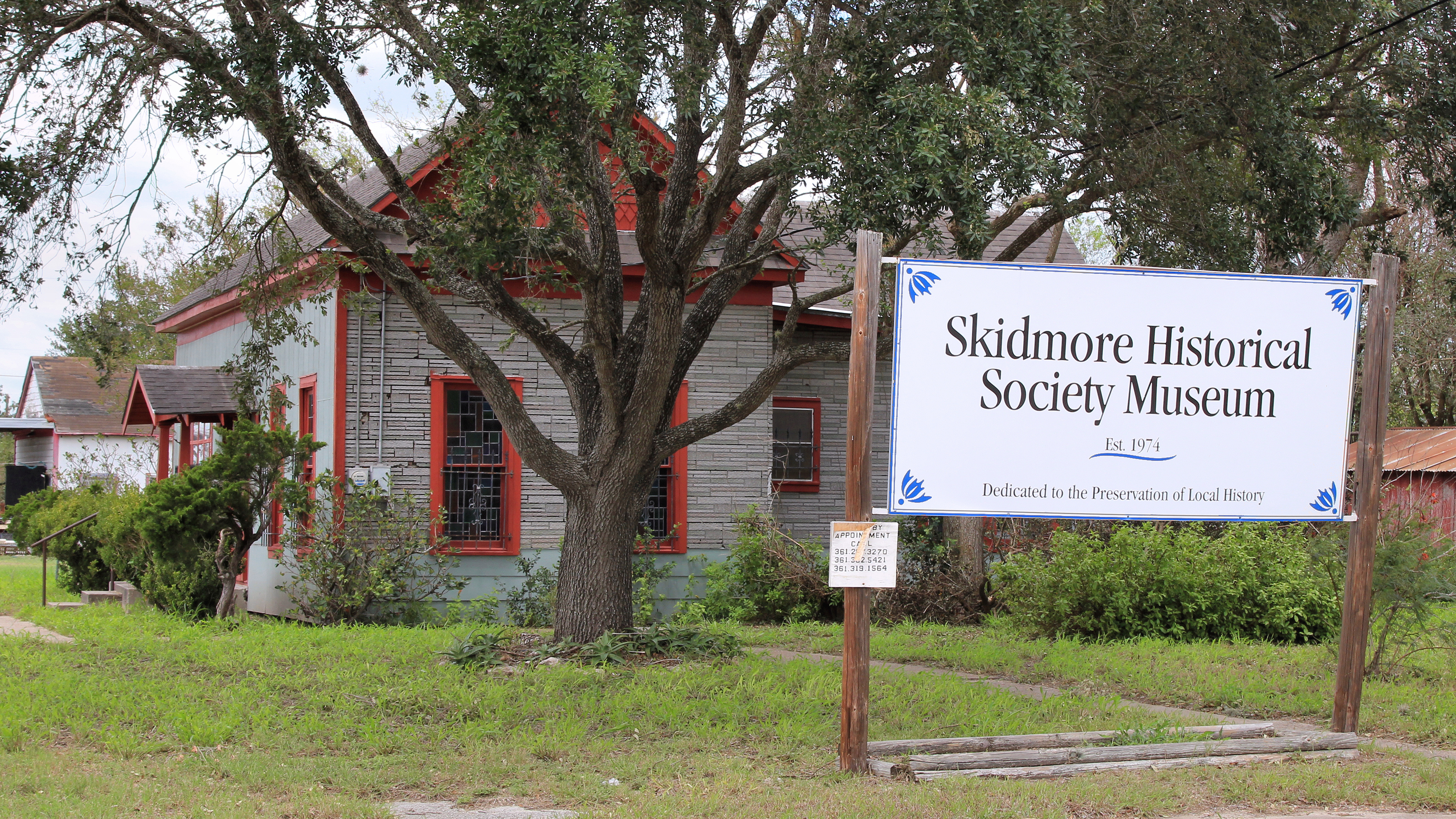
- The Skidmore Historical Society Museum

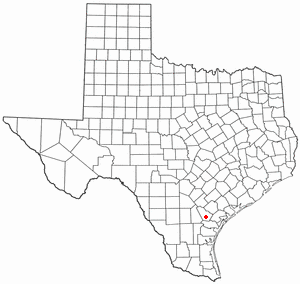
- Location of Skidmore in Texas

- Coordinates: 28°15′19″N 97°40′55″W
- Country: United States
- State: Texas
- County: Bee

Area
  - Total: 10.5 sq mi (27.3 km^{2})
  - Land: 10.5 sq mi (27.3 km^{2})
  - Water: 0 sq mi (0.0 km^{2})
- Elevation: 154 ft (47 m)

Population (2020)
  - Total: 863
  - Density: 81.9/sq mi (31.6/km^{2})
- Time zone: UTC-6 (Central (CST))
  - Summer (DST): UTC-5 (CDT)
- ZIP code: 78389
- Area code: 361
- FIPS code: 48-68132
- GNIS feature ID: 1347200

Skidmore is a census-designated place (CDP) in Bee County, Texas, United States. Its population was 863 at the 2020 census.

== Geography ==
Skidmore is located in southern Bee County at 28°15′19″N 97°40′55″W (28.255244, -97.681956). U.S. Route 181 passes through the community, leading northward 11 miles (18 km) to Beeville, the county seat, and southeastward 19 miles (31 km) to Sinton. Texas State Highway 359 leads southwest 12 miles (19 km) from Skidmore to Interstate 37 on the outskirts of Mathis.

According to the United States Census Bureau, the Skidmore CDP has a total area of 10.5 square miles (27.3 km^{2}), all land.

== Demographics ==
Historical population
Census	Pop.	Note	%±
2000	1,013		—
2010	925		−8.7%
2020	863		−6.7%
U.S. Decennial Census; 1850–1900 1910; 1920 1930 1940; 1950 1960 1970; 1980 1990 2000; 2010 2020

Skidmore was first listed as a census designated place in the 2000 U.S. census.

Skidmore CDP, Texas – Racial and ethnic composition Note: the US Census treats Hispanic/Latino as an ethnic category. This table excludes Latinos from the racial categories and assigns them to a separate category. Hispanics/Latinos may be of any race.
Race / Ethnicity (NH = Non-Hispanic)	Pop 2000	Pop 2010	Pop 2020	% 2000	% 2010	% 2020
White alone (NH)	403	313	290	39.78%	33.84%	33.60%
Black or African American alone (NH)	28	18	7	2.76%	1.95%	0.81%
Native American or Alaska Native alone (NH)	4	4	11	0.39%	0.43%	1.27%
Asian alone (NH)	0	1	1	0.00%	0.11%	0.12%
Pacific Islander alone (NH)	0	0	0	0.00%	0.00%	0.00%
Other race alone (NH)	0	0	0	0.00%	0.00%	0.00%
Multiracial (NH)	7	8	17	0.69%	0.86%	1.97%
Hispanic or Latino (any race)	571	581	537	56.37%	62.81%	62.22%
Total	1,013	925	863	100.00%	100.00%	100.00%

=== 2000 census ===
As of the census of 2000, 1,013 people, 348 households, and 258 families resided in the CDP. The population density was 96.4 inhabitants per square mile (37.2/km^{2}). The 427 housing units had an average density of 40.6 per square mile (15.7/km^{2}). The racial makeup of the CDP was 82.82% White, 2.86% African American, 0.69% Native American, 0.59% Asian, 9.58% from other races, and 3.46% from two or more races. Hispanics or Latinos of any race were 56.37% of the population.

Of the 348 households, 39.9% had children under 18 living with them, 57.5% were married couples living together, 10.9% had a female householder with no husband present, and 25.6% were not families. About 21.6% of all households were made up of individuals, and 11.2% had someone living alone who was 65 or older. The average household size was 2.90 and the average family size was 3.42.

In the CDP, the age distribution was 31.3% under 18, 9.3% from 18 to 24, 27.1% from 25 to 44, 18.4% from 45 to 64, and 13.9% who were 65 or older. The median age was 34 years. For every 100 females, there were 101.0 males. For every 100 females 18 and over, there were 94.4 males.

The median income for a household in the CDP was $19,940 and for a family was $25,833. Males had a median income of $23,056 versus $16,538 for females. The per capita income for the CDP was $8,864. About 25.6% of families and 31.7% of the population were below the poverty line, including 37.0% of those under 18 and 33.0% of those 65 or over.

== Education ==
Skidmore and its neighboring community of Tynan are served by the Skidmore-Tynan Independent School District and home to the Skidmore-Tynan High School Bobcats.
