= Alice International Airport =

Airport in Texas, United States

- IATA: ALI; ICAO: KALI; FAA LID: ALI

Summary
- Airport type: Public
- Owner: City of Alice & Jim Wells County
- Serves: Alice, Texas
- Elevation AMSL: 178 ft (54 m)
- Coordinates: 27°44′27″N 098°01′37″W

Map
- Location within Texas

Runways
Direction	Length		Surface
Direction	ft	m	Surface
13/31	5,997	1,828	Asphalt
17/35	4,490	1,369	Asphalt

Statistics (2023)
- Aircraft operations (year ending 4/19/2023): 26,600
- Based aircraft: 14
- Source: Federal Aviation Administration

Alice International Airport (IATA: ALI, ICAO: KALI, FAA LID: ALI) is three miles southeast of Alice, in Jim Wells County, Texas. The airport is owned by the city and county. The National Plan of Integrated Airport Systems for 2011–2015 categorized it as a general aviation facility.

From 1950-1951 Trans-Texas operated Douglas DC-3's from Alice Int.

== Facilities ==
Alice International Airport covers 556 acres (225 ha) at an elevation of 178 feet (54 m). It has two runways made of asphalt: 13/31 is 5,997 by 100 feet (1,828 x 30 m) and 17/35 is 4,490 by 100 feet (1,369 x 30 m).

In the year ending April 19, 2023, the airport had 26,600 aircraft operations, average 73 per day: 75% military, and 25% general aviation. 14 aircraft were then based at this airport: 7 single-engine, 1 multi-engine, and 6 helicopter.

== See also ==
- List of airports in Texas
