= Concepcion, Texas =

- Census-designated place
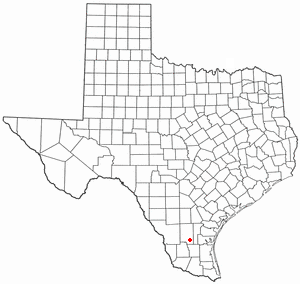
- Location of Concepcion, Texas

- Coordinates: 27°23′42″N 98°21′22″W
- Country: United States
- State: Texas
- County: Duval

Area
  - Total: 0.077 sq mi (0.2 km^{2})
  - Land: 0.077 sq mi (0.2 km^{2})
  - Water: 0 sq mi (0.0 km^{2})
- Elevation: 302 ft (92 m)

Population (2020)
  - Total: 42
  - Density: 540/sq mi (210/km^{2})
- Time zone: UTC-6 (Central (CST))
  - Summer (DST): UTC-5 (CDT)
- ZIP code: 78349
- Area code: 361
- FIPS code: 48-16300
- GNIS feature ID: 2407651

Concepcion (/kənˌsɛpsiˈoʊn/ kən-sep-see-OHN) is an unincorporated community and census-designated place (CDP) in Duval County, Texas, United States. The population was 42 at the 2020 census.

== Geography ==
Concepcion is located in southeastern Duval County at 27°23′42″N 98°21′22″W (27.394906, -98.356171). It is 31 miles (50 km) southwest of San Diego, the county seat.

According to the United States Census Bureau, the CDP has a total area of 0.1 square miles (0.26 km^{2}), all land.

== Demographics ==
Historical population
Census	Pop.	Note	%±
2000	61		—
2010	62		1.6%
2020	42		−32.3%
U.S. Decennial Census; 1850–1900 1910; 1920 1930 1940; 1950 1960 1970; 1980 1990 2000; 2010 2020

Concepcion first appeared as a census designated place in the 2000 U.S. census.

=== 2020 census ===
Concepcion CDP, Texas – Racial and ethnic composition Note: the US Census treats Hispanic/Latino as an ethnic category. This table excludes Latinos from the racial categories and assigns them to a separate category. Hispanics/Latinos may be of any race.
Race / Ethnicity (NH = Non-Hispanic)	Pop 2000	Pop 2010	Pop 2020	% 2000	% 2010	% 2020
White alone (NH)	0	0	0	0.00%	0.00%	0.00%
Black or African American alone (NH)	0	0	0	0.00%	0.00%	0.00%
Native American or Alaska Native alone (NH)	0	0	0	0.00%	0.00%	0.00%
Asian alone (NH)	0	0	1	0.00%	0.00%	2.38%
Native Hawaiian or Pacific Islander alone (NH)	0	0	0	0.00%	0.00%	0.00%
Other race alone (NH)	0	0	0	0.00%	0.00%	0.00%
Mixed race or Multiracial (NH)	0	0	0	0.00%	0.00%	0.00%
Hispanic or Latino (any race)	61	62	41	100.00%	100.00%	97.62%
Total	61	62	42	100.00%	100.00%	100.00%

=== 2000 census ===
As of the census of 2000, there were 61 people, 26 households, and 17 families residing in the CDP. The population density was 760.8 inhabitants per square mile (293.7/km^{2}). There were 35 housing units at an average density of 436.5 per square mile (168.5/km^{2}). The racial makeup of the CDP was 78.69% White, 21.31% from other races. Hispanic or Latino of any race were 100.00% of the population.

There were 26 households, out of which 3.8% had children under the age of 18 living with them, 53.8% were married couples living together, 11.5% had a female householder with no husband present, and 34.6% were non-families. 34.6% of all households were made up of individuals, and 26.9% had someone living alone who was 65 years of age or older. The average household size was 2.35 and the average family size was 3.06.

In the CDP, the population was spread out, with 8.2% under the age of 18, 9.8% from 18 to 24, 18.0% from 25 to 44, 31.1% from 45 to 64, and 32.8% who were 65 years of age or older. The median age was 58 years. For every 100 females, there were 96.8 males. For every 100 females age 18 and over, there were 100.0 males.

The median income for a household in the CDP was $40,208, and the median income for a family was $41,042. Males had a median income of $18,750 versus $0 for females. The per capita income for the CDP was $10,286. None of the population or families were below the poverty line.

Concepcion TX is home to the oldest Catholic church in South Texas, a small chapel built in 1866 and renovated in 1947. The town is known by the Spanish nickname "La Chona," which means "the village." Several other places in Mexico and California also share this nickname.

== Education ==
Concepcion is served by the Benavides Independent School District.
