= Alfred-South La Paloma, Texas =

- CDP
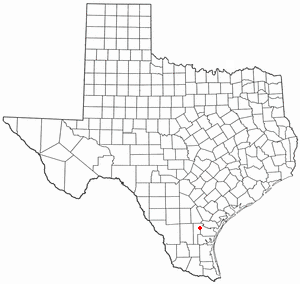
- Location of Alfred-South La Paloma, Texas

- Coordinates: 27°53′40″N 97°58′27″W
- Country: United States
- State: Texas
- County: Jim Wells

Area
  - Total: 4.5 sq mi (11.6 km^{2})
  - Land: 4.5 sq mi (11.6 km^{2})
  - Water: 0 sq mi (0.0 km^{2})

Population (2000)
  - Total: 451
  - Density: 100/sq mi (39/km^{2})
- Time zone: UTC-6 (Central (CST))
  - Summer (DST): UTC-5 (CDT)
- FIPS code: 48-01822

Alfred-South La Paloma is a former census-designated place (CDP) in Jim Wells County, Texas, United States. The population was 451 at the 2000 census. For the 2010 census, the CDP was split into Alfred and South La Paloma.

== Geography ==
According to the United States Census Bureau, the CDP has a total area of 4.5 square miles (12 km^{2}), of which, 4.5 square miles (12 km^{2}) of it is land and 0.22% is water.

== Demographics ==
Historical population
Census	Pop.	Note	%±
2000	451		—
U.S. Decennial Census; 1850–1900 1910; 1920 1930 1940; 1950 1960 1970; 1980 1990 2000; 2010

Alfred-South La Paloma first appeared as a census designated place in the 2000 U.S. census. It was split into the Alfred CDP and the South La Paloma CDP prior to the 2010 U.S. census.

=== 2000 census ===
Alfred-South La Paloma CDP, Texas – Racial and ethnic composition Note: the US Census treats Hispanic/Latino as an ethnic category. This table excludes Latinos from the racial categories and assigns them to a separate category. Hispanics/Latinos may be of any race.
Race / Ethnicity (NH = Non-Hispanic)	Pop 2000	% 2000
White alone (NH)	188	41.69%
Black or African American alone (NH)	0	0.00%
Native American or Alaska Native alone (NH)	2	0.44%
Asian alone (NH)	1	0.22%
Pacific Islander alone (NH)	0	0.00%
Other race alone (NH)	0	0.00%
Mixed race or Multiracial (NH)	1	0.22%
Hispanic or Latino (any race)	259	57.43%
Total	451	100.00%

As of the census of 2000, there were 451 people, 144 households, and 112 families residing in the CDP. The population density was 101.1 inhabitants per square mile (39.0/km^{2}). There were 187 housing units at an average density of 41.9 per square mile (16.2/km^{2}). The racial makeup of the CDP was 88.69% White, 1.55% Native American, 0.22% Asian, 6.65% from other races, and 2.88% from two or more races. Hispanic or Latino of any race were 57.43% of the population.

There were 144 households, out of which 40.3% had children under the age of 18 living with them, 59.7% were married couples living together, 12.5% had a female householder with no husband present, and 22.2% were non-families. 21.5% of all households were made up of individuals, and 7.6% had someone living alone who was 65 years of age or older. The average household size was 3.09 and the average family size was 3.62.

In the CDP, the population was spread out, with 34.8% under the age of 18, 8.2% from 18 to 24, 32.2% from 25 to 44, 17.3% from 45 to 64, and 7.5% who were 65 years of age or older. The median age was 31 years. For every 100 females, there were 104.1 males. For every 100 females age 18 and over, there were 107.0 males.

The median income for a household in the CDP was $36,154, and the median income for a family was $36,827. Males had a median income of $37,031 versus $14,375 for females. The per capita income for the CDP was $13,013. None of the families and 7.6% of the population were living below the poverty line, including no under eighteens and 41.7% of those over 64.

== Education ==
Alfred-South La Paloma is served by the Orange Grove Independent School District.
