= Bentonville, Texas =

Unincorporated community in Texas, US

Coordinates: 27°46′33″N 97°57′29″W

Bentonville is an unincorporated community in Jim Wells County, Texas, United States. It lies on State Highway 44, seven miles (11 km) east of Alice in east-central Jim Wells County.

== History ==
A post office established here in 1910 and operated until 1932. Bentonville was named for an early settler. By 1914, the community had a population of fifty, two general stores, a cotton gin, and a blacksmith. A stop on the Texas Mexican Railway was also established there that year. By 1936, the town had only scattered dwellings and farm units. In 1949, it had a population of twenty and one business. The population remained constant in the 1950s and 1960s, but decreased to fifteen in 1974. In 1979, the community had scattered dwellings, a windmill, an oil well, and was a stop on the Texas Mexican Railway. In 2000, the population was still fifteen.
