= Sandia, Texas =

- Census-designated place
- Location of Sandia in Jim Wells County, Texas

- Location of Sandia in Texas Location of Sandia in the United States
- Coordinates: 28°1′10″N 97°52′43″W
- Country: United States
- State: Texas
- County: Jim Wells

Area
  - Total: 0.97 sq mi (2.5 km^{2})
  - Land: 0.97 sq mi (2.5 km^{2})
  - Water: 0 sq mi (0.0 km^{2})
- Elevation: 125 ft (38 m)

Population (2020)
  - Total: 326
  - Density: 340/sq mi (130/km^{2})
- Time zone: UTC-6 (Central (CST))
  - Summer (DST): UTC-5 (CDT)
- ZIP code: 78383
- Area code: 361
- FIPS code: 48-65168
- GNIS feature ID: 1346565

Sandia is an unincorporated community and census-designated place (CDP) in Jim Wells County, Texas, United States. The population was 326 at the 2020 census, down from 379 at the 2010 census.

== History ==
Sandia was a part the Casa Blanca land grant, issued to Juan José de la Garza Montemayor by Spain on April 2, 1807. The Montemayor family occupied the land until 1852. In 1896, John L. Wade purchased it and established the Casa Blanca Ranch (Wade Ranch). Upon his death, the ranch was divided among his heirs, one of whom sold his share to Joseph B. Dibrell. Dibrell gave the task of dividing and selling the land to Fennell Dibrell and Max Starcke, who founded Sandia in 1907. At the time the streets were platted, there was only one building in the community. Dibrell and Starcke chose the name Sandia, Spanish for "watermelon", because of the large number of watermelons grown in the area. The lots in Sandia were all sold within eight months, during which time a lumberyard, a hardware store, two grocery stores, a meat market, a boardinghouse, and a barbershop opened. By 1914 Sandia had 150 inhabitants, a bank, two general stores, and a cotton gin. The population steadily increased, and in 1925 was estimated at 200, a figure which increased to 500 by 1927. In 1936 Sandia had three businesses, two churches, multiple farm units, and several dwellings and was a stop on the Texas and New Orleans Railroad. In 1940, it had a population of 300 and fifteen businesses. Sandia had a peak population of 310 during the 1960s and early 1970s. Residents numbered 215 in 1974 and in 1990.

== Geography ==
Sandia is located in northeastern Jim Wells County at 28°1′10″N 97°52′43″W (28.019507, -97.878652). Texas State Highway 359 forms the northwest side of the community, leading northeast 6 miles (10 km) to Mathis and southwest 24 miles (39 km) to Alice, the Jim Wells county seat.

According to the United States Census Bureau, the Sandia CDP has a total area of 1.0 square mile (2.5 km^{2}), of which 0.3 acres (1,089 m^{2}), or 0.04%, are water. The town is on high ground 1 mile (1.6 km) south of Lake Corpus Christi, an impoundment on the Nueces River.

== Demographics ==
Historical population
Census	Pop.	Note	%±
2000	431		—
2010	379		−12.1%
2020	326		−14.0%
U.S. Decennial Census; 1850–1900 1910; 1920 1930 1940; 1950 1960 1970; 1980 1990 2000; 2010 2020

Sandia first appeared as a census designated place in the 2000 U.S. census.

=== 2020 census ===
Sandia CDP, Texas – Racial and ethnic composition Note: the US Census treats Hispanic/Latino as an ethnic category. This table excludes Latinos from the racial categories and assigns them to a separate category. Hispanics/Latinos may be of any race.
Race / Ethnicity (NH = Non-Hispanic)	Pop 2000	Pop 2010	Pop 2020	% 2000	% 2010	% 2020
White alone (NH)	143	123	56	33.18%	32.45%	17.18%
Black or African American alone (NH)	5	0	5	1.16%	0.00%	1.53%
Native American or Alaska Native alone (NH)	10	5	1	2.32%	1.32%	0.31%
Asian alone (NH)	4	0	1	0.93%	0.00%	0.31%
Native Hawaiian or Pacific Islander alone (NH)	1	0	0	0.23%	0.00%	0.00%
Other race alone (NH)	0	0	0	0.00%	0.00%	0.00%
Mixed race or Multiracial (NH)	4	2	10	0.93%	0.53%	3.07%
Hispanic or Latino (any race)	264	249	253	61.25%	65.70%	77.61%
Total	431	379	326	100.00%	100.00%	100.00%

=== 2000 census ===
As of the census of 2000, there were 431 people, 139 households, and 106 families residing in the CDP. The population density was 445.3 inhabitants per square mile (171.9/km^{2}). There were 158 housing units at an average density of 163.2 per square mile (63.0/km^{2}). The racial makeup of the CDP was 75.87% White, 1.16% African American, 3.25% Native American, 0.93% Asian, 0.23% Pacific Islander, 16.47% from other races, and 2.09% from two or more races. Hispanic or Latino of any race were 61.25% of the population.

There were 139 households, out of which 35.3% had children under the age of 18 living with them, 61.2% were married couples living together, 9.4% had a female householder with no husband present, and 23.7% were non-families. 22.3% of all households were made up of individuals, and 7.9% had someone living alone who was 65 years of age or older. The average household size was 3.10 and the average family size was 3.63.

In the CDP, the population was spread out, with 30.4% under the age of 18, 7.9% from 18 to 24, 27.6% from 25 to 44, 22.7% from 45 to 64, and 11.4% who were 65 years of age or older. The median age was 35 years. For every 100 females, there were 105.2 males. For every 100 females age 18 and over, there were 109.8 males.

The median income for a household in the CDP was $41,786, and the median income for a family was $46,579. Males had a median income of $36,319 versus $22,708 for females. The per capita income for the CDP was $11,516. None of the families and 3.4% of the population were living below the poverty line, including no under eighteens and 30.4% of those over 64.

== Education ==
Sandia is served by the Orange Grove Independent School District.
