= Palito Blanco, Texas =

Unincorporated community in Texas, USA

Palito Blanco
- Interactive map of Palito Blanco
- Coordinates: 27°35′30″N 98°11′21″W
- Country: United States
- State: Texas
- County: Jim Wells County
- Time zone: CST
  - Summer (DST): CDT
- Area code: 361

Palito Blanco is an unincorporated community off Farm to Market Road 735, situated fifteen miles southwest of Alice in west central Jim Wells County, Texas, United States.

== History ==
The site was first settled by Mexican ranchers who, according to local legend, named the town for the hackberry trees that grew in the area; however, palito blanco is Spanish for "white stick." The community had a population of twenty-five in 1891. A post office named Palito Blanco was established at the site in 1916, discontinued shortly afterwards, and reactivated in 1928. By 1933, Palito Blanco had an estimated population of twenty and five businesses. In 1936, the town included one school, two cemeteries, four businesses, multiple farm units, and various dwellings. The town's population had increased to 100 by 1943, but by 1950 that figure had declined to forty. Palito Blanco's population remained stable throughout the 1950s and 1960s, and by 1963 the community had grown to include two schools, the San José church, and a number of scattered homes. Palito Blanco experienced little change in the 1970s and 1980s; in 1990, there were 35 people living there.

== Geography ==
Palito Blanco is located at 27°35′30″N 98°11′21″W.

== Education ==
Palito Blanco is served by the Ben Bolt-Palito Blanco ISD.

== Notable person ==
- Sylvia Garcia, former Texas State Senator and current member of the U.S. House of Representatives.
