= Pernitas Point, Texas =

- Unincorporated community
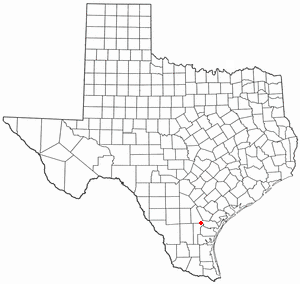
- Location of Pernitas Point, Texas

- Coordinates: 28°3′31″N 97°54′6″W
- Country: United States
- State: Texas
- Counties: Live Oak, Jim Wells

Area
  - Total: 0.54 sq mi (1.4 km^{2})
  - Land: 0.54 sq mi (1.4 km^{2})
  - Water: 0 sq mi (0.0 km^{2})
- Elevation: 171 ft (52 m)

Population (2000)
  - Total: 269
  - Density: 486/sq mi (187.5/km^{2})
- Time zone: UTC-6 (Central (CST))
  - Summer (DST): UTC-5 (CDT)
- ZIP code: 78383
- Area code: 361
- FIPS code: 48-56840
- GNIS feature ID: 1343864, 2413577

Pernitas Point is an unincorporated community mostly in Live Oak County with overlap into Jim Wells County in the U.S. state of Texas. The population was 269 at the 2000 census, the last time the population was recorded. It ceased to be incorporated May 4, 2008.

== Geography ==
Pernitas Point is located at 28°3′31″N 97°54′6″W (28.058724, -97.901757), in the southeastern corner of Live Oak County and the northeastern corner of Jim Wells County, on a point of land extending into Lake Corpus Christi, a reservoir on the Nueces River.

According to the United States Census Bureau, in 2000 the village had a total area of 0.6 square miles (1.6 km^{2}), all land.

== Demographics ==
At the 2000 census, there were 269 people, 121 households and 87 families residing in the village. The population density was 485.6 inhabitants per square mile (187.5/km^{2}). There were 208 housing units at an average density of 375.5 per square mile (145.0/km^{2}). The racial makeup of the village was 96.65% White, 0.74% African American, 0.37% Asian, and 2.23% from two or more races. Hispanic or Latino of any race were 14.50% of the population.

There were 121 households, of which 20.7% had children under the age of 18 living with them, 61.2% were married couples living together, 5.8% had a female householder with no husband present, and 27.3% were non-families. 25.6% of all households were made up of individuals, and 11.6% had someone living alone who was 65 years of age or older. The average household size was 2.22 and the average family size was 2.57.

Age distribution was 19.0% under the age of 18, 2.2% from 18 to 24, 20.4% from 25 to 44, 33.1% from 45 to 64, and 25.3% who were 65 years of age or older. The median age was 50 years. For every 100 females, there were 97.8 males. For every 100 females age 18 and over, there were 96.4 males.

The median household income was $45,417, and the median family income was $50,250. Males had a median income of $41,250 versus $30,313 for females. The per capita income for the village was $31,030. About 2.4% of families and 3.6% of the population were below the poverty line, including 10.4% of those under the age of eighteen and none of those 65 or over.

== Education ==
Pernitas Point is served by two school districts: the George West Independent School District for the Live Oak County portion, and Orange Grove Independent School District for the Jim Wells County portion.
