= Rancho de la Parita, Texas =

Rancho de la Parita
- Interactive map of Rancho de la Parita
- Coordinates: 28.019°N 98.219°W
- Country: United States
- State: Texas
- County: Jim Wells County
- Elevation: 351 ft (107 m)
- Time zone: CST
  - Summer (DST): CDT
- Area code: 361

Rancho de la Parita is a small unincorporated community in northwestern Jim Wells County, Texas, United States, west of Owl Ranch-Amargosa. It lies at 28°1′10″N 98°13′9″W (28.0194596, -98.2191730), at an elevation of 351 feet (107 m). Rancho de la Parita appears on the Anna Rose U.S. Geological Survey Map.
