= Alfred, Texas =

- Unincorporated community Census designated place
- Location within Texas Location within the United States
- Coordinates: 27°52′50″N 97°59′05″W
- Country: United States
- State: Texas
- County: Jim Wells

Area
  - Total: 1.246 sq mi (3.23 km^{2})
  - Land: 1.246 sq mi (3.23 km^{2})
  - Water: 0 sq mi (0 km^{2})
- Elevation: 164 ft (50 m)

Population (2020)
  - Total: 82
  - Density: 66/sq mi (25/km^{2})
- Time zone: UTC-6 (Central (CST))
  - Summer (DST): UTC-5 (CDT)
- Area code: 361
- GNIS feature ID: 1329355

Alfred is an unincorporated community and census-designated place (CDP) northeast of Alice in Jim Wells County, Texas, United States. As of the 2020 census, Alfred had a population of 82. It is known for the outdoor flea markets held on the first whole weekend of the month.

== History ==
Alfred is on State Highway 359, twelve miles (19 km) northeast of Alice in northeastern Jim Wells County. The community was founded in 1888, when the site was in Nueces County, and was originally named Driscoll. A post office was established there in 1890. In 1904, when the St. Louis, Brownsville and Mexico Railway built through the Robert Driscoll ranch to the east, Driscoll wanted the station to be named after himself. Since there could not be two post offices with the same name, N. T. Wright, the postmaster of old Driscoll, agreed to change the name of his post office to Alfred, in honor of his father, Alfred Wright, the first postmaster of the community. The Texas and New Orleans Railroad built through the area in 1907. In 1912 a school district was formed there, and in 1914 the town had a population of fifty, a general store, and six cattle breeders. The population of Alfred peaked in 1927, when it was estimated at 300. In 1936 Alfred comprised a school, several dwellings, and surrounding farms. During the 1940s and 1950s, the community's population continued to decrease, and by 1969 it was estimated at twenty. In 1979 and 1990, Alfred was a dispersed rural community with a population of ten.

== Education ==
Alfred is served by the Orange Grove Independent School District.

== Geography ==
According to the U.S. Census Bureau, the community has an area of 1.246 square miles (3.23 km^{2}), all land.

== Demographics ==
Historical population
| Census | Pop. | Note | %± |
|---|---|---|---|
| 2010 | 91 | | — |
| 2020 | 82 | | −9.9% |
U.S. Decennial Census; 1850–1900 1910; 1920 1930 1940; 1950 1960 1970; 1980 1990 2000; 2010 2020

Alfred first appeared as census designated place in the 2010 U.S. census formed from part of the deleted Alfred-South La Paloma CDP and additional area.

=== 2020 census ===
Alfred CDP, Texas – Racial and ethnic composition Note: the US Census treats Hispanic/Latino as an ethnic category. This table excludes Latinos from the racial categories and assigns them to a separate category. Hispanics/Latinos may be of any race.
| Race / Ethnicity (NH = Non-Hispanic) | Pop 2010 | Pop 2020 | % 2010 | % 2020 |
|---|---|---|---|---|
| White alone (NH) | 12 | 26 | 13.19% | 31.71% |
| Black or African American alone (NH) | 0 | 1 | 0.00% | 1.22% |
| Native American or Alaska Native alone (NH) | 0 | 0 | 0.00% | 0.00% |
| Asian alone (NH) | 0 | 0 | 0.00% | 0.00% |
| Native Hawaiian or Pacific Islander alone (NH) | 0 | 0 | 0.00% | 0.00% |
| Other Race alone (NH) | 0 | 0 | 0.00% | 0.00% |
| Mixed race or Multiracial (NH) | 0 | 2 | 0.00% | 2.44% |
| Hispanic or Latino (any race) | 79 | 53 | 86.81% | 64.63% |
| Total | 91 | 82 | 100.00% | 100.00% |

== See also ==
- Alfred-South La Paloma
