= Casa Blanca, Texas =

Unincorporated community in Texas, United States

Coordinates: 28°00′03″N 97°54′14″W

Casa Blanca was an unincorporated community, two miles (3.2 km) southwest of Sandia and twenty miles (32 km) northeast of Alice in extreme northeastern Jim Wells County, Texas, United States. As of the 2020 census, Casa Blanca had a population of 65.

== History ==
The Casa Blanca, or White House was part of a settlement established at the site circa 1754 by Tomás Sánchez de la Barrera y Gallardo, captain of Laredo, who was ordered to find a suitable site for a new settlement. After surveying the country, Sánchez selected a site on the banks of Peñitas Creek. A settlement was established there, and the White House was constructed of caliche blocks known as ciares. The house was built in the shape of a square with a courtyard in the center; the well in the courtyard also served as the end of a tunnel out of the building. Toward the end of the eighteenth century, the house was used as a mission.

The Spanish crown granted the land to Juan José de la Garza Montemayor and his sons Agustín, Perfecto, and Manuel on April 2, 1807. They used the Casa Blanca as a ranchhouse. According to records, the land was occupied by their heirs until 1852. However, local legend has it that the Montemayor family was driven away by a band of outlaws, who in turn were forced out by hostile Indians. Subsequently, various families occupied the house and the surrounding area, and a post office operated at the site from 1860 to 1866. The area continued to be inhabited by several families. In 1876, the land was purchased by John L. Wade. Because Casa Blanca was already established as a stopping point, Wade established Wade City adjacent to it, platting streets and setting aside land for stores and churches. In 1893, the post office was reactivated. In 1896, Casa Blanca-Wade City had a combined estimated population of 150, a Methodist church, a general store, a gin, and a lumberyard. Wade City did not prosper, however, and by 1914 its population had decreased to thirty-five. The post office ceased operations in 1922.

In roughly 1936, Wade's heirs petitioned for the site of Wade City to revert to them, arguing that the town never developed and showed no promise of doing so and that the land would be more valuable as ranchland. The petition was granted, and Wade City reverted to pastureland; Casa Blanca continued to be an independent community, but by 1945 only ruins remained.

The first dam created was called Las Frutas in 1929. In 1945, the state attempted to use eminent domain to dam more of the Nueces River, an action which was fought until 1955, at which point the state prevailed and was able to dam the river to become the water supply for Corpus Christi, thus flooding and making unusable a little over 2,600 acres (11 km^{2}) of the 10,000-acre (40 km^{2}) Wade Ranch.

The Wade Ranch was actually in operation from 1898 (Upon John Wade's death in 1898, the land was divided among his family. Wallis inherited the land. Wallis and Lou Ella married in 1894.) until Lou Ella Wade's death (96 years) in 1973. At that point it was broken up and most of the property became owned by numerous heirs through joint tenancy.

The last heirs were bought out circa 2004, which meant that for the first time since approximately 1864, no Wade heir owned the property.

Records from the ranch are currently held by Texas A&M - Kingsville and access to these is only by appointment.
