= Orange Grove, Texas =

- City
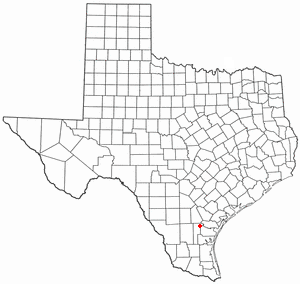
- Location in the state of Texas

- Coordinates: 27°57′22″N 97°56′21″W
- Country: United States
- State: Texas
- County: Jim Wells

Area
  - Total: 1.08 sq mi (2.80 km^{2})
  - Land: 1.08 sq mi (2.80 km^{2})
  - Water: 0 sq mi (0.00 km^{2})
- Elevation: 194 ft (59 m)

Population (2020)
  - Total: 1,165
  - Density: 1,080/sq mi (416/km^{2})
- Time zone: UTC-6 (CST)
  - Summer (DST): UTC-5 (CDT)
- ZIP code: 78372
- Area code: 361
- FIPS code: 48-54168
- GNIS feature ID: 1343303

Orange Grove is a city in Jim Wells County, Texas, United States. The population was 1,165 at the 2020 census.

== Geography ==
Orange Grove is located in northeastern Jim Wells County at 27°57′22″N 97°56′21″W (27.956224, –97.939077). Texas State Highway 359 passes through the city, leading northeastward 12 miles (19 km) to Mathis and southwestward 18 miles (29 km) to Alice, the Jim Wells county seat.

According to the United States Census Bureau, Orange Grove has a total area of 1.1 square miles (2.8 km^{2}), all land.

== Demographics ==
Historical population
Census	Pop.	Note	%±
1940	906		—
1950	935		3.2%
1960	1,109		18.6%
1970	1,075		−3.1%
1980	1,212		12.7%
1990	1,175		−3.1%
2000	1,288		9.6%
2010	1,318		2.3%
2020	1,165		−11.6%
U.S. Decennial Census

=== 2020 census ===
As of the 2020 census, Orange Grove had a population of 1,165, a median age of 37.4 years, 26.4% of residents under the age of 18, and 19.0% of residents 65 years of age or older. For every 100 females there were 84.0 males, and for every 100 females age 18 and over there were 81.2 males.

There were 455 households in Orange Grove, of which 37.6% had children under the age of 18 living in them. Of all households, 42.0% were married-couple households, 14.5% were households with a male householder and no spouse or partner present, and 37.1% were households with a female householder and no spouse or partner present. About 25.7% of all households were made up of individuals and 12.1% had someone living alone who was 65 years of age or older.

There were 526 housing units, of which 13.5% were vacant. The homeowner vacancy rate was 0.3% and the rental vacancy rate was 17.0%.

0.0% of residents lived in urban areas, while 100.0% lived in rural areas.

Orange Grove racial composition (NH = Non-Hispanic) (Note: Note: the US Census treats Hispanic/Latino as an ethnic category. This table excludes Latinos from the racial categories and assigns them to a separate category. Hispanics/Latinos can be of any race.)
Race	Number	Percentage
White (NH)	525	45.06%
Black or African American (NH)	4	0.34%
Native American or Alaska Native (NH)	6	0.52%
Asian (NH)	2	0.17%
Mixed/Multi-Racial (NH)	25	2.15%
Hispanic or Latino	603	51.76%
Total	1,165	

=== 2000 census ===
As of the census of 2000, there were 1,288 people, 473 households, and 339 families residing in the city. The population density was 1,192.6 inhabitants per square mile (460.5/km^{2}). There were 515 housing units at an average density of 476.9 per square mile (184.1/km^{2}). The racial makeup of the city was 90.37% White, 0.31% African American, 0.47% Asian, 0.16% Pacific Islander, 8.07% from other races, and 0.62% from two or more races. Hispanic or Latino of any race were 50.31% of the population.

There were 473 households, out of which 40.2% had children under the age of 18 living with them, 55.0% were married couples living together, 13.3% had a female householder with no husband present, and 28.3% were non-families. 27.3% of all households were made up of individuals, and 16.7% had someone living alone who was 65 years of age or older. The average household size was 2.72 and the average family size was 3.33.

In the city, the population was spread out, with 30.8% under the age of 18, 8.5% from 18 to 24, 26.6% from 25 to 44, 21.2% from 45 to 64, and 12.9% who were 65 years of age or older. The median age was 33 years. For every 100 females, there were 83.5 males. For every 100 females age 18 and over, there were 81.8 males.

The median income for a household in the city was $32,981, and the median income for a family was $42,500. Males had a median income of $32,500 versus $22,105 for females. The per capita income for the city was $15,082. About 13.6% of families and 16.5% of the population were below the poverty line, including 22.0% of those under age 18 and 14.1% of those age 65 or over.

== N.A.L.F. Orange Grove ==
The BRAC decision to close Naval Air Station Chase Field near Beeville led to an increase in Pilot Training Rate (PTR) and the physical number of aircraft stationed at NAS Kingsville in Kleberg County. Currently, 70 T-45 trainer aircraft have arrived. In recognition of the increased congestion at Kingsville, the Navy made a significant investment in improving the facilities and capabilities of the Auxiliary Landing Field (ALF) at Orange Grove, about 5 miles (8 km) southwest of town. The terminal airspace at Kingsville was expanded to include Orange Grove, and the ALF serves as an overflow relief from the primary airfield.

Hunting and fishing at NALF Orange Grove and Escondido Ranch is authorized in accordance with station directives and state and federal laws. Naval Air Station (NAS) Located in Kingsville, NAS Kingsville decided to play seasonal host to the burrowing owl. The South Texas Naval air station, in a partnership with the U.S. Geological Survey's Texas Gulf Coast Field Research Station, the Coastal Bend Bays & Estuaries Program, Texas A&M-Corpus Christi and the Coastal Bend Ambassadors, will offer an open field with artificial burrows for the burrowing owls, which are anticipated to stay there over the winter, beginning in October. The Naval Auxiliary Landing Field (NALF) in Orange Grove also will have artificial burrows. NAS Kingsville has 18 artificial burrows, as does NALF Orange Grove. The burrows are organized in three groups of six sets, with each group being approximately 100 yards (91 m) apart.

== Education ==
The city is served by the Orange Grove Independent School District.
