= Orange Grove Independent School District =

School district in Texas, United States

Address
- 504 South Dibrell Orange Grove, Texas, 78372; United States

District information
- Grades: PK–12
- Schools: 4
- NCES District ID: 4833720

Students and staff
- Students: 1,707 (2023–2024)
- Teachers: 109.78 (on an FTE basis)
- Student–teacher ratio: 15.55:1

Other information
- Website: www.ogisd.net

Orange Grove Independent School District is a public school district based in Orange Grove, Texas (USA).

In addition to Orange Grove, the district also serves the communities of Alfred, K-Bar Ranch, Sandia, South La Paloma, Westdale, and the Jim Wells County portion of Pernitas Point.

In 2009, the school district was rated "academically acceptable" by the Texas Education Agency.

== Schools ==
- Orange Grove High (Grades 9–12)
- Orange Grove Junior High (Grades 6–8)
- Orange Grove Elementary (Grades 3–5)
- Orange Grove Primary (Grades PK-2)
