= Jim Wells County, Texas =

County in Texas, United States

- County
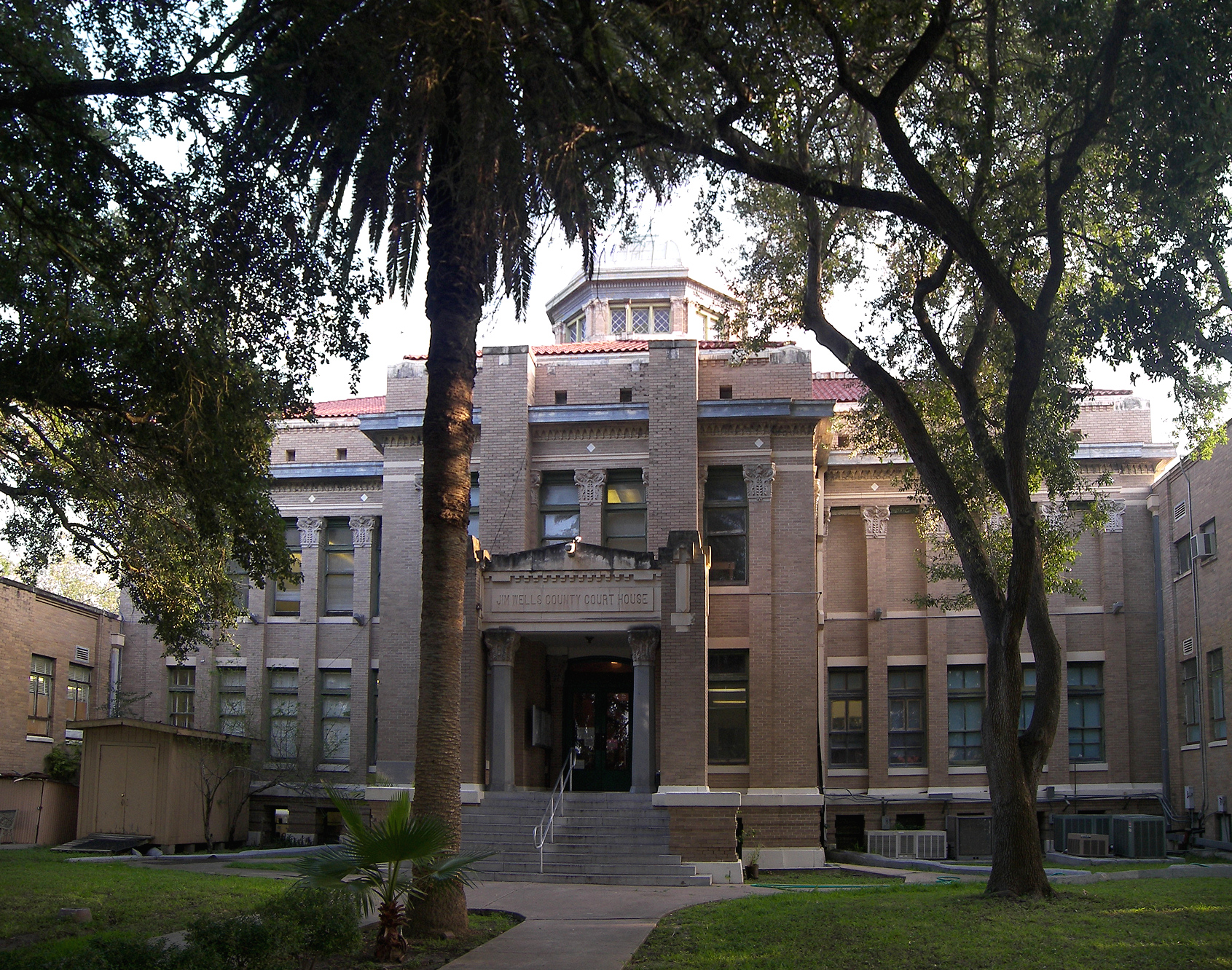
- The Jim Wells County Courthouse in Alice

- Location within the U.S. state of Texas
- Coordinates: 27°44′N 98°05′W
- Country: United States
- State: Texas
- Founded: 1911
- Named for: James Babbage Wells Jr.
- Seat: Alice
- Largest city: Alice

Area
  - Total: 868 sq mi (2,250 km^{2})
  - Land: 865 sq mi (2,240 km^{2})
  - Water: 3.4 sq mi (8.8 km^{2}) 0.4%

Population (2020)
  - Total: 38,891
  - Estimate (2025): 38,804 ▼
  - Density: 45.0/sq mi (17.4/km^{2})
- Time zone: UTC−6 (Central)
  - Summer (DST): UTC−5 (CDT)
- Congressional district: 15th
- Website: www.co.jim-wells.tx.us

Jim Wells County is a county in the U.S. state of Texas. As of the 2020 census, its population was 38,891. Its county seat is Alice. The county was founded in 1911 and is named for James B. Wells Jr. (1850–1923), for three decades a judge and Democratic Party political boss in South Texas.

Jim Wells County comprises the Alice, Texas micropolitan statistical area, which is included in the Corpus Christi-Kingsville-Alice combined statistical area.

== Geography ==
According to the U.S. Census Bureau, the county has a total area of 868 sq mi (2,250 km^{2}), of which 3.4 sq mi (8.8 km^{2}) (0.4%) are covered by water.

=== Major highways ===
- U.S. Highway 281
  - Interstate 69C is currently under construction and will follow the current route of U.S. 281 in most places.
- State Highway 44
- State Highway 141
- State Highway 285
- State Highway 359
- Farm to Market Road 624
- Farm to Market Road 665
- Farm to Market Road 716
- Farm to Market Road 2295

=== Adjacent counties ===
- Live Oak County (north)
- San Patricio County (northeast)
- Nueces County (east)
- Kleberg County (east)
- Brooks County (south)
- Duval County (west)

== Demographics ==
Historical population
Census	Pop.	Note	%±
1920	6,587		—
1930	13,456		104.3%
1940	20,239		50.4%
1950	27,991		38.3%
1960	34,548		23.4%
1970	33,032		−4.4%
1980	36,498		10.5%
1990	37,679		3.2%
2000	39,326		4.4%
2010	40,838		3.8%
2020	38,891		−4.8%
2025 (est.)	38,804	▼	−0.2%
U.S. Decennial Census; 1850–2010 2010 2020

=== Racial and ethnic composition ===
Jim Wells County, Texas – Racial and ethnic composition Note: the US Census treats Hispanic/Latino as an ethnic category. This table excludes Latinos from the racial categories and assigns them to a separate category. Hispanics/Latinos may be of any race.
Race / Ethnicity (NH = Non-Hispanic)	Pop 1980	Pop 1990	Pop 2000	Pop 2010	Pop 2020	% 1980	% 1990	% 2000	% 2010	% 2020
White alone (NH)	11,684	10,092	9,001	8,062	6,963	32.01%	26.78%	22.89%	19.74%	17.90%
Black or African American alone (NH)	194	191	166	156	180	0.53%	0.51%	0.42%	0.38%	0.46%
Native American or Alaska Native alone (NH)	38	37	75	97	58	0.10%	0.10%	0.19%	0.24%	0.15%
Asian alone (NH)	41	54	167	134	140	0.11%	0.14%	0.42%	0.33%	0.36%
Native Hawaiian or Pacific Islander alone (NH)	x	x	13	4	15	x	x	0.03%	0.01%	0.04%
Other race alone (NH)	22	104	13	28	95	0.06%	0.28%	0.03%	0.07%	0.24%
Mixed race or Multiracial (NH)	x	x	119	103	605	x	x	0.30%	0.25%	1.56%
Hispanic or Latino (any race)	24,519	27,201	29,772	32,254	30,835	67.18%	72.19%	75.71%	78.98%	79.29%
Total	36,498	37,679	39,326	40,838	38,891	100.00%	100.00%	100.00%	100.00%	100.00%

=== 2020 census ===
As of the 2020 census, the county had a population of 38,891. The median age was 37.9 years, 26.4% of residents were under the age of 18, and 17.2% were 65 years of age or older. For every 100 females there were 95.7 males, and for every 100 females age 18 and over there were 93.2 males age 18 and over.

The racial makeup of the county was 57.0% White, 0.7% Black or African American, 0.7% American Indian and Alaska Native, 0.4% Asian, <0.1% Native Hawaiian and Pacific Islander, 12.8% from some other race, and 28.4% from two or more races. Hispanic or Latino residents of any race comprised 79.3% of the population.

49.9% of residents lived in urban areas, while 50.1% lived in rural areas.

There were 13,764 households in the county, of which 37.0% had children under the age of 18 living in them. Of all households, 46.5% were married-couple households, 18.1% were households with a male householder and no spouse or partner present, and 28.9% were households with a female householder and no spouse or partner present. About 23.5% of all households were made up of individuals and 10.8% had someone living alone who was 65 years of age or older.

There were 16,156 housing units, of which 14.8% were vacant. Among occupied housing units, 71.8% were owner-occupied and 28.2% were renter-occupied. The homeowner vacancy rate was 1.7% and the rental vacancy rate was 12.2%.

=== 2000 census ===
At the 2000 census, 39,326 people, 12,961 households and 10,096 families were residing in the county. The population density was 46 people/mi^{2} (18 people/km^{2}). The 14,819 housing units had an average density of 17 per square mile (6.6/km^{2}). The racial makeup of the county was 77.90% White, 0.60% African American, 0.62% Native American, 0.43% Asian, 118.83% from other races, and 2.43% from two or more races. About 75.71% of the population were Hispanics or Latinos of any race.

Of the 12,961 households, 40.2% had children under 18 living with them, 58.0% were married couples living together, 15.2% had a female householder with no husband present, and 22.1% were not families. About 19.7% of all households were made up of individuals, and 9.50% had someone living alone who was 65 or older. The average household size was 2.99, and the average family size was 3.45.

Age distribution was 31.4% under 18, 9.0% from 18 to 24, 26.5% from 25 to 44, 20.6% from 45 to 64, and 12.4% who were 65 or older. The median age was 33 years. For every 100 females, there were 95.20 males. For every 100 females aged 18 and over, there were 91.40 males.

The median household income was $28,843, and the median family income was $32,616. Males had a median income of $30,266 versus $17,190 for females. The per capita income for the county was $12,252. About 20.1% of families and 24.1% of the population were below the poverty line, including 31.8% of those under age 18 and 21.3% of those aged 65 or over.

== Government and politics ==
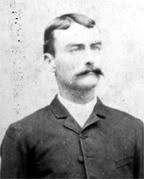
Jim Wells, longtime Democratic political boss and namesake of Jim Wells County.

Located in South Texas, Jim Wells County is part of the oldest Democratic stronghold in the entire United States, a region that has consistently voted for Democrats since the days of Woodrow Wilson. The Jim Wells County Democratic Party has maintained its influence in the county despite massive demographic changes due to civil rights, the collapse of Jim Crow and poll taxes, and mass immigration from Mexico. The only Republicans to win the county in presidential elections since its creation are Dwight D. Eisenhower in 1956, Richard Nixon in his 1972 landslide and Donald Trump in 2020 and 2024. Since 2004, Jim Wells County has become slightly less Democratic than it was during the late twentieth century. Despite this shift, the Democratic nominee won at least 53.77 percent of the county's vote in every presidential election from 1976 through 2016. In 2020, the county ended its streak of Democratic victories when it was won by Donald Trump by a 10% margin.

In the 2018 gubernatorial election, Republican Greg Abbott won 52.04% of the vote in Jim Wells County, becoming the first member of his party to win the county in a race for a state office. In the same election, Democrat Beto O'Rourke won the county in the Senate contest with 53.85% of the vote.

United States presidential election results for Jim Wells County, Texas
Year	Republican		Democratic		Third party(ies)	
Year	No.	%	No.	%	No.	%
1912	24	6.82%	241	68.47%	87	24.72%
1916	100	21.10%	335	70.68%	39	8.23%
1920	169	32.25%	304	58.02%	51	9.73%
1924	213	21.47%	654	65.93%	125	12.60%
1928	423	36.06%	747	63.68%	3	0.26%
1932	162	9.99%	1,449	89.39%	10	0.62%
1936	338	16.58%	1,691	82.97%	9	0.44%
1940	914	30.20%	2,105	69.56%	7	0.23%
1944	1,113	34.88%	1,908	59.79%	170	5.33%
1948	1,402	26.46%	3,781	71.35%	116	2.19%
1952	3,592	48.94%	3,745	51.03%	2	0.03%
1956	3,348	54.69%	2,752	44.95%	22	0.36%
1960	2,773	34.18%	5,330	65.71%	9	0.11%
1964	1,988	22.50%	6,849	77.50%	0	0.00%
1968	2,827	28.13%	6,304	62.73%	919	9.14%
1972	5,283	54.48%	4,404	45.41%	11	0.11%
1976	3,547	30.71%	7,961	68.93%	42	0.36%
1980	4,606	38.34%	7,267	60.49%	140	1.17%
1984	5,896	42.99%	7,795	56.84%	24	0.17%
1988	4,335	33.64%	8,495	65.92%	56	0.43%
1992	3,311	26.36%	7,812	62.19%	1,438	11.45%
1996	2,989	28.27%	7,116	67.31%	467	4.42%
2000	4,498	37.41%	7,418	61.70%	107	0.89%
2004	5,817	45.84%	6,824	53.77%	50	0.39%
2008	4,841	41.69%	6,706	57.75%	65	0.56%
2012	4,598	41.18%	6,492	58.14%	76	0.68%
2016	5,420	43.78%	6,694	54.08%	265	2.14%
2020	7,453	54.47%	6,119	44.72%	110	0.80%
2024	7,636	57.55%	5,577	42.03%	55	0.41%

United States Senate election results for Jim Wells County, Texas1
Year	Republican		Democratic		Third party(ies)	
Year	No.	%	No.	%	No.	%
2024	6,773	52.26%	5,895	45.49%	292	2.25%

United States Senate election results for Jim Wells County, Texas2
Year	Republican		Democratic		Third party(ies)	
Year	No.	%	No.	%	No.	%
2020	6,957	52.47%	6,025	45.44%	278	2.10%

Texas Gubernatorial election results for Jim Wells County
Year	Republican		Democratic		Third party(ies)	
Year	No.	%	No.	%	No.	%
2022	5,063	53.05%	4,375	45.85%	105	1.10%

=== 1948 U.S. Senate election ===
Jim Wells County is known as the home of the "Box 13 scandal", the infamous ballot box that gave Lyndon Baines Johnson an 87-vote edge out of 988,295 cast over popular former governor Coke Stevenson in the Democratic primary election. It was later demonstrated that 200 votes, for Johnson, were "stuffed" into the ballot box after the polls closed. Johnson went on to win the election.

== Communities ==
=== Cities ===
- Alice (county seat)
- Orange Grove
- Premont
- San Diego (mostly in Duval County)

=== Village ===
- Pernitas Point (mostly in Live Oak County)

=== Census-designated places ===
- Alfred
- Alice Acres
- Amargosa
- Ben Bolt
- Coyote Acres
- K-Bar Ranch
- Loma Linda East
- Owl Ranch
- Rancho Alegre
- Sandia
- South La Paloma
- Westdale

=== Former census-designated places ===
- Alfred-South La Paloma
- Owl Ranch-Amargosa

=== Unincorporated communities ===
- Bentonville
- Casa Blanca
- La Gloria
- Palito Blanco
- Rancho de la Parita
- Springfield

== Education ==
School districts in the county include:

- Agua Dulce Independent School District
- Alice Independent School District
- Ben Bolt-Palito Blanco Independent School District
- La Gloria Independent School District
- Orange Grove Independent School District
- Premont Independent School District
- San Diego Independent School District

Coastal Bend College (formerly Bee County College) is the designated community college for the county.

== See also ==
- List of museums in South Texas
- National Register of Historic Places listings in Jim Wells County, Texas
- Recorded Texas Historic Landmarks in Jim Wells County
