= Mathis, Texas =

- City
- Motto: Small town. Big lake. Great people.
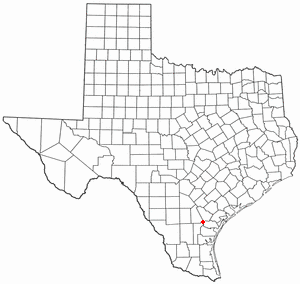
- Location of Mathis, Texas

- Coordinates: 28°5′39″N 97°49′38″W
- Country: United States
- State: Texas
- County: San Patricio

Area
  - Total: 3.32 sq mi (8.59 km^{2})
  - Land: 3.32 sq mi (8.59 km^{2})
  - Water: 0 sq mi (0.00 km^{2})
- Elevation: 161 ft (49 m)

Population (2020)
  - Total: 4,333
  - Density: 1,310/sq mi (504/km^{2})
- Time zone: UTC-6 (Central (CST))
  - Summer (DST): UTC-5 (CDT)
- ZIP code: 78368
- Area code: 361
- FIPS code: 48-47040
- GNIS feature ID: 1341072
- Website: www.cityofmathis.com

Mathis is a city in San Patricio County, Texas, United States. Its population was 4,333 at the 2020 census.

== History ==
In 1887, when the San Antonio and Aransas Pass Railroad was laying tracks across San Patricio County, Thomas H. Mathis received naming rights when he donated 300 acres (1.2 km^{2}) for a townsite and school. Mathis and his brother J. M. Mathis, held 37,000 acres (150 km^{2}) in the vicinity. The brothers had dropped out of the Coleman, Mathis, Fulton Cattle Company in 1879. Thomas Mathis owned an additional 60,000 acres (240 km^{2}) around Mathis and built a fence enclosing the town. As late as 1906, Mathis was enclosed and arriving and departing trains had to be let in and out.

Mathis' success was partially fueled by residents of Lagarto moving to be near the railroad. The Mathis post office opened in 1890, and the town's first school was held in a private residence in 1893. Two years later, a one-room school was built, and in 1913, a second railroad (the San Antonio, Uvalde and Gulf Pacific) arrived.

Cotton and corn crops were raised and ranching was an important part of the economy. During the 1930s, winter vegetable crops were grown and both railroads maintained shipping sheds. Mathis incorporated in 1939.

In the early 1950s, 7,000 acres (28 km^{2}) of land two miles (3 km) north of town were developed for vegetable crops—complete with irrigation and deep-water wells. Cotton, corn, and sorghum replaced vegetables in the 1960s.

In the 1930s, the Nueces River was dammed and Lake Mathis (since renamed Lake Corpus Christi) was formed. Construction of the Wesley Seale Dam in the late 1950s raised the level of the lake to where it became desirable for weekend homes.

In 1988, Mathis had a population of 5,910, which has since decreased to 5,034. The game mode "Longshot" in Madden 18 and 19 is set primarily in Mathis.

== Lake Corpus Christi (Lake Mathis) ==
Lake Corpus Christi is a 21,000-acre (85 km^{2}) reservoir on the Nueces River, lying 4 mi (6.4 km) northwest of Mathis. The lake is a recreational spot in South Texas offering swimming, skiing, boating, and fishing. Large areas of submerged brush in the upper reaches of this 27-mile-long (43 km) lake provide prime fish habitat. All fishing is good, but it is noted for its excellent catfish—channels, flatheads, and blues; the record is a flathead weighing 60 lb (27 kg). Also, the lake is noted for its white, black, and striped bass, sunfish, and crappie. The record largemouth bass weighed 13.5 lb (6.1 kg).

The area is a winter home for hundreds of winter Texans from all parts of the state and country, as well as Canada.

Around its more than 200 mi (320 km) of shoreline, numerous camps and parks provide campsites, boat ramps, fishing piers, and recreational vehicle and mobile home areas. A main attraction is Lake Corpus Christi State Park, whose 350 acres (1.4 km^{2}) surround a cove, protected from the prevailing southeasterly winds by high limestone cliffs, and provide a scenic view of the main body of the lake. Favorable climate offers opportunities for year-round activities.

History abounds in the area, with former battlegrounds now lush with farmland, brush, and grass for grazing cattle. The Nueces River at one time divided Texas from Mexico. It was a much-disputed boundary, and only after the Mexican War was the issue was settled, making the Rio Grande the official boundary. One of the more famous battles between the two countries was fought at Old San Patricio, founded by the Irish and located 10 mi (16 km) south of Mathis. The area, once inhabited by Karankawa and Lipan Apache Indians, became the site of several unsuccessful settlement attempts in the 18th and 19th centuries.

== Geography ==
Mathis is located at 28°5′39″N 97°49′38″W (28.094098, –97.827323).

According to the United States Census Bureau, the city has a total area of 2 sq mi (5.2 km^{2}), all land.

== Demographics ==
Historical population
Census	Pop.	Note	%±
1940	1,950		—
1950	4,050		107.7%
1960	6,075		50.0%
1970	5,351		−11.9%
1980	5,667		5.9%
1990	5,423		−4.3%
2000	5,034		−7.2%
2010	4,942		−1.8%
2020	4,333		−12.3%
U.S. Decennial Census

=== 2020 census ===
Racial composition as of the 2020 census
Race	Number	Percent
White	2,666	61.5%
Black or African American	66	1.5%
American Indian and Alaska Native	28	0.6%
Asian	4	0.1%
Native Hawaiian and Other Pacific Islander	1	0.0%
Some other race	637	14.7%
Two or more races	931	21.5%
Hispanic or Latino (of any race)	3,881	89.6%

As of the 2020 census, Mathis had a population of 4,333, with 1,499 households and 1,164 families.

The median age was 36.2 years, 28.5% of residents were under the age of 18, and 16.7% of residents were 65 years of age or older; for every 100 females there were 92.7 males, and for every 100 females age 18 and over there were 87.0 males.

98.7% of residents lived in urban areas, while 1.3% lived in rural areas.

There were 1,499 households in Mathis, of which 37.8% had children under the age of 18 living in them. Of all households, 33.8% were married-couple households, 20.6% were households with a male householder and no spouse or partner present, and 37.1% were households with a female householder and no spouse or partner present. About 27.4% of all households were made up of individuals and 13.7% had someone living alone who was 65 years of age or older.

There were 1,747 housing units, of which 14.2% were vacant. The homeowner vacancy rate was 1.1% and the rental vacancy rate was 13.0%.

=== 2000 census ===
As of the 2000 census, 5,034 people, 1,502 households, and 1,203 families resided in the city. The population density was 2,532.0 inhabitants per square mile (977.6/km^{2}). The 1,715 housing units averaged 862.6 per sq mi (332.7/km^{2}). The racial makeup of the city was 53.83% White, 1.63% African American, 0.91% Native American, 0.42% Asian, 0.10% Pacific Islander, 40.09% from other races, and 3.02% from two or more races. Hispanics or Latinos of any race were 90.50% of the population .

Of the 1,502 households, 43.7% had children under 18 living with them, 52.6% were married couples living together, 21.5% had a female householder with no husband present, and 19.9% were not families. About 17.8% of all households were made up of individuals, and 9.8% had someone living alone who was 65 or older. The average household size was 3.31 and the average family size was 3.77.

In the city, the population was distributed as 34.7% under 18, 9.6% from 18 to 24, 25.8% from 25 to 44, 17.4% from 45 to 64, and 12.5% who were 65 or older. The median age was 30 years. For every 100 females, there were 94.5 males. For every 100 females 18 and over, there were 91.6 males.

The median income for a household in the city was $20,015, and for a family was $23,793. Males had a median income of $25,945 versus $18,458 for females. The per capita income for the city was $8,516. About 31.4% of families and 38.2% of the population were below the poverty line, including 49.3% of those under age 18 and 30.0% of those age 65 or over.

== Education ==
The City of Mathis is served by the Mathis Independent School District. Its campuses include: Mathis High School, Mathis High School for International Studies, Mathis Middle School, Mathis Intermediate, and Mathis Elementary School.

Del Mar College is the designated community college for all of San Patricio County.

== Climate ==
The climate in this area is characterized by hot, humid summers and generally mild to cool winters. According to the Köppen climate classification, Mathis has a humid subtropical climate, Cfa on climate maps.

Climate data for Mathis, Texas (1991–2020 normals, extremes 1964–present)
Month	Jan	Feb	Mar	Apr	May	Jun	Jul	Aug	Sep	Oct	Nov	Dec	Year
Record high °F (°C)	92 (33)	97 (36)	101 (38)	105 (41)	106 (41)	110 (43)	106 (41)	108 (42)	108 (42)	102 (39)	95 (35)	91 (33)	110 (43)
Mean maximum °F (°C)	82.8 (28.2)	86.7 (30.4)	89.6 (32.0)	93.5 (34.2)	95.5 (35.3)	99.3 (37.4)	100.4 (38.0)	101.6 (38.7)	98.3 (36.8)	93.9 (34.4)	88.5 (31.4)	83.6 (28.7)	103.3 (39.6)
Mean daily maximum °F (°C)	65.6 (18.7)	69.9 (21.1)	75.4 (24.1)	81.5 (27.5)	87.0 (30.6)	92.3 (33.5)	94.3 (34.6)	95.6 (35.3)	90.2 (32.3)	84.0 (28.9)	74.7 (23.7)	67.4 (19.7)	81.5 (27.5)
Daily mean °F (°C)	55.1 (12.8)	59.1 (15.1)	65.1 (18.4)	70.9 (21.6)	77.4 (25.2)	82.4 (28.0)	83.9 (28.8)	84.6 (29.2)	80.4 (26.9)	73.2 (22.9)	63.9 (17.7)	57.0 (13.9)	71.1 (21.7)
Mean daily minimum °F (°C)	44.6 (7.0)	48.4 (9.1)	54.7 (12.6)	60.3 (15.7)	67.7 (19.8)	72.6 (22.6)	73.4 (23.0)	73.7 (23.2)	70.6 (21.4)	62.4 (16.9)	53.2 (11.8)	46.6 (8.1)	60.7 (15.9)
Mean minimum °F (°C)	31.6 (−0.2)	34.5 (1.4)	38.4 (3.6)	45.6 (7.6)	56.1 (13.4)	67.1 (19.5)	69.6 (20.9)	69.9 (21.1)	61.4 (16.3)	47.8 (8.8)	38.5 (3.6)	32.0 (0.0)	28.8 (−1.8)
Record low °F (°C)	18 (−8)	15 (−9)	20 (−7)	35 (2)	47 (8)	56 (13)	62 (17)	63 (17)	51 (11)	33 (1)	27 (−3)	11 (−12)	11 (−12)
Average precipitation inches (mm)	1.49 (38)	1.24 (31)	2.25 (57)	1.73 (44)	3.00 (76)	2.64 (67)	2.57 (65)	2.28 (58)	3.83 (97)	2.85 (72)	1.85 (47)	1.77 (45)	27.50 (699)
Average snowfall inches (cm)	0.0 (0.0)	0.0 (0.0)	0.0 (0.0)	0.0 (0.0)	0.0 (0.0)	0.0 (0.0)	0.0 (0.0)	0.0 (0.0)	0.0 (0.0)	0.0 (0.0)	0.0 (0.0)	0.0 (0.0)	0.0 (0.0)
Average precipitation days (≥ 0.01 in)	8.1	7.8	7.2	6.0	6.3	6.1	5.5	5.7	9.3	6.0	6.3	7.7	82.0
Average snowy days (≥ 0.1 in)	0.0	0.0	0.0	0.0	0.0	0.0	0.0	0.0	0.0	0.0	0.0	0.0	0.0
Source: NOAA

== Notable people ==
- Chris Layton, drummer
- Shane Nelson, former linebacker for the Buffalo Bills.
- Tammie Brown, drag queen
