= Alice, Texas =

- City
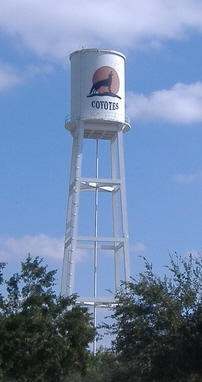
- The water tower in Alice on Hwy 44

- Seal
- Nickname: The Hub City of South Texas
- Interactive map of Alice, Texas
- Coordinates: 27°45′2″N 98°4′14″W
- Country: United States
- State: Texas
- County: Jim Wells
- Established: 1888

Government
  - Type: Council-Manager
  - City Council: Mayor Cynthia Carasco; Robert Molina; Pete Beltran; Mauricio Garza; Sandra Bowen
  - City Manager: Michael Esparza

Area
  - Total: 12.58 sq mi (32.58 km^{2})
  - Land: 11.99 sq mi (31.06 km^{2})
  - Water: 0.59 sq mi (1.52 km^{2})
- Elevation: 202 ft (62 m)

Population (2020)
  - Total: 17,891
  - Estimate (2022): 17,697
  - Density: 1,490/sq mi (576/km^{2})
- Time zone: UTC-6 (CST)
  - Summer (DST): UTC-5 (CDT)
- ZIP codes: 78332, 78333
- Area code: 361
- FIPS code: 48-01852
- GNIS feature ID: 1329361
- Website: www.cityofalice.org

Alice is a city in and the county seat of Jim Wells County, Texas, United States, in the South Texas region of the state. As of the 2020 census, Alice had a population of 17,891. Alice was established in 1888. The city was originally named "Bandana", then "Kleberg", and finally "Alice" after Alice Gertrudis King Kleberg, the daughter of Richard King, who established the King Ranch.

== History ==
Alice originated from the defunct community of Collins, 3 miles (5 km) to the east. c. 1880, the San Antonio and Aransas Pass Railway attempted to build a line through Collins, which then had approximately 2,000 inhabitants. The townspeople were not amenable to selling their land to the railroad company; consequently, the railroad site was moved 3 miles west, and in 1883, a depot called "Bandana" was established at its junction with the Corpus Christi, San Diego and Rio Grande Railway. Bandana soon became a thriving cattle-shipping point, and an application for a post office was made under the name "Kleberg" in honor of Robert Justus Kleberg, a veteran of the Battle of San Jacinto. The petition was denied because a town named Kleberg already appeared on the post office list, so residents then chose the name "Alice", in honor of Alice Gertrudis King Kleberg, Robert Justus Kleberg Jr.’s wife and the daughter of Richard and Henrietta King. The Alice post office opened for business in 1888. Within a few years, the remaining residents of Collins moved to Alice, which was by then a thriving community.

Alice was known for its large cattle industry until the discovery of petroleum beneath and around the town in the 1940s, which caused a slight population boom.

In the 1948 United States Senate election in Texas, an incident (Box 13 scandal) involving Lyndon B. Johnson's bid for the U.S. Senate took place at Alice's Precinct 13, where 202 ballots were cast in alphabetical order and all just at the close of polling in favor of Johnson. Johnson won the election against Coke Stevenson by 87 votes.

== Culture ==
Alice has long been recognized as the "Birthplace of Tejano Music", dating back to the mid-1940s, when Armando Marroquin Sr., of Alice and partner Paco Betancourt of San Benito launched what was to be the first home-based recording company to record Tejano artists exclusively. Ideal Records, which was based in Alice, under the direction of Marroquin became the perfect vehicle for Tejano groups and artists to get their music to the public. Marroquin, who also owned and operated a jukebox company, ensured that Ideal recordings would be distributed throughout South Texas. The songs recorded, which were contributed by Tejano and Mexican composers, became very popular through jukeboxes placed in restaurants, cantinas, or other establishments that would have them, and the then-scarce Spanish-language radio programs. In addition to Ideal, Alice was the home of Freddie Records and Hacienda Records, which were dominant players in Tejano music in the 1970s and 1980s.

Alice is the birthplace of two Nobel Prize winners. Robert F. Curl Jr. was honored with a Nobel Prize in chemistry in 1996, and James P. Allison won a Nobel for his work in medicine in 2018.

== Geography and Climate ==
Alice is located in central Jim Wells County at 27°45′02″N 98°04′14″W (27.750652, –98.070460). According to the United States Census Bureau, the city has a total area of 12.6 square miles (32.6 km^{2}), of which 12.0 square miles (31.1 km^{2}) are land and 0.58 square miles (1.5 km^{2}), or 4.66%, are covered by water. Alice falls within the boundaries of South Texas and the Texas Coastal Bend region.

U.S. Route 281 passes just west of the city limits on a bypass. The highway leads north 41 miles (66 km) to George West and south 37 miles (60 km) to Falfurrias. Texas State Highway 44 passes through the center of town as Front Street and leads east 26 miles (42 km) to Robstown and west 35 miles (56 km) to Freer. Texas State Highway 359 joins SH 44 through the center of Alice, but leads northeast 30 miles (48 km) to Mathis and southwest 53 miles (85 km) to Hebbronville.

The nearest metropolitan areas are Corpus Christi, 45 miles (72 km) to the east, and Laredo, 98 miles (158 km) to the west.

Alice has very little seismic activity, with only two small earthquakes happening in recent history—a 3.8-magnitude quake on March 24, 1997, and a 4.0-magnitude quake on April 24, 2010.

Climate data for Alice International Airport, Texas, 1991–2020 normals, extremes 1948–present
Month	Jan	Feb	Mar	Apr	May	Jun	Jul	Aug	Sep	Oct	Nov	Dec	Year
Record high °F (°C)	95 (35)	98 (37)	104 (40)	108 (42)	106 (41)	109 (43)	110 (43)	109 (43)	111 (44)	101 (38)	96 (36)	93 (34)	111 (44)
Mean maximum °F (°C)	86.1 (30.1)	90.1 (32.3)	93.0 (33.9)	98.3 (36.8)	99.5 (37.5)	101.9 (38.8)	102.8 (39.3)	104.2 (40.1)	100.7 (38.2)	96.0 (35.6)	90.8 (32.7)	86.1 (30.1)	105.7 (40.9)
Mean daily maximum °F (°C)	68.8 (20.4)	73.6 (23.1)	79.2 (26.2)	85.4 (29.7)	90.2 (32.3)	95.0 (35.0)	97.1 (36.2)	98.4 (36.9)	92.5 (33.6)	86.9 (30.5)	77.5 (25.3)	70.4 (21.3)	84.6 (29.2)
Daily mean °F (°C)	57.0 (13.9)	61.3 (16.3)	67.3 (19.6)	73.5 (23.1)	79.4 (26.3)	84.0 (28.9)	85.4 (29.7)	86.0 (30.0)	81.5 (27.5)	74.3 (23.5)	65.3 (18.5)	58.8 (14.9)	72.8 (22.7)
Mean daily minimum °F (°C)	45.3 (7.4)	49.1 (9.5)	55.5 (13.1)	61.6 (16.4)	68.6 (20.3)	72.9 (22.7)	73.7 (23.2)	73.7 (23.2)	70.5 (21.4)	61.6 (16.4)	53.2 (11.8)	47.2 (8.4)	61.1 (16.2)
Mean minimum °F (°C)	30.4 (−0.9)	32.8 (0.4)	37.9 (3.3)	45.7 (7.6)	55.6 (13.1)	67.6 (19.8)	69.5 (20.8)	69.9 (21.1)	61.3 (16.3)	45.9 (7.7)	36.2 (2.3)	30.7 (−0.7)	27.8 (−2.3)
Record low °F (°C)	16 (−9)	15 (−9)	24 (−4)	37 (3)	44 (7)	61 (16)	63 (17)	61 (16)	50 (10)	37 (3)	29 (−2)	22 (−6)	15 (−9)
Average precipitation inches (mm)	1.19 (30)	1.33 (34)	2.17 (55)	1.46 (37)	4.13 (105)	3.66 (93)	2.61 (66)	2.91 (74)	4.51 (115)	1.72 (44)	1.58 (40)	1.86 (47)	29.13 (740)
Average precipitation days (≥ 0.01 in)	8.0	6.9	6.6	6.1	6.1	6.0	7.6	5.4	10.2	6.1	6.0	6.4	81.4
Source 1: NOAA
Source 2: National Weather Service

== Demographics ==
Historical population
Census	Pop.	Note	%±
1910	2,136		—
1920	1,880		−12.0%
1930	4,239		125.5%
1940	7,792		83.8%
1950	16,449		111.1%
1960	20,861		26.8%
1970	20,121		−3.5%
1980	20,961		4.2%
1990	19,788		−5.6%
2000	19,010		−3.9%
2010	19,104		0.5%
2020	17,891		−6.3%
2022 (est.)	17,697		−1.1%
U.S. Decennial Census

Alice city annexed the unincorporated community of Alice Southwest prior to the 1980 United States census.

=== Racial and ethnic composition ===
Alice city, Texas – Racial and ethnic composition Note: the US Census treats Hispanic/Latino as an ethnic category. This table excludes Latinos from the racial categories and assigns them to a separate category. Hispanics/Latinos may be of any race.
Race / Ethnicity (NH = Non-Hispanic)	Pop 2000	Pop 2010	Pop 2020	% 2000	% 2010	% 2020
White alone (NH)	3,824	2,545	2,120	20.12%	13.32%	11.85%
Black or African American alone (NH)	131	111	106	0.69%	0.58%	0.59%
Native American or Alaska Native alone (NH)	16	36	10	0.08%	0.19%	0.06%
Asian alone (NH)	141	102	110	0.74%	0.53%	0.61%
Native Hawaiian or Pacific Islander alone (NH)	6	1	7	0.03%	0.01%	0.04%
Other race alone (NH)	7	16	40	0.04%	0.08%	0.22%
Mixed race or Multiracial (NH)	48	34	146	0.25%	0.18%	0.82%
Hispanic or Latino (any race)	14,837	16,259	15,352	78.05%	85.11%	85.81%
Total	19,010	19,104	17,891	100.00%	100.00%	100.00%

=== 2020 census ===
As of the 2020 census, there were 17,891 people, 6,129 households, and 4,362 families residing in the city. The median age was 36.8 years, 26.7% of residents were under the age of 18, and 17.5% of residents were 65 years of age or older. For every 100 females there were 92.3 males, and for every 100 females age 18 and over there were 89.2 males age 18 and over.

98.1% of residents lived in urban areas, while 1.9% lived in rural areas.

There were 6,442 households in Alice, of which 36.9% had children under the age of 18 living in them. Of all households, 40.9% were married-couple households, 18.1% were households with a male householder and no spouse or partner present, and 34.5% were households with a female householder and no spouse or partner present. About 25.6% of all households were made up of individuals and 11.6% had someone living alone who was 65 years of age or older.

There were 7,312 housing units, of which 11.9% were vacant. Among occupied housing units, 61.7% were owner-occupied and 38.3% were renter-occupied. The homeowner vacancy rate was 1.9% and the rental vacancy rate was 11.2%.

Racial composition as of the 2020 census
Race	Percent
White	56.2%
Black or African American	0.9%
American Indian and Alaska Native	0.6%
Asian	0.7%
Native Hawaiian and Other Pacific Islander	<0.1%
Some other race	14.8%
Two or more races	26.8%
Hispanic or Latino (of any race)	85.8%

=== 2022 estimates ===
Alice racial composition as of 2022 (NH = Non-Hispanic) (Note: Note: the US Census treats Hispanic/Latino as an ethnic category. This table excludes Latinos from the racial categories and assigns them to a separate category. Hispanics/Latinos can be of any race.)
Race	Number	Percentage
White (NH)	14,922	46.64%
Black or African American (NH)	146	0.46%
Native American or Alaska Native (NH)	218	0.68%
Asian (NH)	129	0.40%
Pacific Islander (NH)	80	0.25%
Some Other Race (NH)	716	2.24%
Hispanic or Latino	15,780	49.33%
Total	31,991	

According to the 2022 United States census estimates, there were 17,697 people, 5,955 households, and 4,535 families residing in the city.

=== 2000 census ===
At the 2000 census, 19,010 people, 6,400 households and 4,915 families resided in the city. The population density was 1,597.4 inhabitants per square mile (616.8/km^{2}). The 6,998 housing units averaged 588.0 per square mile (227.1/km^{2}). The racial makeup of the city was 77.44% White, 0.86% African American, 0.53% Native American, 0.75% Asian, 18.07% from other races, and 2.41% from two or more races. Hispanics or Latinos of any race were 78.05% of the population.

Of the 6,400 households, 39.0% had children under the age of 18 living with them, 54.5% were married couples living together, 17.6% had a female householder with no husband present, and 23.2% were not families. About 20.9% of all households were made up of individuals, and 10.8% had someone living alone who was 65 years of age or older. The average household size was 2.92 and the average family size was 3.39.

Age distribution was 30.3% under the age of 18, 9.3% from 18 to 24, 26.2% from 25 to 44, 20.5% from 45 to 64, and 13.7% 65 years of age or older. The median age was 33 years. For every 100 females, there were 91.0 males. For every 100 females age 18 and over, there were 85.8 males.

The median household income was $30,365, and the median family income was $34,276. Males had a median income of $32,409 versus $17,101 for females. The per capita income for the city was $13,118. About 17.9% of families and 21.9% of the population were below the poverty line, including 28.4% of those under age 18 and 20.2% of those age 65 or over.

== Economy ==
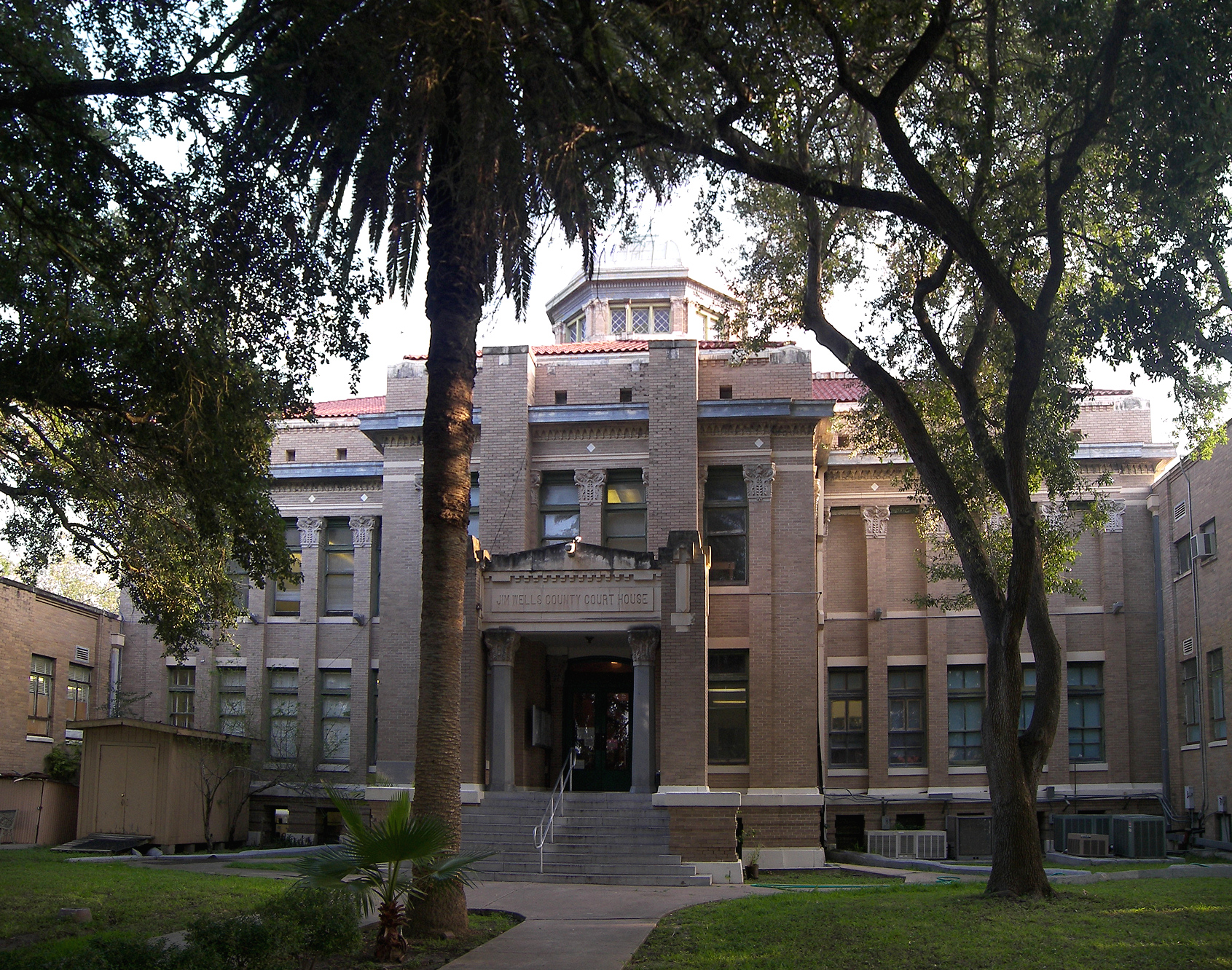
Jim Wells County Courthouse, architect Atlee B. Ayres

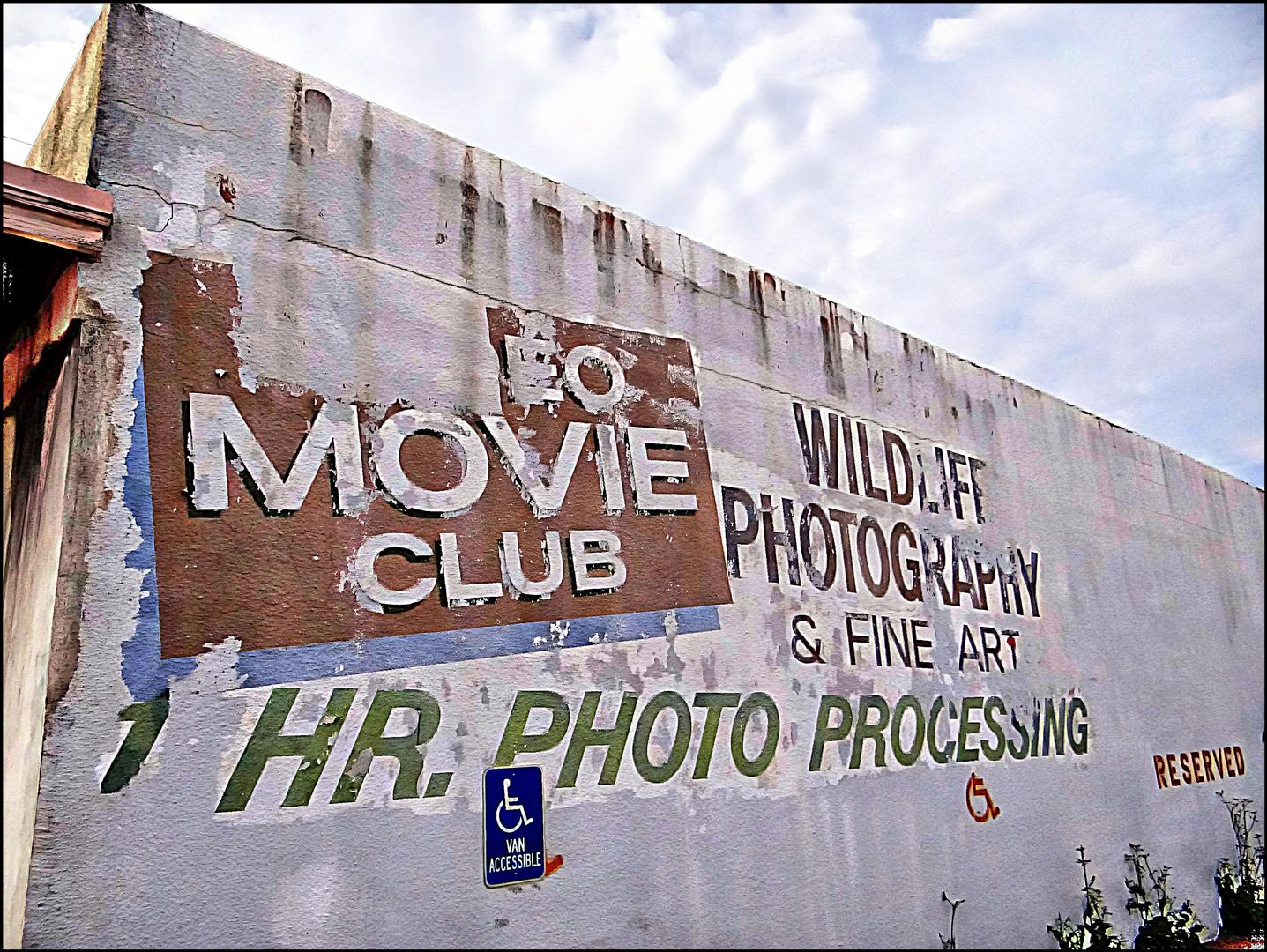
One hour photo in Alice

Today, Alice's economy is centered on the oil industry, with more than 100 different oil field companies located around the Alice area. Alice is called the "Hub City" due to its geographical location between Corpus Christi, McAllen, Laredo, and San Antonio. Its location between these cities makes it an ideal center for distribution.

As of December 2025, Alice had an unemployment rate (Note: The December 2025 unemployment rate of 4.6% is "not seasonly adjusted".) of 4.6%, (compared to 3.9% for Texas).

== Infrastructure ==
=== Transportation ===
==== Highways ====
- U.S. Highway 281
- Interstate 69C – I-69C will be concurrent with U.S. Highway 281.
- State Highway 44
- State Highway 359
- FM 665

==== Air travel ====
- Alice International Airport – general-aviation airport with no scheduled service

==== Railways ====
- Texas Mexican Railway – now owned by Canadian Pacific Kansas City, which connects Monterrey, Mexico, via Laredo, to the Port of Corpus Christi

=== Utilities ===
The City of Alice provides trash and water service for residents.

=== Health care ===
Christus Spohn Hospital is a 138-bed hospital in Alice.

== Education ==
The city is served by the Alice Independent School District.

=== Higher education ===
- Coastal Bend College provides vocational and academic courses for certification or associate degrees. The college also works with local businesses and industry to customize training and education classes for employees.

=== Public ===
- High school – grades 9–12 – Alice High School
- Junior high – grades 6–8 – William Adams Middle School
- Elementary schools – grades K–5 – Dubose, Noonan, Saenz, and Schallert

=== Private ===
- St. Elizabeth School, grades Pre-K3–6
- St. Joseph School, grades PreK3–9 (Now closed)
- Alice Christian School, grades K–12
- Agape House, grades PreK–12
- Alice Migrant Head Start

== Notable people ==
- James P. Allison, immunologist, winner of the 2018 Nobel Prize in Physiology or Medicine, the Lasker Prize, and the Breakthrough Prize for his development of cancer immunotherapy
- Chris Brazzell, Canadian Football League player and ex NFL player, born May 22, 1976, and played on the Alice High School football team: He was drafted to the NFL in 1998 to the New York Jets as the 174th overall pick in the sixth round
- Marv Brown, NFL player with the Detroit Lions in 1957 born August 15, 1930
- Sonny Brown, Houston Oiler, MVP of the 1985 Orange Bowl that earned his team the Oklahoma Sooners a national championship; graduated from Alice High in 1982 where he was 2nd-team all-state quarterback
- Lois Chiles, born April 15, 1947, top 1970s fashion model and actress, most famous for her role as Bond girl Holly Goodhead in Moonraker
- John Donald Wesley Corley (born 1951 and Alice High School graduate of 1969), retired four-star general in the United States Air Force
- Robert F. Curl Jr., Nobel Prize winner, born on August 23, 1933, in Alice; emeritus professor of chemistry at Rice University. He was awarded the Nobel Prize in Chemistry in 1996 for the discovery of fullerene (with the late Richard Smalley, also of Rice University, and Harold Kroto of the University of Sussex)
- J. Frank Dobie, award-winning author who taught at UT Austin, moved to Alice at 16 until he graduated from WAHS
- Bill Henry, Major League Baseball pitcher from 1952 to 1969; played on six clubs including the Houston Astros and Boston Red Sox
- Raymond L. Johnson, mathematician; first African American student admitted to Rice University (PhD, 1969)
- Bill Mason, journalist murdered in 1949 after exposing corruption in local law enforcement
- Ruben Naranjo, born in Alice on February 22, 1945; an accordionist and conjunto band leader of Ruben Naranjo y Los Gamblers, most famous for his songs 'El Preso', 'Preso Sin Delito', and 'El Mundo Es Mio'.
- Richard Raymond, born in Alice on October 27, 1960; Democratic member of the Texas House of Representatives currently representing District 42, which encompasses western Webb County and includes most of the city of Laredo
- Brigadier General Angela Salinas, commanding general of Marine Corps Recruit Depot San Diego: She assumed command on August 4, 2006, becoming the first woman to command the Recruit Depot
- Brothers Jim and Wayne Tyrone, both born in Alice; Major League Baseball outfielders
- Reality Winner (born 1991), American intelligence specialist pled guilty to felony transmission of national defense information.
- David Valdez, photographer who served as the Chief Official White House Photographer

== Outdoor activities ==
Alice and its surrounding areas have an abundance of wildlife, so hunting, fishing, and bird watching are favorite activities, and wild game hunting leases are available through Texas Parks and Wildlife. Golfers have two courses from which to choose in the Hub City, with the Alice Municipal Golf Course being the larger with 18 holes, long fairways, and water hazards. The other is the nine-hole Alice Country Club golf course, east of town.
