= Las Lomitas, Texas =

- Census-designated place (CDP) & Unincorporated community
- Coordinates: 27°20′34″N 98°40′8″W
- Country: United States
- State: Texas
- County: Jim Hogg

Area
  - Total: 3.9 sq mi (10.2 km^{2})
  - Land: 3.9 sq mi (10.2 km^{2})
  - Water: 0 sq mi (0.0 km^{2})
- Elevation: 571 ft (174 m)

Population (2020)
  - Total: 235
  - Density: 59.7/sq mi (23.0/km^{2})
- Time zone: UTC-6 (Central (CST))
  - Summer (DST): UTC-5 (CDT)
- FIPS code: 48-41569
- GNIS feature ID: 1852727

Las Lomitas is an unincorporated community and census-designated place (CDP) in Jim Hogg County, Texas, United States. The population was 235 at the 2020 census.

== Geography ==
Las Lomitas is located in northern Jim Hogg County at 27°20′34″N 98°40′8″W (27.342890, -98.668876). It is bordered to the west by Hebbronville, the county seat, and to the north by Duval County.

Texas State Highway 16 forms the western border of the community and leads north 38 miles (61 km) to Freer and south 2 miles (3 km) to the center of Hebbronville. Texas State Highway 359 forms the southeastern border of Las Lomitas, leading southwestward into Hebbronville and northeastward 25 miles (40 km) to Benavides.

According to the United States Census Bureau, the Las Lomitas CDP has a total area of 3.9 square miles (10.2 km^{2}), all land.

== Demographics ==
Historical population
Census	Pop.	Note	%±
2000	267		—
2010	244		−8.6%
2020	235		−3.7%
U.S. Decennial Census; 1850–1900 1910; 1920 1930 1940; 1950 1960 1970; 1980 1990 2000; 2010 2020

Las Lomitas was first listed as a census designated place in the 2000 U.S. census.

=== 2020 census ===
Las Lomitas CDP, Texas – Racial and ethnic composition Note: the US Census treats Hispanic/Latino as an ethnic category. This table excludes Latinos from the racial categories and assigns them to a separate category. Hispanics/Latinos may be of any race.
Race / Ethnicity (NH = Non-Hispanic)	Pop 2000	Pop 2010	Pop 2020	% 2000	% 2010	% 2020
White alone (NH)	18	6	12	6.74%	2.46%	5.11%
Black or African American alone (NH)	0	0	0	0.00%	0.00%	0.00%
Native American or Alaska Native alone (NH)	0	0	0	0.00%	0.00%	0.00%
Asian alone (NH)	0	0	1	0.00%	0.00%	0.43%
Native Hawaiian or Pacific Islander alone (NH)	0	0	0	0.00%	0.00%	0.00%
Other Race alone (NH)	0	0	0	0.00%	0.00%	0.00%
Mixed race or Multiracial (NH)	0	6	4	0.00%	2.46%	1.70%
Hispanic or Latino (any race)	249	232	218	93.26%	95.08%	92.77%
Total	267	244	235	100.00%	100.00%	100.00%

As of the census of 2000, there were 267 people, 69 households, and 56 families residing in the CDP. The population density was 67.5 inhabitants per square mile (26.1/km^{2}). There were 87 housing units at an average density of 22.0/sq mi (8.5/km^{2}). The racial makeup of the CDP was 69.66% White, 23.97% from other races, and 6.37% from two or more races. Hispanic or Latino of any race were 93.26% of the population.

There were 69 households, out of which 68.1% had children under the age of 18 living with them, 63.8% were married couples living together, 13.0% had a female householder with no husband present, and 17.4% were non-families. 13.0% of all households were made up of individuals, and 2.9% had someone living alone who was 65 years of age or older. The average household size was 3.87 and the average family size was 4.23.

In the CDP, the population was spread out, with 46.1% under the age of 18, 11.6% from 18 to 24, 29.2% from 25 to 44, 10.5% from 45 to 64, and 2.6% who were 65 years of age or older. The median age was 20 years. For every 100 females, there were 108.6 males. For every 100 females age 18 and over, there were 105.7 males.

The median income for a household in the CDP was $30,714, and the median income for a family was $30,714. Males had a median income of $36,875 versus $11,250 for females. The per capita income for the CDP was $7,506. About 28.8% of families and 38.2% of the population were below the poverty line, including 37.4% of those under the age of eighteen and 100.0% of those 65 or over.

== Education ==
Las Lomitas, as with all of Jim Hogg County, is served by the Jim Hogg County Independent School District.

The district has three schools: Hebbronville Elementary School, Hebbronville Junior High School, and Hebbronville High School. All of the schools are considered to be in the Hebbronville community.
