= Guerra, Texas =

- CDP
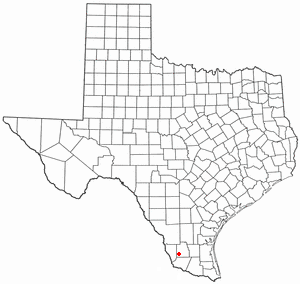
- Location of Guerra, Texas

- Coordinates: 26°52′57″N 98°53′40″W
- Country: United States
- State: Texas
- County: Jim Hogg

Area
  - Total: 0.21 sq mi (0.54 km^{2})
  - Land: 0.21 sq mi (0.54 km^{2})
  - Water: 0 sq mi (0.0 km^{2})
- Elevation: 564 ft (172 m)

Population (2020)
  - Total: 3
  - Density: 14/sq mi (5.6/km^{2})
- Time zone: UTC-6 (Central (CST))
  - Summer (DST): UTC-5 (CDT)
- ZIP code: 78360
- Area code: 956
- FIPS code: 48-31484
- GNIS feature ID: 1337096

Guerra is an unincorporated community and census-designated place (CDP) in Jim Hogg County, Texas, United States. As of the 2020 census, Guerra had a population of 3.

== Geography ==
Guerra is located in southwestern Jim Hogg County at 26°52′57″N 98°53′40″W (26.882615, -98.894466). Farm to Market Road 649 runs through the community, leading north 14 miles (23 km) to Randado and south 35 miles (56 km) to Garceno in the Rio Grande Valley.

According to the United States Census Bureau, the Guerra CDP has a total area of 0.21 square miles (0.54 km^{2}), all land.

== Demographics ==
Historical population
Census	Pop.	Note	%±
2000	8		—
2010	6		−25.0%
2020	3		−50.0%
U.S. Decennial Census; 1850–1900 1910; 1920 1930 1940; 1950 1960 1970; 1980 1990 2000; 2010 2020

Guerra was first listed as a census designated place in the 2000 U.S. census.

=== 2020 census ===
Guerra CDP, Texas – Racial and ethnic composition Note: the US Census treats Hispanic/Latino as an ethnic category. This table excludes Latinos from the racial categories and assigns them to a separate category. Hispanics/Latinos may be of any race.
Race / Ethnicity (NH = Non-Hispanic)	Pop 2000	Pop 2010	Pop 2020	% 2000	% 2010	% 2020
White alone (NH)	2	2	0	25.00%	33.00%	0.00%
Black or African American alone (NH)	0	0	0	0.00%	0.00%	0.00%
Native American or Alaska Native alone (NH)	0	0	0	0.00%	0.00%	0.00%
Asian alone (NH)	0	0	0	0.00%	0.00%	0.00%
Native Hawaiian or Pacific Islander alone (NH)	0	0	0	0.00%	0.00%	0.00%
Other Race alone (NH)	0	0	0	0.00%	0.00%	0.00%
Mixed race or Multiracial (NH)	0	0	0	0.00%	0.00%	0.00%
Hispanic or Latino (any race)	6	4	3	75.00%	66.67%	100.00%
Total	8	6	3	100.00%	100.00%	100.00%

As of the 2000 census, 8 people, 4 households, and 2 families were residing in the CDP. The population density was 1.4 people per square mile (0.5/km^{2}), with 12 housing units at an average density of 2.0/sq mi (0.8/km^{2}). The racial makeup of the CDP was 100.00% White, and therefore no individuals were from other races nor any from two or more races, although 75.00% of the population were Hispanic or Latino (included in the white race category).

Out of a total of 4 households, 25.0% had children under the age of 18 living with them, 50.0% were married couples living together, and 50.0% were non-families. 50.0% of all households were made up of individuals, and 25.0% had someone living alone who was 65 years of age or older. The average household size was 2.00 and the average family size was 3.00.

In the CDP, the population was spread out, with 12.5% under the age of 18, 12.5% from 18 to 24, 25.0% from 25 to 44, 37.5% from 45 to 64, and 12.5% who were 65 years of age or older. The median age was 47 years. For every 100 females, there were 33.3 males. For every 100 females age 18 and over, there were 40.0 males.

The median income for a household in the CDP was US$51,250, and the median income for a family was US$51,250. The per capita income for the CDP was US$15,631. None of the population or families were below the poverty line.

== Education ==
Guerra, as with all of Jim Hogg County, is served by the Jim Hogg County Independent School District.

The district has three schools: Hebbronville Elementary School, Hebbronville Junior High School, and Hebbronville High School. All of the schools are considered to be in the Hebbronville community.
