= South Fork Estates, Texas =

- Census-designated place
- Coordinates: 27°16′2″N 98°43′30″W
- Country: United States
- State: Texas
- County: Jim Hogg

Area
  - Total: 3.4 sq mi (8.7 km^{2})
  - Land: 3.4 sq mi (8.7 km^{2})
  - Water: 0 sq mi (0.0 km^{2})
- Elevation: 607 ft (185 m)

Population (2020)
  - Total: 136
  - Density: 40/sq mi (16/km^{2})
- Time zone: UTC-6 (Central (CST))
  - Summer (DST): UTC-5 (CDT)
- FIPS code: 48-68966
- GNIS feature ID: 1852769

South Fork Estates is a census-designated place (CDP) in Jim Hogg County, Texas, United States. The population was 136 at the 2020 census, a vast increase from 70 at the 2010 census.

== Geography ==
South Fork Estates is located in northern Jim Hogg County at 27°16′2″N 98°43′30″W (27.267222, -98.725038). Texas State Highway 16 runs along the eastern edge of the community, leading north 3 miles (5 km) to Hebbronville, the county seat, and southwest 19 miles (31 km) to Randado.

According to the United States Census Bureau, the South Fork Estates CDP has a total area of 3.4 square miles (8.7 km^{2}), all land.

== Demographics ==
Historical population
Census	Pop.	Note	%±
2000	47		—
2010	70		48.9%
2020	136		94.3%
U.S. Decennial Census; 1850–1900 1910; 1920 1930 1940; 1950 1960 1970; 1980 1990 2000; 2010 2020

South Fork Estates was first listed as a census designated place in the 2000 U.S. census.

=== 2020 census ===
South Fork Estates CDP, Texas – Racial and ethnic composition Note: the US Census treats Hispanic/Latino as an ethnic category. This table excludes Latinos from the racial categories and assigns them to a separate category. Hispanics/Latinos may be of any race.
Race / Ethnicity (NH = Non-Hispanic)	Pop 2000	Pop 2010	Pop 2020	% 2000	% 2010	% 2020
White alone (NH)	10	2	15	21.28%	2.86%	11.03%
Black or African American alone (NH)	0	0	0	0.00%	0.00%	0.00%
Native American or Alaska Native alone (NH)	1	0	0	2.13%	0.00%	0.00%
Asian alone (NH)	0	0	2	0.00%	0.00%	1.47%
Native Hawaiian or Pacific Islander alone (NH)	0	0	0	0.00%	0.00%	0.00%
Other Race alone (NH)	0	0	0	0.00%	0.00%	0.00%
Mixed race or Multiracial (NH)	0	0	0	0.00%	0.00%	0.00%
Hispanic or Latino (any race)	36	68	119	76.60%	97.14%	87.50%
Total	47	70	136	100.00%	100.00%	100.00%

As of the census of 2000, there were 47 people, 15 households, and 10 families residing in the CDP. The population density was 14.0 people per square mile (5.4/km^{2}). There were 21 housing units at an average density of 6.2/sq mi (2.4/km^{2}). The racial makeup of the CDP was 72.34% White, 2.13% Native American, 25.53% from other races. Hispanic or Latino of any race were 76.60% of the population.

There were 15 households, out of which 46.7% had children under the age of 18 living with them, 60.0% were married couples living together, 6.7% had a female householder with no husband present, and 33.3% were non-families. 26.7% of all households were made up of individuals, and 6.7% had someone living alone who was 65 years of age or older. The average household size was 3.13 and the average family size was 4.10.

In the CDP, the population was spread out, with 42.6% under the age of 18, 4.3% from 18 to 24, 29.8% from 25 to 44, 19.1% from 45 to 64, and 4.3% who were 65 years of age or older. The median age was 34 years. For every 100 females, there were 74.1 males. For every 100 females age 18 and over, there were 92.9 males.

The median income for a household in the CDP was $60,139, and the median income for a family was $60,139. Males had a median income of $0 versus $0 for females. The per capita income for the CDP was $14,429. None of the population or families were below the poverty line.

== Education ==
South Fork Estates, as with all of Jim Hogg County, is served by the Jim Hogg County Independent School District.

The district has three schools: Hebbronville Elementary School, Hebbronville Junior High School, and Hebbronville High School. All of the schools are considered to be in the Hebbronville community.
