= Sweden, Texas =

- Ghost town
- Location within the state of Texas
- Coordinates: 27°33′22.20″N 98°28′6.11″W
- Country: United States
- State: Texas
- County: Duval
- Elevation: 62 ft (19 m)
- Time zone: UTC-6 (Central (CST))
  - Summer (DST): UTC-5 (CDT)
- ZIP code: 78341
- Area code: 361

Sweden is a ghost town in Duval County, Texas, United States, located four miles southwest of Benavides off Farm-to-Market Road 359. The post office first opened in 1884, but closed the next year. It reopened in 1907, but closed permanently in 1932. The population peaked at 25 in 1914, but continued to decline until no more citizens resided there. The town's school was consolidated into the Benavides Independent School District in the 1950s.
