= Oscar Carrillo =

American politician

Oscar Carrillo (November 22, 1921 - January 21, 2003) was born in Hebbronville, Texas in Jim Hogg County to David Carrillo (D.C. Chapa) and Emma Pena Carrillo Chapa. Carrillo graduated from Benavides High School and married Evangelina Garcia on March 23, 1941. Together they had ten children. Carrillo was a veteran of the U.S. Army in the second World War and was awarded a Bronze Star for his service. In 1947, at age 26, Carrillo became the youngest Mayor of the City of Benavides. Carrillo was elected as county attorney in 1960 and served for 10 years. Carrillo served three terms as state representative of the 48th district from 1967 and 1973. He is remembered for his role in convincing Texas legislators to approve the Conally-Carrillo Act, which allowed thousands of Texans and low-income students to attend college area universities and is also credited with co-authoring legislation creating the University of Texas at San Antonio. The University of Texas at San Antonio conferred on him the degree of doctor of political science and doctor of laws.
