= George Berham Parr =

American politician (1901–1975)

- Born: March 1, 1901; San Diego, Texas, US
- Died: April 1, 1975 (aged 74); Julian Windmill, 14 miles S.E. of Benavides, Duval County, Texas
- Resting place: Benavides cemetery 27.59221°N 98.41209°W
- Monuments: Duval County Museum displays some artifacts from his life
- Other names: Duke of Duval; El Patrón; Tacuacha (sly possum)
- Education: Texas A&M; University of Texas; Southwestern University; trade school; University of Texas Law School (special student) 1923-
- Occupations: Lawyer, rancher, politician
- Known for: Lyndon Johnson's 1948 benefactor
- Political party: Democrat; Old party (Partido Viejo)
- Opponent: Freedom Party
- Spouse(s): Thelma Duckworth (m. 1923-divorce, remarried late 1930s, div. 1949) Eva
- Children: two daughters one son
- Parent: Elizabeth Parr (née Allen) Archie Parr b. Dec. 25, 1860 d. Oct. 18, 1942

County Judge of Duval County, Texas
- In office 1926–?
- Preceded by: Givens Parr

Sheriff of Duval County, Texas
- In office 1954–?

George Berham Parr (March 1, 1901 – April 1, 1975) was an American politician, who controlled a Democratic political machine that dominated Duval County, Texas and, to a lesser extent, Jim Wells County. He was known as "The Duke of Duval," like his father before him.

== Early life ==
George Berham Parr was born on March 1, 1901, in San Diego, Texas. His father was Archer "Archie" Parr, a prominent local political boss.

== Personal life ==
Parr was a legislative page at the Texas Capitol during one of his father's terms in the Texas Legislature and attended the West Texas Military Academy for four years. He graduated from Corpus Christi High School in 1921, where he played end on the football team that won the South Texas championship. Parr attended a variety of post-secondary educational institutions, each briefly, and without completing a degree. He entered the University of Texas Law School in 1923 as a special student, but again left without taking a degree. Still, in 1926 he passed the bar examination and was admitted to practice. Also that year, George's father appointed him to complete the term of George's brother, Givens Parr, as Duval county judge.

In 1923, George Parr married his high school sweetheart, Thelma Duckworth of Corpus Christi. They divorced and remarried, and divorced again in 1949; Parr subsequently married Eva Perez. He had two daughters.

For a time, Parr and his friends were enthusiastic and accomplished polo players, albeit on cow ponies with western saddles.

== Political machine boss ==
The Parr Machine functioned on bribery, graft, and illegal donations. Political support came from the southernmost counties in Texas. The machine could produce large numbers of votes, both legal and illegal, from the impoverished and uneducated working-class Mexican-Americans. As a result, the county saw its largely marginalized but large numbers of native Texan yeoman farmers slowly disappear leaving the county commission to be controlled by the Parr family and its cronies. While the Parr Machine had always asserted undue influence over the county's affairs, it was not until Archer Parr that its leadership felt safely secure to overwhelm the remaining independent white farmers by appealing directly to county's new Mexican-American majority by offering them jobs (and in some cases cash directly from the county coffers) in exchange for political support.

The alliance between the Parr-controlled commission and the Hispanic populace made the county a bastion of Democratic strength. By 1940, the white educated population had been reduced to a tiny minority amongst a large Mexican-American population. Parr garnered popular support with his charisma, his fluency in Spanish, and Robin Hood tendencies with sharing the Duval County and Benavides Independent School District coffers. After Archer's death, George inherited the Parr political machine, and the populace passed on the name, "El Patrón", to him as they did his father.

When George attended the 1928 Democratic National Convention in Houston along with his father, people already understood him to be heir apparent, not merely his father's driver. There they plotted with Texas State senator Alvin J. Wirtz, Texas state representative Samuel Ealy Johnson, Jr., and the Bexar County machine to defeat four term Republican Congressman Harry M. Wurzbach in the upcoming election. (Johnson's college student son, Lyndon, also attended.) Wurzbach apparently lost the 1928 election, but was eventually seated in the House because of election fraud.

The discovery of oil in Duval County also created ample opportunities for patronage, allowing Parr to amass a small fortune. To this day, the family's network has limited influence in Texas politics giving its patronage to both Democratic beneficiaries. James Albon Mattox, successfully relied on the old Parr network in his run as the Democratic Party nominee for Texas Attorney General, garnering a majority of the vote in the county despite running against a Mexican-American.

== Political crimes and presidential pardon ==
Parr engaged in the graft, bribery and fraud that are often associated with political machines. Along with other large landowners and managers of landed estates owned by prominent Eastern businessmen, Parr helped develop the practice of working illegal aliens and later using them for advancing political interests. More importantly, his own political career included serving as both the Duval County Judge and Sheriff. He also owned the San Diego State Bank, and the famous Dobie Ranch, including the Parr's Los Horcones Ranch. He was also a partner and silent partner of dozens of businesses in South Texas.

He was convicted of tax evasion in 1932, and eventually served nine months in Federal Correctional Institution, El Reno after violating his parole. He applied for a presidential pardon in July 1943; U.S. Attorney General Francis Biddle blocked it in part because Congressman Richard M. Kleberg opposed the pardon. (In 1934 Archie's reelection to the Texas State senate was in doubt and he hoped that building a road to Corpus Christi across the King Ranch, which was owned by the Kleberg family, would save his political career. When their heretofore political ally Robert Kleberg, Richard's brother, refused, George replied in anger. "You're crucifying my father... I'll get you. I'll gut you if it's the last thing I do.") Such a pardon would demonstrate Parr's power to the other political jefes in the Rio Grande valley. After Tom C. Clark replaced Biddle, Johnson helped secure a pardon from U.S. President Harry S. Truman. The pardon, restoring Parr's civil rights, was granted on February 20, 1946.

Parr demonstrated his success at political maneuvering by securing the defeat of Richard Kleberg in the 1944 congressional primary, with Major John E. Lyle, Jr. By this time Parr had total control of the county, soon acquiring the nickname "Duke of Duval County."

== 1948 U.S. Senate election ==
In 1948 Coke R. Stevenson, Lyndon B. Johnson and others ran in Democratic primary election for U.S. Senate. Stevenson and Johnson advanced to a runoff election. For five days after the runoff, Stevenson appeared to hold a 112-vote lead. Then Jim Wells County amended its return, adding 202 additional votes, 200 of which were for Johnson. Johnson won the nomination by 87 votes, tantamount to election in an era when Republicans were not competitive in the South, and prompting the sobriquet "landslide Lyndon."

Most contemporary observers accept that Parr used his influence to affect the Jim Wells County vote totals in Johnson's favor. One probable motivation was that Parr felt obligated to Johnson, who had helped him obtain the 1946 presidential pardon.

Another likely motivation to oppose Stevenson was that in 1944, Parr and Judge Raymond of Webb County had asked Stevenson, then the Governor, to appoint E. James Kazen (a Raymond relative) Laredo district attorney. The commander at Laredo Army Air Force Base argued to the Governor that half his men had venereal disease and that a district attorney connected to the local political machine meant lax enforcement of laws against prostitution, which would adversely affect his force. For the sake of the war effort, Stevenson appointed a different candidate.

== Struggles and demise of political machine ==
In 1950, Parr had become a thorn in the side of Governor Allan Shivers and Attorney General John Ben Shepperd. Federal officials began to investigate the machine. Some 650 indictments were brought forth against machine members, 300 of them at the state level. Parr, however, eluded indictment, and his conviction for fraud was later dismissed. Under the protection of Lyndon Johnson, Parr eluded all attempts to investigate and convict him for fraud, bribery, corruption, racketeering, and murder. Shepperd was a political advisor to Johnson even as he attempted to bring indictments against Parr. The Parr Machine was challenged by the Freedom Party in Alice, Texas, led by Jake Floyd. The Parrs lost control of that district court, an important office the Parr Machine was used to controlling all over South Texas. The botched assassination of Buddy Floyd, Jake's son, mistakenly shot and killed by Mario Sapet, on September 8, 1952, also signaled turbulent times for the Parr Machine.

However, political candidates would from time to time make Parr an object of their reforming campaigns. In 1954 Governor Allen Shivers declared war on the Parr Faction and sent down a team of Texas Rangers and state investigators. Parr was charged with embezzlement but beat the case. The Parr Machine maintained control of Duval and Jim Wells counties despite the legal and political backlash.

With the end of the Johnson administration in 1968, Parr lost his primary political protector. Under advice from Johnson and other prominent figures, he relinquished control of his machine to his nephew Archer III, by the early 1970s. The law finally caught up with Parr in 1974 when he was convicted of income tax evasion and given a ten-year prison term. He was found dead at his ranch on April 1, 1975, after apparently committing suicide. When Parr's machine collapsed soon after his death, Duval County's small Anglo white (but large-landowning) minority attempted to retain control of the county politically but was unable to halt the take-over of the county Democratic party by the now overwhelmingly large Mexican-American population. Nonetheless, the family and its network remains influential so that the county has remained one of the strongest and most consistently Democratic localities in Texas, frequently giving both national and local candidates victories greater than 70 percent.

George's father Archie Parr founded the Dynasty of Duval County. Archer Parr III (1925–2000), né Archer Weller, Archie's grandson and adopted son, was the third Duke of the Duval County Dynasty. Archer Weller Parr was the county judge from 1959 to 1975; he died November 2, 2000, in Alice, Texas.
