= Loma Linda East, Texas =

- Census-designated place
- Coordinates: 27°45′50″N 98°12′2″W
- Country: United States
- State: Texas
- County: Jim Wells

Area
  - Total: 5.15 sq mi (13.33 km^{2})
  - Land: 5.15 sq mi (13.33 km^{2})
  - Water: 0 sq mi (0.0 km^{2})
- Elevation: 295 ft (90 m)

Population (2020)
  - Total: 305
  - Density: 59.3/sq mi (22.9/km^{2})
- Time zone: UTC-6 (Central (CST))
  - Summer (DST): UTC-5 (CDT)
- FIPS code: 48-43462

Loma Linda East is a census-designated place (CDP) in Jim Wells County, Texas, United States. The population was 305 at the 2020 census, up from 254 at the 2010 census.

== Geography ==
Loma Linda East is located in west-central Jim Wells County at 27°45′56″N 98°11′47″W (27.765671, -98.196317). Texas State Highways 44 and 359 form the southern border of the community. The concurrently running highways lead west 2 miles (3 km) to San Diego and east 8 miles (13 km) to Alice, the Jim Wells county seat.

According to the United States Census Bureau, the CDP has a total area of 5.1 square miles (13.3 km^{2}), all land.

== Demographics ==
Historical population
Census	Pop.	Note	%±
2000	214		—
2010	254		18.7%
2020	305		20.1%
U.S. Decennial Census; 1850–1900 1910; 1920 1930 1940; 1950 1960 1970; 1980 1990 2000; 2010 2020

Loma Linda East first appeared as a census designated place in the 2000 U.S. census.

=== 2020 census ===
Loma Linda East CDP, Texas – Racial and ethnic composition Note: the US Census treats Hispanic/Latino as an ethnic category. This table excludes Latinos from the racial categories and assigns them to a separate category. Hispanics/Latinos may be of any race.
Race / Ethnicity (NH = Non-Hispanic)	Pop 2000	Pop 2010	Pop 2020	% 2000	% 2010	% 2020
White alone (NH)	11	14	7	5.14%	5.51%	2.30%
Black or African American alone (NH)	0	0	0	0.00%	0.00%	0.00%
Native American or Alaska Native alone (NH)	0	0	0	0.00%	0.00%	0.00%
Asian alone (NH)	0	0	0	0.00%	0.00%	0.00%
Native Hawaiian or Pacific Islander alone (NH)	0	0	0	0.00%	0.00%	0.00%
Other race alone (NH)	0	0	0	0.00%	0.00%	0.00%
Mixed race or Multiracial (NH)	0	0	18	0.00%	0.00%	5.90%
Hispanic or Latino (any race)	203	240	280	94.86%	94.49%	91.80%
Total	214	254	305	100.00%	100.00%	100.00%

=== 2000 census ===
As of the census of 2000, there were 214 people, 58 households, and 53 families residing in the CDP. The population density was 41.2 inhabitants per square mile (15.9/km^{2}). There were 64 housing units at an average density of 12.3/sq mi (4.8/km^{2}). The racial makeup of the CDP was 49.53% White, 0.47% Pacific Islander, 49.07% from other races, and 0.93% from two or more races. Hispanic or Latino of any race were 94.86% of the population.

There were 58 households, out of which 60.3% had children under the age of 18 living with them, 81.0% were married couples living together, 5.2% had a female householder with no husband present, and 8.6% were non-families. 6.9% of all households were made up of individuals, and 1.7% had someone living alone who was 65 years of age or older. The average household size was 3.69 and the average family size was 3.89.

In the CDP, the population was spread out, with 40.7% under the age of 18, 7.5% from 18 to 24, 32.7% from 25 to 44, 15.4% from 45 to 64, and 3.7% who were 65 years of age or older. The median age was 28 years. For every 100 females, there were 92.8 males. For every 100 females age 18 and over, there were 101.6 males.

The median income for a household in the CDP was $30,278, and the median income for a family was $30,278. Males had a median income of $21,250 versus $0 for females. The per capita income for the CDP was $6,614. About 46.4% of families and 69.2% of the population were below the poverty line, including 100.0% of those under the age of eighteen and none of those 65 or over.

== Education ==
The western part of Loma Linda East is served by the San Diego Independent School District. The eastern part is in the Alice Independent School District. The former operates San Diego High School and the latter operates Alice High School.
