= San Diego High School (Texas) =

Location
- 235 South Tx Highway 359; San Diego, Texas 78384-3499; United States; 27.745521°N 98.248849°W

Information
- School type: Public High School
- Motto: “Vaqueros Dream Big, Work Hard, and Live Right!”
- School district: San Diego Independent School District
- Superintendent: Rodrigo H. Pena
- Principal: Leila L. Garcia
- Staff: 30.12 (FTE)
- Grades: 9-12
- Enrollment: 455 (2023-2024)
- Student to teacher ratio: 15.11
- Colors: Royal blue & old gold
- Athletics: Baseball, Basketball, Cross Country, Football, Golf, Powerlifting, Swim, Softball, Tennis, Track and Field, Volleyball
- Athletics conference: UIL Class AAA
- Mascot: Vaquero
- Yearbook: El Rodeo
- Website: sdhs.sdisd.us

San Diego High School is a public high school located in San Diego, Texas, United States. It is part of the San Diego Independent School District located in east central Duval County. In 2015, the school was rated "Met Standard" by the Texas Education Agency.

In addition to San Diego, the school district, of which San Diego HS is its sole comprehensive high school, serves the western part of Loma Linda East. (Springfield Unincorporated Area). (Gonzalitoz Unincorporated Area). (Toro Ranch Road Unincorporated Area). (La Rosita Unincorporated Area).

== Clubs and extra-curriculars ==
- FCCLA
- Future Farmers of America (FFA)
- Health Care Occupation Students of America (HOSA)
- National Honor Society (NHS)
- University Interscholastic League (UIL|TFA)
- Art Club
- Cheerleaders
- Colorguard
- Mariachi Azul y Oro
- Mighty Fighting Vaquero Band
- Student Council
- One Act Play
- El Rodeo Yearbook
- JROTC
- Floral
- Spanish Club
- Robotics
- [FCA] (Fellowship of Christian Athletes)
- Criminal Justice League
- Choir
- [Dancing Dolls] (Drill|Dance Team)
- Vaquero Interact Club
- Destination Imagination (DI)
- Vaquero Speech & Debate
