= Altavista, Texas =

Ghost town in Texas, US

- Ghost town
- Location in Texas
- Coordinates: 27.04171320°N 98.52807170°W
- Country: United States
- State: Texas
- County: Jim Hogg

Altavista is a ghost town in Jim Hogg County, Texas, United States. Situated on Farm to Market Road 1017, it was settled in 1890, by the Jones family. A post office opened by 1906, closing at an unknown date. At its peak in 1936, it had a population of 25. It declined from then, being abandoned by the 1990s.
