= Sejita, Texas =

Unincorporated community in Texas, US

Coordinates: 27°18′13″N 98°26′23″W

Sejita is an unincorporated community in southern Duval County, Texas, United States.

The Ramirez Common School District serves area students in grades pre-kindergarten through six. Students in grades seven through twelve attend Benavides Secondary School in nearby Benavides.
