= Crestonio, Texas =

Coordinates: 27.3617°N 98.5986°W

Crestonio is a ghost town in Duval County, Texas, United States, located twenty miles southwest of Benavides. It was a stop on the Texas Mexican Railway. The community stopped appearing on maps during the 1970s.
