= Ramirez Common School District =

School district in Texas, United States

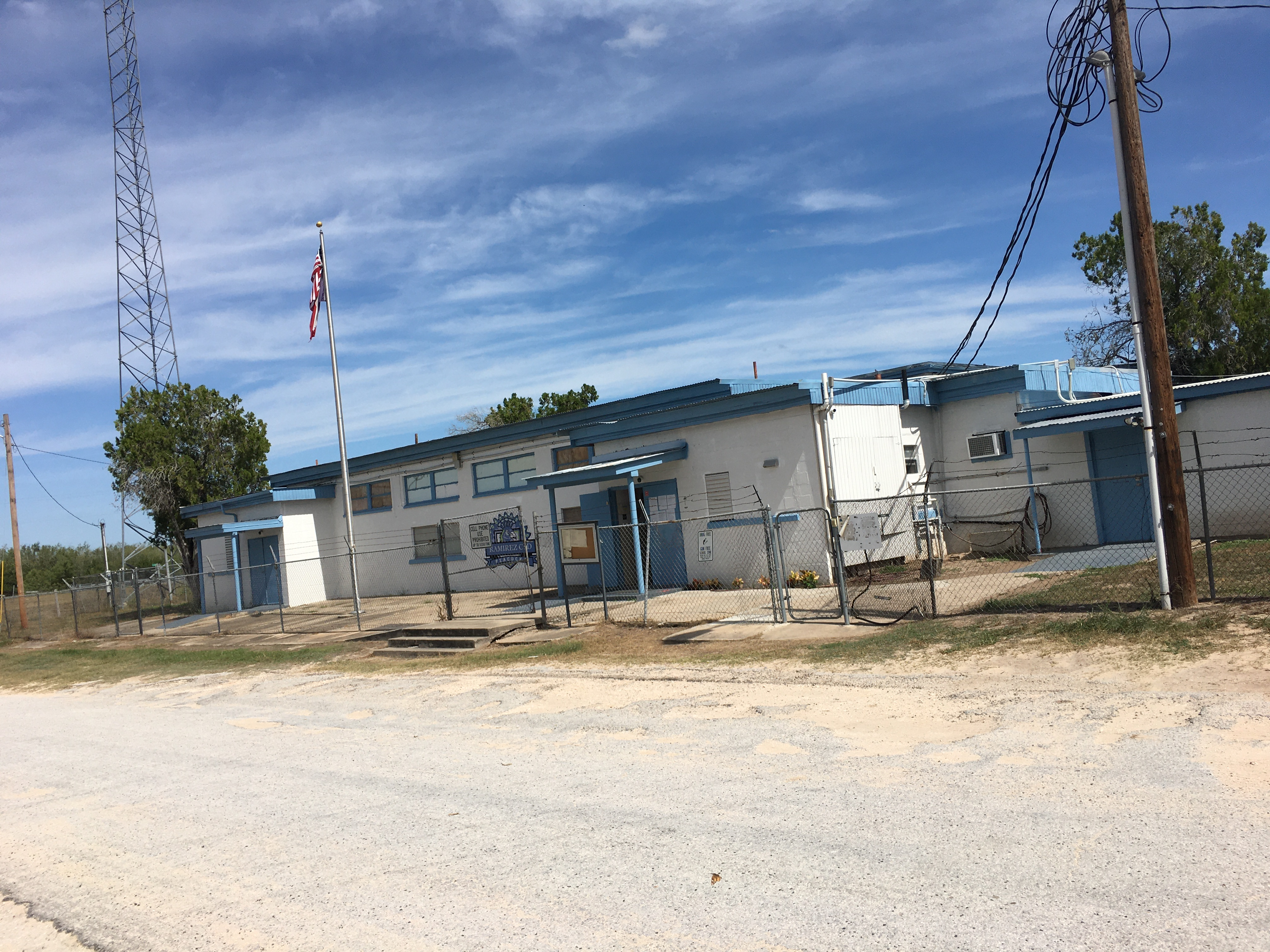

Address
- 10492 School Street Realitos, Texas, 78376; United States

District information
- Grades: PK–6
- Schools: 1
- NCES District ID: 4836420

Students and staff
- Students: 22 (2023–2024)
- Teachers: 4.00 (on an FTE basis)
- Student–teacher ratio: 5.50:1

Other information
- Website: www.ramirezcsd.net

Ramirez Common School District is a public school district in southern Duval County, Texas (USA).

The district serves the unincorporated communities of Ramirez and Sejita.

Ramirez CSD has one school, Ramirez Elementary, which serves students in grades pre-kindergarten through six. Students in grades seven through twelve attend Benavides Secondary School (operated by the Benavides Independent School District) in nearby Benavides.

In 2009, the school district was rated "recognized" by the Texas Education Agency.
