= Texas State Highway 339 =

State highway in Texas

State Highway 339
- SH 339, highlighted in red

Route information
- Maintained by TxDOT
- Length: 45.438 mi (73.125 km)
- Existed: by 1941–present

Major junctions
- South end: SH 285 between Falfurrias and Hebbronville
- SH 359 in Benavides
- North end: SH 16 near Freer

Location
- Country: United States
- State: Texas

Highway system
- Highways in Texas; Interstate; US; State; Former; Toll; Loops; Spurs; FM/RM; Park; Rec
← SH 338	→ SH 340

State Highway 339 (SH 339) is a state highway that runs from just south of Freer in southern Texas southeast and south to a point midway between Falfurrias and Hebbronville.

== History ==
The route was originally designated on January 14, 1941, as the part of the highway from Freer to a point approximately ten miles south of Benavides. On December 1, 1953, FM 1345 was signed as SH 339. A short portion of the route, less than a mile of the road south of Benavides, was cancelled from the designation on October 25, 1954. On August 29, 1990, the highway assumed its present configuration with the southward extension to SH 285, transferred from Farm to Market Road 1345.

== Route description ==
Beginning at a junction with SH 16 south of Freer in Duval County, SH 339 runs southeast to a junction with SH 359 at Benavides. In Benavides the highway is known by three different names: West Avenue north of the junction with SH 359, Main Street for the brief co-routing with SH 359, and Humble Street south of SH 359. The highway then proceeds almost directly south to its final junction with SH 285 midway between Falfurrias and Hebbronville. Most of the terrain covered by the highway is sparsely populated ranch country. SH 339 is completely contained in Duval County.

== Junction list ==
The entire route is in Duval County.

Location	mi	km	Destinations	Notes
			SH 285	
			FM 3249 west	
			FM 716	
Benavides			SH 359 east / FM 2295 east (Main Street) / FM 3196 north (Humble Street)	Southern terminus of SH 359/FM 2295 concurrency
Benavides			SH 359 west / FM 2295 west (Main Street)	Northern terminus of SH 359/FM 2295 concurrency
			SH 16	
1.000 mi = 1.609 km; 1.000 km = 0.621 mi: Concurrency terminus
