= Agua Nueva, Texas =

Unincorporated community in Texas, US

Coordinates: 26°54′06″N 98°36′01″W

Agua Nueva (Spanish: "new water", /ɑːwənjuˈeɪvə/ ah-wə-new-AY-və) is an unincorporated community in Jim Hogg County, Texas, United States. It is located along FM 1017 in southeastern Jim Hogg County, approximately 35 miles south of Hebbronville. According to the Handbook of Texas, the community had an estimated population of 20 in 2000.

== Etymology ==
The origin of the community's name is disputed; while it was most likely named for the Agua Nueva de Abajo land grant, it may have been named for a spring in the area.
