= Ramirez, Texas =

Unincorporated community in Texas, US

Coordinates: 27°20′44″N 98°24′35″W

Ramirez is an unincorporated community in southern Duval County, Texas, United States.

The Ramirez Common School District serves area students in grades pre-kindergarten through six. Students in grades seven through twelve attend Benavides Secondary School in nearby Benavides.
