= San Diego Independent School District =

School district in Texas, United States

Address
- 609 West Labbe Avenue San Diego, Texas, 78384; United States

District information
- Grades: PK–12
- Schools: 3
- NCES District ID: 4838820

Students and staff
- Students: 1,513 (2023–2024)
- Teachers: 104.15 (on an FTE basis)
- Student–teacher ratio: 14.53:1

Other information
- Website: www.sdisd.us

San Diego Independent School District is a public school district based in San Diego, Texas, United States.

Located in Duval County, a small portion of the district extends into Jim Wells County. The portion in Jim Wells County includes the western part of Loma Linda East.

In 2009, the school district was rated "academically acceptable" by the Texas Education Agency.

== Schools ==
- San Diego High School (Grades 9-12)
- Bernarda Jaime Junior High School (Grades 6-8)
- Archie Parr Elementary School (Grades 3-5) (CLOSED)
- Anna Norman Collins Primary School (Grades PK-2) (CLOSED)
  - Now formally merged - Collins Parr Elementary School (Grades PK-5)
