= Seven Sisters, Texas =

Unincorporated community in Texas, US

Coordinates: 28°00′48″N 98°32′21″W

Seven Sisters is an unincorporated community in northern Duval County, Texas, United States.

The community is located near the McMullen county line on Farm Road 2359, and was named for the Seven Sisters oilfield.
