= Archie Parr =

American politician (1860 or 1859–1942)

Member of the Texas Senate from the 23rd district
- In office January 1915 – 1934

Duval County Commissioner
- In office 1908 – 1914 or earlier
- In office 1896–1906

Personal details
- Born: December 25, 1860 (some sources say 1859) Matagorda Island in Calhoun County, Texas
- Died: October 18, 1942 (aged 81) Corpus Christi, Texas
- Resting place: Benavides Cemetery; 27.59221°N 98.41209°W
- Party: Democrat; El Guarache (the sandal, vs. La Bota the boot); later the Old Party (Partido Viejo)
- Spouse(s): Elizabeth "Lizzie" Allen, m. 1891
- Children: Givens Parr; Marie Parr; Elizabeth Parr; George Berham Parr
- Parent: George Berham Parr (1829–1867) Sarah Pamela (Givens) Parr (1837-1918)
- Education: third grade

Archer "Archie" Parr (December 25, 1860 or 1859 – October 18, 1942), was a Texas cattle rancher and politician, who was nicknamed "the Duke of Duval County", where he was the local Democratic Party political boss. Beginning in 1914, Parr was elected to the Texas State Senate for numerous consecutive terms, serving nearly two decades, from 1915 to 1934. He had previously been elected as county commissioner, serving for a decade after repeated re-election. He amassed a great fortune through his career.

Anglo in ancestry, Parr spoke Spanish and acted as a patron, developing a power base among the Mexican Americans who constituted the majority of residents in the county. He retained their favor by supporting his constituents, showing sensitivity to their customs, and sometimes making cash payments. Parr controlled the party machine in the county. By his death in 1942, his son, George Parr, had taken it over, keeping control until 1975.

== Biography ==
=== Early life, marriage and work ===
Archer "Archie" Parr was born on Matagorda Island in Calhoun County, Texas, in 1860 to George Berham and Sarah Pamela (Givens) Parr. He had a younger sister, and they were children when their father died. George Parr had been a veteran of Zachary Taylor's forces during the Mexican War of 1846. As a boy, Archie Parr left school in third grade to work to help his family. They were also helped by Sarah's brother, John S. Givens. The boy Parr wrangled horses at 11, was a drover at 14, and at 17 was a trail boss on a Chisholm Trail cattle drive. He worked as a school teacher in Rockport.

In 1882 Parr went to Duval County, where he worked as a manager on the Sweden Ranch near Benavides, Texas. Social life there included euchre, dancing, and croquet. He soon bought his ranch there.

In 1891, at the age of 31, he married Elizabeth Allen in Huntsville, Texas. She was a student at Sam Houston State Teachers College. From Allendale, she was five years younger than he.

They had a family of five children, including sons Givens Parr, who attended Yale University and served two terms as a county judge, but mostly concentrated on ranching; and George Parr, who followed his father into politics and inherited his party machine. In 1927 the couple adopted one of their grandchildren. The children grew up speaking both English and Spanish. George preferred Spanish, and used it to discuss state and local politics with his father.

=== Political career ===
As a rancher, Parr learned Spanish and began to appreciate Mexican Americans as potential political supporters. They constituted a majority of the population in the county but had been largely ignored by the Anglo elite. Parr treated his workers in the manner of a patron, helping the people and their families, giving favors and looking out for them. He established a system of paternalism.

Parr was first elected to political office in 1896, when he won the office of county commissioner; he was re-elected repeatedly, serving in that position until 1906.

In 1901, the state legislature imposed a poll tax, which effectively disfranchised most blacks and many poor whites, effectively ending the competition from the Republican and Populist parties in Texas. Throughout most of the state, the Democratic Party became dominant, and competitive elections were effectively held only at the primary level.

In 1907, John D. Cleary, the county tax assessor, was killed with buckshot in the back. He had "engineered a Democratic sweep of the county elections of 1906." Texas Rangers investigated unsuccessfully. Parr fell under their suspicion because Cleary had been his main political opponent. With Cleary's death, Parr took over the party machinery in the county. In 1908 Parr established his party, which he called El Guarache (sandal [the poor]), as opposed to La Bota (boot [the rich, both Democrat and Republican]).

He built up his power among Mexican Americans and sometimes resorted to fraud and coercion to control elections. Techniques included marked ballots, armed guards appointed by Parr who patrolled the polling places to intimidate voters, and alter election returns if needed. "Parr's minions knew how to stuff a ballot box."

Parr was first elected to the Texas State Senate in 1914, having won the Democratic primary; he won re-election for numerous terms, serving in the office for nearly two decades, from 1915 to 1934. With his seniority and power, he became allied with the Democrats' patronage system in the state, and powerful party officials based in San Antonio, who managed much of the party patronage. He amassed a great personal fortune over the years.

In 1928 Parr and the Democratic Party tried to defeat Congressman Harry M. Wurzbach, the only Republican elected to Congress from Texas in this period. He had won consecutive terms since 1920 from the 14th congressional district, which included Guadalupe County where German Americans had supported the Republican. The Democratic candidate won the election, but Wurzbach contested it at Congress for irregularities. The committee found in his favor, and he was seated in 1930. That year, Wurzbach won re-election to Congress, and died the next year in office.

In 1934, Parr lost in the Democratic primary for reelection to the Texas Senate. An IRS civil suit for unpaid income tax represented him as a tax cheat. He had hoped that launching a road project with a quicker route to Corpus Christi, Texas, would help him win reelection. That road had to cross the King Ranch. His former friend and Democratic political ally, Congressman Richard M. Kleberg, opposed construction of the road across the ranch.

=== Legacy and honors ===
- Parr's power was recognized in his nickname of "Duke of Duval County".
- His son, George Parr, followed him into Texas politics and, by his father's death in 1942, already controlled the county political machine that "dominated Duval County until 1975." He was elected to the state senate. Bitter about Kleberg's failure to support his father in 1934, in 1942 George Parr contrived the defeat of Kleberg in the Democratic primary.
