= Randado, Texas =

Unincorporated community in Texas, US

Coordinates: 27°04′50″N 98°52′42″W

Randado is an unincorporated community in Jim Hogg County, Texas, United States. It is located at the junction of State Highway 16 and FM 649 in west central Jim Hogg County, approximately 25 miles southwest of Hebbronville. According to the Handbook of Texas, the community had an estimated population of 15 in 2000.
