= Benavides, Texas =

- City
- Interactive map of Benavides, Texas
- Coordinates: 27°35′48″N 98°24′43″W
- Country: United States
- State: Texas
- County: Duval

Area
  - Total: 1.77 sq mi (4.59 km^{2})
  - Land: 1.77 sq mi (4.59 km^{2})
  - Water: 0 sq mi (0.00 km^{2})
- Elevation: 374 ft (114 m)

Population (2020)
  - Total: 1,183
  - Density: 668/sq mi (258/km^{2})
- Time zone: UTC-6 (Central (CST))
  - Summer (DST): UTC-5 (CDT)
- ZIP code: 78341
- Area code: 361
- FIPS code: 48-07528
- GNIS feature ID: 1330408
- Website: https://cityofbenavides.org/

Benavides (/ˌbɛnəˈviːdəs/ BEN-ə-VEE-dəs) is a city in Duval County, Texas, United States. The population was 1,183 at the 2020 census.

== History ==
The town is named after Plácido Benavides (1837–1919), namesake nephew of Plácido Benavides (1810–1837), Tejano 1832 alcalde of Victoria, who served under Stephen F. Austin with Juan Seguin, in the Siege of Béxar.

Plácido Benavides whom the town is named after served in the Confederate States Army. After the war, he built his "Rancho Palo Alto" into one of the largest ranches in Duval County. In 1880, he agreed to let the county locate a railroad station on his property. In 1881, he donated 80 acres (32 ha) to establish the community that grew up around the station on the Texas Mexican Railway.

In 1882, Archie Parr arrived to manage the Sweden Ranch for the Lott & Nielson Pasture Company. The former schoolteacher and ranch hand later became a rancher, Texas state senator, and the first "Duke of Duval", political boss of the county. His middle son, George Berham Parr, succeeded him as El Patrón and Duke of Duval. Other descendants of Archie also figured prominently in county politics. In 1911, Archie campaigned unsuccessfully to move the county courthouse from San Diego to Benavides.

== Geography ==
Benavides is located southeast of the center of Duval County at 27°35′48″N 98°24′43″W (27.596677, –98.411884), in the valley of Santa Gertrudis Creek. Texas State Highway 359 runs through the city, leading northeastward 15 miles (24 km) to San Diego, the county seat, and southwestward 27 miles (43 km) to Hebbronville. Texas State Highway 339 also passes through Benavides, leading northwestward 24 miles (39 km) to Freer, and south 25 miles (40 km) to its terminus at TX 285.

According to the United States Census Bureau, Benavides has a total area of 1.8 square miles (4.7 km^{2}), all land.

== Demographics ==
Historical population
Census	Pop.	Note	%±
1890	1,424		—
1940	3,081		—
1950	3,016		−2.1%
1960	2,459		−18.5%
1970	1,841		−25.1%
1980	1,978		7.4%
1990	1,788		−9.6%
2000	1,686		−5.7%
2010	1,362		−19.2%
2020	1,183		−13.1%
U.S. Decennial Census

=== 2020 census ===
As of the 2020 census, Benavides had a population of 1,183. The median age was 46.0 years. 20.9% of residents were under the age of 18 and 23.4% of residents were 65 years of age or older. For every 100 females there were 89.9 males, and for every 100 females age 18 and over there were 91.0 males age 18 and over.

0% of residents lived in urban areas, while 100.0% lived in rural areas.

There were 511 households in Benavides, of which 29.5% had children under the age of 18 living in them. Of all households, 41.7% were married-couple households, 21.1% were households with a male householder and no spouse or partner present, and 32.5% were households with a female householder and no spouse or partner present. About 32.2% of all households were made up of individuals and 16.5% had someone living alone who was 65 years of age or older.

There were 676 housing units, of which 24.4% were vacant. Among occupied housing units, 74.4% were owner-occupied and 25.6% were renter-occupied. The homeowner vacancy rate was 0.8% and the rental vacancy rate was 11.9%.

Racial composition as of the 2020 census
Race	Percent
White	47.6%
Black or African American	0.1%
American Indian and Alaska Native	0.1%
Asian	0.3%
Native Hawaiian and Other Pacific Islander	0%
Some other race	12.3%
Two or more races	39.6%
Hispanic or Latino (of any race)	95.1%

=== 2000 census ===
As of the census of 2000, there were 1,686 people, 625 households, and 444 families residing in the city. The population density was 934.0 inhabitants per square mile (360.6/km^{2}). There were 776 housing units at an average density of 429.9 per square mile (166.0/km^{2}). The racial makeup of the city was 83.57% White, 0.06% African American, 0.30% Native American, 0.06% Asian, 13.82% from other races, and 2.19% from two or more races. Hispanic or Latino of any race were 95.55% of the population.

There were 625 households, out of which 30.7% had children under the age of 18 living with them, 50.2% were married couples living together, 16.8% had a female householder with no husband present, and 28.8% were non-families. 26.7% of all households were made up of individuals, and 15.8% had someone living alone who was 65 years of age or older. The average household size was 2.70 and the average family size was 3.28.

In the city, the population was spread out, with 26.1% under the age of 18, 8.7% from 18 to 24, 26.0% from 25 to 44, 20.5% from 45 to 64, and 18.7% who were 65 years of age or older. The median age was 38 years. For every 100 females, there were 92.7 males. For every 100 females age 18 and over, there were 88.8 males.

The median income for a household in the city was $21,513, and the median income for a family was $27,059. Males had a median income of $26,250 versus $15,481 for females. The per capita income for the city was $11,332. About 25.1% of families and 28.7% of the population were below the poverty line, including 31.2% of those under age 18 and 32.5% of those age 65 or over.

== Education ==
The city of Benavides is served by the Benavides Independent School District.

== Climate ==
The climate in this area is characterized by hot, humid summers and generally mild to cool winters. According to the Köppen Climate Classification system, Benavides has a humid subtropical climate, abbreviated "Cfa" on climate maps.

== Notable person ==
- Oscar Carrillo, youngest ever mayor of Benavides and three-term member of the Texas House of Representatives
