= Texas State Highway 285 =

State highway in Texas

State Highway 285
- SH 285, highlighted in red

Route information
- Maintained by TxDOT
- Length: 56.866 mi (91.517 km)
- Existed: by 1939–present

Major junctions
- West end: SH 16 at Hebbronville
- SH 339 east of Hebbronville; Future I-69C / US 281 at Falfurrias
- East end: Bus. US 77 at Riviera

Location
- Country: United States
- State: Texas

Highway system
- Highways in Texas; Interstate; US; State; Former; Toll; Loops; Spurs; FM/RM; Park; Rec
← US 285	→ SH 286

State Highway 285 (SH 285) is a state highway that runs from Riviera in southern Texas, near Corpus Christi, west to Hebbronville.

== Route description ==
Beginning at a junction with US 77 (Future I-69E) at Riviera in Kleberg County, SH 285 runs southwest and west to a junction with US 281 (Future I-69C) at Falfurrias in Brooks County. In Riviera the highway is known as Olive Avenue; in Falfurrias it is known as Rice Street. SH 285 continues northwest and west to a junction with SH 339 and then to its final junction with SH 16 at Hebbronville in Jim Hogg County, where the route is known as Fal Street. SH 285 was designated on March 31, 1939, from Falfurrias to Hebbronville. On September 26, 1939 as part of a general redescription of the state highway system, SH 285 was extended east to its current end, replacing a part of SH 16. Most of the terrain covered by SH 285 is lightly populated ranch and oil country.

== Junction list ==
County	Location	mi	km	Destinations	Notes
Jim Hogg		0.000	0.000	SH 16	
Jim Hogg				FM 1017	
Brooks				SH 339	
Brooks				FM 1329	
Brooks				FM 1538	
Brooks				FM 754	
Brooks	Falfurrias			Bus. US 281	
Brooks	Falfurrias			US 281 / Future I-69C	U.S. 281 is the future Interstate 69C
Brooks				FM 1418	
Brooks				FM 2191	
Kleberg		56.866	91.517	US 77 / Future I-69E	U.S. 77 is the future Interstate 69E; US 77 will be renamed to US 77 Bus. (Riviera, Texas) when the Riviera Bypass is under construction / completed.
1.000 mi = 1.609 km; 1.000 km = 0.621 mi
