= Jim Hogg County, Texas =

County in Texas, United States

- County
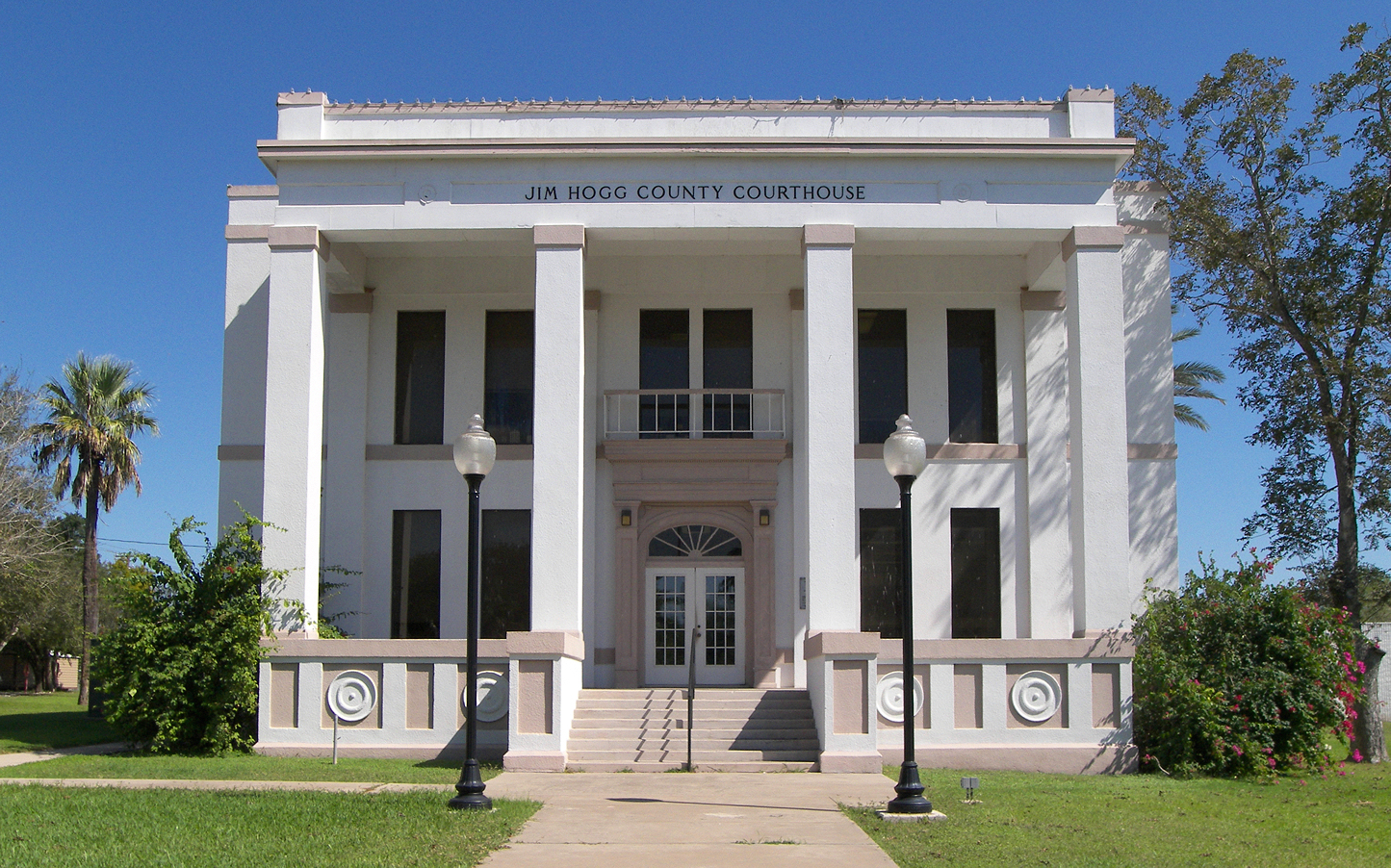
- The Jim Hogg County Courthouse in Hebbronville

- Location within the U.S. state of Texas
- Coordinates: 27°03′N 98°41′W
- Country: United States
- State: Texas
- Founded: 1913
- Named for: James Stephen Hogg
- Seat: Hebbronville
- Largest community: Hebbronville

Area
  - Total: 1,136 sq mi (2,940 km^{2})
  - Land: 1,136 sq mi (2,940 km^{2})
  - Water: 0.04 sq mi (0.10 km^{2}) 0%

Population (2020)
  - Total: 4,838
  - Estimate (2025): 4,555 ▼
  - Density: 4.259/sq mi (1.644/km^{2})
- Time zone: UTC−6 (Central)
  - Summer (DST): UTC−5 (CDT)
- Congressional district: 28th
- Website: www.co.jim-hogg.tx.us

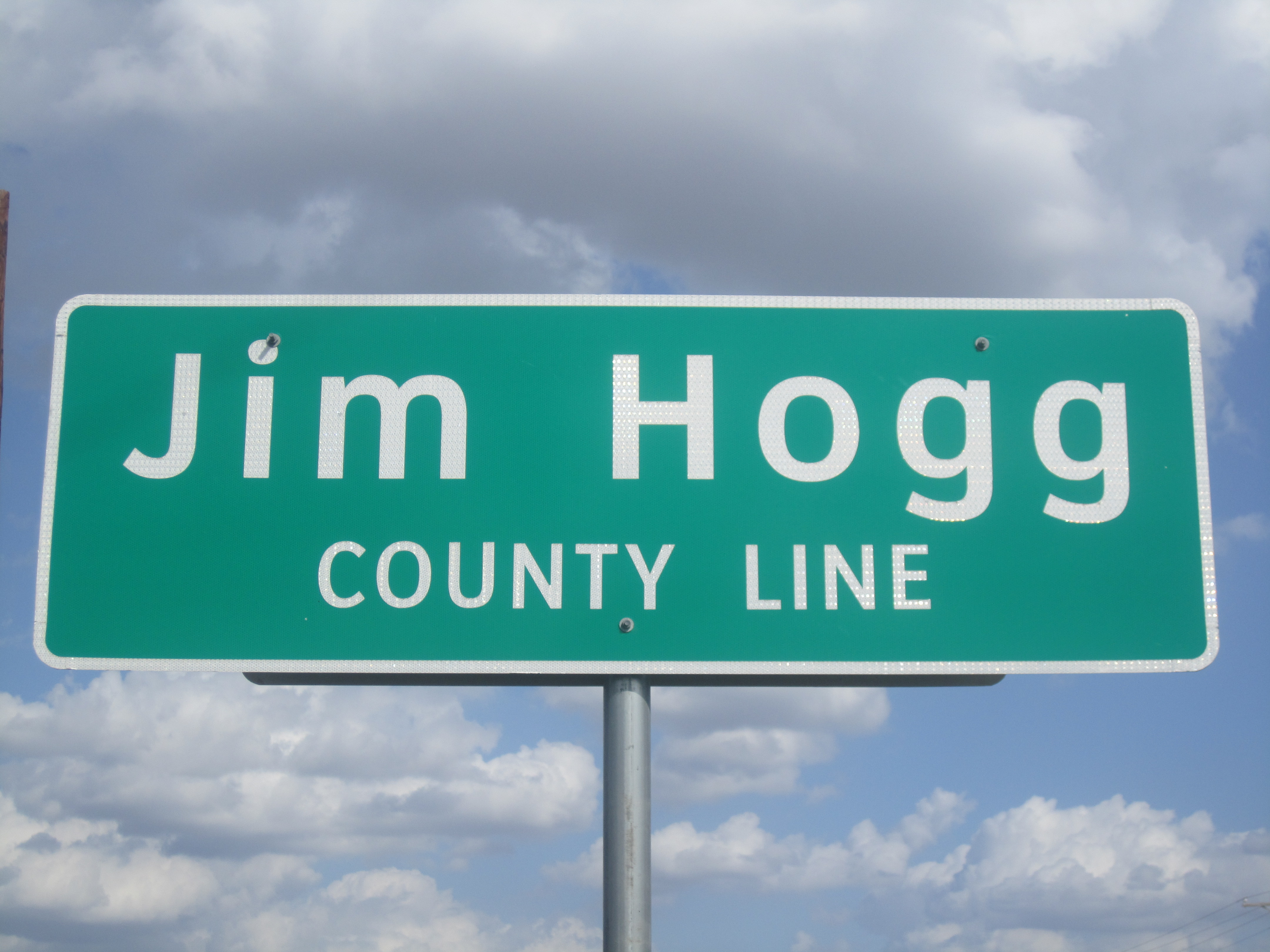

Jim Hogg County is a county located in the U.S. state of Texas. As of the 2020 census, the population was 4,838. Its county seat is Hebbronville. The county is named for James Stephen Hogg, the governor of Texas from 1891 to 1895.

== History ==
Jim Hogg County was formed in 1913 from portions of Brooks and Duval counties. It was named after Jim Hogg, the 20th Governor of Texas, and the first governor born in the state of Texas.

== Geography ==
According to the U.S. Census Bureau, the county has a total area of 1,136 square miles (2,940 km^{2}), virtually all of which is land.

=== Major highways ===
- State Highway 16
- State Highway 285
- State Highway 359
- Farm to Market Road 1017

=== Adjacent counties ===
- Duval County (north)
- Brooks County (east)
- Starr County (south)
- Zapata County (west)
- Webb County (northwest)

== Demographics ==
Historical population
Census	Pop.	Note	%±
1920	1,914		—
1930	4,919		157.0%
1940	5,449		10.8%
1950	5,389		−1.1%
1960	5,022		−6.8%
1970	4,654		−7.3%
1980	5,168		11.0%
1990	5,109		−1.1%
2000	5,281		3.4%
2010	5,300		0.4%
2020	4,838		−8.7%
2025 (est.)	4,555	▼	−5.8%
U.S. Decennial Census; 1850–2010 2010–2014

=== Racial and ethnic composition ===
Jim Hogg County, Texas – Racial and ethnic composition Note: the US Census treats Hispanic/Latino as an ethnic category. This table excludes Latinos from the racial categories and assigns them to a separate category. Hispanics/Latinos may be of any race.
Race / ethnicity (NH = Non-Hispanic)	Pop 1980	Pop 1990	Pop 2000	Pop 2010	Pop 2020	% 1980	% 1990	% 2000	% 2010	% 2020
White alone (NH)	486	424	474	334	414	9.40%	8.30%	8.98%	6.30%	8.56%
Black or African American alone (NH)	0	3	22	18	5	0.00%	0.06%	0.42%	0.34%	0.10%
Native American or Alaska Native alone (NH)	0	7	19	14	15	0.00%	0.14%	0.36%	0.26%	0.31%
Asian alone (NH)	1	3	5	14	26	0.02%	0.06%	0.09%	0.26%	0.54%
Native Hawaiian or Pacific Islander alone (NH)	x	x	0	0	5	x	x	0.00%	0.00%	0.10%
Other race alone (NH)	2	13	0	0	8	0.04%	0.25%	0.00%	0.00%	0.17%
Mixed race or Multiracial (NH)	x	x	9	13	84	x	x	0.17%	0.25%	1.74%
Hispanic or Latino (any race)	4,679	4,659	4,752	4,907	4,281	90.54%	91.19%	89.98%	92.58%	88.49%
Total	5,168	5,109	5,281	5,300	4,838	100.00%	100.00%	100.00%	100.00%	100.00%

=== 2020 census ===
As of the 2020 census, the county had a population of 4,838 and 1,111 families. The median age was 38.2 years, 27.3% of residents were under the age of 18, and 18.7% were 65 years of age or older; for every 100 females there were 94.8 males and for every 100 females age 18 and over there were 91.9 males.

The racial makeup of the county was 48.2% White, 0.1% Black or African American, 0.6% American Indian and Alaska Native, 0.5% Asian, 0.1% Native Hawaiian and Pacific Islander, 13.7% from some other race, and 36.7% from two or more races. Hispanic or Latino residents of any race comprised 88.5% of the population.

<0.1% of residents lived in urban areas, while 100.0% lived in rural areas.

There were 1,712 households in the county, of which 38.0% had children under the age of 18 living in them. Of all households, 42.9% were married-couple households, 19.0% were households with a male householder and no spouse or partner present, and 31.4% were households with a female householder and no spouse or partner present. About 25.9% of all households were made up of individuals and 11.4% had someone living alone who was 65 years of age or older.

There were 2,242 housing units, of which 23.6% were vacant. Among occupied housing units, 71.8% were owner-occupied and 28.2% were renter-occupied. The homeowner vacancy rate was 4.3% and the rental vacancy rate was 13.5%.

=== 2000 census ===
As of the 2000 census, there were 5,281 people, 1,815 households, and 1,359 families residing in the county. The population density was 5 people per square mile (1.9 people/km^{2}). There were 2,308 housing units at an average density of 2 units per square mile (0.77/km^{2}). The racial makeup of the county was 80.44% White, 0.45% Black or African American, 0.78% Native American, 0.21% Asian, 15.83% from other races, and 2.29% from two or more races. 89.98% of the population were Hispanic or Latino of any race.

There were 1,815 households, out of which 38.50% had children under the age of 18 living with them, 55.20% were married couples living together, 14.60% had a female householder with no husband present, and 25.10% were non-families. 23.40% of all households were made up of individuals, and 12.30% had someone living alone who was 65 years of age or older. The average household size was 2.89 and the average family size was 3.43.

In the county, the population was spread out, with 31.60% under the age of 18, 8.10% from 18 to 24, 24.60% from 25 to 44, 21.10% from 45 to 64, and 14.60% who were 65 years of age or older. The median age was 34 years. For every 100 females there were 96.70 males. For every 100 females age 18 and over, there were 92.10 males.

The median income for a household in the county was $25,833, and the median income for a family was $29,844. Males had a median income of $28,150 versus $18,750 for females. The per capita income for the county was $12,185. About 24.20% of families and 25.90% of the population were below the poverty line, including 29.80% of those under age 18 and 30.20% of those age 65 or over.

== Politics ==
The county is a Democratic stronghold. Since the county was founded in 1913, every Democratic presidential candidate has carried the county. In the entire nation, only Brooks County, Texas, Kalawao County, Hawaii, and Menominee County, Wisconsin can make a similar claim since their foundations. The Democratic candidate has consistently received more than 65 percent of the county's vote from 1976 to 2016, although in 2024 the Democratic vote percentage declined to 54.01. Jim Hogg was one of the few counties in Texas that voted for Senator John Kerry of Massachusetts over the incumbent George W. Bush. Kerry won by almost a 2-to-1 majority. He received 1,344 votes while Bush only received 712 votes.

United States presidential election results for Jim Hogg County, Texas
Year	Republican		Democratic		Third party(ies)	
Year	No.	%	No.	%	No.	%
1916	11	5.56%	187	94.44%	0	0.00%
1920	23	24.73%	70	75.27%	0	0.00%
1924	19	12.03%	139	87.97%	0	0.00%
1928	109	29.30%	263	70.70%	0	0.00%
1932	51	10.65%	428	89.35%	0	0.00%
1936	48	6.32%	712	93.68%	0	0.00%
1940	100	10.99%	810	89.01%	0	0.00%
1944	77	10.80%	620	86.96%	16	2.24%
1948	73	8.81%	725	87.45%	31	3.74%
1952	309	22.69%	1,053	77.31%	0	0.00%
1956	282	31.13%	617	68.10%	7	0.77%
1960	224	15.15%	1,255	84.85%	0	0.00%
1964	152	9.93%	1,375	89.87%	3	0.20%
1968	223	14.34%	1,276	82.06%	56	3.60%
1972	765	47.28%	848	52.41%	5	0.31%
1976	429	20.68%	1,645	79.32%	0	0.00%
1980	535	26.79%	1,437	71.96%	25	1.25%
1984	608	26.29%	1,703	73.63%	2	0.09%
1988	510	23.80%	1,630	76.06%	3	0.14%
1992	478	22.65%	1,520	72.04%	112	5.31%
1996	307	16.94%	1,437	79.30%	68	3.75%
2000	623	28.88%	1,512	70.10%	22	1.02%
2004	712	34.48%	1,344	65.08%	9	0.44%
2008	472	26.01%	1,336	73.61%	7	0.39%
2012	356	21.36%	1,301	78.04%	10	0.60%
2016	430	20.29%	1,635	77.16%	54	2.55%
2020	833	40.91%	1,197	58.79%	6	0.29%
2024	725	45.74%	856	54.01%	4	0.25%

United States Senate election results for Jim Hogg County, Texas1
Year	Republican		Democratic		Third party(ies)	
Year	No.	%	No.	%	No.	%
2024	586	38.58%	917	60.37%	16	1.05%

United States Senate election results for Jim Hogg County, Texas2
Year	Republican		Democratic		Third party(ies)	
Year	No.	%	No.	%	No.	%
2020	652	35.36%	1,136	61.61%	56	3.04%

Texas Gubernatorial election results for Jim Hogg County
Year	Republican		Democratic		Third party(ies)	
Year	No.	%	No.	%	No.	%
2022	650	42.15%	876	56.81%	16	1.04%

== Education ==
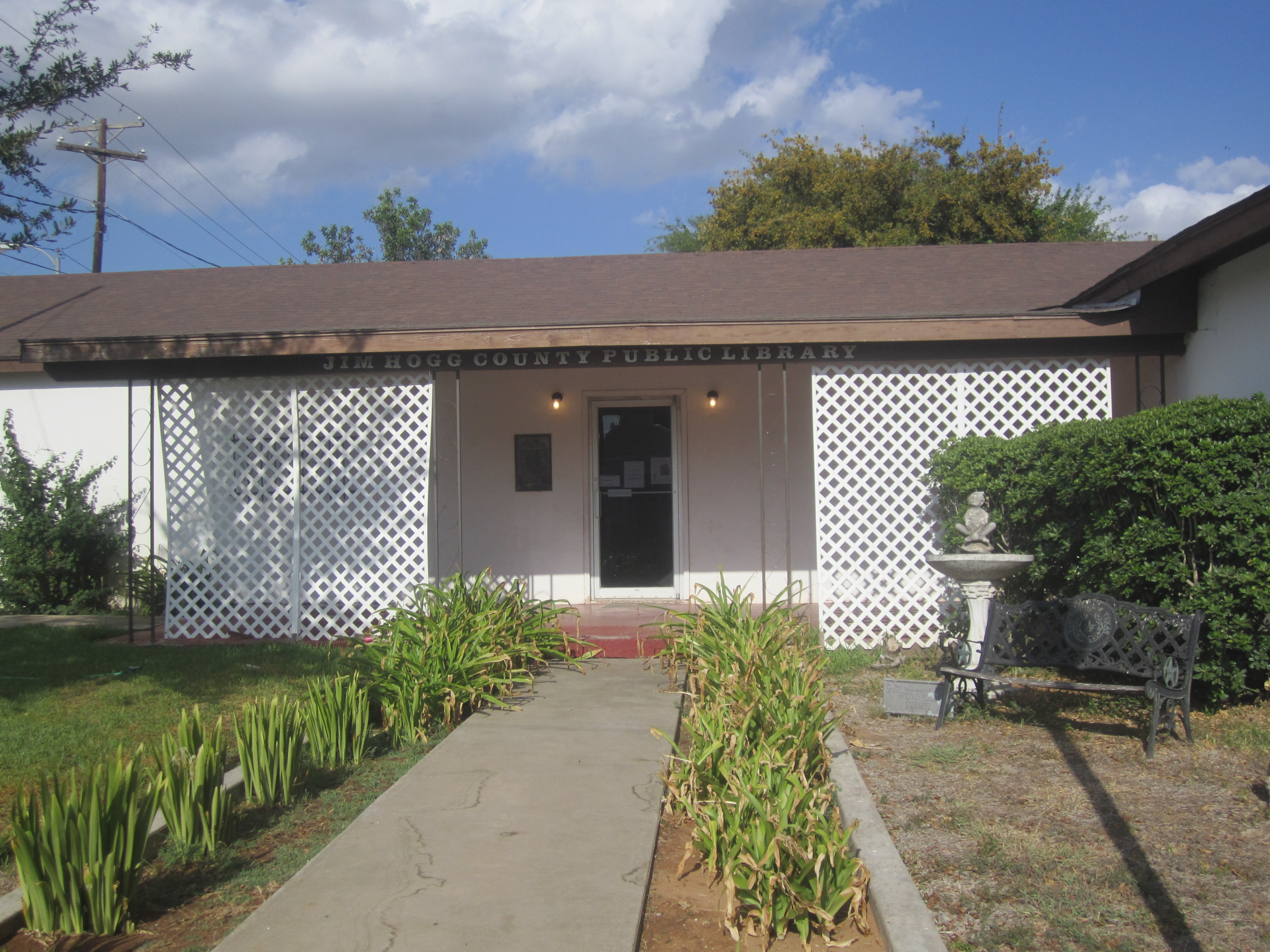
Jim Hogg County Library is located near the courthouse.

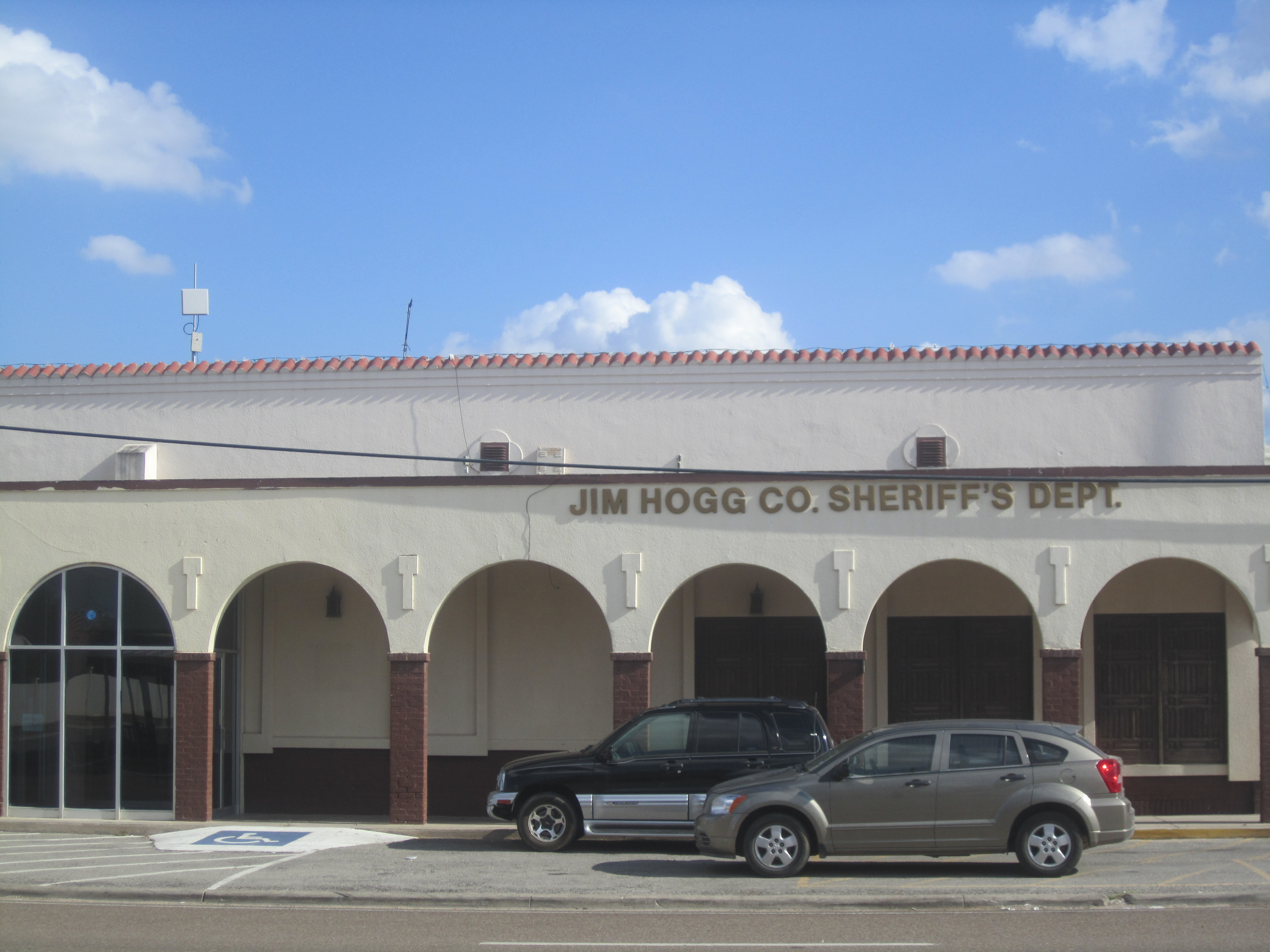
Sheriff's Office Hebbronville

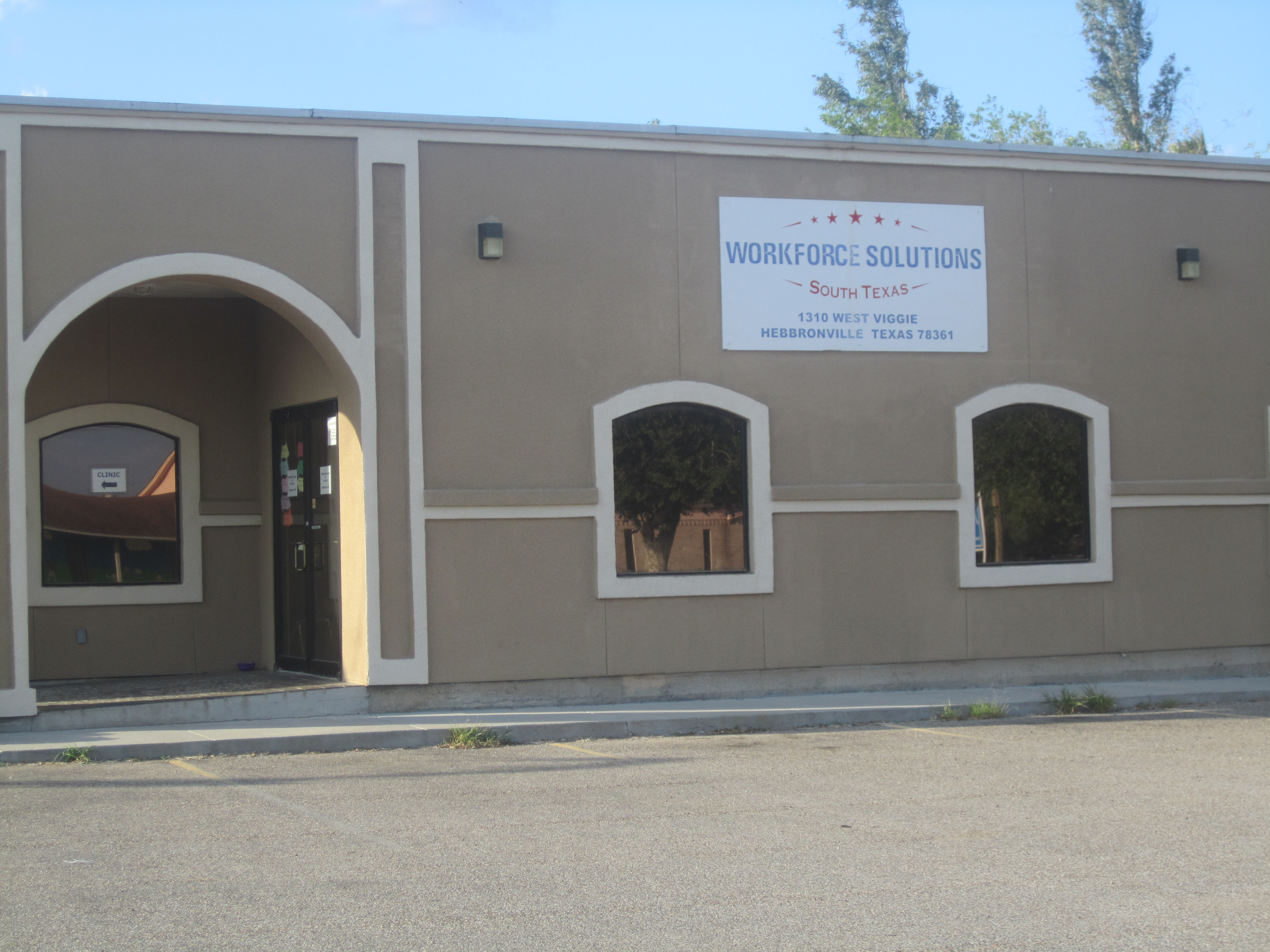
South Texas Workforce Solutions office in Hebbronville

All of the county is served by the Jim Hogg County Independent School District.

The district has three schools: Hebbronville Elementary School, Hebbronville Junior High School, and Hebbronville High School. All of the schools are considered to be in the Hebbronville community.

Residents are zoned to Laredo Community College.

== Communities ==
=== Census-designated places ===
- Guerra
- Hebbronville (county seat)
- Las Lomitas
- South Fork Estates
- Thompsonville

=== Unincorporated communities ===
- Agua Nueva
- Randado

== See also ==
- Recorded Texas Historic Landmarks in Jim Hogg County
