= Duval County, Texas =

County in Texas, United States

- County
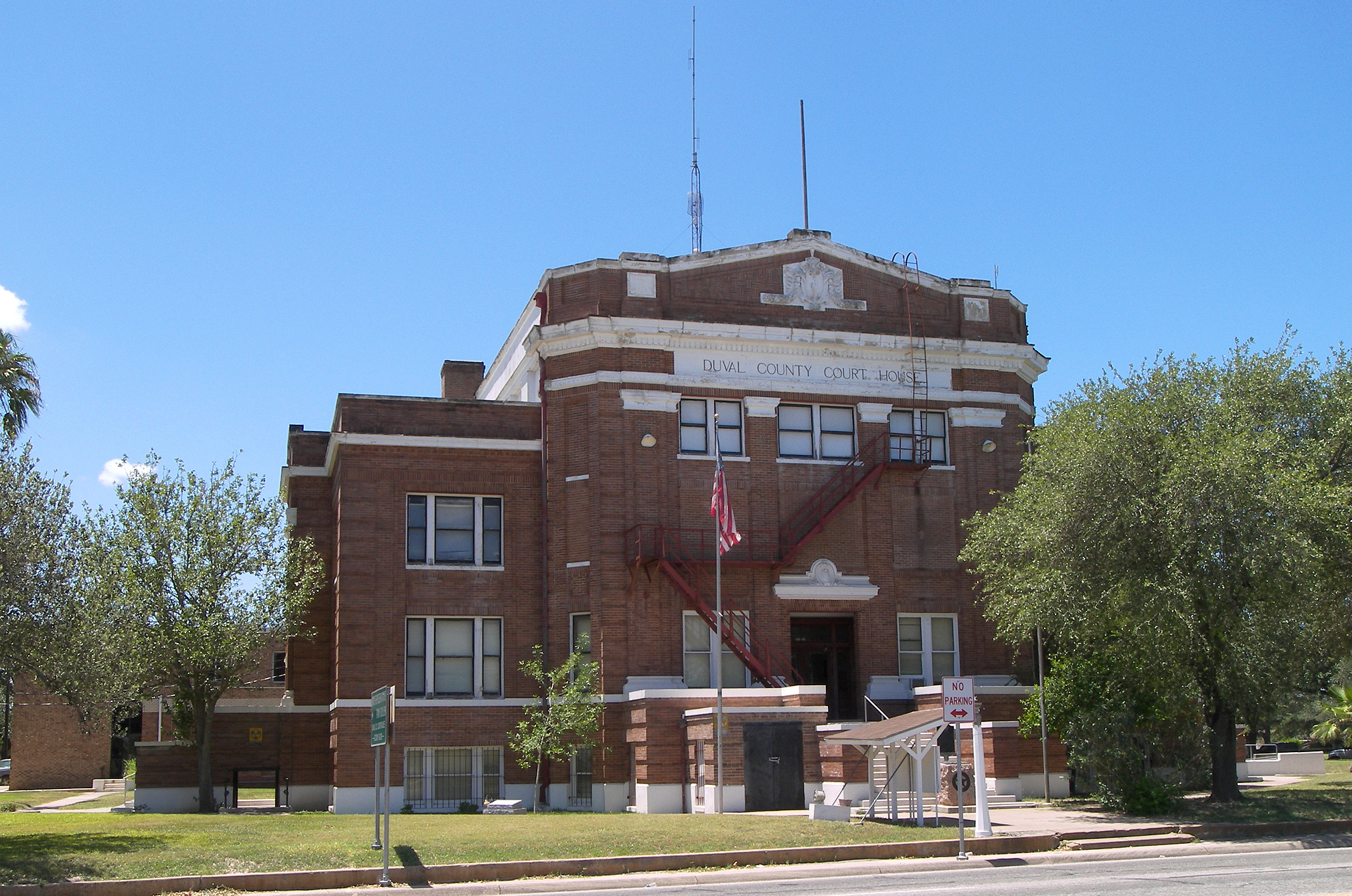
- The Duval County Courthouse in San Diego

- Location within the U.S. state of Texas
- Coordinates: 27°41′N 98°31′W
- Country: United States
- State: Texas
- Founded: 1876
- Named for: Burr H. Duval
- Seat: San Diego
- Largest city: San Diego

Area
  - Total: 1,796 sq mi (4,650 km^{2})
  - Land: 1,793 sq mi (4,640 km^{2})
  - Water: 2.1 sq mi (5.4 km^{2}) 0.1%

Population (2020)
  - Total: 9,831
  - Estimate (2025): 9,402 ▼
  - Density: 5.483/sq mi (2.117/km^{2})
- Time zone: UTC−6 (Central)
  - Summer (DST): UTC−5 (CDT)
- Congressional district: 28th
- Website: www.co.duval.tx.us

Duval County is a county located in the U.S. state of Texas. As of the 2020 census, its population was 9,831. Its county seat is San Diego. The county was founded in 1858 and later organized in 1876. It is named for Burr H. Duval, a soldier in the Texas Revolution who died in the Goliad Massacre.

== History ==
Duval County's development began during the Viceroyalty of New Spain (1521–1821). In 1804, six years before Father Miguel Hidalgo y Costilla launched Mexico's successful independence movement from Spain, Jose Faustino Contreras, surveyor general of San Luis Potosi, charted the county's landscape, which attracted colonists from Mier, Tamaulipas.

On February 1, 1858, the Texas Legislature established Duval County. The Texas Almanac of 1867 reported that Duval and nearby Dimmit County had only four stock raisers and their population was unlikely to grow much, absent the discovery of mineral wealth. Not long after, a wave of Anglo immigrants entered the county to raise sheep. Englishmen, Frenchmen, Germans, Irishmen, and Scots came. During this boom, the county seat enjoyed formal balls and haute cuisine. The Hotel Martinet's Sunday feast drew patrons from Corpus Christi, 50 miles (80 km) to the East.

The death rate rivaled Tombstone, Arizona's. Although some died under the code duello, most of Duval County's deaths were murders that primarily victimized the legacy Spanish-speaking population. When a great pile of cowhides presumed to have come from stolen animals was discovered near the county line, a vigilante group from Duval and McMullen County lynched 15 Spanish-speaking Texans there.

In April of 1878, a large Indian raid carried out by the Kickapoo, Seminole, and Lipan Apache ended up in the deaths of more than 10 people.

Prosperity in the 1880s placated Anglo animosity. When the Texas Mexican Railway began operating in 1881, its San Diego station served as an important hub for trading hides, wool and cotton, but the boom evaporated when sheep began dying during the Winter of 1886–1887, triggering the Sheep Wars that once again primarily victimized the legacy Spanish-speaking population.

During the twentieth century, the Parr family established a political machine that dominated politics in Duval and nearby Jim Wells counties. The family was instrumental in the 1948 election of Lyndon B. Johnson to the US Senate, and influenced the outcome of the 1960 presidential election which threw Texas to John F. Kennedy.

== Geography ==
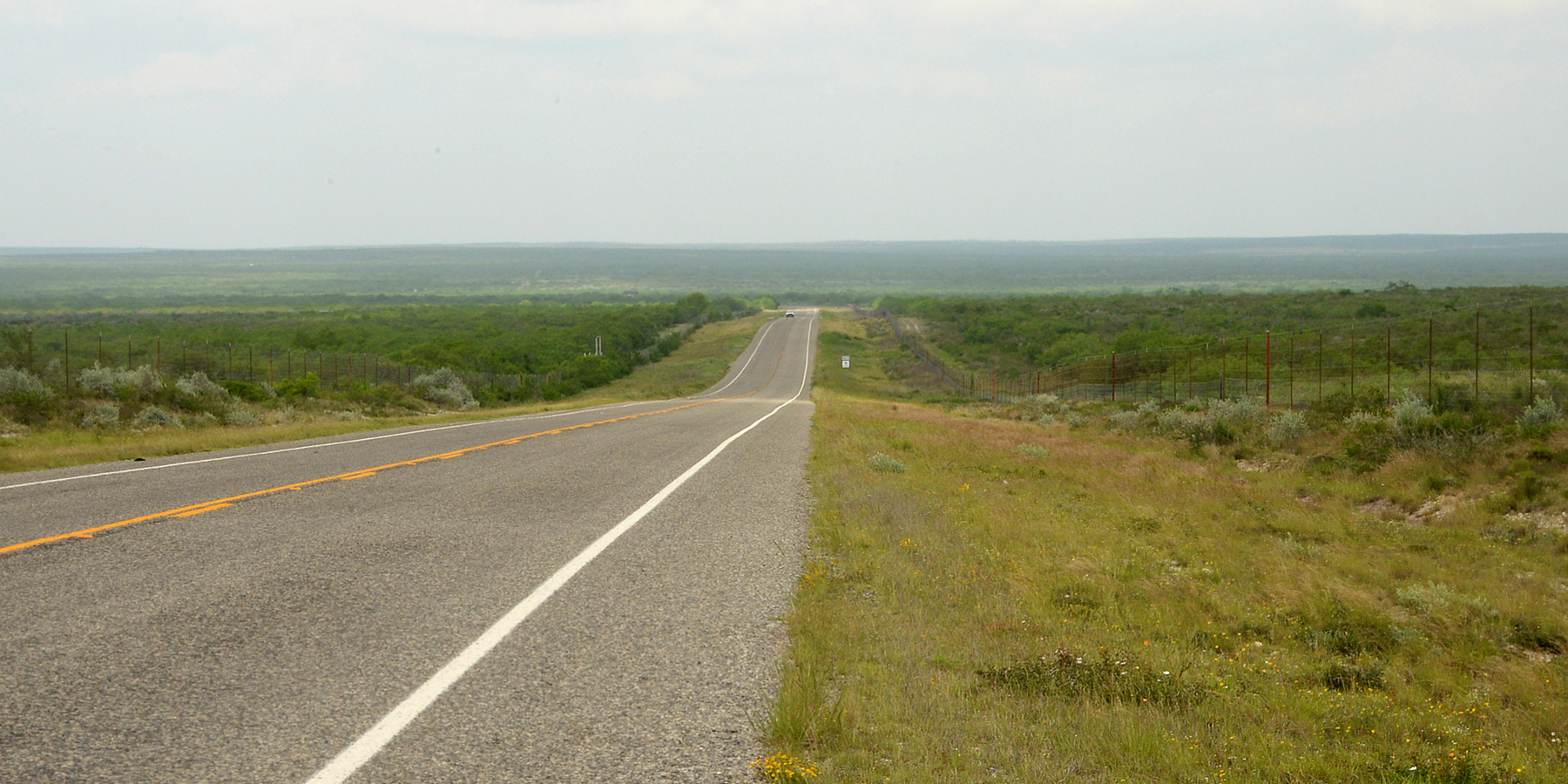
State Highway 16, Duval County (April 16, 2016)

According to the U.S. Census Bureau, the county has a total area of 1,796 square miles (4,650 km^{2}), of which 1,793 square miles (4,640 km^{2}) is land and 2.1 square miles (5.4 km^{2}) (0.1%) is water. The county overlies the Piedras Pintas salt dome, scheduled for at hydrogen storage.

=== Major highways ===
- U.S. Highway 59
  - Interstate 69W is currently under construction and will follow the current route of U.S. 59 in most places.
- State Highway 16
- State Highway 44
- State Highway 285
- State Highway 339
- State Highway 359
- Farm to Market Road 716
- Farm to Market Road 1329
- Farm to Market Road 2295
- Farm to Market Road 3196

=== Adjacent counties ===
- McMullen County (north)
- Live Oak County (northeast)
- Jim Wells County (east)
- Brooks County (southeast)
- Jim Hogg County (south)
- Webb County (west)
- La Salle County (northwest)

== Demographics ==
Historical population
Census	Pop.	Note	%±
1870	1,083		—
1880	5,732		429.3%
1890	7,598		32.6%
1900	8,483		11.6%
1910	8,964		5.7%
1920	8,251		−8.0%
1930	12,191		47.8%
1940	20,565		68.7%
1950	15,643		−23.9%
1960	13,398		−14.4%
1970	11,722		−12.5%
1980	12,517		6.8%
1990	12,918		3.2%
2000	13,120		1.6%
2010	11,782		−10.2%
2020	9,831		−16.6%
2025 (est.)	9,402	▼	−4.4%
U.S. Decennial Census; 1850–2010 2010 2020

=== Racial and ethnic composition ===
Duval County, Texas – Racial and ethnic composition Note: the US Census treats Hispanic/Latino as an ethnic category. This table excludes Latinos from the racial categories and assigns them to a separate category. Hispanics/Latinos may be of any race.
Race / Ethnicity (NH = Non-Hispanic)	Pop 1980	Pop 1990	Pop 2000	Pop 2010	Pop 2020	% 1980	% 1990	% 2000	% 2010	% 2020
White alone (NH)	1,753	1,601	1,452	1,206	937	14.00%	12.39%	11.07%	10.24%	9.53%
Black or African American alone (NH)	10	8	57	86	145	0.08%	0.06%	0.43%	0.73%	1.47%
Native American or Alaska Native alone (NH)	12	4	22	18	13	0.10%	0.03%	0.17%	0.15%	0.13%
Asian alone (NH)	2	12	12	17	45	0.02%	0.09%	0.09%	0.14%	0.46%
Native Hawaiian or Pacific Islander alone (NH)	x	x	0	5	0	x	x	0.00%	0.04%	0.00%
Other race alone (NH)	5	26	10	6	8	0.04%	0.20%	0.08%	0.05%	0.08%
Mixed race or Multiracial (NH)	x	x	23	20	721	x	x	0.18%	0.17%	7.33%
Hispanic or Latino (any race)	10,735	11,267	11,544	10,424	7,962	85.76%	87.22%	87.99%	88.47%	80.99%
Total	12,517	12,918	13,120	11,782	9,831	100.00%	100.00%	100.00%	100.00%	100.00%

=== 2020 census ===
As of the 2020 census, the county had a population of 9,831. The median age was 39.3 years. 23.6% of residents were under the age of 18 and 18.8% of residents were 65 years of age or older. For every 100 females there were 108.2 males, and for every 100 females age 18 and over there were 109.5 males age 18 and over.

The racial makeup of the county was 50.8% White, 1.6% Black or African American, 0.5% American Indian and Alaska Native, 0.5% Asian, <0.1% Native Hawaiian and Pacific Islander, 12.5% from some other race, and 34.1% from two or more races. Hispanic or Latino residents of any race comprised 81.0% of the population.

<0.1% of residents lived in urban areas, while 100.0% lived in rural areas.

There were 3,507 households in the county, of which 34.3% had children under the age of 18 living in them. Of all households, 43.5% were married-couple households, 21.0% were households with a male householder and no spouse or partner present, and 31.3% were households with a female householder and no spouse or partner present. About 27.5% of all households were made up of individuals and 13.9% had someone living alone who was 65 years of age or older.

There were 4,396 housing units, of which 20.2% were vacant. Among occupied housing units, 74.8% were owner-occupied and 25.2% were renter-occupied. The homeowner vacancy rate was 1.0% and the rental vacancy rate was 15.7%.

=== 2010 census ===
As of the 2010 United States census, there were 11,782 people living in the county. 87.0% were White, 0.9% Black or African American, 0.4% Native American, 0.2% Asian, 9.8% of some other race and 1.7% of two or more races. 88.5% were Hispanic or Latino (of any race).

=== 2000 census ===
As of the 2000 census, there were 13,120 people, 4,350 households, and 3,266 families living in the county. The population density was 7 people per square mile (2.7 people/km^{2}). There were 5,543 housing units at an average density of 3 units per square mile (1.2/km^{2}).

The racial makeup of the county was 80.22% White, 0.54% Black or African American, 0.53% Native American, 0.11% Asian, 0.03% Pacific Islander, 15.46% from other races, and 3.11% from two or more races. 87.99% of the population were Hispanic or Latino of any race.

There were 4,350 households, out of which 36.80% had children under the age of 18 living with them, 53.20% were married couples living together, 16.80% had a female householder with no husband present, and 24.90% were non-families. 22.90% of all households were made up of individuals, and 11.70% had someone living alone who was 65 years of age or older. The average household size was 2.88 and the average family size was 3.40.

In the county, the population was spread out, with 29.50% under the age of 18, 9.50% from 18 to 24, 26.40% from 25 to 44, 20.60% from 45 to 64, and 14.00% who were 65 years of age or older. The median age was 34 years. For every 100 females there were 100.70 males. For every 100 females age 18 and over, there were 102.90 males.

The median income for a household in the county was $22,416, and the median income for a family was $26,014. Males had a median income of $25,601 versus $16,250 for females. The per capita income for the county was $11,324. About 23.00% of families and 27.20% of the population were below the poverty line, including 35.90% of those under age 18 and 25.30% of those age 65 or over.

== Politics ==
Duval County was a longtime Democratic stronghold, like most of heavily Hispanic South Texas. In the 1964, 1968 and 1972 presidential elections, Duval was the most Democratic county in the country. In 2004, the county voted for Democrat John F. Kerry of Massachusetts by a strong margin despite George W. Bush's 22.87 percent margin of victory in the state. From 1956 to 2012, the Democratic candidate consistently received more than seventy percent of the county's vote. After 2012, the county's voters began to trend towards the Republican Party; the Democratic margin of victory decreased by 18.9 percentage points from 2012 to 2016, and by 32.6 percentage points from 2016 to 2020, with 2020 Democratic presidential nominee Joe Biden winning the county by only 2.6 percent, the narrowest-ever Democratic victory in the county. In 2022, Ryan Guillen became the first Republican to carry the county since Theodore Roosevelt in 1904. In 2024, Donald Trump was the second Republican to carry the county. Overall, Duval County shifted to the right from 2012 to 2024 by 64 percentage points, representing one of the strongest such rightward shifts for any county in the country.

United States presidential election results for Duval County, Texas
Year	Republican		Democratic		Third party(ies)	
Year	No.	%	No.	%	No.	%
1912	0	0.00%	915	99.03%	9	0.97%
1916	37	5.81%	597	93.72%	3	0.47%
1920	86	7.33%	1,081	92.08%	7	0.60%
1924	89	8.42%	947	89.59%	21	1.99%
1928	434	25.85%	1,245	74.15%	0	0.00%
1932	30	1.88%	1,566	98.12%	0	0.00%
1936	163	5.31%	2,901	94.56%	4	0.13%
1940	151	4.46%	3,232	95.51%	1	0.03%
1944	136	3.87%	3,353	95.31%	29	0.82%
1948	117	3.18%	3,551	96.52%	11	0.30%
1952	672	16.85%	3,316	83.13%	1	0.03%
1956	1,459	31.89%	3,110	67.98%	6	0.13%
1960	809	17.53%	3,803	82.42%	2	0.04%
1964	353	7.37%	4,432	92.55%	4	0.08%
1968	384	8.57%	3,978	88.74%	121	2.70%
1972	623	14.32%	3,729	85.68%	0	0.00%
1976	661	13.38%	4,267	86.36%	13	0.26%
1980	1,012	21.27%	3,706	77.91%	39	0.82%
1984	1,201	24.22%	3,748	75.58%	10	0.20%
1988	907	17.79%	4,177	81.95%	13	0.26%
1992	698	13.86%	4,006	79.56%	331	6.57%
1996	543	11.65%	3,958	84.94%	159	3.41%
2000	1,010	20.08%	3,990	79.32%	30	0.60%
2004	1,160	28.35%	2,916	71.28%	15	0.37%
2008	1,076	24.40%	3,298	74.80%	35	0.79%
2012	980	22.56%	3,331	76.68%	33	0.76%
2016	1,316	31.57%	2,783	66.77%	69	1.66%
2020	2,443	48.35%	2,575	50.96%	35	0.69%
2024	2,439	54.67%	2,003	44.90%	19	0.43%

United States Senate election results for Duval County, Texas1
Year	Republican		Democratic		Third party(ies)	
Year	No.	%	No.	%	No.	%
2024	1,872	44.82%	2,190	52.43%	115	2.75%

United States Senate election results for Duval County, Texas2
Year	Republican		Democratic		Third party(ies)	
Year	No.	%	No.	%	No.	%
2020	1,787	40.53%	2,458	55.75%	164	3.72%
2026	984	30.00%	2,189	66.74%	107	3.26%

Texas Gubernatorial election results for Duval County
Year	Republican		Democratic		Third party(ies)	
Year	No.	%	No.	%	No.	%
2022	1,600	43.53%	2,018	54.90%	58	1.58%
2026	1,174	35.15%	2,117	63.38%	49	1.47%

After the initial election returns in the 1948 Democrat runoff primary election for U.S. Senate, Duval County added 425 votes for Lyndon B. Johnson over Coke R. Stevenson. (George Parr simultaneously arranged the more famous electoral fraud for Johnson in Alice, Texas.)

Duval County is notorious for corrupt politics, particularly during the early and mid-20th century, when it was largely controlled by the political machine of Texas State Senator Archie Parr and his son George Parr, each in his turn called El Patrón or the "Duke of Duval". Givens Parr had been county judge before his younger brother George. George was later elected sheriff. Archer Parr III, George's nephew and adopted brother, later held both those offices. Meanwhile, then Texas Attorney General John Ben Shepperd brought some 300 state indictments against county and school officials.

== Communities ==
=== Cities ===
- Benavides
- Freer
- San Diego (county seat) (small part in Jim Wells County)

=== Census-designated places ===
- Concepcion
- Realitos

=== Unincorporated communities ===
- Ramirez
- Rios
- Sejita
- Seven Sisters

=== Ghost towns ===
- Crestonio
- Pila Blanca
- Sweden

== Education ==
School districts for the county include:

- Benavides Independent School District
- Freer Independent School District
- Premont Independent School District
- Ramirez Common School District
- San Diego Independent School District

Coastal Bend College (formerly Bee County College) is the designated community college for the county.

== See also ==
- Recorded Texas Historic Landmarks in Duval County
