= Benavides Independent School District =

School district in Texas, United States

Location
- Benavides, Texas ESC Region 2 USA
- Coordinates: 27°35′42″N 98°24′49″W

District information
- Type: Independent school district
- Grades: Pre-K through 12
- Superintendent: Daniel Ceballos
- Schools: 2 (2009-10)
- NCES District ID: 4899130

Students and staff
- Students: 391 (2010-11)
- Teachers: 34.95 (2009-10) (on full-time equivalent (FTE) basis)
- Student–teacher ratio: 11.67 (2009-10)
- Athletic conference: UIL Class 2A Football Division II
- District mascot: Eagles
- Colors: Red, White

Other information
- TEA District Accountability Rating for 2011: Academically Acceptable
- Website: Benavides ISD

Benavides Independent School District is a public school district based in Benavides, Texas (USA). The district is situated in the southwestern corner of Duval County. In addition to Benavides, the unincorporated communities of Concepcion and Realitos are also part of the district.

Seventh through twelfth grade students living in the Ramirez Common School District attend Benavides schools.

== Finances ==
As of the 2010–2011 school year, the appraised valuation of property in the district was $285,808,000. The maintenance tax rate was $0.104 and the bond tax rate was $0.021 per $100 of appraised valuation.

== Academic achievement ==
In 2011, the school district was rated "academically acceptable" by the Texas Education Agency.

== Schools ==
In the 2011–2012 school year, the district had two open schools.

- Benavides Secondary School (Grades 7-12)
- Benavides Elementary School (Grades PK-6)

== See also ==
- List of school districts in Texas
