= Jim Hogg County Independent School District =

School district in Texas, United States

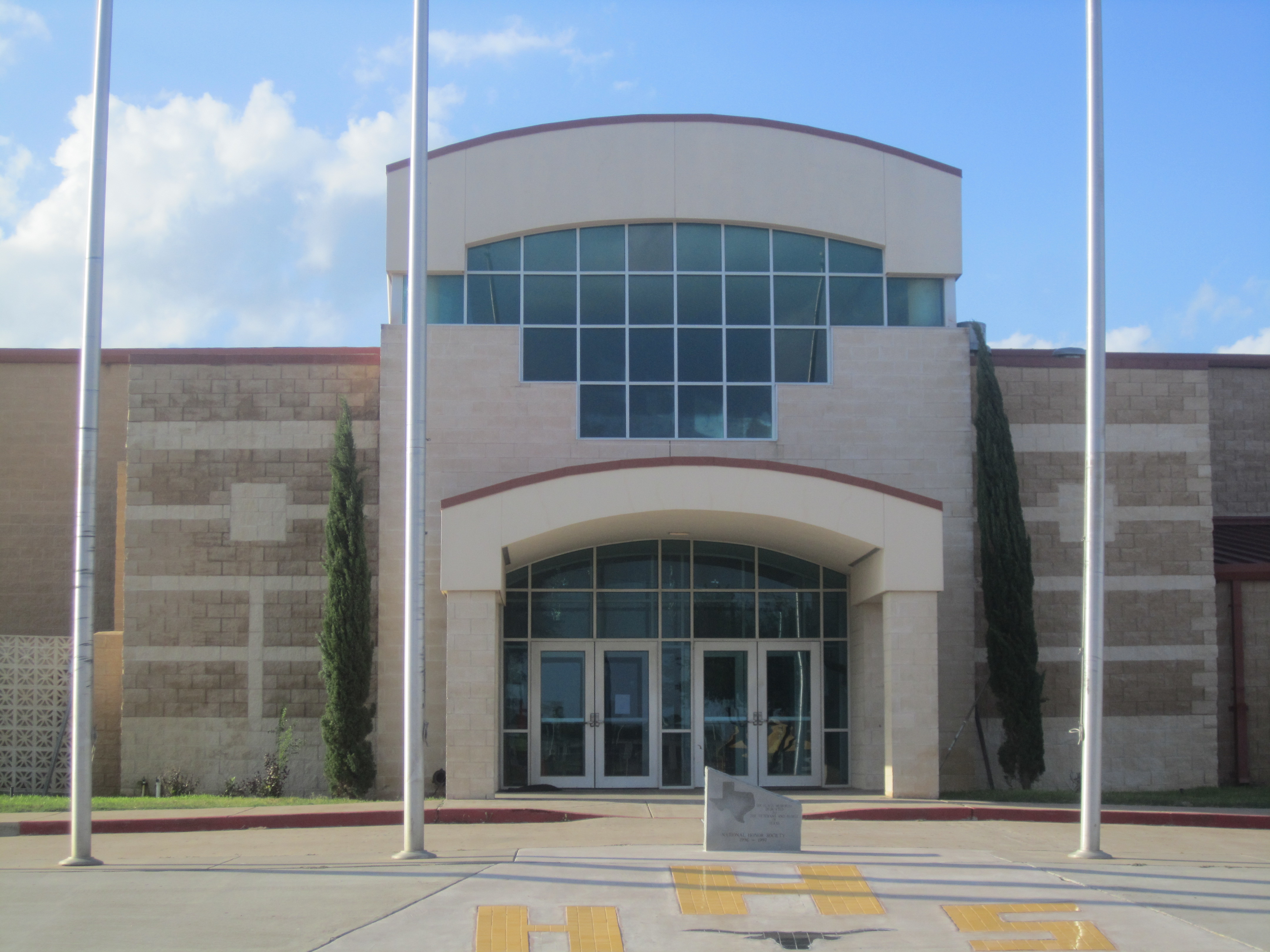
- Hebbronville High School front entrance.

Address
- 210 West Lucille Jim Hogg County, Texas Hebronville, Texas, 78361; United States

District information
- Grades: PK–12
- Superintendent: Dr. Susana P. Garza
- Schools: 3
- NCES District ID: 4824750

Students and staff
- Students: 1,000 (2023–2024)
- Teachers: 81.93 (on an FTE basis)
- Student–teacher ratio: 12.21:1

Other information
- Website: www.jhcisdpk12.org

Jim Hogg County Independent School District is a public school district based in Hebbronville, Texas (USA). The district boundaries parallel those of Jim Hogg County.

In 2009, the school district was rated "academically acceptable" by the Texas Education Agency.

== Schools ==
- Hebbronville High School (Grades 9-12)
- Hebbronville Junior High (Grades 6-8)
- Hebbronville Elementary (Grades PK-5)
