= San Diego, Texas =

City in Texas, United States

- City
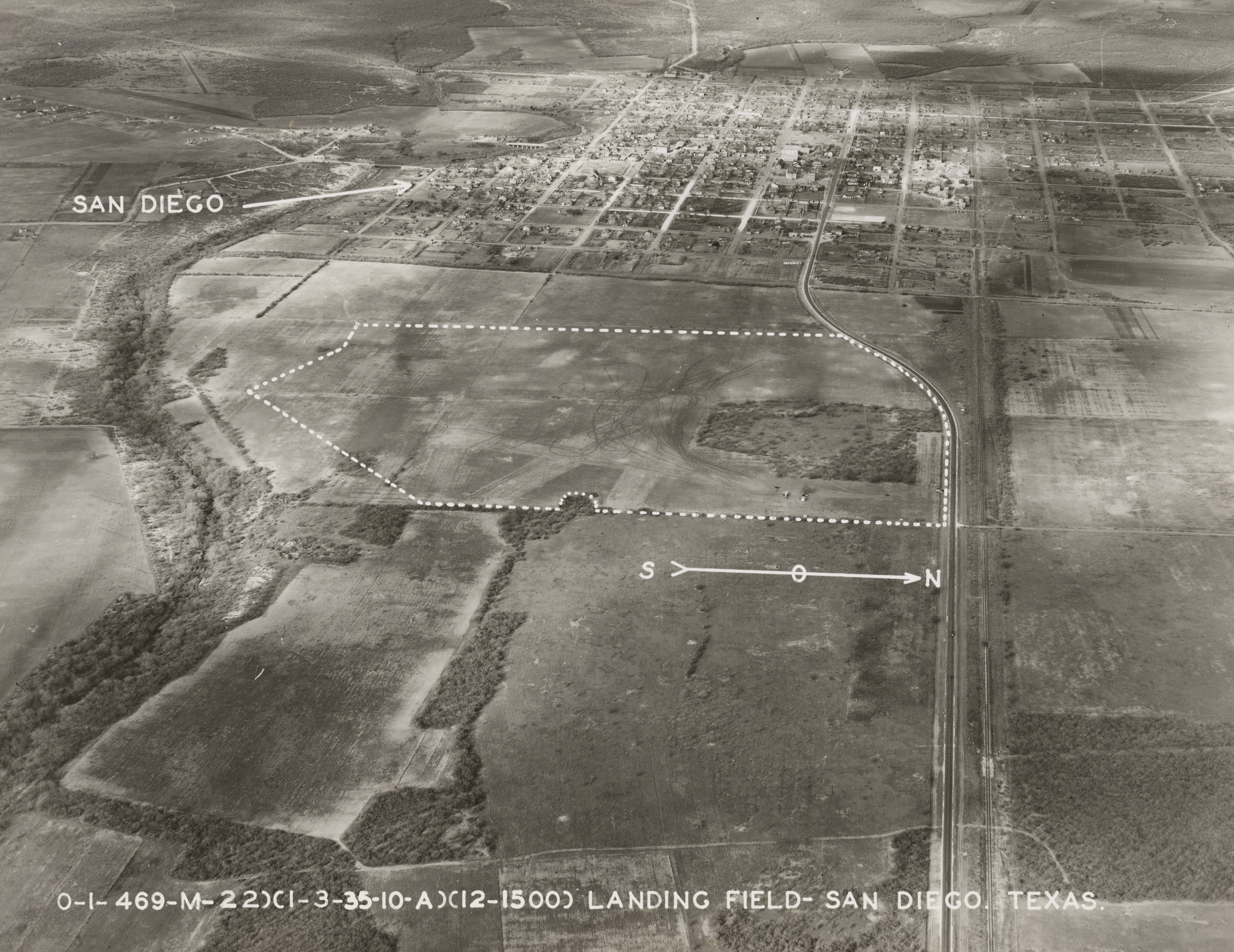
- San Diego in 1935

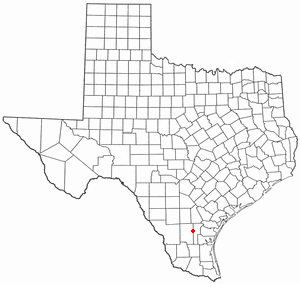
- Location in the state of Texas

- Coordinates: 27°45′45″N 98°14′20″W
- Country: United States
- State: Texas
- Counties: Duval, Jim Wells
- Named for: Didacus of Alcalá

Government
  - Mayor: Sally Lichtenberger

Area
  - Total: 1.90 sq mi (4.92 km^{2})
  - Land: 1.90 sq mi (4.92 km^{2})
  - Water: 0 sq mi (0.00 km^{2})
- Elevation: 308 ft (94 m)

Population (2020)
  - Total: 3,748
  - Density: 1,970/sq mi (762/km^{2})
- Time zone: UTC-6 (CST)
  - Summer (DST): UTC-5 (CDT)
- ZIP code: 78384
- Area code: 361
- FIPS code: 48-65180
- GNIS feature ID: 1346324
- Website: https://cityofsandiegotx.com/

San Diego is a city in Duval and Jim Wells counties, Texas, United States. The population was 3,748 at the 2020 census and 4,488 at the 2010 census. It is located primarily in Duval County, of which it is the county seat.

== Geography ==
San Diego is located at 27°45′45″N 98°14′20″W (27.762559, –98.238771). It is 10 miles (16 km) west of Alice, 56 miles (90 km) west of Corpus Christi, and 84 miles (135 km) east of Laredo.

According to the United States Census Bureau, San Diego has a total area of 1.9 square miles (4.9 km^{2}), all land.

== Demographics ==
=== 2020 census ===
As of the 2020 census, there were 3,748 people, 1,351 households, and 916 families residing in the city. The median age was 36.2 years, 27.6% of residents were under the age of 18, and 16.7% of residents were 65 years of age or older. For every 100 females there were 92.9 males, and for every 100 females age 18 and over there were 88.4 males age 18 and over.

0.0% of residents lived in urban areas, while 100.0% lived in rural areas.

There were 1,351 households in San Diego, of which 37.1% had children under the age of 18 living in them. Of all households, 39.5% were married-couple households, 20.1% were households with a male householder and no spouse or partner present, and 35.9% were households with a female householder and no spouse or partner present. About 25.7% of all households were made up of individuals and 12.5% had someone living alone who was 65 years of age or older.

There were 1,614 housing units, of which 16.3% were vacant. The homeowner vacancy rate was 0.8% and the rental vacancy rate was 19.4%.

Racial composition as of the 2020 census
Race	Number	Percent
White	1,786	47.7%
Black or African American	14	0.4%
American Indian and Alaska Native	13	0.3%
Asian	14	0.4%
Native Hawaiian and Other Pacific Islander	0	0.0%
Some other race	437	11.7%
Two or more races	1,484	39.6%
Hispanic or Latino (of any race)	2,904	77.5%

=== 2000 census ===
Historical population
Census	Pop.	Note	%±
1880	1,572		—
1890	1,877		19.4%
1940	2,674		—
1950	4,397		64.4%
1960	4,351		−1.0%
1970	4,490		3.2%
1980	5,225		16.4%
1990	4,983		−4.6%
2000	4,753		−4.6%
2010	4,488		−5.6%
2020	3,748		−16.5%
U.S. Decennial Census

At the 2000 census there were 4,753 people, 1,548 households, and 1,187 families living in the city. The population density was 2,917.1 inhabitants per square mile (1,126.3/km^{2}). There were 1,793 housing units at an average density of 1,100.4 per square mile (424.9/km^{2}). The racial makeup of the city was 78.06% White, 0.27% African American, 0.78% Native American, 0.02% Asian, 0.04% Pacific Islander, 17.72% from other races, and 3.11% from two or more races. Hispanic or Latino of any race were 96.87%.

Of the 1,548 households 40.5% had children under the age of 18 living with them, 47.3% were married couples living together, 24.4% had a female householder with no husband present, and 23.3% were non-families. 21.3% of households were one person and 11.0% were one person aged 65 or older. The average household size was 3.03 and the average family size was 3.52.

The age distribution was 32.9% under the age of 18, 9.5% from 18 to 24, 25.1% from 25 to 44, 19.4% from 45 to 64, and 13.1% 65 or older. The median age was 31 years. For every 100 females, there were 87.3 males. For every 100 females age 18 and over, there were 84.5 males.

The median household income was $19,250 and the median family income was $25,104. Males had a median income of $21,875 versus $14,622 for females. The per capita income for the city was $9,782. About 26.8% of families and 32.2% of the population were below the poverty line, including 44.3% of those under age 18 and 26.8% of those age 65 or over.

== Education ==
The city is served by the San Diego Independent School District and is home to the San Diego High School Vaqueros.

== Notable people ==
- Sylvia Garcia (born 1950), U.S. representative for Texas
- Bob Osborn (1903–1960), baseball player

== See also ==
- List of municipalities in Texas
- Plan of San Diego
