= Hebbronville, Texas =

Census-designated place in Jim Hogg County, Texas, United States

- County seat and Census-designated place
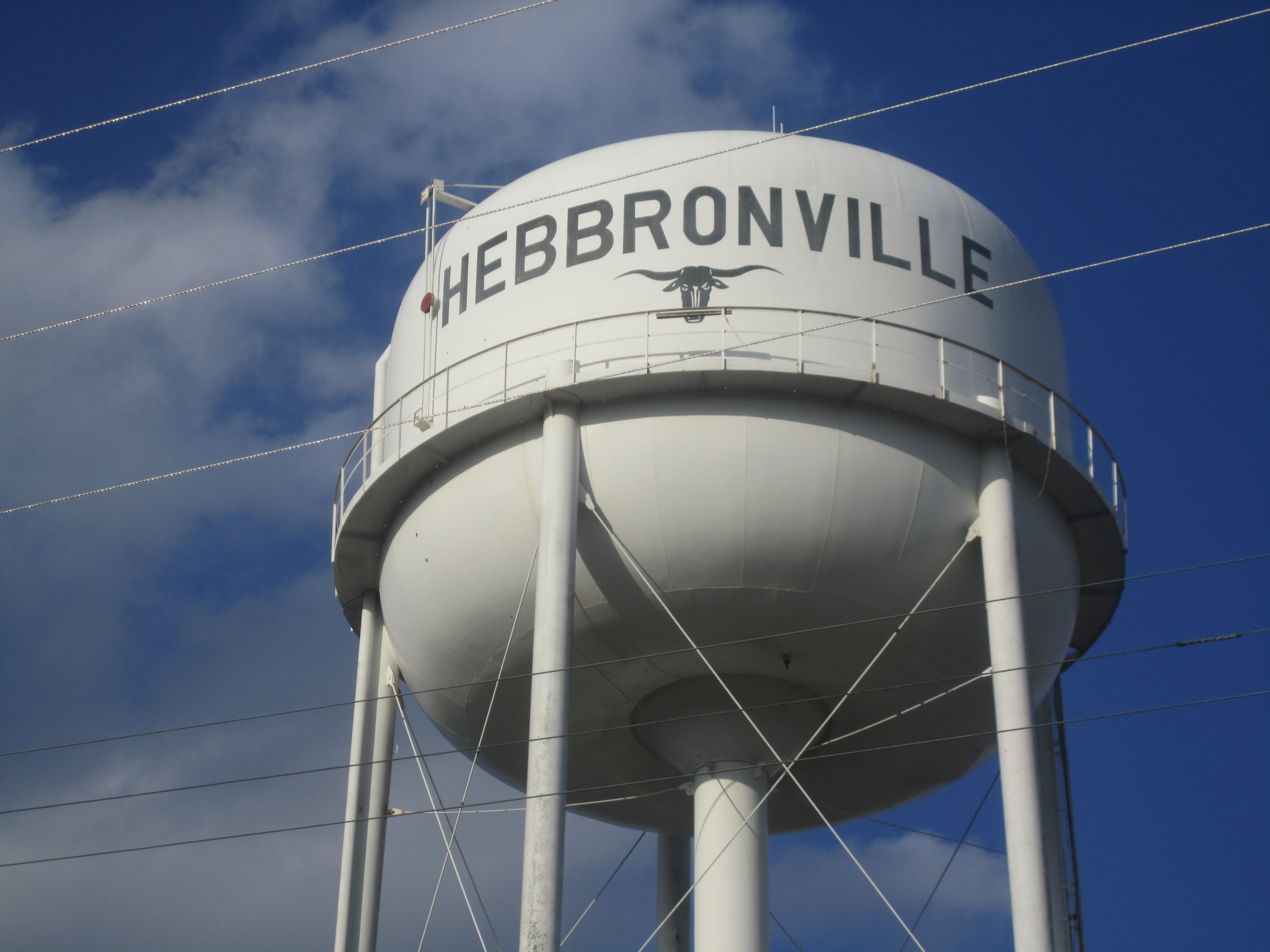
- Water tower in Hebbronville

- Location within Texas
- Coordinates: 27°18′41″N 98°40′52″W
- Country: United States
- State: Texas
- County: Jim Hogg

Area
  - Total: 6.3 sq mi (16.2 km^{2})
  - Land: 6.3 sq mi (16.2 km^{2})
  - Water: 0 sq mi (0.0 km^{2})
- Elevation: 548 ft (167 m)

Population (2020)
  - Total: 4,101
  - Density: 656/sq mi (253/km^{2})
- Time zone: UTC−6 (Central (CST))
  - Summer (DST): UTC−5 (CDT)
- ZIP code: 78361
- Area code: 361
- FIPS code: 48-33008
- GNIS feature ID: 1337545

Hebbronville (/ˈhɛbrənvɪl/ HEB-rən-vil) is a census-designated place (CDP) in and the county seat of Jim Hogg County, Texas, United States. The population was 4,101 at the 2020 census.

The Colegio Altamirano, founded by settlers of Spanish ancestry who wanted their children to learn Spanish culture, was an institution in Hebbronville from 1897 until its closing in 1958.

== Geography ==
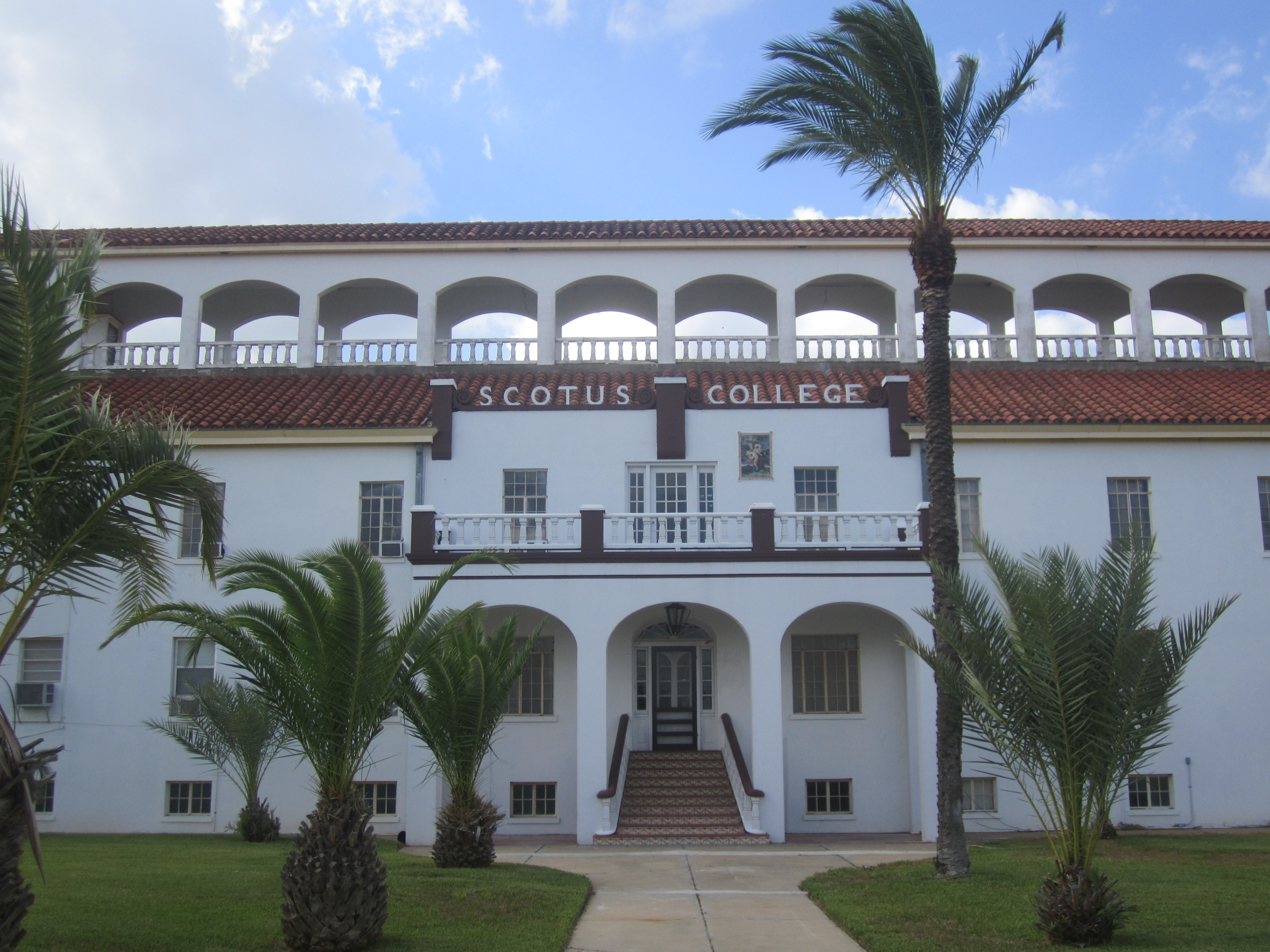
Scotus College, used for the training of Roman Catholic priests, moved from Mexico to Hebbronville in 1926 to escape religious persecution.

Hebbronville is located in northern Jim Hogg County at 27°18′41″N 98°40′52″W (27.311259, −98.680998). It is bordered to the east by Las Lomitas and to the north by Duval County.

Texas State Highway 16 (Smith Avenue) passes through the center of town, leading northward 40 miles (64 km) to Freer and southwestward 51 miles (82 km) to Zapata. Texas State Highway 359 (Viggie Street) leads northwest 56 miles (90 km) to Laredo and northeast 53 miles (85 km) to Alice, while Texas State Highway 285 leads east 34 miles (55 km) to Falfurrias.

According to the United States Census Bureau, the Hebbronville CDP has a total area of 6.3 square miles (16.2 km^{2}), all land.

=== Climate ===
Hebbronville has a borderline humid subtropical climate (Köppen climate classification Cfa)/hot semi-arid climate (Köppen BSh). Summers are very hot and humid: 152 afternoons each year top 90 °F or 32.2 °C, with 27.6 afternoons reaching 100 °F or 37.8 °C and during the summer of 2009 eleven afternoons topped 110 °F or 43.3 °C. During July and August combined, all but three mornings stay above 68 °F or 20 °C and seven mornings per year stay above 77 °F or 25 °C, with as many as forty mornings staying over this temperature during 1998. The hottest temperature on record has been 118 °F (47.8 °C) on July 9, 2009, and the hottest minimum 88 °F (31.1 °C) on September 30, 2009, followed by 87 °F (30.6 °C) the following day.

During the summer, rain is not common, but when a Gulf of Mexico hurricane moves inland it can be very heavy. From September 11 to 13, 1971, a total of 14.10 inches (358.1 mm) fell over three days from such a system, 14.73 inches (374.1 mm) in four days from September 20 to 23 of 1967, and 6.00 inches (152.4 mm) fell on August 27 and 28, 1909. In contrast, no measurable precipitation fell in Hebbronville from June 10 to September 7 of 1921.

Temperatures decline slowly during the "fall" season, remaining hot through until the end of October, by which time most danger of flooding from a remnant hurricane has passed. The winter months are warm and usually dry, although occasionally an easterly flow will produce substantial rainfall. Three substantial storms in February and March 1923 produced a total of 11.06 inches (280.9 mm), and the ten-day period from December 13 to 22 of 1991 saw 7.13 inches or 181.1 millimetres of rainfall; however, only 1.71 inches or 43.4 millimetres fell between October 1970 and the end of March 1971. Frosts do occasionally occur during the winter – 9.9 mornings fall to or below freezing during an average winter – but measurable snow has fallen in Hebbronville only three times in 112 years – on March 10, 1932, on January 20, 1940 during South Texas' coolest month on record, and on Christmas Day of 2004 when 5 inches or 0.13 metres fell in a famous "White Christmas".

Since 1905 the wettest calendar year has been 1995 with 42.75 inches (1,085.8 mm) and the driest 1996 with 11.52 inches (292.6 mm), whilst September 1967 has proved the wettest month with 19.35 inches (491.5 mm). The wettest single day has been September 12, 1971 with 9.40 inches (238.8 mm).

Climate data for Hebbronville, Texas (1981–2010 normals, extremes 1905, 1916–1917, 1928–1936, 1958–2013)
Month	Jan	Feb	Mar	Apr	May	Jun	Jul	Aug	Sep	Oct	Nov	Dec	Year
Record high °F (°C)	95 (35)	99 (37)	102 (39)	109 (43)	112 (44)	114 (46)	118 (48)	117 (47)	110 (43)	107 (42)	95 (35)	93 (34)	118 (48)
Mean maximum °F (°C)	85.1 (29.5)	88.8 (31.6)	93.3 (34.1)	98.0 (36.7)	101.9 (38.8)	102.8 (39.3)	103.7 (39.8)	104.2 (40.1)	99.9 (37.7)	96.3 (35.7)	89.7 (32.1)	84.9 (29.4)	107.6 (42.0)
Mean daily maximum °F (°C)	67.6 (19.8)	72.0 (22.2)	78.3 (25.7)	85.3 (29.6)	90.8 (32.7)	95.5 (35.3)	96.7 (35.9)	97.7 (36.5)	92.2 (33.4)	85.9 (29.9)	77.1 (25.1)	68.3 (20.2)	84.0 (28.9)
Daily mean °F (°C)	56.2 (13.4)	60.1 (15.6)	66.4 (19.1)	73.4 (23.0)	79.9 (26.6)	84.3 (29.1)	85.3 (29.6)	85.6 (29.8)	81.1 (27.3)	74.1 (23.4)	65.3 (18.5)	56.9 (13.8)	72.4 (22.4)
Mean daily minimum °F (°C)	44.8 (7.1)	48.2 (9.0)	54.5 (12.5)	61.5 (16.4)	69.0 (20.6)	73.2 (22.9)	73.9 (23.3)	73.6 (23.1)	69.9 (21.1)	62.3 (16.8)	53.6 (12.0)	45.5 (7.5)	60.8 (16.0)
Mean minimum °F (°C)	28.9 (−1.7)	32.4 (0.2)	36.5 (2.5)	45.1 (7.3)	56.7 (13.7)	66.3 (19.1)	69.7 (20.9)	69.0 (20.6)	57.9 (14.4)	43.8 (6.6)	34.8 (1.6)	28.7 (−1.8)	25.9 (−3.4)
Record low °F (°C)	12 (−11)	15 (−9)	20 (−7)	33 (1)	47 (8)	53 (12)	61 (16)	60 (16)	48 (9)	34 (1)	22 (−6)	12 (−11)	12 (−11)
Average precipitation inches (mm)	1.25 (32)	1.45 (37)	1.19 (30)	1.46 (37)	3.10 (79)	2.57 (65)	2.67 (68)	1.69 (43)	3.30 (84)	2.36 (60)	1.35 (34)	1.40 (36)	23.79 (604)
Average snowfall inches (cm)	0.0 (0.0)	0.0 (0.0)	0.0 (0.0)	0.0 (0.0)	0.0 (0.0)	0.0 (0.0)	0.0 (0.0)	0.0 (0.0)	0.0 (0.0)	0.0 (0.0)	0.0 (0.0)	0.2 (0.51)	0.2 (0.51)
Average precipitation days (≥ 0.01 in)	6.0	4.9	4.3	4.1	5.0	4.6	4.8	3.8	6.6	4.6	4.1	5.2	58.0
Average snowy days (≥ 0.1 in)	0.0	0.0	0.0	0.0	0.0	0.0	0.0	0.0	0.0	0.0	0.0	0.0	0.0
Source: NOAA

== Origin ==
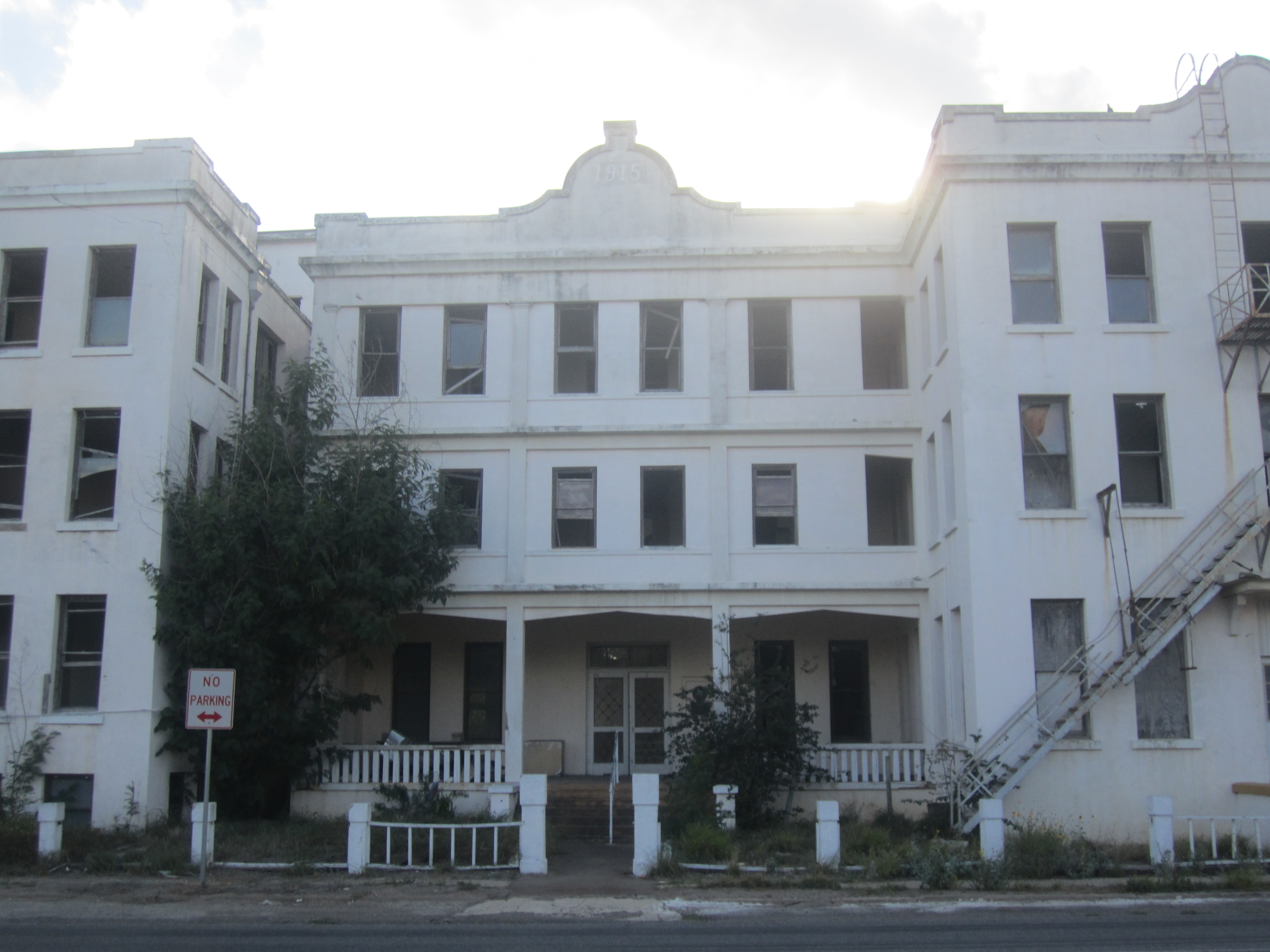
The abandoned Hotel Viggo (built 1915) is located across the highway from the Jim Hogg County Courthouse in Hebbronville.

Hebbronville is located on land which once formed part of Las Noriecitas, one of the earliest ranches founded in the area.

The town's namesake, James Richard Hebbron, acquired land, circa 1880, from the descendants of the original grantee, Ignacio Benavides. With two others, he bought 18,000 acres (7,300 ha), in what was then Duval County, just above Peña. One of his sons, Arthur Hebbron, came down from California and took charge of running his ranch.

Hebbronville itself was created in 1883, when the Texas-Mexican Railway Company built a railroad through the area. Francisco P. Peña, operator of Peña Station on this route, refused to sell any land to the Texas-Mexican for a townsite. The company then approached J. R. Hebbron, who arranged for the sale of land for the new townsite, near Peñitas. The old train station at Peñitas was then loaded onto a flatcar, moved 1½ miles west and named Hebbronville.

For a time, Hebbronville ranked as the largest cattle-shipping center in the country, and it continues to be a hub of ranching activity.

A photograph of James R. Hebbron hangs in the Jim Hogg County Courthouse at 102 East Tilley Street in Hebbronville. He was born in 1828, in London, England, but spent most of his adult life in California, mainly around Salinas, dying there in 1926.

== Demographics ==
Historical population
Census	Pop.	Note	%±
1950	3,947		—
1960	3,987		1.0%
1970	4,079		2.3%
1980	4,684		14.8%
1990	4,465		−4.7%
2000	4,498		0.7%
2010	4,558		1.3%
2020	4,101		−10.0%
U.S. Decennial Census; 1850–1900 1910; 1920 1930 1940; 1950 1960 1970; 1980 1990 2000; 2010

Hebbronville was first listed as an unincorporated community in the 1950 U.S. census; and as a census designated place in the 1980 United States census.

=== Racial and ethnic composition ===
Hebbronville CDP, Texas – Racial and ethnic composition Note: the US Census treats Hispanic/Latino as an ethnic category. This table excludes Latinos from the racial categories and assigns them to a separate category. Hispanics/Latinos may be of any race.
Race / ethnicity (NH = Non-Hispanic)	Pop 2000	Pop 2010	Pop 2020	% 2000	% 2010	% 2020
White alone (NH)	375	276	336	8.34%	6.06%	8.19%
Black or African American alone (NH)	22	18	5	0.49%	0.39%	0.12%
Native American or Alaska Native alone (NH)	18	14	10	0.40%	0.31%	0.24%
Asian alone (NH)	2	14	23	0.04%	0.31%	0.56%
Native Hawaiian or Pacific Islander alone (NH)	0	0	5	0.00%	0.00%	0.12%
Other Race alone (NH)	0	0	8	0.00%	0.00%	0.20%
Mixed race or Multiracial (NH)	8	5	77	0.18%	0.11%	1.88%
Hispanic or Latino (any race)	4,073	4,231	3,637	90.55%	0.00%	88.69%
Total	4,498	4,558	4,101	100.00%	100.00%	100.00%

=== 2020 census ===
As of the 2020 census, Hebbronville had a population of 4,101. The median age was 38.3 years. 27.9% of residents were under the age of 18 and 19.5% were 65 years of age or older. For every 100 females, there were 93.8 males, and for every 100 females age 18 and over, there were 91.9 males.

0.0% of residents lived in urban areas, while 100.0% lived in rural areas.

There were 1,433 households in Hebbronville, of which 37.7% had children under the age of 18 living in them. Of all households, 43.4% were married-couple households, 19.9% were households with a male householder and no spouse or partner present, and 30.6% were households with a female householder and no spouse or partner present. About 25.6% of all households were made up of individuals, and 11.2% had someone living alone who was 65 years of age or older.

There were 1,892 housing units, of which 24.3% were vacant. The homeowner vacancy rate was 4.9% and the rental vacancy rate was 15.7%.

=== 2000 census ===
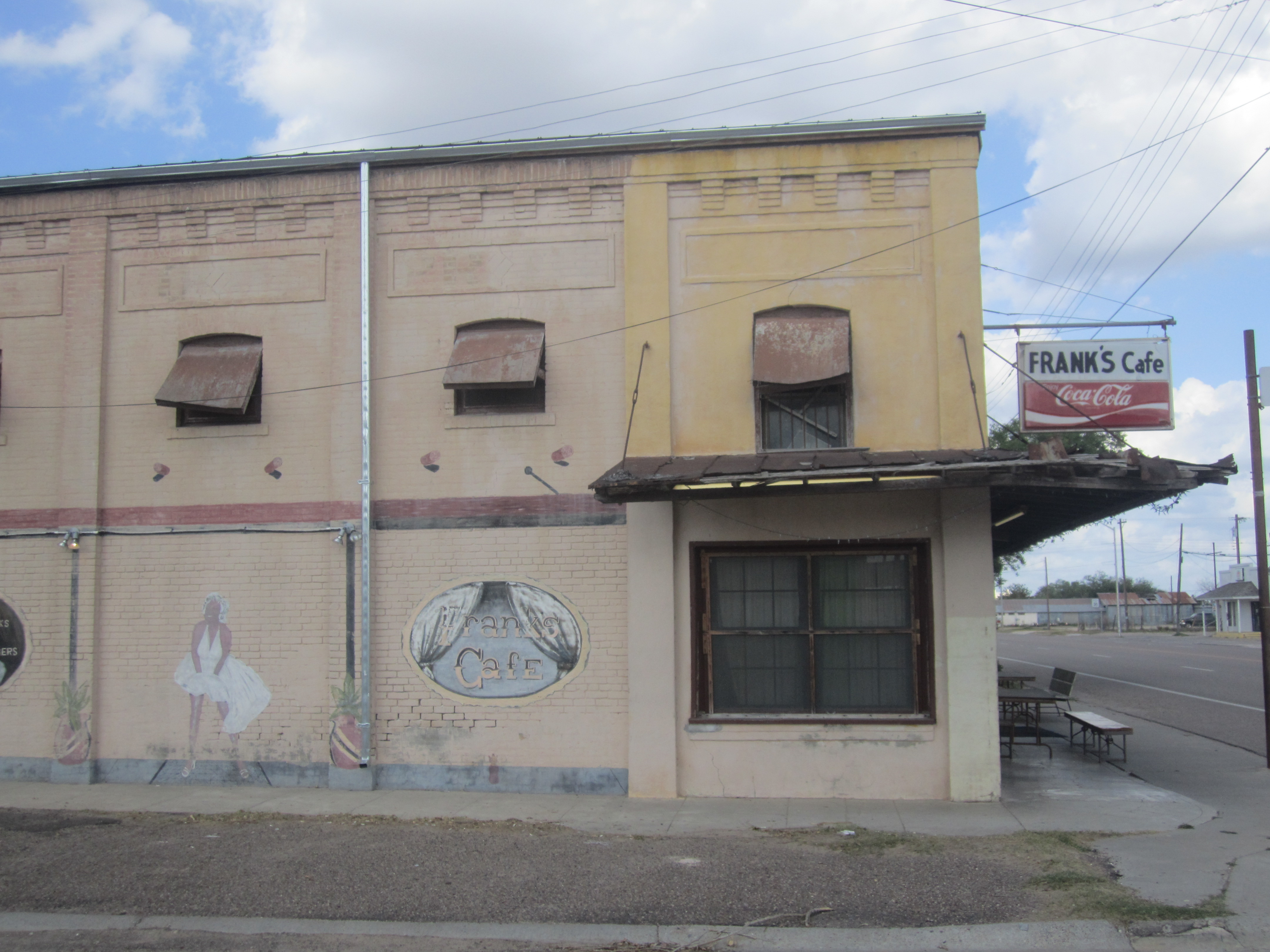
The rustic Frank's Cafe at 502 E. Galbraith St. in Hebbronville was featured in 2004 in an episode of Bob Phillips's Texas Country Reporter.

As of the census of 2000, there were 4,498 people, 1,554 households, and 1,165 families residing in the CDP. The population density was 763.4 inhabitants per square mile (294.8/km^{2}). There were 1,853 housing units at an average density of 314.5 per square mile (121.4/km^{2}). The racial makeup of the CDP was 81.79% White, 0.53% African American, 0.89% Native American, 0.18% Asian, 14.81% from other races, and 1.80% from two or more races. Hispanic or Latino of any race were 90.55% of the population.

There were 1,554 households, out of which 38.1% had children under the age of 18 living with them, 54.6% were married couples living together, 15.2% had a female householder with no husband present, and 25.0% were non-families. 23.4% of all households were made up of individuals, and 12.9% had someone living alone who was 65 years of age or older. The average household size was 2.87 and the average family size was 3.41.

In the CDP, the population was spread out, with 31.1% under the age of 18, 8.1% from 18 to 24, 24.2% from 25 to 44, 21.1% from 45 to 64, and 15.5% who were 65 years of age or older. The median age was 34 years. For every 100 females, there were 95.9 males. For every 100 females age 18 and over, there were 90.4 males.

The median income for a household in the CDP was $24,558, and the median income for a family was $29,358. Males had a median income of $27,042 versus $17,772 for females. The per capita income for the CDP was $12,271. About 25.2% of families and 25.9% of the population were below the poverty line, including 28.5% of those under age 18 and 32.0% of those age 65 or over.

== Education ==
Hebbronville, as with all of Jim Hogg County, is served by the Jim Hogg County Independent School District. El Cenizo Headstart is a Federally funded educational program for 3–5-year-old students. It operates on the same schedule as the district. The district has three schools, all within the town: Hebbronville Elementary School, Hebbronville Junior High School, and Hebbronville High School.

== See also ==
- List of census-designated places in Texas
