= La Gloria, Jim Wells County, Texas =

Unincorporated community in Texas, US

Coordinates: 27°16′53″N 98°08′00″W

La Gloria is an unincorporated community in southern Jim Wells County, Texas, United States.

== Education ==
The La Gloria Independent School District serves students in grades pre-kindergarten through six, while seventh through twelfth graders attend Premont or Brooks County (Falfurrias) schools, the latter including Falfurrias High School.

== History ==
La Gloria is twenty-eight miles west of Linn on FM1017 (U.S. Highway 281). It is located two miles north of the FM1017-FM755 intersection. A post office was established there in 1908, and by 1914 the community had a population of fifty, a cotton gin, a general store, and telephone service. The San Antonio and Aransas Pass Railway built a stop at La Gloria in 1914. The post office closed in 1918. In 1936, the community consisted of a school and scattered dwellings and farms. In 1963 La Gloria still had a school, as well as a water tank and an oil refinery. It remained a dispersed community in 1993.

== Education ==
La Gloria is served by the La Gloria Independent School District, the Premont Independent School District and the Brooks County Independent School District.
