= Pedrito =

Pedrito, meaning "little Pedro" or "little Peter" in many Romance languages, may refer to:

== People ==
- Pedrito (footballer, born 1989), Spanish forward
- Pedrito (footballer, born 1996), Spanish midfielder
- Pedrito Reyes (fl. 1930s), Filipino writer, co-creator of the Kulafu comic strip
- Pedrito Ríos, semi-mythical "drummer boy of Tacuarí"
- Pedrito Sierra (born 1989), Puerto Rican volleyball player
- Don Pedro Jaramillo (died 1907), curandero from the Mexico-Texas border region, known as "Don Pedrito"
- Pedro Pascal (actor) (born 1975)
- Pedro Calvo, Cuban popular singer known as "Pedrito"
- Pedro Fernández (singer) (born 1969), Mexican recording artist and actor, known as "Pedrito"
- Pedro Ruiz Carrilero, a feridor for Circuit Bancaixa 05/06 a Spanish pilota team
- Margarita Landi (1918–2004), Spanish journalist

== Places ==
- Dom Pedrito, a municipality in Rio Grande do Sul, Brazil
- Nazca (Buenos Aires Metro), a station on the Buenos Aires Metro, known as "San Pedrito"
- San Pedrito Point, a headland at Todos los Santos, Baja California Sur
  - San Pedrito, a beach off San Pedrito Point
- San Pedrito, a beach in Manzanillo Municipality, Colima, Mexico
- San Pedrito, a shrine in the Macizo de Anaga mountains of the Canary Islands

== Other uses ==
- "Pedrito Chávez", a song by Dominican folk musician Ñico Lora
- Pedrito el Drito, an Italian comic series
- Puerto Rican tody, a bird known as "San Pedrito"
