= Flowella, Texas =

- Census-designated place
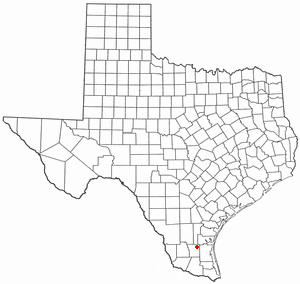
- Location of Flowella, Texas

- Coordinates: 27°13′9″N 98°3′58″W
- Country: United States
- State: Texas
- County: Brooks

Area
  - Total: 1.0 sq mi (2.6 km^{2})
  - Land: 1.0 sq mi (2.6 km^{2})
  - Water: 0 sq mi (0.0 km^{2})
- Elevation: 95 ft (29 m)

Population (2020)
  - Total: 117
  - Density: 120/sq mi (45/km^{2})
- Time zone: UTC-6 (Central (CST))
  - Summer (DST): UTC-5 (CDT)
- ZIP code: 78355
- Area code: 361
- FIPS code: 48-26220
- GNIS feature ID: 1335980

Flowella (also known as "La Parrita") is a census-designated place (CDP) in Brooks County, Texas, United States. The population was 117 at the 2020 census.

== Geography ==
Flowella is located at 27°13′9″N 98°3′58″W (27.219277, -98.066155) near the intersection of State Highway 285 and FM 2191 in northeastern Brooks County. It is situated approximately 5 miles (8 km) east of Falfurrias, the Brooks County seat.

According to the United States Census Bureau, the CDP has a total area of 1.0 square mile (2.6 km^{2}), all land.

== History ==
Flowella was founded in 1909 by promoters Burton and Danforth. The community was planned with a flowing well as its centerpiece. A post office was established in Flowella in 1910. It remained in operation for the next 13 years. Sixty people were living in the community in 1914. The town also had a hotel and general store.

The growth of nearby Falfurrias kept the population of Flowella small. It exists today as a rural, dispersed community.

== Demographics ==
Historical population
Census	Pop.	Note	%±
2000	134		—
2010	118		−11.9%
2020	117		−0.8%
U.S. Decennial Census; 1850–1900 1910; 1920 1930 1940; 1950 1960 1970; 1980 1990 2000; 2010 2020

Flowella first appeared as a census designated place in the 2000 U.S. census.

=== 2020 census ===
Flowella CDP, Texas – Racial and ethnic composition Note: the US Census treats Hispanic/Latino as an ethnic category. This table excludes Latinos from the racial categories and assigns them to a separate category. Hispanics/Latinos may be of any race.
Race / Ethnicity (NH = Non-Hispanic)	Pop 2000	Pop 2010	Pop 2020	% 2000	% 2010	% 2020
White alone (NH)	4	6	0	2.99%	5.08%	0.00%
Black or African American alone (NH)	0	0	0	0.00%	0.00%	0.00%
Native American or Alaska Native alone (NH)	0	0	0	0.00%	0.00%	0.00%
Asian alone (NH)	0	0	0	0.00%	0.00%	0.00%
Native Hawaiian or Pacific Islander alone (NH)	0	0	0	0.00%	0.00%	0.00%
Other race alone (NH)	0	0	0	0.00%	0.00%	0.00%
Mixed race or Multiracial (NH)	0	0	0	0.00%	0.00%	0.00%
Hispanic or Latino (any race)	130	112	117	97.01%	94.92%	100.00%
Total	134	118	117	100.00%	100.00%	100.00%

=== 2000 census ===
As of the census of 2000, there were 134 people, 46 households, and 35 families residing in the CDP. The population density was 130.5 inhabitants per square mile (50.4/km^{2}). There were 56 housing units at an average density of 54.6 per square mile (21.1/km^{2}). The racial makeup of the CDP was 55.97% White, 43.28% from other races, and 0.75% from two or more races. Hispanic or Latino of any race were 97.01% of the population.

There were 46 households, out of which 34.8% had children under the age of 18 living with them, 47.8% were married couples living together, 15.2% had a female householder with no husband present, and 23.9% were non-families. 23.9% of all households were made up of individuals, and 10.9% had someone living alone who was 65 years of age or older. The average household size was 2.91 and the average family size was 3.31.

In the CDP, the population was spread out, with 25.4% under the age of 18, 7.5% from 18 to 24, 28.4% from 25 to 44, 20.9% from 45 to 64, and 17.9% who were 65 years of age or older. The median age was 38 years. For every 100 females, there were 119.7 males. For every 100 females age 18 and over, there were 117.4 males.

The median income for a household in the CDP was $11,250, and the median income for a family was $12,404. Males had a median income of $13,750 versus $9,844 for females. The per capita income for the CDP was $5,560. There were 50.9% of families and 37.9% of the population living below the poverty line, including 32.8% of under eighteens and 53.1% of those over 64.

== Education ==
Public education in the community of Flowella is provided by the Brooks County Independent School District.
