= Cantu Addition, Texas =

- Census-designated place
- Coordinates: 27°12′7″N 98°9′14″W
- Country: United States
- State: Texas
- County: Brooks

Area
  - Total: 0.31 sq mi (0.8 km^{2})
  - Land: 0.31 sq mi (0.8 km^{2})
  - Water: 0 sq mi (0.0 km^{2})
- Elevation: 112 ft (34 m)

Population (2020)
  - Total: 191
  - Density: 620/sq mi (240/km^{2})
- Time zone: UTC-6 (Central (CST))
  - Summer (DST): UTC-5 (CDT)
- FIPS code: 48-12502
- GNIS feature ID: 1852690

Cantu Addition is a census-designated place (CDP) in Brooks County, Texas, United States. Its population was 191 at the 2020 census.

== Geography ==
Cantu Addition is located at 27°12′7″N 98°9′14″W (27.201979, -98.153909). The community is situated just west of U.S. Highway 281, approximately 2 miles (3 km) southwest of Falfurrias in northern Brooks County.

According to the United States Census Bureau, the CDP has a total area of 0.31 sq mi (0.8 km^{2}), all land.

== Demographics ==
Historical population
Census	Pop.	Note	%±
2000	217		—
2010	188		−13.4%
2020	191		1.6%
U.S. Decennial Census; 1850–1900 1910; 1920 1930 1940; 1950 1960 1970; 1980 1990 2000; 2010 2020

Cantu Addition first appeared as a census designated place in the 2000 U.S. census.

=== 2000 ===
Cantu Addition CDP, Texas – Racial and ethnic composition Note: the US Census treats Hispanic/Latino as an ethnic category. This table excludes Latinos from the racial categories and assigns them to a separate category. Hispanics/Latinos may be of any race.
Race / Ethnicity (NH = Non-Hispanic)	Pop 2000	Pop 2010	Pop 2020	% 2000	% 2010	% 2020
White alone (NH)	7	8	17	3.23%	4.26%	8.90%
Black or African American alone (NH)	0	0	0	0.00%	0.00%	0.00%
Native American or Alaska Native alone (NH)	2	0	0	0.92%	0.00%	0.00%
Asian alone (NH)	0	0	3	0.00%	0.00%	1.57%
Native Hawaiian or Pacific Islander alone (NH)	0	0	0	0.00%	0.00%	0.00%
Other race alone (NH)	0	0	0	0.00%	0.00%	0.00%
Mixed race or Multiracial (NH)	3	0	0	1.38%	0.00%	0.00%
Hispanic or Latino (any race)	205	180	171	94.47%	95.74%	89.53%
Total	217	188	191	100.00%	100.00%	100.00%

=== 2000 ===
As of the census of 2000, 217 people, 77 households, and 56 families were residing in the CDP. The population density was 723.0 people/sq mi (279.3/km^{2}). The 83 housing units averaged 276.6/sq mi (106.8/km^{2}). The racial makeup of the CDP was 64.06% White, 0.92% Native American, 32.26% from other races, and 2.76% from two or more races. Hispanics or Latinos of any race were 94.47% of the population.

Of the 77 households, 48.1% had children under the age of 18 living with them, 49.4% were married couples] living together, 19.5% had a female householder with no husband present, and 26.0% were not families. About 23.4% of all households were made up of individuals, and 2.6% had someone living alone who was 65 years of age or older. The average household size was 2.82, and the average family size was 3.28.

In the CDP, the age distribution was 32.3% under 18, 10.6% from 18 to 24, 25.3% from 25 to 44, 25.3% from 45 to 64, and 6.5% who were 65 or older. The median age was 31 years. For every 100 females, there were 99.1 males. For every 100 females age 18 and over, there were 93.4 males.

The median income for a household in the CDP was $9,191, and for a family was $9,583. Males had a median income of $12,841 versus $16,250 for females. The per capita income for the CDP was $6,492. About 53.3% of families and 45.9% of the population were below the poverty line, including none of those under the age of 18 or 65 or over.

== Education ==
Cantu Addition is served by the Brooks County Independent School District.
