= Airport Road Addition, Texas =

- Unincorporated community Census designated place
- Coordinates: 27°13′12″N 98°5′59″W
- Country: United States
- State: Texas
- County: Brooks

Area
  - Total: 2.1 sq mi (5.5 km^{2})
  - Land: 2.1 sq mi (5.5 km^{2})
  - Water: 0 sq mi (0.0 km^{2})
- Elevation: 102 ft (31 m)

Population (2020)
  - Total: 96
  - Density: 45/sq mi (17/km^{2})
- Time zone: UTC-6 (Central (CST))
  - Summer (DST): UTC-5 (CDT)
- FIPS code: 48-01514
- GNIS feature ID: 1852682

Airport Road Addition is an unincorporated community and census-designated place (CDP) in Brooks County, Texas, United States. The population was 96 at the 2020 census.

== Geography ==
Airport Road Addition is located at 27°13′12″N 98°5′59″W (27.219966, -98.099610). The community is situated approximately 3 miles (5 km) east of Falfurrias between State Highway 285 and FM 2191 in northeastern Brooks County.

According to the United States Census Bureau, the CDP has a total area of 2.1 square miles (5.5 km^{2}), all land.

== Demographics ==
Historical population
Census	Pop.	Note	%±
2000	132		—
2010	93		−29.5%
2020	96		3.2%
U.S. Decennial Census; 1850–1900 1910; 1920 1930 1940; 1950 1960 1970; 1980 1990 2000; 2010 2020

Airport Road Addition first appeared as a census designated place in the 2000 U.S. census.

=== 2020 ===
Airport Road Addition CDP, Texas – Racial and ethnic composition Note: the US Census treats Hispanic/Latino as an ethnic category. This table excludes Latinos from the racial categories and assigns them to a separate category. Hispanics/Latinos may be of any race.
Race / Ethnicity (NH = Non-Hispanic)	Pop 2000	Pop 2010	Pop 2020	% 2000	% 2010	% 2020
White alone (NH)	12	11	3	9.09%	11.83%	3.13%
Black or African American alone (NH)	1	0	0	0.76%	0.00%	0.00%
Native American or Alaska Native alone (NH)	0	0	1	0.00%	0.00%	1.04%
Asian alone (NH)	0	0	0	0.00%	0.00%	0.00%
Native Hawaiian or Pacific Islander alone (NH)	0	0	0	0.00%	0.00%	0.00%
Other race alone (NH)	0	0	0	0.00%	0.00%	0.00%
Mixed race or Multiracial (NH)	0	0	2	0.00%	0.00%	2.08%
Hispanic or Latino (any race)	119	82	90	90.15%	88.17%	93.75%
Total	132	93	96	100.00%	100.00%	100.00%

=== 2000 ===
As of the census of 2000, there were 132 people, 42 households, and 39 families residing in the CDP. The population density was 62.5 inhabitants per square mile (24.1/km^{2}). There were 45 housing units at an average density of 21.3/sq mi (8.2/km^{2}). The racial makeup of the CDP was 76.52% White, 0.76% African American, 21.97% from other races, and 0.76% from two or more races. Hispanic or Latino people of any race were 90.15% of the population.

There were 42 households, out of which 45.2% had children under the age of 18 living with them, 81.0% were married couples living together, 9.5% had a female householder with no husband present, and 4.8% were non-families. 4.8% of all households were made up of individuals, and none had someone living alone who was 65 years of age or older. The average household size was 3.14 and the average family size was 3.23.

In the CDP, the population was spread out, with 31.8% under the age of 18, 9.1% from 18 to 24, 25.8% from 25 to 44, 22.0% from 45 to 64, and 11.4% who were 65 years of age or older. The median age was 34 years. For every 100 females, there were 116.4 males. For every 100 females age 18 and over, there were 104.5 males.

The median income for a household in the CDP was $31,250, and the median income for a family was $31,250. Males had a median income of $20,568 versus $6,250 for females. The per capita income for the CDP was $6,256. There were 37.5% of families and 44.7% of the population living below the poverty line, including 64.8% of under eighteens and none of those over 64.

== Education ==
Airport Road Addition is served by the Brooks County Independent School District.
