= La Gloria Independent School District =

School district in Texas, United States

Address
- 612 N Campbell St La Gloria, Texas, 78355-9712; United States

District information
- Type: Public
- Established: 1909
- Superintendent: David Braswell
- Governing agency: Texas Education Agency
- Schools: 1
- NCES District ID: 4826070

Students and staff
- Students: 102
- Teachers: 9.00 (on an FTE basis)
- Student–teacher ratio: 11.33

Other information
- Website: www.lagloriaisd.esc2.net

La Gloria Independent School District No. 906 (LGISD) is a public school district based in the community of La Gloria, Texas (USA).

The district has one school - La Gloria Elementary - that serves students in grades pre-kindergarten through six.

Seventh through twelfth graders attend Premont High School of Premont ISD or Falfurrias High School of Brooks County ISD (Falfurrias).

In 2009, the school district was rated "academically acceptable" by the Texas Education Agency.

== History ==
It was established on October 9, 1909 as La Gloria School District No. 28, and was initially in Nueces County. Initially the district rented a facility owned by a private individual. In 1910 a brick school building was built on Block 5 in La Gloria, a community in Jim Wells County. The school district's name, the following year, changed to La Gloria Common School District No. 21 with the district now being of Jim Wells County. A replacement facility opened in the 1930s. A cafeteria facility opened in 1950. An auditorium and a classroom wing opened in 1956. The district's name changed to the current one effective September 1, 1978. In 1997 and 2002 a library and gymnasium/multipurpose facility were built, respectively. In 1999 the library's addition, a classroom called Room 12, was installed.
