= Teresa Lozano Long =

American educator and philanthropist (1928–2021)

- Born: Teresa Lozano; July 20, 1928; Premont, Texas
- Died: March 21, 2021 (aged 92)
- Education: University of Texas at Austin
- Occupations: Educator and philanthropist
- Spouse: Joe R. Long (1958-2021)

Teresa Altagracia Lozano Long (July 20, 1928 – March 21, 2021) was an educator and philanthropist, who supported arts and education in Austin, Texas.

Long was raised on a dairy farm in Premont, Texas, where she graduated as valedictorian at Premont High School in 1945. She attended the University of Texas at Austin, earning a bachelor's degree in 1948 and a master's in education in 1951. Long became a teacher in Alice, Texas, where she met attorney Joe R. Long, whom she married in 1958. They moved back to Austin, where she earned a doctorate in physical education in 1965.

In 1999, Long and her husband founded the Long Foundation, using proceeds from the sale of First State Bank, where Mr. Long had been the Chairman, to Norwest. They pledged an endowment gift of $10 million to support the Institute of Latin American Studies at the University of Texas, which was renamed the Teresa Lozano Long Institute of Latin American Studies. By 2004, they had endowed 100 scholarships for Hispanic students in different fields and departments. In 2005, they were jointly awarded the Texas Medal for the Arts. They also pledged $20 million for the renovation of Austin's Lester E. Palmer Auditorium, which was renamed the Joe R. and Teresa Lozano Long Center for the Performing Arts. The Longs also donated extensively to the University of Texas Health Science Center at San Antonio, and the medical school was renamed the Joe R. and Teresa Lozano Long School of Medicine after a $25 million gift in 2017.

Long was inducted into the Texas Women's Hall of Fame in 2010. Also that year, she and her husband received the Presidential Citation Award from the University of Texas at Austin. She was appointed to the National Council advising the National Endowment for the Arts in 2002, and she was awarded the National Humanities Medal in 2019. Upon receiving the award, she said, "I wish really it was given to my husband and me, since we do everything together."
