= Tamon =

Tamon or Tamón may refer to:

== People ==
- Tamon George (born 1987), Canadian former football player
- Tamon Hasegawa (born 1943), Japanese politician
- Tamon Honda (born 1963), Japanese professional and Olympic wrestler
- Tamon Yamaguchi (1892–1942), Japanese rear admiral
- Jirō Tamon (1878–1934), Japanese lieutenant general

== Other uses ==
- Tamón, a parish of Carreño, Asturias, Spain
- short form of Tamonten, Japanese for Vaiśravaṇa, a Buddhist god
- Tamon Fukuhara, title character of the manga series Tamon's B-Side

== See also ==
- Taman (disambiguation)
