= Carrio (disambiguation) =

Carrio is a civil parish in Laviana, Asturias, Spain.

Carrio, Carrío and Carrió may also refer to:

== People ==
- Adrian Carrio (born 1989), American race car driver
- Adrián Carrio (born 1986), Spanish jazz pianist
- Elisa Carrió (born 1956), Argentine politician
- Orlando Carrió (1955–2002), Argentine actor
- Pedro Carrío (born 1970), Cuban swimmer

== Places ==
- Carrió (Carreño), a civil parish in Asturias, Spain
