= David Olivera =

David Olivera (born May 30, 1972, in Santa Cruz de Tenerife, Canary Islands) is a photographer and director of photography from Tenerife, Spain.

== Artistic career ==
Active Member of The Society of Camera Operators (SOC) from 2020.

His artistic and professional career has led him to work and develop projects in Europe, America and Africa.

He is the director and cinematographer of the documentary CINCUENTA a road trip between Los Angeles, California to Alaska, filmed in 2022 and expected to be exhibited in the autumn of 2023.

He is the curator and director of the photographic exhibition Limbo, displaying the work of the artist Juan Carlos Fresnadillo at Tenerife Space of the Arts (TEA).

He is the director of the company FOTHOTEL, dedicated to photography and cinema advertising for hotels and tourist establishments.

His work The Forgotten People, developed in Sahrawi refugee camps in Tindouf, Algeria, received the Eva Fernández Award for Artistic Creation 2007 from the government of Tenerife Island, Spain.

In 2010 he was selected to participate in the prestigious Festival of Photography, FOTOFEST, in Houston, USA. Taking part in the Portfolio Review section gave him the opportunity to contact several art galleries in America and Asia to develop new projects.

He was the director of photography and camera operator on the documentary The Land of the Blue Men, 35 years Later (2010) on Rios TV, shot in Algeria, Morocco, Western Sahara and the Canary Islands.

He was the producer of the film Soldiers in the Shadows (2009), shot in New York City, also performing the functions of camera operator (second unit), first assistant director, and still photographer.

He has published five art books: San Borondón: la isla descubierta (2005), Armadura de Tabaiba (2006), Soldados en la Sombra, David Olivera diary (2008), Madagascar 1906 (2013), and Dakar el viaje inesperado (2015).

His artistic work has been exhibited in places like the Canary Islands, Barcelona, New York, Utrecht, Ghent, and Brussels.

== Filmography ==
=== Director of photography ===
- Cincuenta (2023)'. Feature Film Documentary by David Olivera.
- Prejuicios (2015)'. Short Film by Isidro González.
- El Lamero (2013)'. Corporative Video by Lameros del Barranco.
- Sheila & Tom'. Short Film by Pablo Mederos.
- El País de los Hombres Azules, 35 años después (2010)'. A documentary by Ríos TV.
- Giro al Infinito (2009)'. Video Creation by Guillermo Ríos for II Canary Biennale: Architecture, Art and Landscape.
- Albergue de Anaga (2009)'. Spot by Calima Digital.
- Fuerteventura (2008)' Documentary by Ríos TV.
- La Laguna, Cinco Siglos de Historia (2008)'. A documentary by Ríos TV.
- Intramuros (2005)'. Video Creation by Roberto Torres. Nómadas Dance Company.
- Canarios Dentro, Canarios Fuera (2004)'. Video Creation by Lola Pérez.
- La Huella y La Senda (2004)'. A documentary by Ríos TV.
- La Casa del Agua (1999)'. A short film by Laura Machado.
- Pasa la Vida (1997)'. Short Film shot in Super 8mm by Tony González.

=== Camera operator ===
- Waking Karma (2023)'. Camera Operator. Feature film by Carlos Montaner and Liz Werner.
- El vuelo del Guirre (2007)'. Second Unit Camera Operator. Feature film by Teodoro y Santiago Ríos.
- La Despedida (2006)'. Camera Operator. A short film by Alexis Hernández.
- Nelson, el Ataque (2004)'. Camera Operator. Documentary by Roberto Ríos.

=== Other roles ===
- Intacto (2001). Making of Camera Operator. Feature Film by Juan Carlos Fresnadillo.
- Los Guanches (1997). Second Assistant Camera. A documentary by Ríos TV.
- La Isla del Infierno (1997). Set Coordinator. Feature Film by Javier Fernández Caldas.
- Piel de Cactus (1996). Second Camera Assistant. Feature Film by Alberto Omar & Aurelio Carnero.
- La Raya (1995). Third Assistant Art Director. Short Film by Andrés Koppel.
- Una sencilla canción de R&R (1995). Still Photography. Short Film by Teddy Murphy.

== Photography exhibitions ==
- "Dakar el viaje inesperado", Ex-convent de Santo Domingo, La Laguna, Spain 2015.
- "Madagascar 1906", Museum of Nature and Man, Santa Cruz de Tenerife, Spain 2013.
- "El mar desde mi isla", group exhibition "El mar y sus sentidos". Tenerife (Spain), Las Palmas (Spain), Ghent (Netherlands) and Brussels (Belgium) 2011.
- "Tiempo". Ex-convent del Carmen. Jalisco. Mexico 2010.
- "Encuentro con Africa". Festival Atlántico Sonoro, La Gomera, Spain 2010.
- "Rastros". Casa Los Coroneles (Fuerteventura). Casa Salazar (La Palma), Spain 2009.
- "Andanzas". Sala de Arte Casa Elder. Tenerife, Spain 2009.
- "Explorando Espejismos". Bienal de Arte de Lanzarote. Islas Canarias, Spain 2007.
- «Sueños rotos». Sala de Arte de Caja Canarias, La Laguna. Spain 2007.
- «Viaje al interior», part of this exhibition has been shown in the art gallery Fotosphere Gallery in the city of New York, USA 2006.
- «San Borondón, la isla descubierta». 2005, La Recova, Tenerife, Spain. Sala de arte Cicca, Las Palmas, Spain. Cabildo de La Palma, Spain 2006, Convento de Santo Domingo, La Laguna, Spain 2006.
- «Islas Raíces». 2005, Sala de Arte Cajacanarias, Tenerife, Spain. Sala de Arte La Regenta, Las Palmas, Spain.
- «Espacios abiertos». 2005, Sala de Arte Fundación Maphre Guanarteme. La Laguna, Spain. Sala de Arte Fundación Maphre Guanarteme, Las Palmas, Spain.
- «Memoria del Sur». 2005, Sala de Arte de Casa Elder, Santa Cruz de Tenerife, Spain. Fotonoviembre de 2005.
- «Viajes imaginarios». Casa de la Cultura Tacoronte, Spain. Fotonoviembre de 2003.
- «Ella, ello». La Laguna, Spain. Fotonoviembre de 2001.
- «Ventana al cielo». Casa de Lercaro, La Laguna, Spain. Festival de la Luz 2000.
- «El ojo del cíclope». Primavera fotográfica de Cataluña, Barcelona, Spain 2000. Museo se Arte Moderno de Tarragona, Tarragona, Spain 2000.
- «Retratos». Santa Cruz de Tenerife, Spain. Fotonoviembre de 1999.
- «El rey dormido». Sala de Arte Cajacanarias, Puerto de la Cruz, Spain 1998.
- «Astilleros». Casa de la Cultura de Tacoronte, Spain. Fotonoviembre de 1997.
- «Soledades». Group exhibition. Center for Photography, Tenerife, Spain 1995.
- «Interfiut». Group exhibition. Center for Photography, Tenerife, Spain 1994.
- «Utopía». Tacoronte, Spain. Fotonoviembre de 1993.
- «Rincones de Candelaria». Candelaria, Spain 1992.
