= El Valle (Carreño) =

Parish in Carreño, Asturias, Spain

- Parish
- Location within Spain
- Coordinates: 43.483333°N 5.533333°W
- Country: Spain
- Autonomous community: Asturias
- Province: Asturias
- Municipality: Carreño

El Valle is one of 12 parishes (administrative divisions) in Carreño, a municipality within the province and autonomous community of Asturias, in northern Spain.

The parroquia is 7.03 km^{2} (2.71 sq mi) in size, with a population of 257 (INE 2007). The postal code is 33438.

== Villages and hamlets ==
- El Cuitu
- Fontefría
- Llacín
- La Maquila
- La Mata
- Nozalín
- El Palacio
- Ramos
- Santolaya
- La Sierra
- Sopeñes
- La Torre
- La Vega
- Xanes
- Zancornio
