= Llorgozana =

Parish in Carreño, Asturias, Spain

- Parish
- Location within Spain
- Coordinates: 43.55°N 5.8°W
- Country: Spain
- Autonomous community: Asturias
- Province: Asturias
- Municipality: Carreño

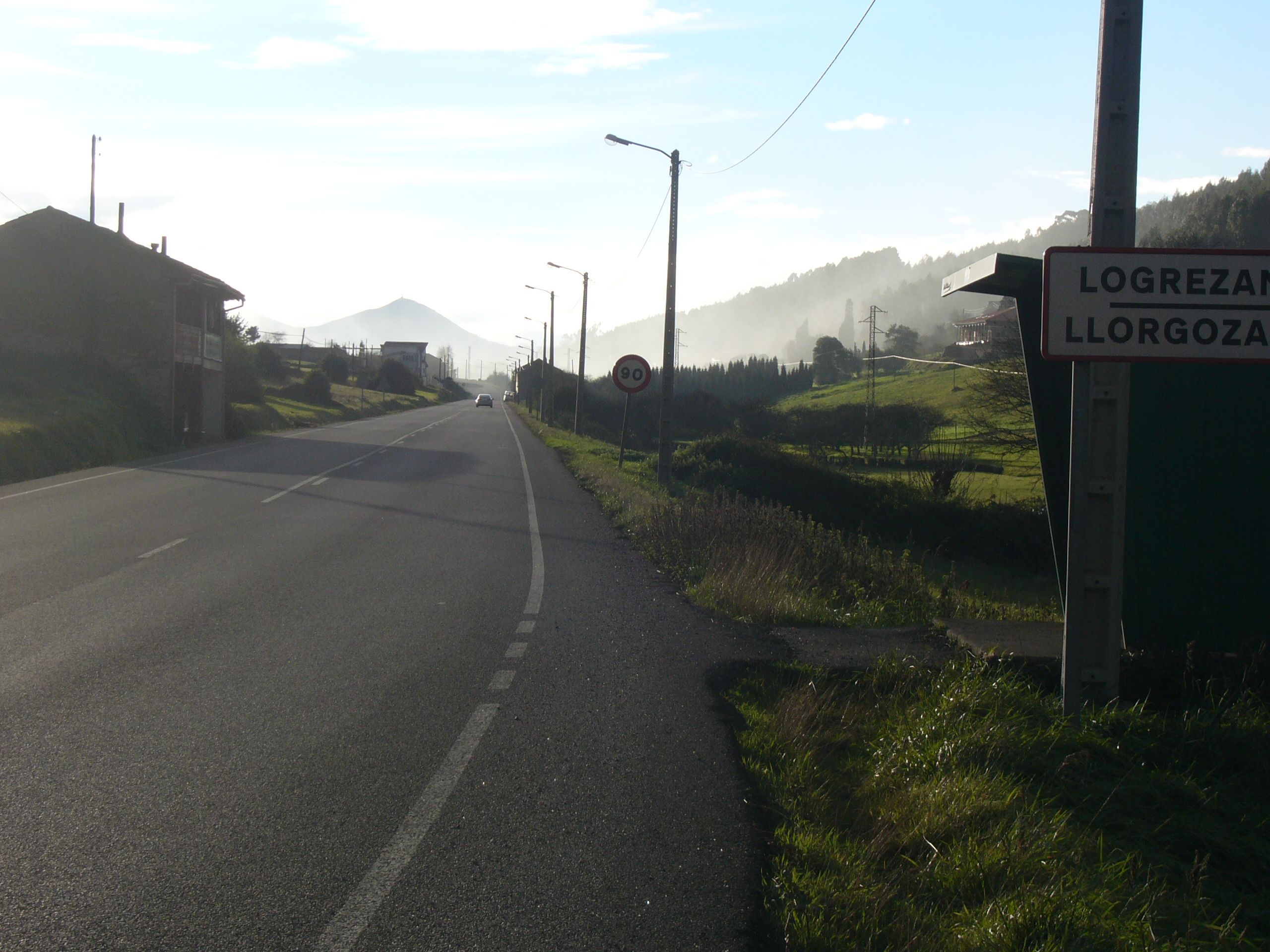
AS-19 road in Llorgozana

Llorgozana (Logrezana in Spanish) is one of 12 parishes (administrative divisions) in Carreño, a municipality within the province and autonomous community of Asturias, in northern Spain.

The parroquia is 11.28 km^{2} (4.36 sq mi) in size, with a population of 391 (INE 2007). The postal code is 33438.

== Culture ==
- Castle of la Barrera en Castiello
- Palace of los Carreño-Alas
- Church of Santa María la Real de Llorgozana
- Chapel of del Espíritu Santu in Castiello
- House of Busto Valdés
- House of Fernández Porley in El Fundial
- House of Muñiz de Pola o de Solís Carreño in Posada
- Edifice of les Escueles de Llorgozana

== Villages and hamlets ==
- Cabovilla
- Castiello
- El Cantu
- El Cardusu
- El Fundial
- El Lloral
- El Monte
- El Pedregal
- Fontefría
- L'Arena
- La Barca
- La Barrera
- La Cavada
- La Granda
- La Llegua
- La Machina
- La Menudina
- Llantero
- Los Tayos
- Posada
- Sebades
