= Ambás (Carreño) =

- Parish
- Location within Spain
- Coordinates: 43.533333°N 5.8°W
- Country: Spain
- Autonomous community: Asturias
- Province: Asturias
- Municipality: Carreño

Ambás is one of 12 parishes (administrative divisions) in Carreño, a municipality within the province and autonomous community of Asturias, in northern Spain.

The parroquia is 3.23 km^{2} (1.25 sq mi) in size, with a population of 225 (INE 2007). The postal code is 33438.

== Villages and hamlets ==
- Ambás
- Güernu
- El Monticu
- El Rodil
