= Don Pedro Jaramillo =

Early 20th-Century Curandero and Folk Saint

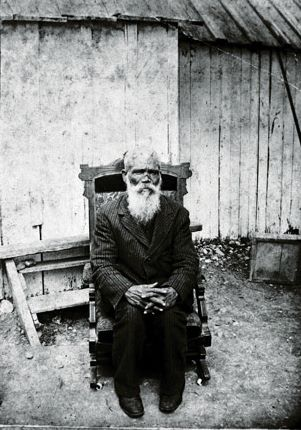
- Don Pedro Jaramillo, curandero faith healer from South Texas

El Mero Jefe, Healer of Los Olmos, Curandero, Healer
- Born: Guadalajara, Mexico
- Died: 1907; Starr County, Texas
- Venerated in: Folk Catholicism
- Patronage: Cures, good health, fortune, healing, protection from diseases

Don Pedro Jaramillo was a curandero and folk saint from the South Texas Valley region. He was known as "the healer of Los Olmos Creek" and "el mero jefe" (English: the real chief) of the curanderos.

== Origin ==
Jaramillo was born in Guadalajara, Jalisco, Mexico to Purépecha Indigenous parents. The Purépecha are commonly known as the Tarasco indigenous people of Mexico. Don Pedro Jaramillo died in modern-day Brooks County, Texas on July 3, 1907. Jaramillo first came to notice when he arrived at the Los Olmos ranch near Falfurrias, Texas, announced he was a curandero, and began treating the Mexican families in the region. At the height of his career, families from as far away as New York City would travel to seek help from Jaramillo.

Jaramillo's story as a curandero begins when he was suffering from a nose ailment and as a cure, daubed his nose with mud at the edge of a pool. Three days of this self-prescribed treatment cured the ailment; however, it left Jaramillo with an identifying scar on his nose. On the third night of this treatment, Jaramillo believed he heard a voice telling him God had given him the power to heal. Testing such power, he prescribed a tepid bath to his master which was said to heal his ailment.

The first accounts of his cures and powers were collected and printed in 1934 in Spanish; they were later in 1951 translated to English. Don Pedro is not only noted for his healing, but also his generosity. In Alice, Texas, it was recorded that he would sometimes buy $500 worth of goods at a time, simply to feed the poor. On his travels, Don Pedro was accompanied by a friend, Teofilo Barraza. Because of Don Pedro's popularity, large groups of people would camp at Los Olmos Creek awaiting his return from a curing trip.

There is a shrine at his burial site on FM Highway 1418 in Falfurrias and also a state historical marker. The Texas State historical marker was dedicated in 1971 and is the first in Texas to be written in both English and Spanish. His popularity continues and he has even had songs written about him.

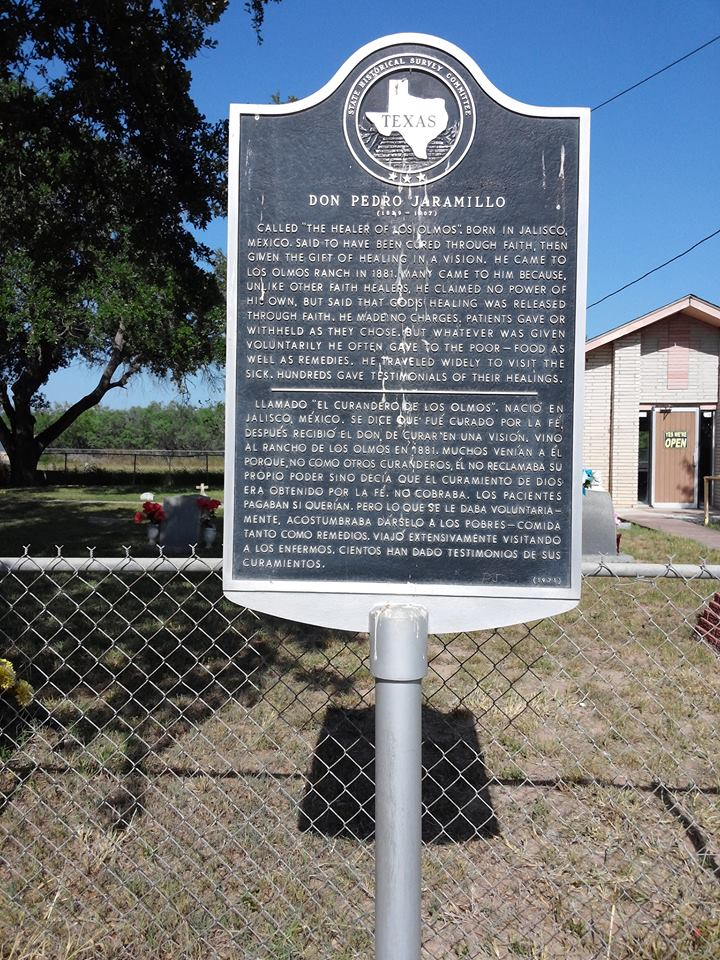
First Bilingual Texas State Roadside historical marker 1971

== Themes ==
In many of Jaramillo's treatments the number nine plays a prominent role. For example, he would often prescribe treatments to be taken for nine consecutive nights or in quantities of nine. There are also stories of people who did not follow his instructions or changed his prescription and then failed to recover; in these tellings, only those who followed his treatments exactly as prescribed achieved complete recovery. Jaramillo's cures were often miraculous in nature, even to the point of curing paralysis.

Water has also been identified as a central theme in Jaramillo's cures, often requiring the ailing person to drink water for a specified length of time or bathing in water a certain number of days. The top cures he prescribed all involved water and bathing.

== Other abilities ==
Some of the tales portray Pedro Jaramillo as clairvoyant. He would know inherently if someone was lying about an illness or ailment. In one story, he knew of a conversation that took place without him present. In 2019, former University of the Incarnate Word Master's graduate, Alcario Cary Cadena wrote The Curandero: The Life and Times of Don Pedro Jaramillo, a Texas Legend a fictional/supernatural book based on Jaramillo. In 2022 Alcario Cary Cadena wrote his book into a screenplay entitled The Curandero. In Mexican culture, Jaramillo is displayed prominently in adorning homes in the form of paintings and statues.
