= Carreño =

- Municipality
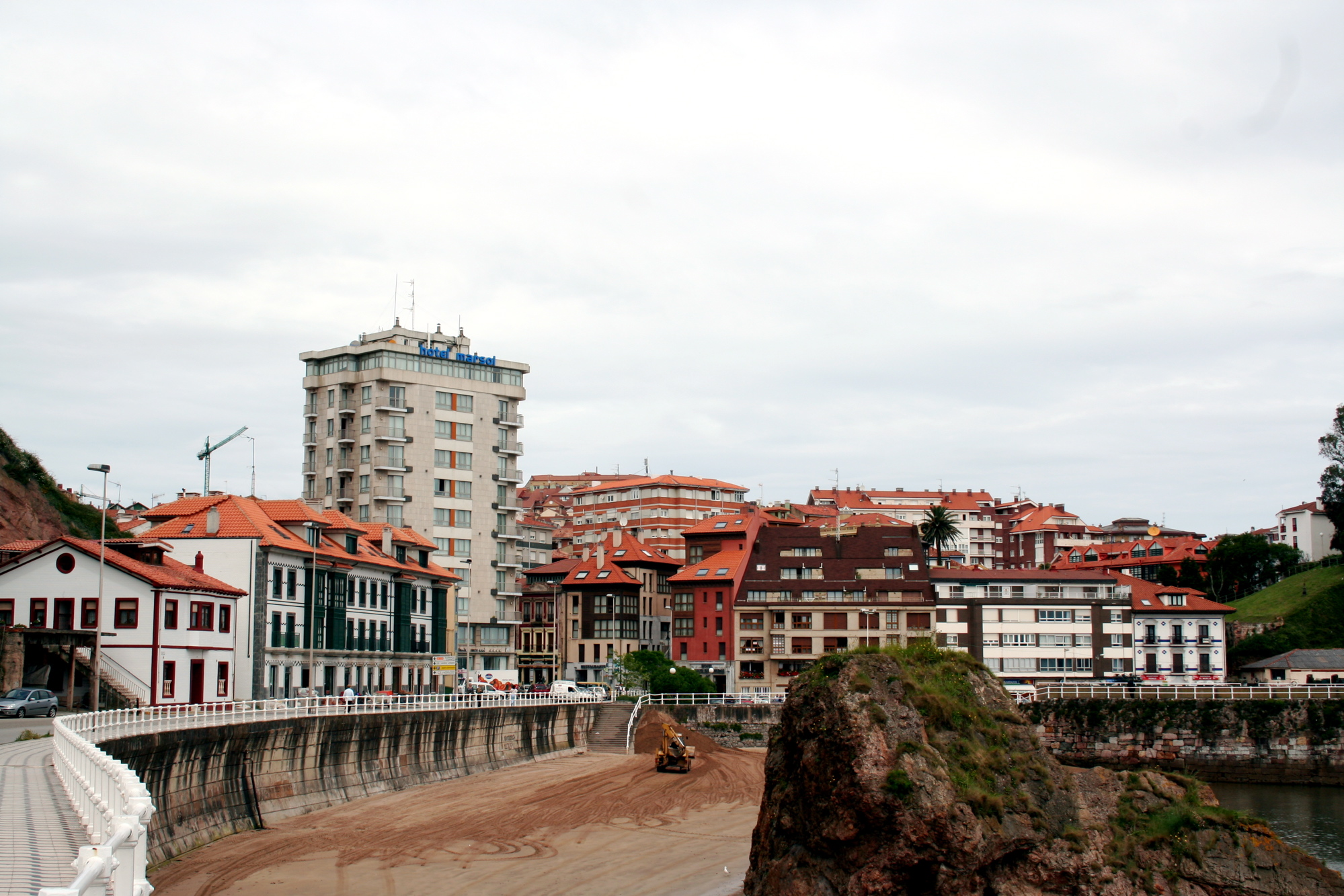
- View over Candás

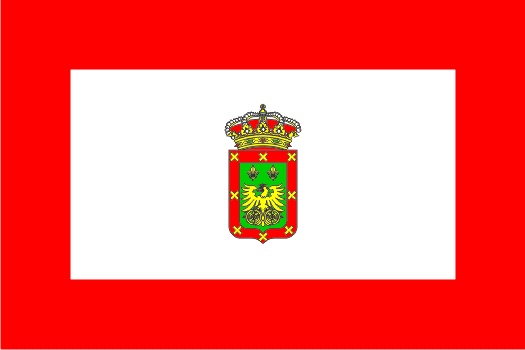
- Flag Coat of arms

- Location of Carreño

- Location in Spain
- Coordinates: 43°32′55″N 5°47′23″W
- Country: Spain
- Autonomous community: Asturias
- Province: Asturias
- Comarca: Gijón
- Capital: Candás

Government
  - Alcalde: Manuel Ángel Riego (PSOE)

Area
  - Total: 66.70 km^{2} (25.75 sq mi)
- Elevation: 0 m (0 ft)

Population (2025-01-01)
  - Total: 10,292
  - Density: 154.3/km^{2} (399.6/sq mi)
- Time zone: UTC+1 (CET)
  - Summer (DST): UTC+2 (CEST)
- Postal code: 33430
- Official language(s): Asturian
- Website: Official website

Carreño is a municipality in the autonomous community of the Principality of Asturias, Spain. It is bordered by Corvera de Asturias on the west, Gozón on the north, the Cantabrian Sea on the north and east, and Gijón on the east and south. Its capital is Candás.

== History ==
Historical population
Year	Pop.	±% p.a.
1842	4,982	—
1860	6,052	+1.09%
1877	6,271	+0.21%
1887	7,091	+1.24%
1900	7,533	+0.47%
1910	8,962	+1.75%
1920	8,876	−0.10%
1930	10,256	+1.46%
1940	10,009	−0.24%
1950	9,931	−0.08%
1960	11,128	+1.14%
1970	11,529	+0.35%
1980	11,470	−0.05%
1990	11,009	−0.41%
2000	10,557	−0.42%
2001	10,567	+0.09%
2002	10,527	−0.38%
2003	10,431	−0.91%
2004	10,435	+0.04%
2005	10,716	+2.69%
2006	10,842	+1.18%
2007	10,826	−0.15%
Source: Instituto Nacional de Estadística de España

As characteristic of other sites in Asturias, artifacts from the Neolithic era were also found in Carreño. Tumuli, dolmens and hill forts in the region provide evidence for the 100,000-year-old history of the area.

== Parishes ==
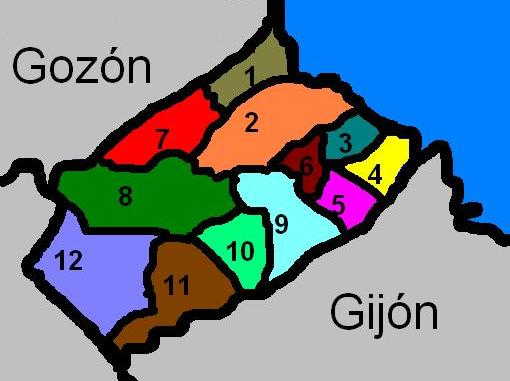
Parroquias Map

(The number preceding the parish name refers to its location on the parroquias map)

1. Candás (capital)
2. Perlora
3. Albandi
4. Carrió
5. Prevera
6. Priendes
7. El Pieloro
8. Llorgozana
9. Quimarán
10. El Valle
11. Ambás
12. Tamón

== Politics ==
Municipal elections
Partido	1979	1983	1987	1991	1995	1999	2003	2007	2011	2015
FSA-PSOE	4	3	3	3	4	7	5	6	6	6
CD / AP / PP	1	4	2	3	5	4	3	4	4	4
Somos										4
PCE / IU-BA / IU-The Greens	5	10	9	10	7	3	3	2	1	3
BA							3	2	1	
Unidá									1	
FAC									2	0
UICA							4	3	1	
CA-UN									1	0
PCPE								0	1	0
URAS						3	1	1	0	
PAS-UNA / PAS / URAS-PAS				0	0	0	0	1	0	
UCD / CDS	5	0	3	1						
CAS					1					
AA / Andecha por Carreño					0	0	1	1		
Independents	2									
Total	17	17	17	17	17	17	17	17	17	17

== Culture ==
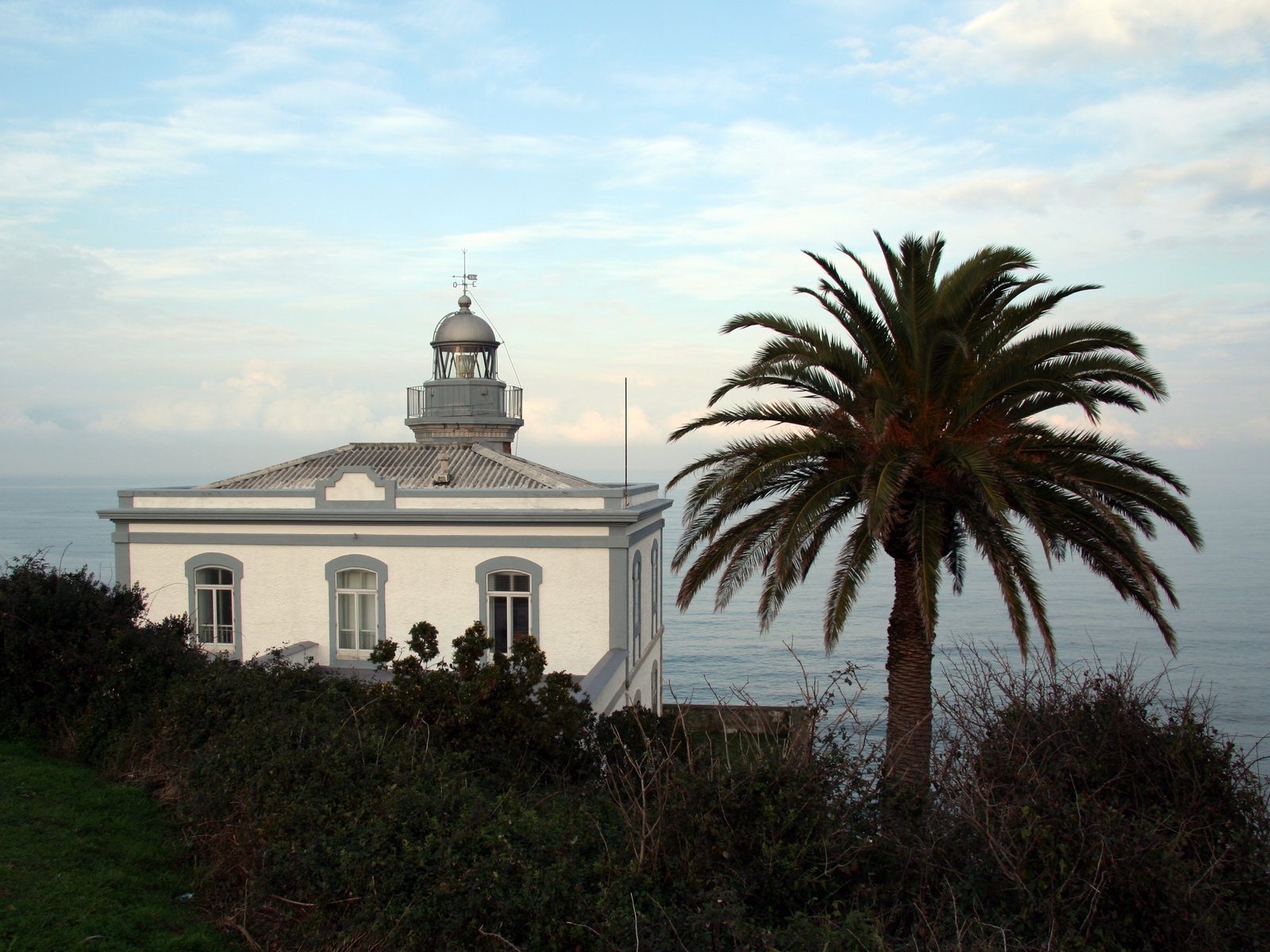
Faro de Candás

- La iglesia de San Félix church built under Fruela II in the 9th century
- La iglesia de Santa María de Logrezana church finished in the 19th century.
- La iglesia de Santa María de Piedeloro church built in the 13th century
- La iglesia parroquial de Ambás parish church from the 18th century
- La ermita de San Antonio hermitage from the 16th century
- El palacio de Estrada Mora palace from the 16th century

== Notable people ==
- Antón de Marirreguera, 17th-century writer, and one of the first to write in Asturian.
- Juan Carreño de Miranda (March 1614 - September 1685) was a Spanish painter of the Baroque period.

== See also ==
- List of municipalities in Asturias
