= Quimarán =

Parish in Carreño, Asturias, Spain

- Parish
- Location within Spain
- Coordinates: 43.55°N 5.75°W
- Country: Spain
- Autonomous community: Asturias
- Province: Asturias
- Municipality: Carreño

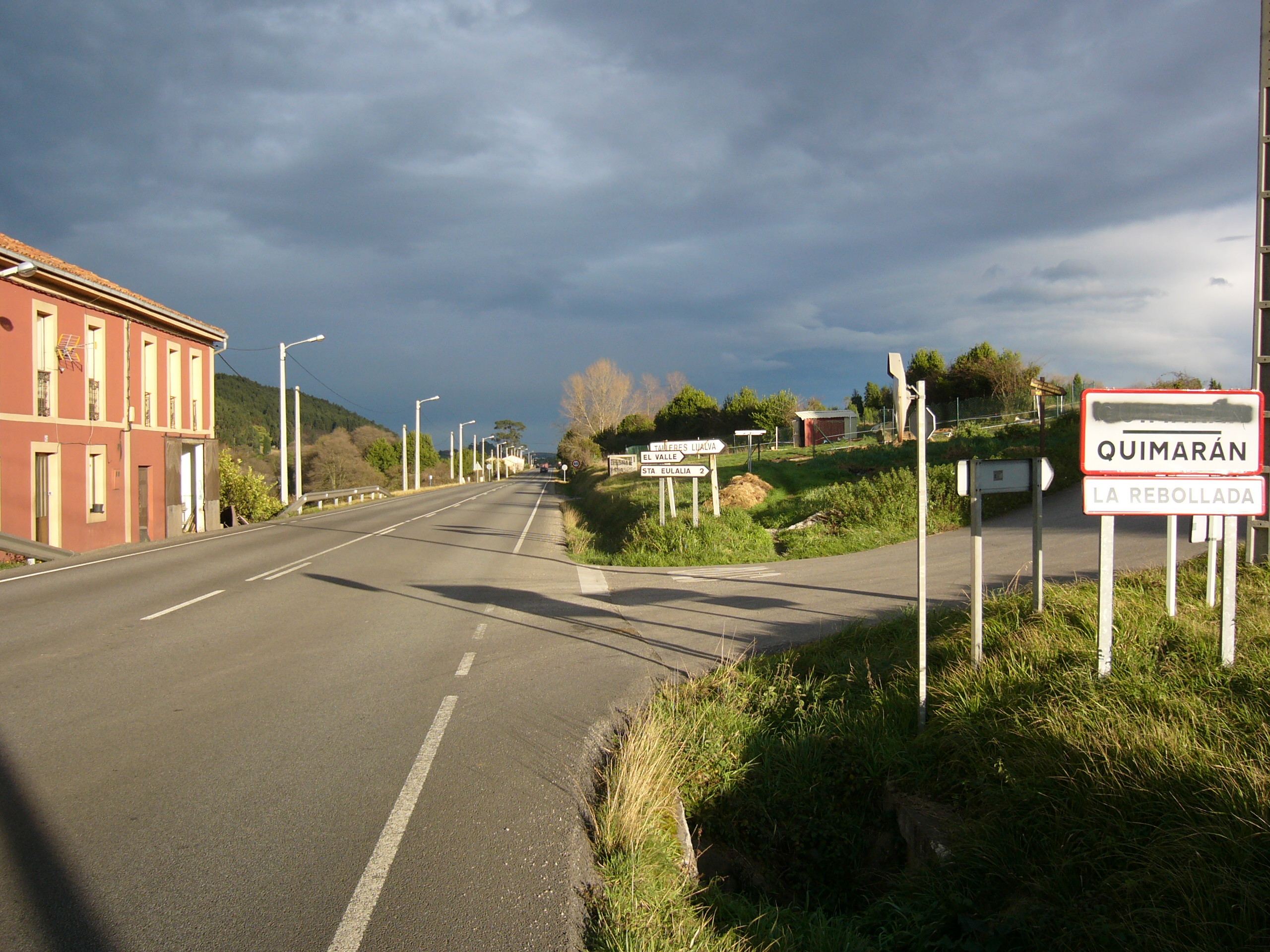
AS-19 road in Quimarán

Quimarán (Guimarán in Spanish) is one of 12 parishes (administrative divisions) in Carreño, a municipality within the province and autonomous community of Asturias, in northern Spain.

The parroquia is 5.03 km^{2} (1.94 sq mi) in size, with a population of 372 (INE 2007). The postal code is 33438.

== Villages and hamlets ==
- La Cespedera
- El Fondo
- Mazaneda
- El Monte
- Naves
- La Rebollada
- San Pablo
- Villar
