= Falfurrias High School =

Public school in Texas, United States

Location
- 100 West Jersey Drive; Falfurrias, Texas 78355-0589; United States; 27.2322°N 98.1525°W

Information
- School type: Public high school
- School district: Brooks County Independent School District
- Principal: Richard Wright
- Grades: 9-12
- Enrollment: 385 (2023-2024)
- Colors: Green & White
- Athletics conference: UIL Class AAA
- Mascot: Jersey/Belle
- Website: fhs.bcisd.us

Falfurrias High School is a public high school located in Falfurrias, Texas (USA) and classified as a 3A school by the UIL. It is part of the Brooks County Independent School District located in northern Brooks County which serves students county-wide. For the 2024–2025 school year, the school was given a "D" by the Texas Education Agency.

High school aged students living in La Gloria Independent School District may attend Falfurrias High or Premont High of Premont Independent School District.

== Athletics ==
The Falfurrias Jerseys compete in the following sports

- Baseball
- Basketball
- Cross Country
- Football
- Golf
- Powerlifting
- Softball
- Tennis
- Track and Field
- Volleyball

=== State Titles ===
- Baseball
  - 1991(3A)
- Boys Cross Country
  - 1972(B), 1973(B), 1980(4A)
- Boys Track
  - 1949(1A)
