= Premont High School =

Public high school in Premont, Texas

Premont Collegiate High School

Location
- 400 South Elaine Street; Premont, Texas 78375-1302; United States; 27.353533°N 98.132477°W

Information
- School type: Public high school
- Established: 1971
- School district: Premont Independent School District
- Principal: Claudett Garcia
- Teaching staff: 28.69 (on an FTE basis)
- Grades: 6th-12th
- Enrollment: 359 (2023-2024)
- Student to teacher ratio: 12.51
- Colors: Red & Black
- Athletics: UIL Class AA
- Mascot: Cowboy/Cowgirl
- Yearbook: The Round-Up
- Website: pchs.premontisd.net

Premont Collegiate High School, formerly known as Premont Secondary School, is a public high school located in Premont, Texas, and classified as a 2A school by the University Interscholastic League. It is part of the Premont Independent School District.

== Athletics ==
Football and other sports were suspended by the district in 2012 due to low academic ratings. All sports have returned.

Boys cross country state titles (5)

  - 1998(2A), 1999(2A), 2000(2A), 2001(2A), 2002(2A)

== Notable alumni ==
- José Manuel Lozano (1998), member of the Texas House of Representatives.
- Teresa Lozano Long (1945), philanthropist. She was awarded the National Humanities Medal in 2019.
