= Rios, Texas =

Unincorporated community in Texas, US

Rios is an unincorporated community in Duval County, Texas, United States. According to the Handbook of Texas, the community had an estimated population of 100 in 2000.

== Geography ==
Rios is located at 27°27′06″N 98°15′54″W (27.4517023, -98.2650068). It is situated along FM 1329 in southeastern Duval County, approximately 13 miles southeast of Benavides, 16 miles northeast of Premont, and 21 miles south of San Diego.

Although Rios lacks any official boundaries, many locals consider the stretch of FM 1329 between County Road 233 to the south and Victor's Farm and Ranch Store to the north, as part of the community.

== History ==
Permanent settlement in the area antedates the independent Republic of Texas and Texas statehood, but a community did not begin to develop at the site until the 1890s. The community was initially known as La Gloria, but by the time a post office was established in the late 1930s, that name had already been taken. Felipe V. Rios, who eventually became postmaster, then suggested the name Vera after a local rancher, Saturnino Vera. That name, however, was also in use by another community in northern Texas. His final submission was the name Rios, after his family, whose roots in the area date back to the late 19th century, which was approved by postal authorities.

Rios had an estimated population of 75 with four businesses in the early 1940s. The population remained at that level for the remainder of the 20th century. By 2000, the community was dispersed and the number of inhabitants had risen to 100.

== Education ==
Public education in the community of Rios is provided by the Premont Independent School District. All of the district's campuses are located in the city of Premont, approximately 16 miles southeast of Rios. Premont ISD has served Rios since the late 1960s.
