= Albandi =

- Parish
- Location within Spain
- Coordinates: 43.566667°N 5.75°W
- Country: Spain
- Autonomous community: Asturias
- Province: Asturias
- Municipality: Carreño

Albandi is one of 12 parishes (administrative divisions) in Carreño, a municipality within the province and autonomous community of Asturias, in northern Spain.

The parroquia is 1.82 km^{2} (0.70 sq mi) in size, with a population of 587 (INE 2007). The postal code is 33492.

== Villages ==
- La Calera
- El Convento
- La Granda
- El Monte Calera
- El Monte Morís
- La Peruyera
- Rica
- La Xana
- Xibares
- Caicorrida
- Poal de Albandi

== Notable residents ==
- Margarita Landi (1918–2004), journalist
