= Prevera =

Parish in Carreño, Asturias, Spain

- Parish
- Location within Spain
- Coordinates: 43.55°N 5.733333°W
- Country: Spain
- Autonomous community: Asturias
- Province: Asturias
- Municipality: Carreño

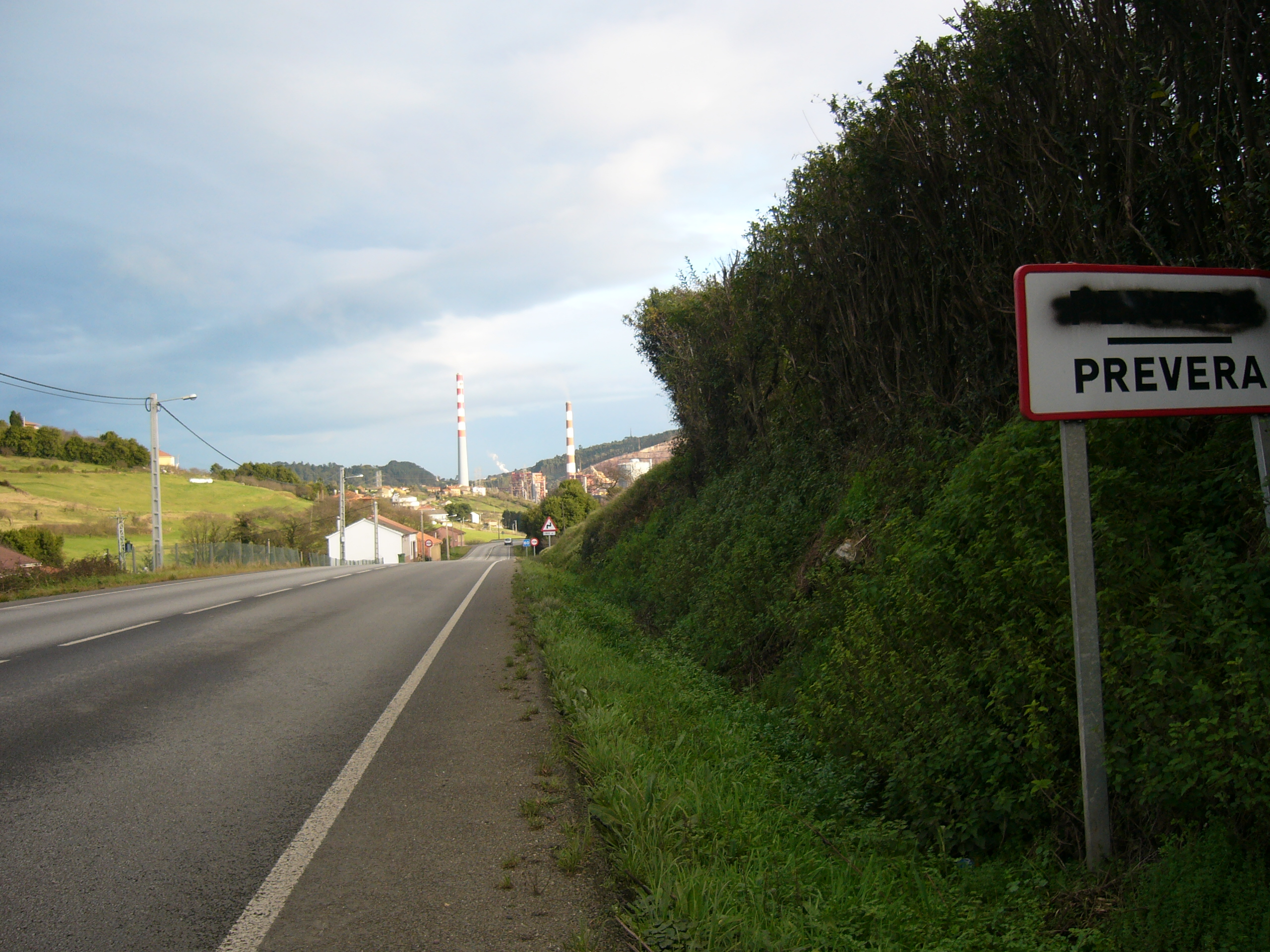
AS-19 road in Prevera

Prevera is one of 12 parishes (administrative divisions) in Carreño, a municipality within the province and autonomous community of Asturias, in northern Spain.

The parroquia is 5.74 km^{2} (2.22 sq mi) in size, with a population of 188 (INE 2007). The postal code is 33492.

== Villages and hamlets ==
- La Baragaña
- La Barquera
- Barreres
- La Cuesta
- L'Empalme
- Mazaneda
- El Monte
- Muniello
- Reconco
- El Riigu
- El Valle
- Xelaz
