= José Manuel Lozano =

Mexican-American restaurateur and politician (born 1980)

Member of the Texas House of Representatives from the 43rd district
- Incumbent
- Assumed office January 11, 2011
- Preceded by: Tara Rios Ybarra

Personal details
- Born: May 23, 1980 (age 46) Guadalajara, Mexico
- Party: Republican (since 2012); Democratic (until 2012)
- Spouse: Avelina Rodriguez Lozano
- Children: 3
- Education: University of Texas at Austin (BA); University of the Incarnate Word (MA)
- Occupation: Restaurateur; politician
- Website: Campaign website

José Manuel Lozano (born May 23, 1980), known as J. M. Lozano, is a member of the Texas House of Representatives from the 43rd district, which consists of the counties of Bee, Jim Wells, Kleberg, and San Patricio. A restaurateur, Lozano lives in Kingsville in Kleberg County with his wife, Avelina, and their three children. First elected to office as a Democratic politician, he switched parties in 2012 and is now a Republican. He owns Wingstop franchises in Alice, Calallen, Kingsville, and Portland.

== Early life and education ==
Lozano is the son of a medical doctor and has five sisters. He graduated from Premont High School in Premont, Texas, in 1998 and later received a Bachelor of Arts in government from the University of Texas at Austin. He interned for Carlos F. Truan in the Texas Senate. He also received a Master of Arts in administration from the University of the Incarnate Word.

== Political career ==
He is a member of the Eagle Ford Shale Caucus, Tourism Caucus, Rural Caucus, and House Republican Policy Committee, and at various times he has been appointed to the positions of Deputy Floor Leader, chairman of the Committee on Redistricting, and vice-chairman of the Committee on International Trade and has been appointed to several other committees.

In 2023, Lozano voted for the impeachment of Texas Attorney General Ken Paxton, but later expressed regret for his vote.

In 2025, Lozano sponsored a bill to ban gender affirming care for transgender individuals of all ages.

Texas House of Representatives
Preceded by Tara Rios Ybarra	Member of the Texas House of Representatives from District 43 (Kingsville); 2011–present	Succeeded by Incumbent
