= El Pieloro =

Parish in Carreño, Asturias, Spain

- Parish
- Location within Spain
- Coordinates: 43.566667°N 5.8°W
- Country: Spain
- Autonomous community: Asturias
- Province: Asturias
- Municipality: Carreño

El Pieloro (Spanish: Piedeloro) is one of 12 parishes (administrative divisions) in Carreño, a municipality within the province and autonomous community of Asturias, in northern Spain.

The parroquia is 5.83 km^{2} (2.25 sq mi) in size, with a population of 222 (INE 2007). The postal code is 33439.

== Villages and hamlets ==
- L'Alto la Ilesia
- Los Caleros
- El Cellero
- La Espeñada
- La Estación
- Llaneces
- El Llanu
- El Raitán
- El Rendaliego
- San Zabornín
- La Xunca
