= Candás =

- Parish
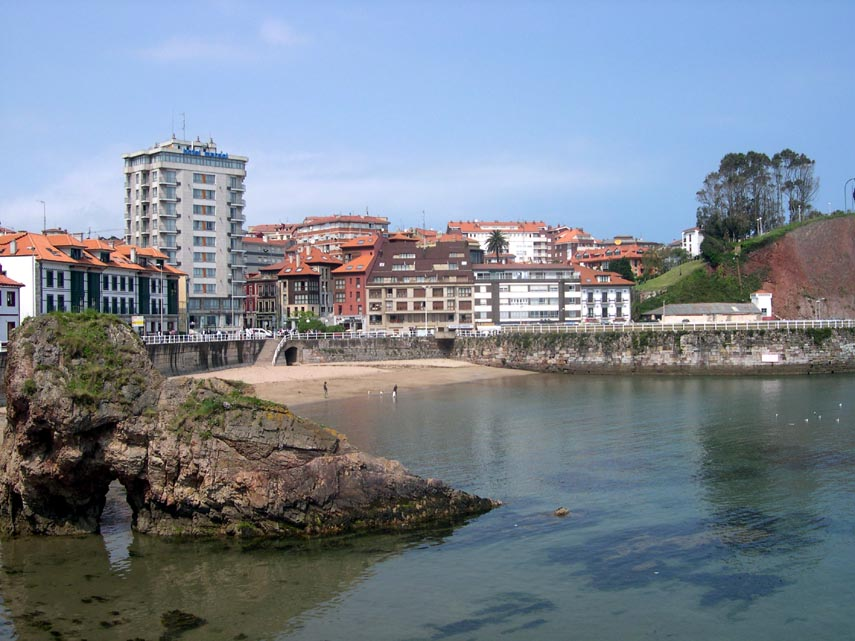
- View of Candás

- Location within Spain
- Coordinates: 43.590833°N 5.767222°W
- Country: Spain
- Autonomous community: Asturias
- Province: Asturias
- Municipality: Carreño

Population (2024)
  - Total: 7,320

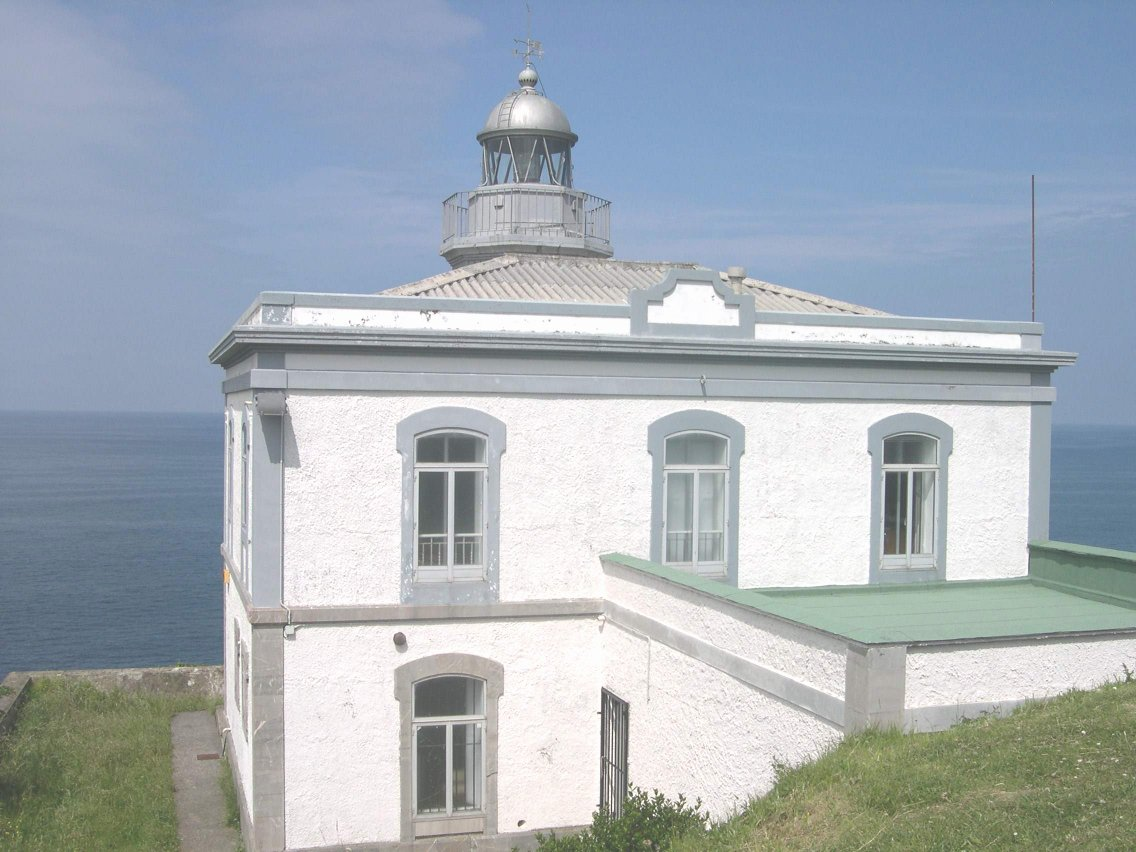
Lighthouse of Candás

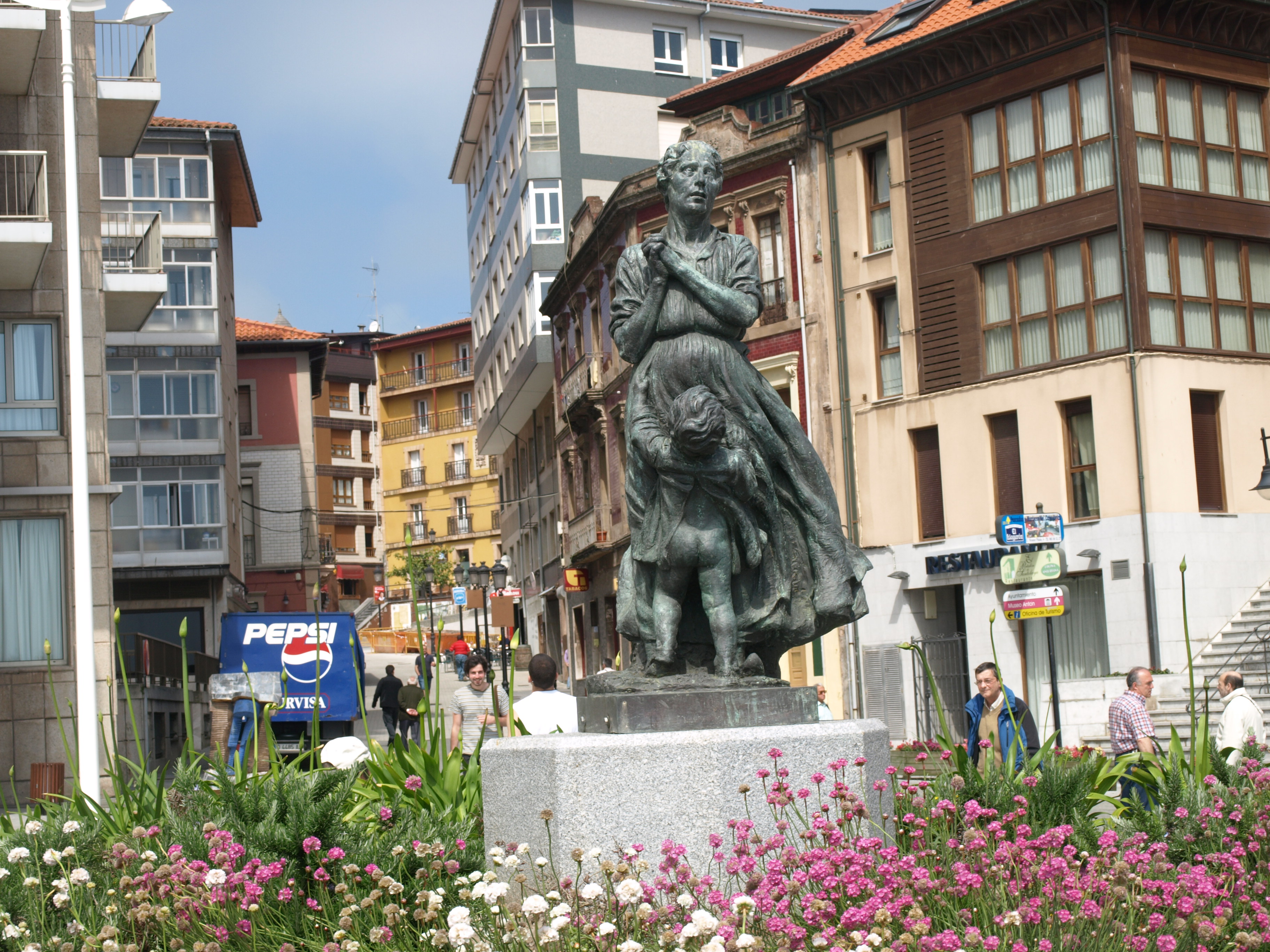
Statue of wife and child awaiting return of sailor

Candás is a small fishing town in the province and autonomous community of Asturias, in northern Spain. It's the capital of the municipality of Carreño.

It is one of 12 parishes (administrative divisions) in the municipality of Carreño. Situated at 39 m (128 ft) above sea level, it is 2.21 km^{2} (0.85 sq mi) in size, with a population of 6500 (INE 2009). The postal code is 33430.

This seafaring town has many places of tourist interest, such as the Antón Museum of Sculpture, a multisports centre and outdoor places, like Baragaña Square, the pier and more.

On the pier is located one of the most notable ice-cream shops of Carreño, 'Helados Helio Hermanos'. Founded in 1944, it sells ice cream and hand-made "turrones".
