= Priendes =

Parish in Carreño, Asturias, Spain

- Parish
- Location within Spain
- Coordinates: 43.566667°N 5.75°W
- Country: Spain
- Autonomous community: Asturias
- Province: Asturias
- Municipality: Carreño

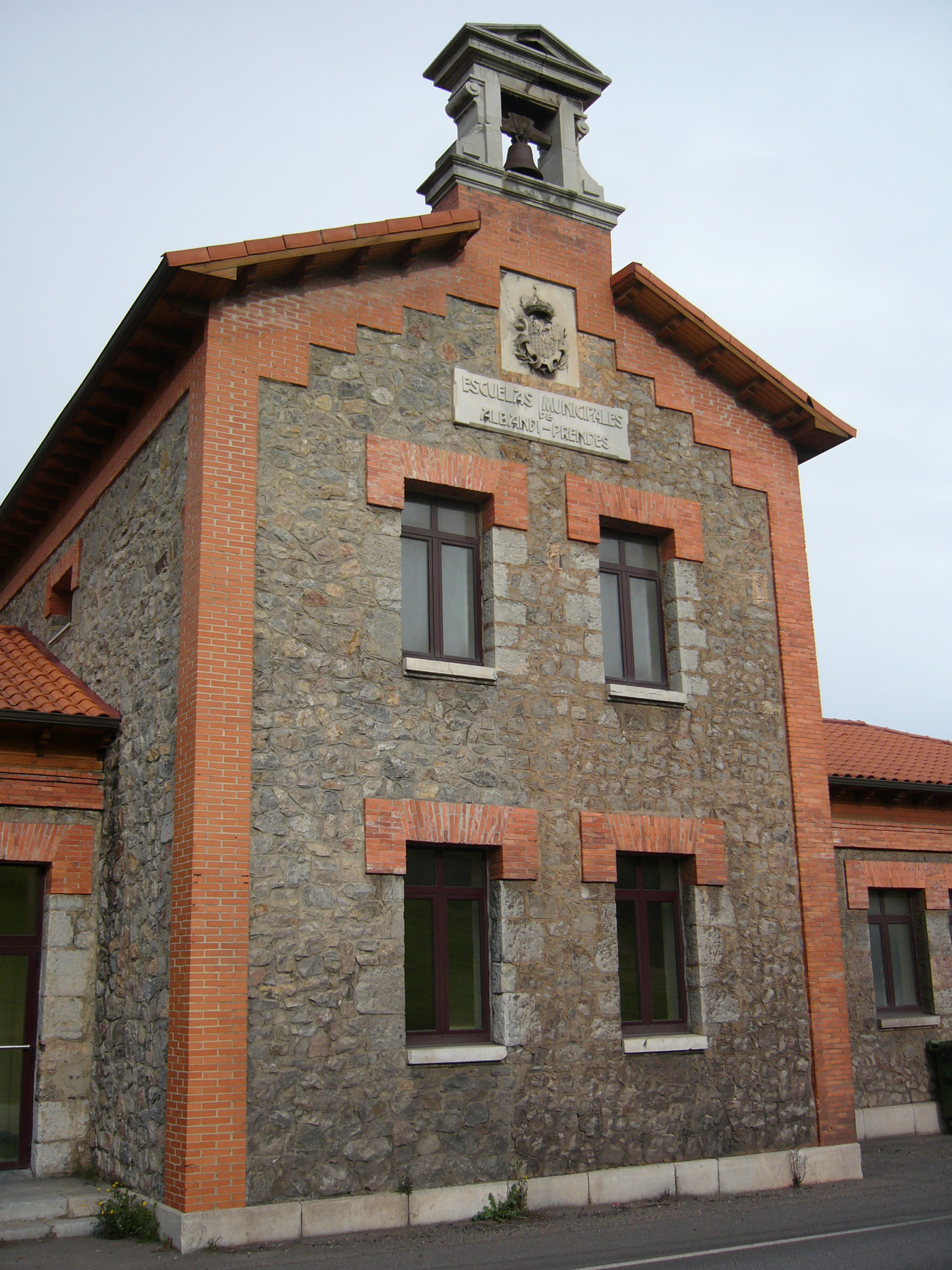
Old school in Priendes

Priendes is one of 12 parishes (administrative divisions) in Carreño, a municipality within the province and autonomous community of Asturias, in northern Spain.

The parroquia is 2.31 km^{2} (0.89 sq mi) in size, with a population of 111 (INE 2007). The postal code is 33438.

== Villages ==
- Bárzana
- El Cabu
- El Cantu
- Falmuria
- Pesgana
- Pinzales
- Polleo
- El Riistru
- San Pablo
