= Premont, Texas =

- City
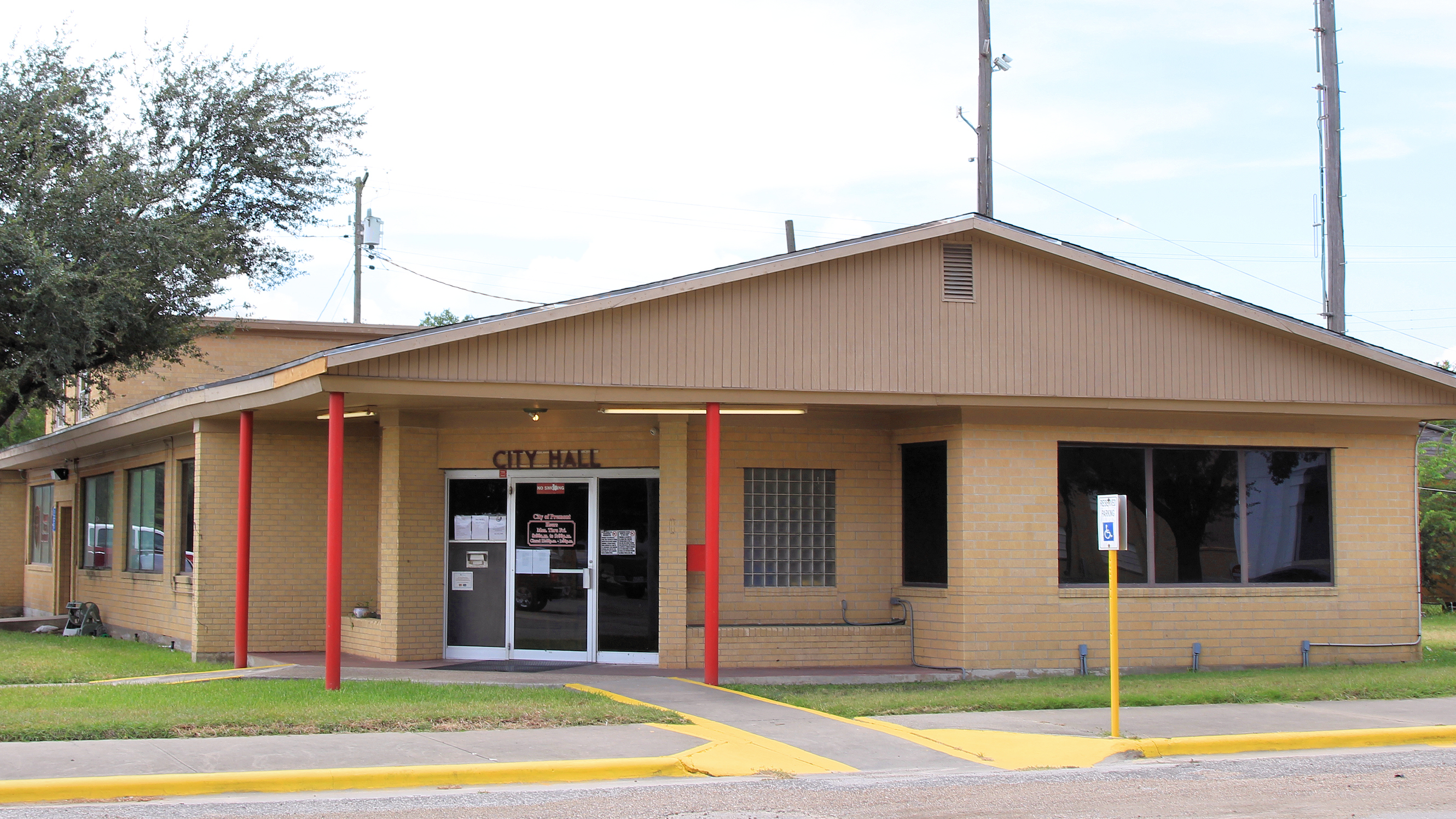
- Premont City Hall

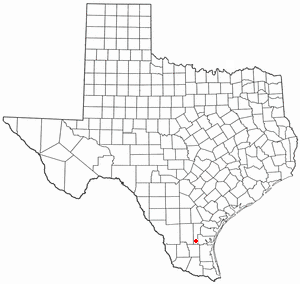
- Location of Premont, Texas

- Coordinates: 27°21′29″N 98°7′33″W
- Country: United States
- State: Texas
- County: Jim Wells
- Named for: Charles Premont

Area
  - Total: 1.71 sq mi (4.43 km^{2})
  - Land: 1.71 sq mi (4.43 km^{2})
  - Water: 0 sq mi (0.00 km^{2})
- Elevation: 161 ft (49 m)

Population (2020)
  - Total: 2,455
  - Density: 1,440/sq mi (554/km^{2})
- Time zone: UTC-6 (Central (CST))
  - Summer (DST): UTC-5 (CDT)
- ZIP code: 78375
- Area code: 361
- FIPS code: 48-59384
- GNIS feature ID: 1344536
- Website: https://cityofpremont.com/

Premont is a city in Jim Wells County, Texas, United States. The population was 2,455 at the 2020 census.

== Geography ==
Premont is located at 27°21′29″N 98°7′33″W (27.358064, –98.125766). It is situated at along U.S. Highway 281 (Future Interstate 69C) in south central Jim Wells County, 27 miles (43 km) south of Alice and 9 miles (14 km) north of Falfurrias, two towns that Morgan Smith of The Texas Tribune refers to as "relative hubs".

According to the United States Census Bureau, Premont has a total area of 1.7 square miles (4.4 km^{2}), all land.

== History ==
The site was part of the Los Olmos y Loma Blanca land grant issues to Ignacio de la Peña on December 9, 1831. Peña and his heirs occupied the land for the next thirty years. On November 1, 1907, banker and real estate developer R.P. Halderman purchased a 43,275-acre (175.13 km^{2}) plot of land from the heirs of Henry Seeligson for $540,939.50. He then subdivided the land into 5-and-10-acre (20,000 and 40,000 m^{2}) tracts to entice residents from the northern U.S. to invest in South Texas, citing the region's warm climate and ideal planting conditions.

In 1908 or 1909, a town site was surveyed by C.F.H. Von Bulcher. Halderman named the new community "Premont", after Seeligson Ranch foreman Charles Premont. A section of the community, located east of the railroad, was set aside for Mexican and Mexican-American families. A plaza called Hidalgo Park was designed and built to serve those families. R.P. Halderman sold hundreds of lots to Charles Premont, who in turn served as the real estate agent for the Mexican families, as he was fluent in Spanish. He also donated the funds to build Santa Theresa Catholic Church, an institution that now ministers to three missions. Several businesses, including a post office and a general store owned by Andrés Canales, opened in the community during its early years. Premont became part of the newly organized Jim Wells County on March 11, 1911. In an election held on May 6, 1911, Charles Premont was elected as the county's first commissioner. By 1912, Premont had ten businesses and an estimated population of 800. That figure had risen to approximately 1,000 by 1914, the same year that the San Antonio and Aransas Pass Railway built a stop at Premont. The Premont Independent School District was created in 1921. At the time of its creation, Premont ISD was the largest school district in Jim Wells County. Premont's population declined to roughly 600 by 1925.

The discovery of oil in the area during the early 1930s caused the community to grow substantially. On May 12, 1933, Premont's first producing oil well was drilled. The community incorporated in 1939 and had a population of 1,080 in 1940. With its revitalized and oil-based economy, Premont continued to grow and prosper during the early post-war years. The town was home to 2,619 residents in 1950 and had a total of 55 businesses in 1952. In 1955, American Legion Post No. 297 was dedicated in Premont. The population peaked at 3,282 in the 1970 census and has slowly declined since.

== Demographics ==
Historical population
| Census | Pop. | Note | %± |
|---|---|---|---|
| 1940 | 1,080 | | — |
| 1950 | 2,619 | | 142.5% |
| 1960 | 3,049 | | 16.4% |
| 1970 | 3,282 | | 7.6% |
| 1980 | 2,984 | | −9.1% |
| 1990 | 2,914 | | −2.3% |
| 2000 | 2,772 | | −4.9% |
| 2010 | 2,653 | | −4.3% |
| 2020 | 2,455 | | −7.5% |
U.S. Decennial Census

=== 2020 census ===
As of the 2020 census, Premont had a population of 2,455, 858 households, and 660 families residing in the city.

The median age was 34.2 years, 28.6% of residents were under the age of 18, and 16.5% of residents were 65 years of age or older.

For every 100 females there were 96.9 males, and for every 100 females age 18 and over there were 92.3 males age 18 and over.

0.0% of residents lived in urban areas, while 100.0% lived in rural areas.

Of the 858 households, 41.5% had children under the age of 18 living in them. Of all households, 43.1% were married-couple households, 18.3% were households with a male householder and no spouse or partner present, and 30.0% were households with a female householder and no spouse or partner present. About 24.9% of all households were made up of individuals and 13.3% had someone living alone who was 65 years of age or older.

There were 994 housing units, of which 13.7% were vacant. The homeowner vacancy rate was 2.9% and the rental vacancy rate was 11.1%.

Racial composition as of the 2020 census
| Race | Number | Percent |
|---|---|---|
| White | 1,173 | 47.8% |
| Black or African American | 1 | 0.0% |
| American Indian and Alaska Native | 18 | 0.7% |
| Asian | 15 | 0.6% |
| Native Hawaiian and Other Pacific Islander | 2 | 0.1% |
| Some other race | 319 | 13.0% |
| Two or more races | 927 | 37.8% |
| Hispanic or Latino (of any race) | 2,216 | 90.3% |

=== 2000 census ===
As of the census of 2000, there were 2,772 people, 926 households, and 695 families residing in the city. The population density was 1,622.6 inhabitants per square mile (626.5/km^{2}). There were 1,072 housing units at an average density of 627.5 per square mile (242.3/km^{2}). The racial makeup of the city was 76.33% White, 0.54% African American, 0.54% Native American, 0.04% Asian, 0.04% Pacific Islander, 20.89% from other races, and 1.62% from two or more races. Hispanic or Latino of any race were 84.05% of the population.

There were 926 households, out of which 37.6% had children under the age of 18 living with them, 56.8% were married couples living together, 13.9% had a female householder with no husband present, and 24.9% were non-families. 22.5% of all households were made up of individuals, and 11.9% had someone living alone who was 65 years of age or older. The average household size was 2.95 and the average family size was 3.49.

In the city, the population was spread out, with 31.6% under the age of 18, 7.8% from 18 to 24, 24.7% from 25 to 44, 20.0% from 45 to 64, and 15.9% who were 65 years of age or older. The median age was 35 years. For every 100 females, there were 97.9 males. For every 100 females age 18 and over, there were 90.5 males.

The median income for a household in the city was $22,022, and the median income for a family was $27,917. Males had a median income of $22,569 versus $19,375 for females. The per capita income for the city was $9,198. About 27.2% of families and 33.8% of the population were below the poverty line, including 42.0% of those under age 18 and 28.0% of those age 65 or over.

== Education ==
Public education in the city of Premont is provided by the Premont Independent School District. The district has two campuses—Premont Ernest H. Singleton Early College Academy (grades Pre-K–5)and Premont Collegiate High School (grades 6–12).

Coastal Bend College (formerly Bee County College) is the designated community college for Jim Wells County.

== Notable person ==
- José Manuel Lozano, member of the Texas House of Representatives, graduated from Premont High School
