= Margarita Landi =

Spanish journalist (1916–2004)

- Born: Encarnación Margarita Isabel Verdugo Díez; 18 November 1918; Madrid, Spain
- Died: 6 February 2004 (aged 85); Albandi, Spain
- Other names: Pedrito, la rubia del deportivo, la dama del crimen
- Occupations: Journalist, television presenter
- Years active: 1947–2002
- Children: Ángel Torres

Encarnación Margarita Isabel Verdugo Díez (19 November 1918 – 6 February 2004), popularly known as Margarita Landi, was a Spanish journalist.

== Professional career ==
Margarita Landi was one of the first women to specialize in the journalistic genre of crime reporting, which had traditionally been limited to men. Her diploma in criminology helped her to excel in this field.

Widowed at age 28, her career began shortly thereafter. Following the Spanish Civil War, Landi worked in the magazine of Sección Femenina, El Ventanal, between 1947 and 1948. From there she went to La Moda de España (1948–1954), as a chronicler of haute couture and society, also contributing to the newspaper Informaciones and the magazine Esfera Mundial.

In 1955 she joined the newspaper El Caso, which had been founded three years earlier by Eugenio Suárez, where she remained for 25 years. It was from that moment that she began to cultivate the image for which she was known: a sophisticated and reflective blonde woman who smoked a pipe and raced to crime scenes in a black Volkswagen convertible.

She enjoyed excellent relations with the police, which allowed her access to detailed information on cases which were the most shocking to the public. She was sometimes referred to as "sub-inspector Pedrito" to disguise her involvement in official investigations. She was also known as la rubia del deportivo (the sports blonde) and la dama del crimen (the crime lady). Her tenacity in examining crime scenes and interviewing witnesses was compared to that of American writer Truman Capote.

After the disappearance of El Caso, Landi began to write for the magazine Interviú in November 1980, and in 1988 she made the leap to television, with sporadic appearances on Televisión Española programs such as La palmera (1991), Código uno (1993–1994), and Así son las cosas (2000–2002). She also directed and presented her own program on Telemadrid, Mis crímenes favoritos (1992).

She wrote several books, including Cosas de la vida, Una mujer junto al crimen, Crímenes sin castigo, Puerta del Sol, 2.30, Crónica sangrienta, and Memorias. 35 años de crimen en España.

Margarita Landi retired from journalism in 2002.

== Personal life ==
Born Encarnación Margarita Isabel Verdugo Díez, she adopted the surname Landi in reference to her ancestor, journalist Verdugo Landi. She had three children, two of whom died at a young age. In her later years she lived with her surviving son, Ángel Torres.

Margarita Landi died in Albandi on 6 February 2004 at age 85. She had experienced complications after an operation for osteoarthritis in 2002, and never fully recovered.
