= Carrió (Carreño) =

- Parish
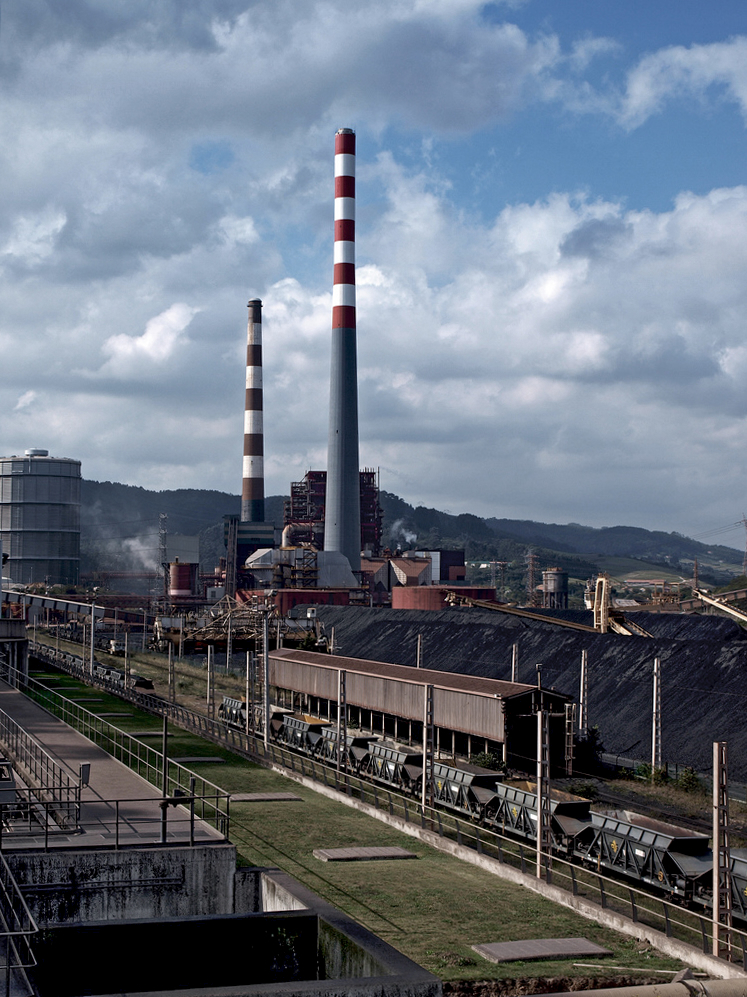
- Thermal power station in the village of Aboño

- Location within Spain
- Coordinates: 43.566667°N 5.733333°W
- Country: Spain
- Autonomous community: Asturias
- Province: Asturias
- Municipality: Carreño

Carrió is one of 12 parishes (administrative divisions) in Carreño, a municipality within the province and autonomous community of Asturias, in northern Spain.

The parroquia is 2.31 km^{2} (0.89 sq mi) in size, with a population of 157 (INE 2007). The postal code is 33492.

== Villages ==
- Aboño
- L'altu Aboño
- Bandín
- El Cantu San Xuan
- Les Cruciaes
- La Cuesta Carrió
- La Llamera
- Otero
- El Palacio
- La Peruyera
- El Regueru
- La Sabarriona
