= Premont Independent School District =

School district in Texas, United States

Address
- 439 South West 4th Premont, Texas, 78375; United States

District information
- Grades: PK–12
- Schools: 3
- NCES District ID: 4835760

Students and staff
- Students: 782 (2023–2024)
- Teachers: 51.62 (on an FTE basis)
- Student–teacher ratio: 15.15:1

Other information
- Website: www.premontisd.net

The Premont Independent School District is a public school district based in the city of Premont, Texas, United States.

The district is about 70 miles (110 km) south of Corpus Christi. In addition to Premont, the district serves rural areas in southern Jim Wells and southeastern Duval counties, including the unincorporated communities of Cruz Calle and Rios. High school aged students living in La Gloria Independent School District may attend Premont High or Falfurrias High School of Brooks County Independent School District.

Premont ISD is a Conference AA school and part of the University Interscholastic League (UIL) Region IV District 32 schools.

== History ==
The school district was established in 1921.

In 1955 there was a school bond proposal to build a home economics and food laboratory facilities, facilities for sports teams going to Premont ISD, and a junior high school gymnasium and music room.

In 2009 and 2011, the school district was rated "academically acceptable" by the Texas Education Agency. The school also did not meet adequate yearly progress goals. This also prompted cancellation of sports programs. The approximately $50,000 saved would go towards science labs in the schools. The school was also placed on "accreditation probation" status in 2011.

With 570 students in 2012, the district has lost a quarter of its students since 2006.

By the Summer of 2012 there had been no art or music teacher at Premont Elementary for several years. Prior to the summer of 2012 the district closed its middle school building and relocated middle school students to the high school and laid off 8 employees. The science laboratories were infested with mold, so they were sealed off.

In the summer of 2011 TEA commissioner Robert Scott ordered the district closed, and that it would consolidate with San Diego ISD. In February 2012 Scott reconsidered and decided to let Premont ISD stay open for one more year. The TEA allowed the district to stay open when the board of education agreed to a 14-point improvement plan.

In Spring 2012 the school district ended its high school athletic programs. As part of changes, the district began requiring students to wear school uniforms, added time to teacher planning and training, and aligned curriculum with more stringent Texas state standards.

In 2015 the TEA announced that the district will close in 2016. However the TEA reversed course after Premont ISD and it entered into a voluntary agreement regarding financial and educational performance.

== Athletics ==
Prior to the Summer of 2012 the school district's high school had baseball, basketball, cheerleading, American football, track, tennis, and volleyball teams. The teams were maintained despite a lack of finances and maintenance in other areas of the district. Prior to 2012 there had been no consideration of ending athletic programs at the school. As of Fall 2012 the American football team had not reached the playoffs within a decade and in the 2011 season it won one game.

As of 2012 the yearly cost of all athletics programs was $150,000, with about one third made up of coaching stipends paid to teachers. Included in the yearly costs were $27,000 for athletic supplies, $15,000 for insurance, $13,000 for referees, and $12,000 to pay bus drivers. The per-student cost of the American football program was about $1,300 per player while the mathematics program had a per student cost of $618. The salary of a full-time elementary school music teacher for one year was equivalent to the annual cost of one American football season at Premont ISD.

Superintendent Ernest Singleton suspended all athletics programs at Premont ISD in Spring 2012, arguing there was a need to focus on academics and reduce costs. This move received media attention from U.S. news agencies. Several Texas communities, made aware of the cancellations, raised $400,000 for the school, which was used to improve the science laboratories. By Fall 2012 the basketball team was the only remaining athletic program. Its schedule was reduced from the previous year. As a result of the loss of athletic programs two teachers who had served as coaches left the school, and over 12 students transferred to other schools. Most of the students, which included one American football player and four volleyball players, attended a school 10 miles (16 km) away from Premont ISD schools.

Enrique Ruiz, Jr., the principal of Premont High, started activities to make up for the loss of athletics. the school established drum-off and team-building exercise competitions in the school gymnasiums, and it began holding non-athletic pep rallies on Fridays. In the Fall of 2013 the school district does not offer American football. It offers baseball, basketball, cross country, volleyball, track, and tennis.

== Academics and parental participation ==
In the Fall of 2012 80% of students passed their classes and the parent-teacher night had 160 people. In the Spring of 2012 50% of students passed their classes and 6 parents attended parent teacher night.

== Schools ==
- Premont Collegiate High School (formerly Premont Secondary School) (Grades 6-12)
  - In 2010 32% of Premont High School's ninth graders passed the state standardized examinations for mathematics. A mold infestation about two years before February 2012 caused the school to close its high school science laboratories. As of February 2012 the labs are still not yet open. After the 2012 cancellation of American football Texas communities raised $400,000 for the school's labs. As of 2012 the school had 282 students. Most of them were low income Hispanic students.
- Premont Ernest H. Singleton Early College Academy (formerly Premont Elementary School) (Grades PK-5)
- Premont Montessori Academy

Former schools:

- Premont Junior High School (Grades 6-8)
  - The school previously had its own building but it now shares a building with the high school.

== See also ==
- List of school districts in Texas
