= Tamón =

Parish in Carreño, Asturias, Spain

- Parish
- Location within Spain
- Coordinates: 43.533333°N 5.833333°W
- Country: Spain
- Autonomous community: Asturias
- Province: Asturias
- Municipality: Carreño

Tamón is one of 12 parishes (administrative divisions) in Carreño, a municipality within the province and autonomous community of Asturias, in northern Spain.

The parroquia is 8.95 km^{2} (3.46 sq mi) in size, with a population of 352 (INE 2007). The postal code is 33469.

== Villages ==
The villages and hamlets include: Alredor de la Ilesia, Bardiel, Les Cabañes, La Calle la Vega, El Cascayu, Cotones, La Fontanina, La Güelga, Maripullín, El Monte Grande, El Monte'l Pando, El Redal, El Rioncéu, Samartín, Tabaza, La Tabla, Les Tranques, La Velilla, La Vera'l Ríu, La Venta, Villar de Baxo, Villar de Riba and Villa Flor.
