= Brooks County, Texas =

County in Texas, United States

- County
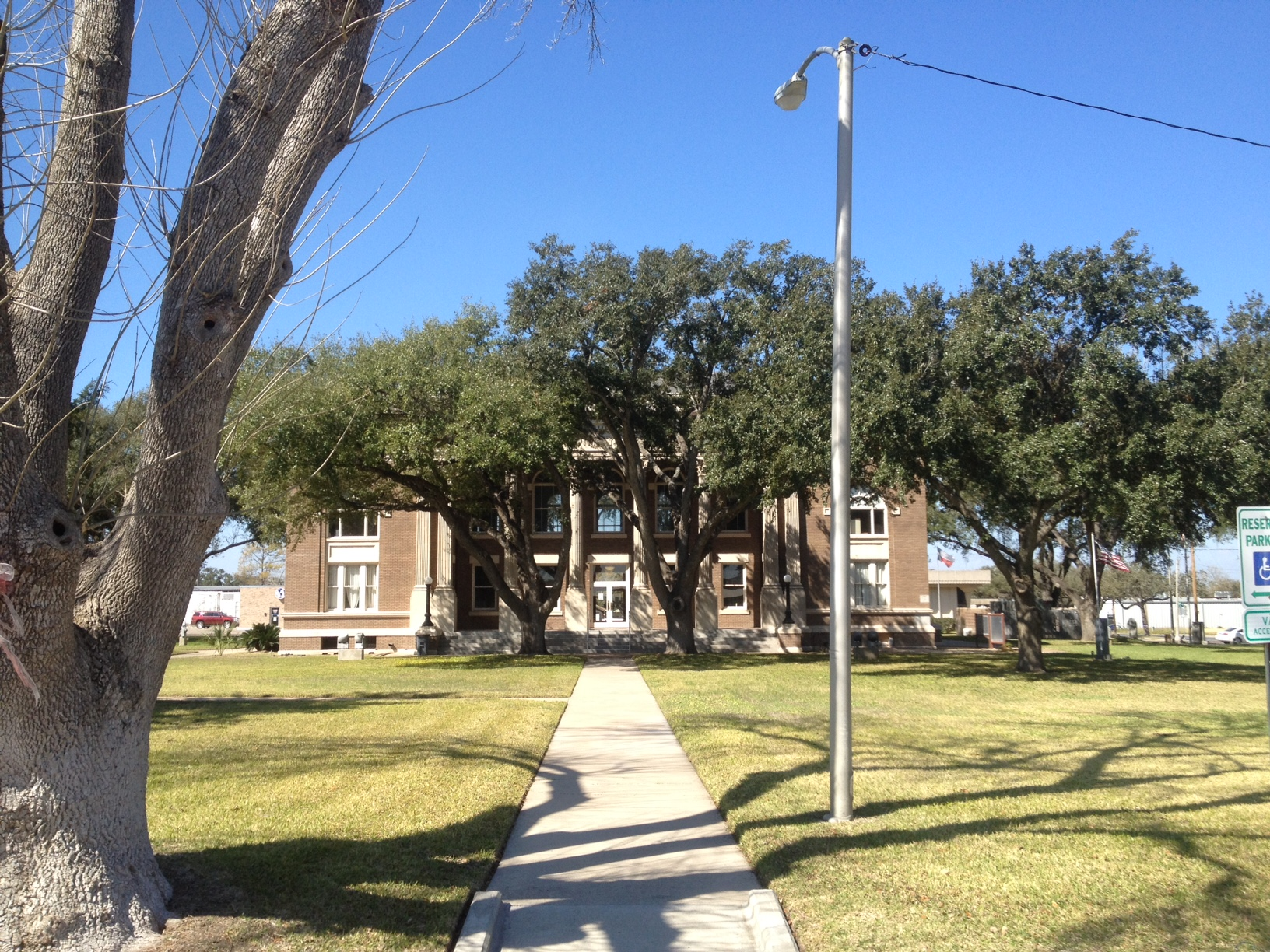
- The Brooks County Courthouse in Falfurrias

- Location within the U.S. state of Texas
- Coordinates: 27°02′N 98°13′W
- Country: United States
- State: Texas
- Founded: 1911
- Named for: James Brooks
- Seat: Falfurrias
- Largest city: Falfurrias

Area
  - Total: 944 sq mi (2,440 km^{2})
  - Land: 943 sq mi (2,440 km^{2})
  - Water: 0.3 sq mi (0.78 km^{2}) 0.03%

Population (2020)
  - Total: 7,076
  - Estimate (2025): 6,579 ▼
  - Density: 7.5/sq mi (2.9/km^{2})
- Time zone: UTC−6 (Central)
  - Summer (DST): UTC−5 (CDT)
- Congressional district: 15th
- Website: www.co.brooks.tx.us

Brooks County is a county in Texas, United States, and Falfurrias is its county seat. Its population was 7,076, approximately 88% Latino per the 2020 census. It is one of Texas's poorest counties.

The county is named for James Abijah Brooks, one of the “Four Captains” who modernized the Texas Rangers. He retired to Falfurrias, served two terms as state representative, lobbied successfully for the county's creation, and served thirty years as county judge.

Brooks County has several large ranches, including Mariposa Ranch and the King Ranch, both in the east. The county's largest employer is the Falfurrias Border Patrol interior checkpoint on US 281, built in 1994 outside the city limits and significantly enlarged in 2019.

== "Death Valley" for Migrants ==
Brooks County is "the nation's busiest corridor for illegal immigration;" and a tracking camera records up to 150 people going through one piece of property nightly. More illegal migrants die in Brooks County than in any other county in America. Although it is about 80 miles (130 km) north of the border, it is on a main route headed toward San Antonio and Dallas from Mexico. The documentary Missing in Brooks County called the county the "epicenter" of America's immigration problem. It was called a "Death Valley" for migrants in 2014.

Many migrants attempt to bypass the Falfurrias United States Border Patrol interior checkpoint by hiking some 35 miles (56 km) around it through the open, dry terrain local ranchers call "the killing fields". The terrain is flat, sandy, and hard to walk on. The lack of landmarks can be disorienting, causing some migrants to walk in circles. Summer, with bright sun and high temperatures regularly exceeding 100 °F (38 °C), can lead to dehydration, sunstroke, and death. Those attempting the trip with smugglers can be subject to mistreatment, including ransom and rape.

Migrants in distress call 911, and there typically are "a few dozen cellphone calls a day". Between 2016 and 2018, there were 722 calls leading to Border Patrol rescues, usually resulting in arrest or deportation. The Border Patrol apprehends between 60 and 70 undocumented immigrants daily. Tom Slowinski, in charge of the Falfurrias Border Patrol facility in 2019, said, "No other checkpoint anywhere on the Southwest border catches more alien smuggling cases than this checkpoint right here."

Illegal immigrant death is also a significant issue. Between 2009 and 2018, over 600 bodies were recovered. Most are not identified. Consequently, Brooks County has been described as "the biggest cemetery in America.” According to Brooks County Deputy Sheriff Benny Martinez, the multiple of found to unfound bodies is probably 5 to 10 times. One estimate is that there are over 2000 unfound bodies. Consistent with these estimates, the number of reported missing persons exceeds the number of bodies recovered.

The illegal immigration issue is a significant challenge for Brooks County. Migrants bypassing the Border Patrol checkpoint sometimes damage property, tear down fences, steal, or threaten residents of the ranches through which they trespass. Residents resent the reputation the Border Patrol checkpoint and migrant deaths have given their county. Most importantly, the cost of addressing these issues has overwhelmed county resources, and the county has been unsuccessful in getting additional federal help for the local impact of a significant national issue.

The drain on local services is significant. The Border Patrol does not answer 911 calls or recover or bury dead bodies, so that falls on the county. The Brooks County Sheriff's Department, which once had 12 deputies, now has two, who work 48 hour weeks in aging vehicles with no health insurance. The Ed Rachal Memorial Library, Brooks County's only public library, is only open one day a week as of 2021.

In contrast, the Border Patrol has in its Brooks County facility, the largest border checkpoint in the country, modern equipment, dozens of 4-wheel drive trucks with infrared night-vision capabilities, a car wash, a helicopter, a blimp, a canine team, and 300 agents.

=== Measures to help the illegal migrants ===
- South Texas Human Rights, based in Brooks County, operates a hotline to answer calls about missing persons.
- Humanitarian groups have set up water stations and emergency beacons on some Brooks County ranches. Doing so is illegal, and the Border Patrol sometimes arrests offenders, but jurors in Arizona refused to convict a defendant tried for the same crime. Consequently, not all ranchers allow the water stations on their property. Those that do, reduce the likelihood that their property will have dead bodies.
- The water stations and signs in the fields have their geographical coordinates, so migrants calling for help can tell rescuers where they are.
- Due to property damage, some ranchers have stopped using fencing or placed ladders so the migrants can climb over the fences without damaging them. One rancher, however, electrified his fencing with a 220-volt electric line.
- Forrest Wilder, editor of the Texas Observer, has called for the Farfurrias Border Patrol Station to be moved to a less dangerous location.

=== Measures against the migrants ===
- Fourteen water stations were stolen in 2016.
- The South Texans' Property Rights Association, with over 600 members, tracks which landowners permit water stations and which do not.
- Texas Border Volunteers, a paramilitary group, apprehends and turns illegal migrants over to the Border Patrol. A co-founder is veterinarian Michael Vickers, who was in Missing in Brooks County.

== Geography ==
Brooks County's total area is 943.3 sq mi (2,443 km^{2}), with only 0.3 sq mi (0.78 km^{2}) (0.03%) covered by water per the U.S. Census Bureau.

=== Major highways ===
- U.S. Highway 281
  - Interstate 69C is currently under construction and will follow the current route of U.S. 281 in most places.
- State Highway 285
- Farm to Market Road 755

=== Adjacent counties ===
- Jim Wells County (north)
- Kleberg County (northeast)
- Kenedy County (east)
- Hidalgo County (south)
- Starr County (southwest)
- Jim Hogg County (west)
- Duval County (northwest)

== Demographics ==
Historical population
Census	Pop.	Note	%±
1920	4,560		—
1930	5,901		29.4%
1940	6,362		7.8%
1950	9,195		44.5%
1960	8,609		−6.4%
1970	8,005		−7.0%
1980	8,428		5.3%
1990	8,204		−2.7%
2000	7,976		−2.8%
2010	7,223		−9.4%
2020	7,076		−2.0%
2025 (est.)	6,579	▼	−7.0%
U.S. Decennial Census; 1850–2010 2010–2020

=== Racial and ethnic composition ===
Brooks County, Texas – Racial and ethnic composition Note: the US Census treats Hispanic/Latino as an ethnic category. This table excludes Latinos from the racial categories and assigns them to a separate category. Hispanics/Latinos may be of any race.
Race / Ethnicity (NH = Non-Hispanic)	Pop 1980	Pop 1990	Pop 2000	Pop 2010	Pop 2020	% 1980	% 1990	% 2000	% 2010	% 2020
White alone (NH)	1,123	824	633	573	724	13.32%	10.04%	7.94%	7.93%	10.23%
Black or African American alone (NH)	6	2	5	19	8	0.07%	0.02%	0.06%	0.26%	0.11%
Native American or Alaska Native alone (NH)	5	5	7	10	9	0.06%	0.06%	0.09%	0.14%	0.13%
Asian alone (NH)	3	8	7	18	29	0.04%	0.10%	0.09%	0.25%	0.41%
Native Hawaiian or Pacific Islander alone (NH)	x	x	6	0	0	x	x	0.08%	0.00%	0.00%
Other race alone (NH)	44	27	3	4	12	0.52%	0.33%	0.04%	0.06%	0.17%
Mixed race or Multiracial (NH)	x	x	11	9	52	x	x	0.14%	0.12%	0.73%
Hispanic or Latino (any race)	7,247	7,338	7,304	6,590	6,242	85.99%	89.44%	91.57%	91.24%	88.21%
Total	8,428	8,204	7,976	7,223	7,076	100.00%	100.00%	100.00%	100.00%	100.00%

=== 2020 census ===
As of the 2020 census, the county had a population of 7,076 people, 2,507 households, and 1,419 families residing in the county. The median age was 37.6 years, 24.7% of residents were under the age of 18, and 18.4% were 65 years of age or older; for every 100 females there were 105.0 males, and for every 100 females age 18 and over there were 104.8 males age 18 and over.

The racial makeup of the county was 41.2% White, 0.4% Black or African American, 0.3% American Indian and Alaska Native, 0.4% Asian, <0.1% Native Hawaiian and Pacific Islander, 10.9% from some other race, and 46.8% from two or more races. Hispanic or Latino residents of any race comprised 88.2% of the population.

63.6% of residents lived in urban areas, while 36.4% lived in rural areas.

There were 2,507 households in the county, of which 33.1% had children under the age of 18 living in them. Of all households, 37.5% were married-couple households, 21.3% were households with a male householder and no spouse or partner present, and 33.5% were households with a female householder and no spouse or partner present. About 28.8% of all households were made up of individuals and 13.0% had someone living alone who was 65 years of age or older. There were 3,095 housing units, of which 19.0% were vacant. Among occupied housing units, 66.9% were owner-occupied and 33.1% were renter-occupied. The homeowner vacancy rate was 1.4% and the rental vacancy rate was 12.4%.

=== 2010 census ===
As of the 2010 census, 7,223 people were living in the county; 89.6% were White, 0.5% African American, 0.3% Native American, 0.3% Asian, 7.9% of some other race, and 1.4% of two or more races. About 91.2% were Hispanic or Latino (of any race).

=== 2000 census ===
As of the 2000 census, 7,976 people, 2,711 households, and 2,079 families were residing in the county. The population density was 8 inhabitants per square mile (3.1/km^{2}). The 3,203 housing units averaged 3/sq mi (1.2/km^{2}).

The racial makeup of the county was 75.84% White, 0.19% African American, 0.46% Native American, 0.09% Asian, 0.08% Pacific Islander, 21.58% from other races, and 1.77% from two or more races. About 91.57% of the population was Hispanic or Latino of any race.

Of the 2,711 households, 38.90% had children under the age of 18 living with them, 52.20% were married couples living together, 19.10% had a female householder with no husband present, and 23.30% were not families. About 21.40% of all households were made up of individuals, and 11.30% had someone living alone who was 65 years of age or older. The average household size was 2.92, and the average family size was 3.38.

In the county, the age distribution was 31.60% under the age of 18, 8.90% from 18 to 24, 23.40% from 25 to 44, 21.70% from 45 to 64, and 14.40% who were 65 years of age or older. The median age was 34 years. For every 100 females there were 94.20 males. For every 100 females age 18 and over, there were 89.90 males.

The median income for a household in the county was $18,622, and for a family was $22,473. Males had a median income of $23,051 versus $16,103 for females. The per capita income for the county was $10,234. About 36.90% of families and 40.20% of the population were below the poverty line, including 51.70% of those under age 18 and 30.40% of those age 65 or over.

== Politics ==
While Texas has become a Republican Party stronghold in the 21st century, Brooks County remains solidly Democratic. No Republican presidential candidate has received more of the vote than the Democrat since the county's establishment in 1911. In the entire nation, only Jim Hogg County, Texas, Kalawao County, Hawaii, and Menominee County, Wisconsin can make a similar claim since their foundations.

The highest Republican vote getters have been Richard Nixon, with 40% in his 1972 landslide and Donald Trump, with over 44% in 2024. Only four Democratic candidates have received less than 60% of the vote: Adlai Stevenson with almost 58% in 1956; George McGovern with 59.5% in 1972; Joe Biden with 59% in 2020; and Kamala Harris with 54% in 2024, the worst performance by a Democratic candidate in Brooks County.

United States presidential election results for Brooks County, Texas
Year	Republican		Democratic		Third party(ies)	
Year	No.	%	No.	%	No.	%
1912	13	2.23%	402	69.07%	167	28.69%
1916	63	37.72%	101	60.48%	3	1.80%
1920	37	22.56%	127	77.44%	0	0.00%
1924	59	22.01%	205	76.49%	4	1.49%
1928	160	32.52%	332	67.48%	0	0.00%
1932	86	12.34%	608	87.23%	3	0.43%
1936	117	24.22%	365	75.57%	1	0.21%
1940	201	22.97%	670	76.57%	4	0.46%
1944	142	22.36%	403	63.46%	90	14.17%
1948	217	16.93%	1,029	80.27%	36	2.81%
1952	809	33.89%	1,577	66.07%	1	0.04%
1956	802	41.77%	1,108	57.71%	10	0.52%
1960	567	22.58%	1,934	77.02%	10	0.40%
1964	402	14.87%	2,299	85.05%	2	0.07%
1968	534	20.51%	1,904	73.12%	166	6.37%
1972	1,117	40.17%	1,657	59.58%	7	0.25%
1976	641	18.69%	2,782	81.13%	6	0.17%
1980	780	23.40%	2,488	74.65%	65	1.95%
1984	896	24.79%	2,702	74.76%	16	0.44%
1988	608	17.43%	2,859	81.94%	22	0.63%
1992	585	15.54%	2,856	75.86%	324	8.61%
1996	413	11.84%	2,945	84.43%	130	3.73%
2000	556	22.87%	1,854	76.26%	21	0.86%
2004	845	31.60%	1,823	68.18%	6	0.22%
2008	556	24.08%	1,747	75.66%	6	0.26%
2012	507	21.10%	1,886	78.49%	10	0.42%
2016	613	23.61%	1,937	74.61%	46	1.77%
2020	998	40.18%	1,470	59.18%	16	0.64%
2024	1,077	44.84%	1,308	54.45%	17	0.71%

United States Senate election results for Brooks County, Texas1
Year	Republican		Democratic		Third party(ies)	
Year	No.	%	No.	%	No.	%
2024	874	37.97%	1,379	59.90%	49	2.13%

United States Senate election results for Brooks County, Texas2
Year	Republican		Democratic		Third party(ies)	
Year	No.	%	No.	%	No.	%
2020	859	36.46%	1,425	60.48%	72	3.06%

Texas Gubernatorial election results for Brooks County
Year	Republican		Democratic		Third party(ies)	
Year	No.	%	No.	%	No.	%
2022	785	39.09%	1,204	59.96%	19	0.95%

== Communities ==
=== City ===
- Falfurrias (county seat)

=== Census-designated places ===
- Airport Road Addition
- Cantu Addition
- Encino
- Flowella

=== Unincorporated community ===
- Rachal

== Education ==
Brooks County Independent School District is the local K-12 school district.

Coastal Bend College (formerly Bee County College) is the county's designated community college.

== Movie ==
- Missing in Brooks County is a feature-length documentary that examines the deaths in Brooks County of migrants avoiding the U.S. Border Patrol checkpoint near Falfurrias. The film has won numerous movie festival awards. As of November 2021, RottenTomatoes has given it a 100% rating. The movie tells the story of the county's plight with migrants, including the severe budget implications of the large, unreimbursed expense for recovering and burying migrants who died from dehydration or exposure. It was released for streaming November 2, 2021, and has been shown in selected theaters. It was shown on PBS's Independent Lens series in January 2022.

== See also ==
- Brooks County Courthouse
- Kinney County, Texas, also overwhelmed by migrants
- Maverick County, Texas#Further reading

== Further reading (most recent first) ==
- Aguilera, Jasmine (August 20, 2021). "More Migrants Die Crossing the Border in South Texas Than Anywhere Else in the U.S. This Documentary Depicts the Human Toll". Time. Archived from the original on November 14, 2021.
- Savata, Elias (October 20, 2020). "Frustration in Falfurrias: Lisa Molomot and Jeffrey Bemiss's Missing in Brooks County". Filmint. Archived from the original on November 14, 2021.
- Fernandez, Manny (April 18, 2019). "One of the Deadliest Places on the Southwest Border. The bodies in the brush". The New York Times. Archived from the original on November 16, 2021.
- Kulish, Nicholas (July 9, 2018). "Border Patrol's Last Line of Defense? It Isn't at the Border. Security measures in Texas start at the Rio Grande but extend deep into the United States, as agents and smugglers go to ever greater lengths to outfox one another". The New York Times. Archived from the original on November 16, 2021.
- Fernandez, Manny (May 4, 2017). "A Path to America, Marked by More and More Bodies". The New York Times. Archived from the original on November 16, 2021.
