= Brooks County Independent School District =

School district in Texas, United States

Address
- 200 West Adams Street ESC Region 1 Falfurrias, Texas; United States

District information
- Type: Public
- Grades: Pre-K–12
- Superintendent: Mr. Scott C. Rogers
- NCES District ID: 4811580

Students and staff
- Students: 1,244 (2023–2024)
- Teachers: 79.63 (on an FTE basis)
- Student–teacher ratio: 15.62:1
- Athletic conference: UIL Class AA
- Colors: green, and white

Other information
- Mascot: "fightin' jersey"
- Website: www.bcisd.us

Brooks County Independent School District is a public school district based in Falfurrias, Texas, USA. The district's boundaries duplicate those of Brooks County.

In school year 2021-2022, the school district was rated "B" by the Texas Education Agency.

High school aged students living in La Gloria Independent School District may attend Falfurrias High School of Brooks County ISD or Premont High of Premont Independent School District.

== Schools ==
- Falfurrias High School (grades 9-12)
- Falfurrias Junior High School (grades 6-8)
- Falfurrias Elementary School (grades 2-5)
- Lasater Elementary School (prekindergarten-grade 1)
