= Falfurrias, Texas =

City in and county seat of Brooks County, Texas, United States

- City
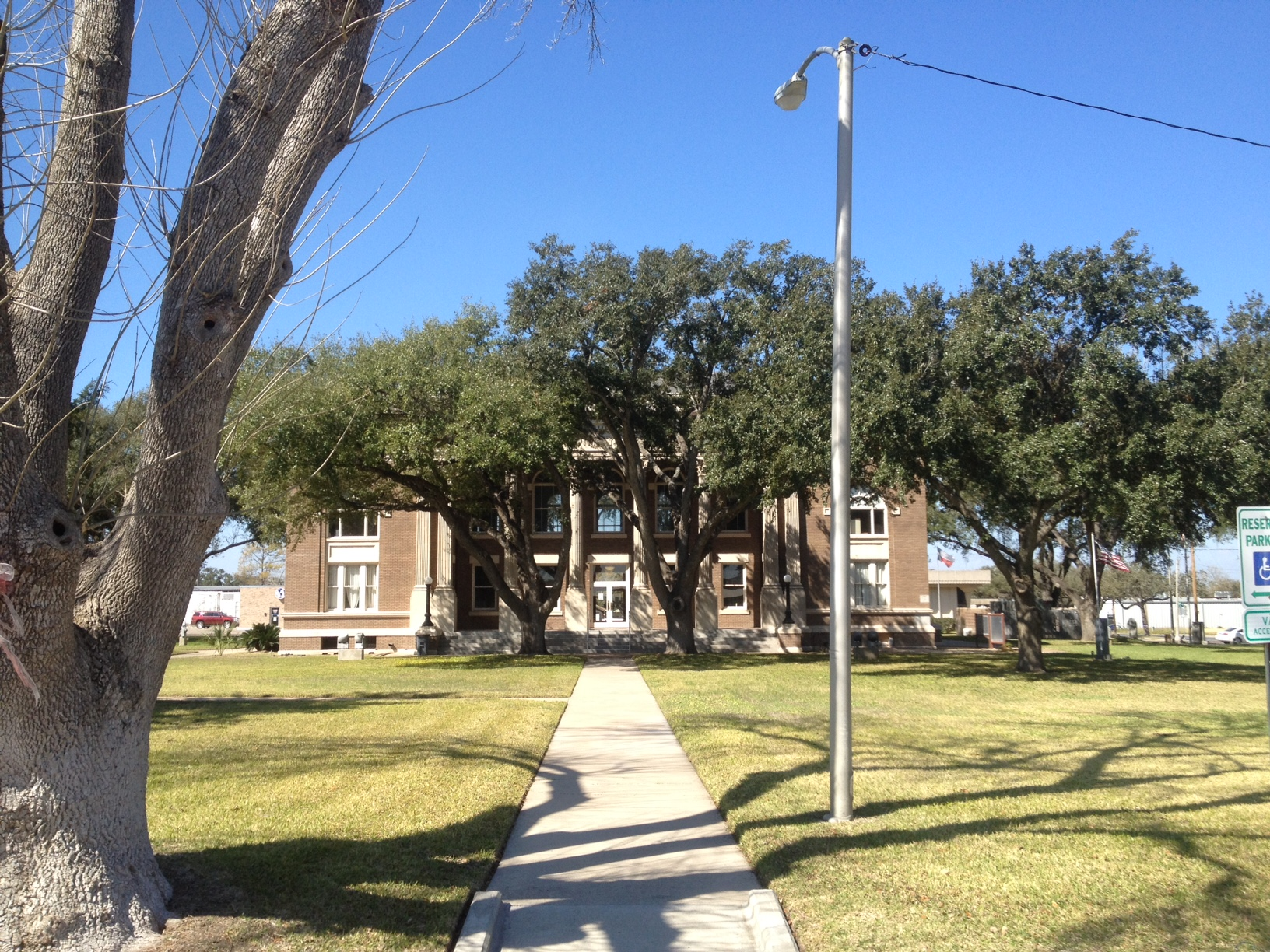
- The Brooks County Courthouse in Falfurrias, February
- Motto: "The Land of Heart's Delight"
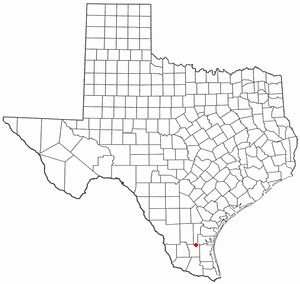
- Location of Falfurrias, Texas

- Coordinates: 27°13′36″N 98°8′39″W
- Country: United States
- State: Texas
- County: Brooks
- Established: 1948

Government
  - Type: Council-Manager
  - City Council: Mayor David longloria Homer Salinas Justo Ramirez Martin Cabrera Aaron Treviño Manual Perez
  - City Administrator: David Flores

Area
  - Total: 2.86 sq mi (7.41 km^{2})
  - Land: 2.86 sq mi (7.41 km^{2})
  - Water: 0 sq mi (0.00 km^{2})
- Elevation: 115 ft (35 m)

Population (2020)
  - Total: 4,609
  - Density: 1,610/sq mi (622/km^{2})
- Time zone: UTC−6 (Central (CST))
  - Summer (DST): UTC−5 (CDT)
- ZIP code: 78355
- Area code: 361
- FIPS code: 48-25368
- GNIS feature ID: 1335669
- Website: www.falfurrias.us

Falfurrias (/fælˈfjʊəriəs/ fal-FURE-ee-əss) is a city in and the county seat of Brooks County, Texas, United States. Its population was 4,609 at the 2020 census, in a county that in the same census was just over 7,000. The town is named for founder Edward Cunningham Lasater's ranch, La Mota de Falfurrias. In 1893, the Falfurrias ranch was one of the largest in Texas at some 350,000 acres (140,000 ha).

The biggest industry in Falfurrias is the United States Border Patrol interior checkpoint south of the city on U.S. Route 281. As an indirect consequence, many migrants seeking to bypass the checkpoint by setting off across the arid land die of exposure and dehydration.

Falfurrias and Brooks County were featured in a 2014 Latino USA radio story on illegal immigration in South Texas. The 2021 movie Missing in Brooks County deals with the same topic.

== History ==
Falfurrias' founding and development were largely due to the efforts of Edward Cunningham Lasater, a pioneer Rio Grande Valley rancher and developer. In 1895, he started a cattle ranch in what was then northern Starr County. At one point, it was one of the largest ranches in Texas. With the extension of the San Antonio and Aransas Pass Railway south from Alice to his ranch in 1904, Lasater founded the town of Falfurrias and subdivided a sizable portion of his ranch land for sale to farmers. In 1898, a post office opened in the community. A local newspaper began publication in 1906. Lasater brought in his Jersey cows and established a creamery in 1909. Sweet-cream butter and other products from Edward Lasater's creamery company made the town a familiar name across the state. That butter, though, is no longer made from milk produced in Falfurrias. Don Pedro Jaramillo, a Mexican-born curandero known as the "Healer of Los Olmos", was buried in Falfurrias in 1907 and is venerated at a shrine there.

The state granted a petition by local residents to form a new county, Brooks, with Falfurrias as its county seat in 1911. Irrigation methods introduced to the area in the 1920s brought in truck farming and the citrus fruit industry. The city became a primary trade and shipping center for the surrounding region. The area received another economic boost in the 1930s and 1940s when extensive oil and gas reserves were discovered around Falfurrias.

The city had a population of 6,712 in 1950, which declined throughout the latter half of the 20th century; 5,297 people were living in Falfurrias in 2000, 4,981 in 2010, and 4,609 in 2020.

The U.S. Customs and Border Protection opened a station in Falfurrias in 1940; the present border checkpoint south of the city opened in 1994. It was renovated and enlarged in 2019, adding new cameras and X-ray machines. According to an NPR report, the station has been increasingly busy due to a surge of migrants coming from Central America. So many migrants die trying to hike around the checkpoint that there have been calls for it to be closed or moved.

== Etymology ==
The name "Falfurrias" antedates Anglo association with the area, and its derivation is uncertain. Town founder Edward C. Lasater claimed that it was a Lipan word meaning "the land of heart's delight". Others believed that it was the Spanish name for a native desert flower known as the heart's delight. Another theory is that Falfurrias is a misspelling of one or another Spanish or French word. Still another theorizes that the name refers to a local shepherd named Don Filfarrias. The term filfarrias is Mexican slang for "dirty and untidy".

== Geography ==
Falfurrias is located in northeastern Brooks County at 27°13′36″N 98°8′39″W. The city is centered on the intersection of U.S. Highway 281 (Future Interstate 69C) and State Highway 285. Falfurrias is about 78 mi (126 km) southwest of Corpus Christi, 90 mi (140 km) east of Laredo, 67 mi (108 km) north of Edinburg, and 36 mi (58 km) south of Alice.

According to the United States Census Bureau, the city has a total area of 2.9 sq mi (7.4 km^{2}), all land.

== Climate ==
Falfurrias has a hot, semiarid climate (Köppen BSh), bordering on a humid subtropical climate (Cfa) and characterized by very hot, humid, but generally dry summers and warm, dry winters with cold mornings. During the summer, the weather is very unpleasant owing to the heat and humidity, and 12 mornings can be expected to stay at or above 77 °F or 25 °C, with 22 mornings staying this hot in June 1998 and the hottest morning on record being 86 °F (30 °C) on August 19 and 20 of 1915. The hottest temperature on record has been 116 °F (46.7 °C) on July 13, 2016, while 26 afternoons over 100 °F or 37.8 °C can be expected each year, and 146 afternoons can be expected to exceed or reach 90 °F (32.2 °C). Rain is uncommon during summer, but remnants of hurricanes sometimes produce very heavy rainfalls; on August 10 and 11, 1980, a total of 12.1 inches (307.3 mm) fell in 48 hours, including a daily total of 7.36 inches (186.9 mm) on August 10. September and October bring less extreme, though still hot weather, with the wettest conditions during the year. In the extremely wet September 1967, 32.78 inches (832.6 mm) fell, including 25.10 inches (637.5 mm) in four days from the 19th to the 22nd due to Hurricane Beulah.

The winter months are the driest and mildest, although average afternoon temperatures remain above 68 °F or 20 °C all year. Seven mornings falling to or below freezing can be expected each winter, although no freezes whatsoever occurred during the winters of 1952–53 and 1994–95, whereas as many as 15 mornings fell to or below freezing in January 1918. The coldest temperature on record has been 9 °F (−12.8 °C) on January 12, 1962; the temperature subsequently climbed to 88 °F or 31.1 °C on January 15, and the coldest maximum 26 °F (−3.3 °C) on December 23, 1989. Occasionally, a strong easterly flow from the Gulf disturbs the normally dry winter conditions; 9.81 inches (249.2 mm) fell in January 1958, yet only 0.97 inches (24.6 mm) was recorded in 5 months from November 1970 to March 1971 – including a 115-day entirely rainless spell from October 6 to January 28.

Overall, the wettest calendar year in Falfurrias has been 1967 with 55.15 inches (1,400.8 mm) and the driest 1917 with only 8.98 inches (228.1 mm). The hottest month on record has been June 1998 with a mean of 90.4 °F (32.4 °C) and a mean maximum of 103.1 °F (39.5 °C); however, August 1923's mean maximum was 103.8 °F or 39.9 °C. The coolest month has been December 1989, with a mean of 47.4 °F (8.6 °C); the coolest month by mean maximum has been December 1914 at 58.4 °F (14.7 °C).

Climate data for Falfurrias, Texas (1991–2020; extremes 1907–2022)
| Month | Jan | Feb | Mar | Apr | May | Jun | Jul | Aug | Sep | Oct | Nov | Dec | Year |
|---|---|---|---|---|---|---|---|---|---|---|---|---|---|
| Record high °F (°C) | 96 (36) | 102 (39) | 105 (41) | 110 (43) | 110 (43) | 115 (46) | 116 (47) | 112 (44) | 111 (44) | 101 (38) | 97 (36) | 97 (36) | 116 (47) |
| Mean daily maximum °F (°C) | 69.3 (20.7) | 73.1 (22.8) | 79.8 (26.6) | 86.0 (30.0) | 91.2 (32.9) | 96.2 (35.7) | 97.9 (36.6) | 97.6 (36.4) | 92.4 (33.6) | 86.6 (30.3) | 77.9 (25.5) | 71.4 (21.9) | 85.0 (29.4) |
| Daily mean °F (°C) | 56.4 (13.6) | 60.2 (15.7) | 66.4 (19.1) | 72.8 (22.7) | 79.3 (26.3) | 84.1 (28.9) | 85.4 (29.7) | 85.2 (29.6) | 80.9 (27.2) | 73.2 (22.9) | 64.5 (18.1) | 58.3 (14.6) | 72.2 (22.3) |
| Mean daily minimum °F (°C) | 43.4 (6.3) | 47.3 (8.5) | 52.9 (11.6) | 59.7 (15.4) | 67.4 (19.7) | 72.1 (22.3) | 72.9 (22.7) | 72.9 (22.7) | 69.3 (20.7) | 59.7 (15.4) | 51.0 (10.6) | 45.2 (7.3) | 59.5 (15.3) |
| Record low °F (°C) | 9 (−13) | 15 (−9) | 17 (−8) | 30 (−1) | 35 (2) | 51 (11) | 60 (16) | 60 (16) | 43 (6) | 28 (−2) | 20 (−7) | 13 (−11) | 9 (−13) |
| Average precipitation inches (mm) | 1.10 (28) | 0.92 (23) | 1.31 (33) | 1.74 (44) | 4.42 (112) | 2.81 (71) | 2.82 (72) | 2.24 (57) | 4.36 (111) | 3.00 (76) | 1.42 (36) | 1.25 (32) | 27.39 (696) |
| Average snowfall inches (cm) | 0.0 (0.0) | 0.0 (0.0) | 0.0 (0.0) | 0.0 (0.0) | 0.0 (0.0) | 0.0 (0.0) | 0.0 (0.0) | 0.0 (0.0) | 0.0 (0.0) | 0.0 (0.0) | 0.0 (0.0) | 0.0 (0.0) | 0.0 (0.0) |
| Average precipitation days (≥ 0.01 in) | 4.3 | 4.3 | 4.2 | 3.7 | 4.7 | 4.5 | 4.7 | 4.7 | 7.9 | 4.4 | 3.7 | 5.0 | 56.1 |
| Average snowy days (≥ 0.1 in) | 0.0 | 0.0 | 0.0 | 0.0 | 0.0 | 0.0 | 0.0 | 0.0 | 0.0 | 0.0 | 0.0 | 0.0 | 0.0 |
Source: NOAA

== Demographics ==
Historical population
| Census | Pop. | Note | %± |
|---|---|---|---|
| 1950 | 6,712 | | — |
| 1960 | 6,515 | | −2.9% |
| 1970 | 6,355 | | −2.5% |
| 1980 | 6,103 | | −4.0% |
| 1990 | 5,788 | | −5.2% |
| 2000 | 5,297 | | −8.5% |
| 2010 | 4,981 | | −6.0% |
| 2020 | 4,609 | | −7.5% |
U.S. Decennial Census

=== 2020 census ===
As of the 2020 census, there were 4,609 people, 1,730 households, and 997 families residing in the city.

The median age was 35.8 years. 28.0% of residents were under the age of 18 and 17.9% of residents were 65 years of age or older. For every 100 females there were 93.2 males, and for every 100 females age 18 and over there were 88.5 males age 18 and over.

97.2% of residents lived in urban areas, while 2.8% lived in rural areas.

There were 1,730 households in Falfurrias, of which 35.9% had children under the age of 18 living in them. Of all households, 32.8% were married-couple households, 21.0% were households with a male householder and no spouse or partner present, and 37.2% were households with a female householder and no spouse or partner present. About 30.4% of all households were made up of individuals and 13.1% had someone living alone who was 65 years of age or older.

There were 2,054 housing units, of which 15.8% were vacant. The homeowner vacancy rate was 1.5% and the rental vacancy rate was 11.9%.

Racial composition as of the 2020 census
| Race | Number | Percent |
|---|---|---|
| White | 1,711 | 37.1% |
| Black or African American | 22 | 0.5% |
| American Indian and Alaska Native | 16 | 0.3% |
| Asian | 25 | 0.5% |
| Native Hawaiian and Other Pacific Islander | 0 | 0.0% |
| Some other race | 529 | 11.5% |
| Two or more races | 2,306 | 50.0% |
| Hispanic or Latino (of any race) | 4,268 | 92.6% |

=== 2000 census ===
As of the census of 2000, 5,297 people, 1,801 households, and 1,354 families were residing in the city. The population density was 1,926.4 inhabitants per square mile (743.8/km^{2}). The 2,062 housing units averaged 749.9 per square mile (289.5/km^{2}). The racial makeup of the city was 75.21% White, 0.25% African American, 0.55% Native American, 0.13% Asian, 0.11% Pacific Islander, 21.56% from other races, and 2.19% from two or more races. Hispanics or Latinos of any race were 92.54% of the population.

Of the 1,801 households, 38.2% had children under the age of 18 living with them, 48.0% were married couples living together, 21.8% had a female householder with no husband present, and 24.8% were not families. About 22.8% of all households were made up of individuals, and 12.4% had someone living alone who was 65 years of age or older. The average household size was 2.90, and the average family size was 3.41.

In the city, the age distribution was 32.2% under 18, 8.9% from 18 to 24, 23.5% from 25 to 44, 20.7% from 45 to 64, and 14.7% 65 or older. The median age was 34 years. For every 100 females, there were 90.5 males. For every 100 females age 18 and over, there were 85.6 males.

The median income for a household in the city was $15,000, and for a family was $18,208. Males had a median income of $23,438 versus $17,973 for females. The per capita income for the city was $9,573. About 43.3% of families and 46.2% of the population were below the poverty line, including 58.0% of those under age 18 and 37.9% of those age 65 or over.

== Education ==
Falfurrias is served by the Brooks County Independent School District. Schools are:

- Falfurrias Lasater School (pre-K–grade 2)
- Falfurrias Elementary School (grades 3–5)
- Falfurrias Jr. High School (grades 6–7)
- Falfurrias High School (grades 9–12)

== Notable people ==
- Larry Arnhart, writer and scholar
- Mauricio González de la Garza, Mexican writer, journalist and composer

== See also ==
- List of municipalities in Texas
- Brooks County Courthouse (Texas)
- Missing in Brooks County
