= Bostich =

- Born: Ramón Amor Amezcua Sánchez; November 10, 1962 (age 63)
- Genres: Electronic
- Occupations: Musician, composer
- Website: www.bostich.org

Ramón Amor Amezcua Sánchez (born November 10, 1962), a.k.a. Bostich, is an electronic music composer.

Amezcua is an important figure in electronic music, especially in Mexico, Tijuana, and along the Mexico–United States border regions, but also in the United States and internationally. He has written songs for The Nortec Collective, as well as Nortec Collective presents: Bostich+Fussible. He has earned several Grammy Nominations, the most recent in 2011 for Bulevard 2000 by Nortec Collective Presents Bostich+Fussible under the category of Best Latin Rock/Alternative Album.

Amezcua is considered the Godfather of Nortec by producers and fans alike since Bostich's early Nortec music clearly established the characteristics of his style: an interest in the electronic exploration, fragmentation, and reconstitution of tarola (snare drum) rhythmic patterns and tuba sounds and timbres, and their combinatorial possibilities. His song “Polaris“ marks the genesis of the Nortec style of music with its sequenced burpy tubas and machinegun drum sprays.

Amezcua began his career as a recording artist and performer in the early 1990s when electronic music began to gain prominence in Mexico. He has recorded consistently since 1992 using the aliases Bostich, Point Loma, Monnithor and Las Cajas del Ritmo. As Bostich, he has collaborated with visual artists (Fritz Torres, Jorge Verdin, Checo Brown, Ernesto Aello), film directors (Les Bernstein, Hans Fjellestad, Emilio Maillé, Alex Rivera), writers (José Manuel Valenzuela, Alejandro L. Madrid, Juan Carlos Reyna), and musicians and composers (Pauline Oliveros, Kronos Quartet, Alan Parsons, The Baja California Orchestra, and Pepe Mogt).

Since 2007, Amezcua has performed with Pepe Mogt, together known as "Bostich+Fussible," and presenting themselves in concert as Nortec Collective presents: Bostich+Fussible. In 2011, the duo were honored performers at the opening ceremony of the 2011 Pan-American Games in Guadalajara, Mexico.

== Early life ==
Ramón Amezcua is the son of Agustin Amezcua and Elizabeth Sanchez and father of Ramón Andrés, Luis Fernando, Amor and Eduardo Amezcua. In his youth, he was influenced heavily by his brothers' record collection. Consequently, Amezcua developed a varied record collection that included electronic music and progressive rock including Kraftwerk, Klaus Schulze, Bartók, Schoenberg, Luciano Berio as well as classical music like Ludwig van Beethoven and Mozart.

Amezcua graduated from CECyT High School in Tijuana and went on to study Dentistry at the University of Baja California with a minor in Orthodontics at IDAP Tijuana. He then studied piano at the Casa de la Cultura Conservatory of Music in Tijuana and at 26 entered an accelerated college program at the Escuela de Musica del Noroeste in Tijuana, where he studied Composition and Cello.

== Career ==
In Tijuana, Amezcua discovered electronic music by listening to Kraftwerk and Karlheinz Stockhausen. By then he had produced two albums: Tempo D'Afrodita in 1992 and Elektronische in 1994, with excellent reception in Mexico and abroad. Amezcua became a major promoter of the electronic music scene in Mexico by organizing massive electronic music concerts or raves in cities like Mexico City, Monterrey, Guadalajara and Tijuana.

In 1999 Amezcua founded the record label Mil Records with Pepe Mogt. They began mixing electronic music with musical elements and instrumentation of Tambora and Norteño music, resulting in the Nortec style.

Mexican and international press dubbed his song Polaris as emblematic of the new Nortec sound. Polaris was later selected by the Mexico's Federal Government as the theme song for its millennium celebrations in Mexico City's Zócalo/Plaza Zócalo. Amezcua also composed the music for Mexico's pavilion at the Hanover Expo 2000, in Germany, along with fellow Nortec Collective member Pepe Mogt.

In 2005, Amezcua and The Nortec Collective released the album Nortec Collective presents: Tijuana Sessions Vol.3 to excellent reviews by Rolling Stone and Billboard magazines, as well as The New York Times and other international publications. In 2006 Nortec performed at the Palacio de Bellas Artes de México, the most prestigious concert hall in Mexico.

In 2008, Amezcua produced the album Tijuana Sound Machine with Pepe Mogt. The album received another Latin Grammy nomination. In 2008, Amezcua and Mogt, known as Bostich and Fussible respectively, made an extensive European summer tour. They performed in France, Spain, Morocco, Finland, England, Belgium, Norway, Sweden, and Turkey, among others. In 2008 Oxford University Press published the book Nortec Rifa by musicologist and professor Alejandro Madrid, P.h.D. at the University of Illinois at Chicago.

In 2009, Amezcua was again nominated for an International Grammy for the Tijuana Sound Machine LP. The Winter Music Conference also nominated the album for the 24th Annual International Dance Music Award. In 2010, Amezcua earned another International Grammy nomination for the album Bulevar 2000 produced with Pepe Mogt.

[[

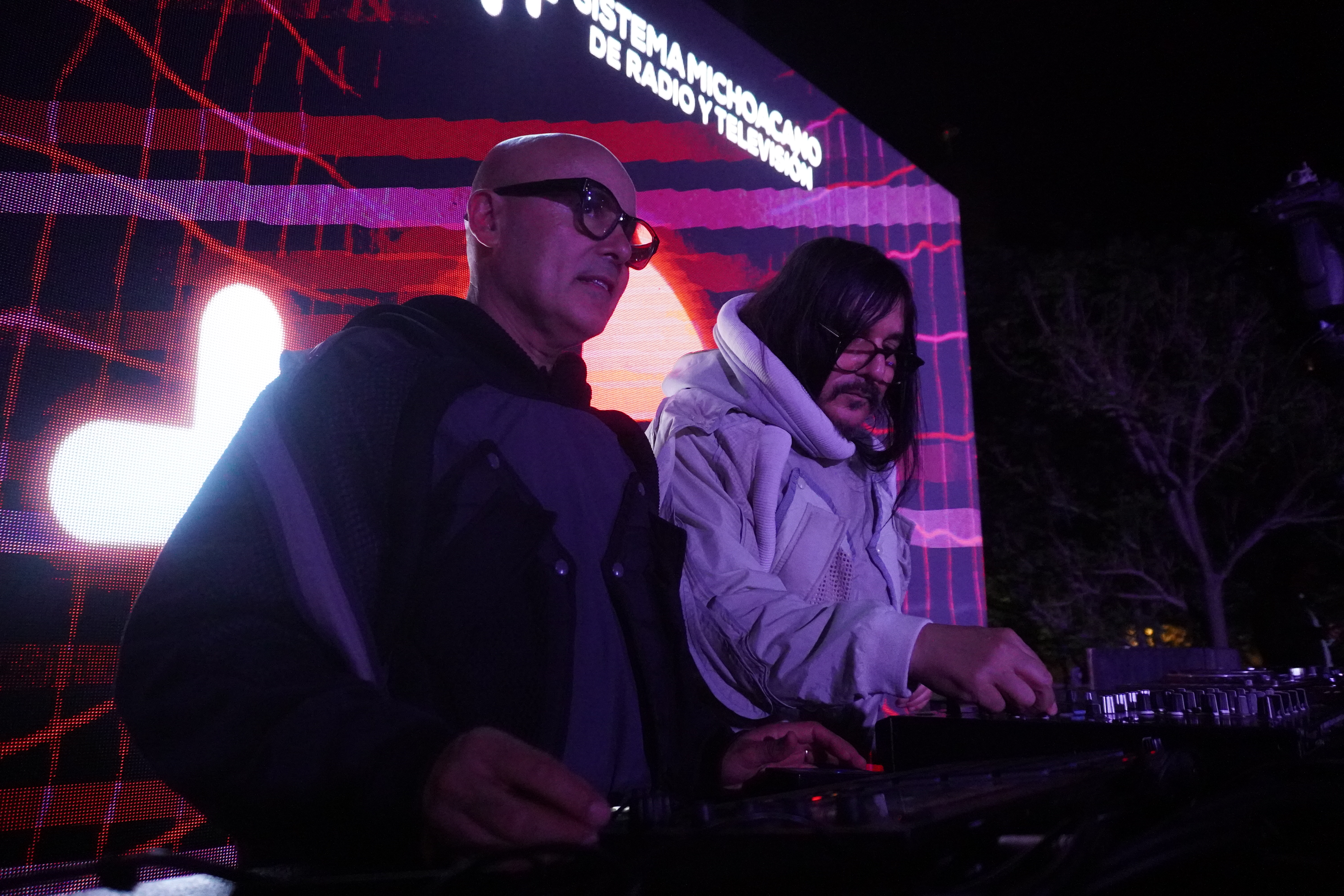
Bostich + Fusible in concert in Morelia, México in 2026. Photography by Miguel Ángel Avilés

Amezcua and Mogt performed at the 2011 Pan-American Games opening celebration as Bostich and Fussible. Amezcua's theme Polaris was selected by the organizing committee as the main theme for the evening.

== Awards and nominations ==
- 2006. Nortec Collective: The Tijuana Sessions Vol. 3 (Nacional Records): Two Latin Grammy nominations for Best Alternative Music Album and Best Recording Package.
- 2009. Nortec Collective Presents Bostich+Fussible: Tijuana Sound Machine (Nacional Records): Nominated for Best Latin Rock/Alternative Album for the 51st Grammy Awards.
- 2009. Nortec Collective Presents Bostich+Fussible: Tijuana Sound Machine (Nacional Records): Nominated for the 24th Annual International Dance Music Award (Winter Music Conference).
- 2009. Nortec Collective Presents Bostich+Fussible: Tijuana Sound Machine (Nacional Records): Nominated for Premios Lunas del Auditorio (Mexico).
- 2010. Nortec Collective Presents Bostich+Fussible: Bulevar 2000 (Nacional Records): Nominated for Premios de la Musica Independiente en España as Artista Mexicano del Año
- 2011. Nortec Collective Presents Bostich+Fussible: Bulevar 2000 (Nacional Records): Nominated for Best Latin Rock/Alternative Album for the Grammy Awards.

== Discography ==
=== Albums ===
- Bostich: Tempo D’Afrodita Cassette (Noarte, MX, 1992)
- Bostich: Elektronische (Opción Sónica, MX, 1994)
- Bostich+Fussble: Remixes (Opción Sónica/Mil Records, MX, 2000)
- Bostich: Tijuana Bass Sampler CD (Mil Records, MX, 2000)
- Bostich: Autobanda Sampler CD (Mil Records, MX, 2003)
- Nortec Collective: Compilation Sampler CD (Mil Records, MX, 1999)
- Nortec Collective: The Tijuana Sessions Vol. 1 CD / 2LP (Palm Pictures/Mil Records, US – MX, 2002)
- Nortec Collective: The Tijuana Sessions Vol. 3 (Nacional Records, US, 2005)
- Point Loma: Foráneo (RedeyeMusic, UK, 2005)
- Nortec Collective Presents Bostich+Fussible: Tijuana Sound Machine (Nacional Records, US, 2008)
- Nortec Collective Presents Bostich+Fussible: Bulevar 2000 (Nacional Records, US, 2010)
- Nortec Collective Presents Bostich+Fussible: Motel Baja (Nacional Records, US, 2014)

=== Compilations ===
- Bostich: Vectoria and Curso de la Vida published in Below San Onofre (Panhandler, MX, 1992)
- Bostich: Basia published in From Trance to Cyber (Opción Sónica, MX, 1994)
- Bostich: TransceFormation (Opción Sónica, MXC, 1996)
- Bostich: Ciclo de Krebs published in Toltecnica (Opcion Sónica, MX, 1998)
- Bostich: Ciclo de Krebs published in Motivos del Sitio 29 (Nimbostatic, MX, 1994)
- Bostich: Emphasis and Logic Devise published in Sueño de la Gallina (Cha3, MX, 1998)
- Nortec Collective: The Spaced TJ Dub EP Vinyl Compilation (Mil Records, MX, 1999)
- Bostich: Cartucho published in Nor-Tec Experimental (Mil Records, MX, 1999)
- Bostich: Polaris (Hellatina Mix) published in Dos Vinyl Compilation (Mil Records, MX, 1999)
- Bostich: Polaris published in International Dj Gigolos, Volumen Four (Gigolo Records, DE, 2000)
- Bostich: Polaris published in Tecnogeist 2000 (Arteria Records/Opción Sónica, MX, 2000)
- Bostich: El Vergel published in Toltecnica Radical (Opción Sónica, MX, 2000)
- Bostich: Polaris published in Sonic Paradise (Palm Pictures, US, 2001)
- Bostich: El Vergel published in Tecnogeist 2001 (Arteria Records, MX, 2001)
- Bostich: Polaris Remix published in Nortec Collective EP Vinyl (Palm Pictures, US, 2001)
- Bostich: Ensemble Circuits published in Frontier Life Soundtrack CD (Accretions, US, 2002)
- Nortec Collective: Tijuana Beat Shop mixed by Dj Anibal (Mil Records, MX, 2002)
- Bostich and Kronos Quartet: El Sinaloence (Surco, 2002; original from the album Nuevo)
- Point Loma: Foráneo published in Colores Vol. 1 (Mil Records, MX, 2004)
- Point Loma: Activity, Verberation and Mono published in Random V1 (Mil Records, MX, 2004)
- Bostich: Realistic Source published in Moog Soundtrack CD (ZU33/Hollywood Records, US, 2004)
- Alan Parsons and Nortec: Tijuaniac published in A Valid Path (Artemis, 2004)

=== Remixes ===
- Nona Delichas: Paraisos Bostich Remix (Nimbostatic, MX, 1997)
- Ford Proco: FM Road Bostich Nortec Remix (Nimbostatic, MX, 2000)
- Julieta Venegas: Seria Feliz Bostich Nortec Remix (BMG, MX, 2000)
- Kinky: Soun Tha Mi Primer Amor Bostich Remix (Netwerk, CA, 2000)
- Aviador Dro: Que vanguardistas somos Bostich Remix (Cosmos, SP, 2000)
- Ely Guerra: Abusar Bostich Remix published in Lotofire (EMI/Higher Octave, US, 2002)
- Fase: Tania Bostich Nortec Remix (Universal Records, US, 2002)
- Panoptica: Kinky Bisturi Bostich Nortec Remix published in The Tijuana Remixes (Certificate 18, UK, 2002)
- Kronos Quartet: El Sinaloense Bostich Remix (Nonesuch/Surco, UK – US, 2002)
- Gustavo Cerati: Sulky Bostich Nortec Remix published in Reversiones/Siempre Es Hoy (BMG, 2003)
- Julieta Venegas: Seria Feliz Bostich Nortec Remix published in Mexican Divas (Opción Sónica, MX, 2003)
- Musmilgauze: MIX 05 Bostich Remix (Azra, US, 2004)
- Beck: Que' Onda Güero Nortec Collective Remix (2005)
- Rigo Tovar: Que bonito baila Nortec Collective Remix (EMI/Capitol, US, 2006)
- Bostich:Polaris El Futuro de la Inovación, Bostich+Fussible Remix as featured in 2011 Pan-American Games

== Publications about Nortec ==
- Paso del Nortec. This is Tijuana! published by Trilce Ediciones (MX, 2004)
- Strange New World | Extraño Nuevo Mundo (Arte y diseño desde Tijuana) published by the Museum of Contemporary Art San Diego (US, 2006)
- Nor-tec Rifa!: Electronic Dance Music from Tijuana to the World by Alejandro L. Madrid and published by Oxford University (March 2008)
