= Clorofila =

- Also known as: Clorofila, Tremolo Audio
- Born: Jorge Verdín; April 5, 1965; Los Angeles, California, U.S.
- Died: April 16, 2024 (aged 59) Pasadena, California, U.S.
- Occupations: Musician, producer, composer, sound designer, graphic designer, writer
- Instruments: Synthesizer, guitar, bass, tape loops, music software
- Years active: 1999–2024
- Labels: Mil Records, Palm Pictures, Nacional Records, Clorofila Music, C90 Recordings, Facade Electronics
- Formerly of: Tremolo Audio, Observador
- Website: https://clorofila.bandcamp.com/

Jorge Verdín (April 5, 1965 – April 16, 2024), known professionally as Clorofila, was one of the pioneers of the Nortec (norteño-techno) musical style that originated in Tijuana, Mexico. Clorofila first came to prominence as a member of Tijuana-based music project Nortec Collective, a group formed by various individual producers and performers. He participated on both Nortec Collective albums (Tijuana Sessions Vol 1 and Tijuana Sessions Vol 3) under his Nortec identity Clorofila. After the break-up of the collective, Verdín recorded and released two solo albums as Clorofila (Corridos Urbanos and Ahorita Vengo) and two as Tremolo Audio (Visitas and Panorama), and co-wrote and co-produced an album of atmospheric post-rock with José Luis Martín under the name Observador. Verdín also created music for theatre and sound design under his name.

== Background ==
Jorge Verdín was born in Los Angeles, but grew up in Tijuana in the 1970s and 1980s at a time when the city was still considered mainly a tourist town. A lifelong obsession with music, which went from British rock bands Led Zeppelin and Pink Floyd to British post-punk and synth-pop bands such as New Order, Cocteau Twins and Depeche Mode, exposed him to the record-cover design from that period, which in turn, led him to study graphic design. He studied at the design program at San Diego City College and later earned a bachelor's degree in graphic design from the Art Center College of Design.

== Career ==
Verdín's musical career began under the name of Clorofila, a musical partnership he began in the late 1990s with Fritz Torres, with whom he also worked in the graphic design group Cha3, which produced El sueño de la gallina, a local fanzine published by Cha3 along with local writers and friends, which incorporated visual ephemera and the graphic vernacular of Tijuana. The 1999–2000 issue called El Nuevo Sueño de la Gallina included a CD which they curated that included work by future Nortec Collective members Bostich, Hiperboreal, Fussible and the first recording by Clorofila. Through this project, they become part of "Nortec," a loose-knit collection of musicians and artists trying to create a style based on technology and Tijuana's local culture and identity.

Nortec as a musical style is a mix of electronic dance music (synthesizers, sequencers, sampling, drum-machine beats, computer manipulation, etc.), with popular northern Mexican sounds, especially norteño (accordion, tarola, bajo sexto) and banda (tuba, trumpet, clarinet, tarola). It arose as a consequence of Collective members' experience of living on the border, at the margins of Mexican culture and in an area heavily influenced by the United States. In 2000, the collective was signed by Palm Pictures Music and officially named Nortec Collective, to facilitate marketing them as a proper group. In 2001, Tijuana Sessions Volume 1 was released under the Nortec Collective name, with design by Verdín and photography by Torres. In 2002, Torres left Clorofila, leaving Verdín as the sole member. In 2005, Tijuana Session Vol 3 was released and featured four tracks by Clorofila, as well a striking cover design by Verdín and Torres. It was nominated for a Latin Grammy as Best Alternative Record and Best Cover Design. One of Clorofila's songs on this album, "Almada", was chosen for the video game FIFA 2005, and a track made in collaboration with Panoptica, "Olvidela Compa", was featured in the movie La Mujer de Mi Hermano. Years of extensive touring led to personality clashes and tensions within the group, so the members of the Collective decided in 2007 to take a hiatus from recording and touring together, during which Bostich and Fussible unilaterally announced the break-up of the Collective. This led to various solo releases by its members.

In 2010, Verdín released his first Clorofila solo effort called Corridos Urbanos, which had a "Nortec Collective Presents" tag on the artwork but did not feature contributions from other Collective members. Corridos Urbanos went to number one on the Latin iTunes Electronic Music chart, despite little or no label promotion. During 2012, he played dates around Mexico and went on a small tour of Europe including shows in Portugal, Spain and Belgium with four horn players from Oaxaca, dubbed Los Mezcaleros de la Sierra.

Verdín released his second Clorofila solo album, Ahorita Vengo, in 2014, for which he eliminated any references to Nortec in the album art. For Ahorita Vengo, Verdín went for a slightly darker, industrial-inspired sound, relying heavily on analog sequencers and synthesizers.

During 2019, Verdín worked with José Luis Martín, a Mexico City–based visual arts instructor and former Nortec Collective VJ and musician, on an album of atmospheric post-rock-styled instrumentals, influenced by their shared musical interests as well as interest in the changing nature of technology, landscape art and photography and the phenomenon of "ruin porn." They released their collaborative self-titled album Observador in February 2020.

Verdín also produced music under the name Tremolo Audio, which released Visitas in 2008, a collection of semi-finished tracks that were remixed by underground producers whose work he admired, including musicians from the United States, Argentina, Chile, Mexico and Great Britain. In 2019, he released the follow-up album, Panorama, which included the finalized versions of the tracks remixed on Visitas. In 2022 he released "States", an ambient album created by using tape loops as the source material exclusively.

== Theatre sound design and other music projects ==
In 2009, Verdín began an ongoing collaboration with Mexico City's avant-garde theater company Teatro Línea de Sombra, for whom he created original music, songs and soundscapes for Amarillo, Pequeños Territorios en Reconstrucción, Baños Roma, Revolución and Artículo 13, a large-scale installation performance piece in collaboration with French theatre company Carabosse for which Verdín contributed sound design, original music and conceptual support.

The piece would be premiered at festivals in Europe and performed in Guanajuato, Mexico at the 2014 Festival Internacional Cervantino, for which Verdín created new music for Línea de Sombra's adaptation and production of Artículo 13, a piece described as "part art installation, part memorial, and part documentary".

In 2018 he collaborated with Teatro Línea de Sombra on Durango 66, which was presented at the Los Angeles REDCAT Theatre, as part of the Pacific Standard Time LA/LA art initiative.

He collaborated and produced remixes for Beck, Mochipet, Tremor, Matias Aguayo, Rigo Tovar and Radiokijada, both with Nortec Collective and solo.

In 2019, Verdín was invited by Mexican composer Gabriela Ortiz to collaborate on Pico-Bite-Beat, a chamber music piece for string quartet and 3 percussionists commissioned from her by LA Phil conductor Gustavo Dudamel. Verdín contributed to two of the four movements of the piece, with electronic rhythm tracks and soundscapes sourced from field recordings of traditional Oaxacan ceremonies and food trucks in East Los Angeles.

== Design work ==
Besides his design work for Nortec Collective and the Mil Records label, Verdín worked as a designer and art director for MAK Center / Black Dog Publishing, Kaiser Permanente, Rebeca Mendez Communication, Nacional Records, Palm Pictures, Virgin Records, USA Networks, Razorfish, Honda, and Los Angeles Magazine, and late in life did freelance work for various clients. His work has been published in various magazines such as Communication Arts, Time and Pulse.

Much of the graphic work and album covers that Verdín produced for Nortec Collective with Torres, including record cover proposals, visual identity tests, concert visuals and flyers, were published in a book called El Paso del Nortec by Editorial Trilce.

In 2014, Verdín designed the cover for Únicamente La Verdad, an opera by Mexican composer Gabriela Ortiz based on the urban myth of Camelia La Texana from the song "Contrabando y Traición", made famous by Los Tigres del Norte.

In 2015, Verdín contributed a short essay and a page design to the book Seismographic Sounds – Visions of a New World, a collection of essays on global music and ethnomusicology published by Bern-based publisher Norient Books. The following year, he worked on How To Read El Pato Pascual, a book and exhibit based on the reach and influence of Disney, also examined in a series of commissioned essays drawing on cultural studies, historical research and postcolonial theory for the MAK Schindler House in West Hollywood, also a part of Pacific Standard Time LA/LA. The book was published by Black Dog Publishing.

== Discography ==
Clorofila (with Nortec Collective)

- Cha3 - El Nuevo Sueño de la Gallina (1998)
- Nortec Sampler (1999)
- Nortec Experimental (2000)
- Frontier-Life (soundtrack) (2000)
- Tijuana Sessions Vol. 1 (2001)
- Tijuana Sessions Vol. 3 (2005)

Clorofila (solo)

- Corridos Urbanos (2010)
- Ahorita Vengo (2014)

As Tremolo Audio

- Colores Vol 1 (compilation) (2005)
- Random V1 (compilation) (2006)
- Visitas (2008)
- Panorama (2019)
- States (2022)

As Observador

- Observador (2020)
