= Nuevo (album) =

Studio album by Kronos Quartet
- Released: 2002
- Genre: Contemporary classical
- Label: Nonesuch (#79649-2)

Kronos Quartet chronology
| Steve Reich: Triple Quartet (2001) | Nuevo (2002) | Pēteris Vasks: String Quartet No. 4 (2003) |

Nuevo is a 2002 album by the Kronos Quartet composed entirely of music of Mexican origin.

It was inspired by a number of visits made to Mexico by the quartet's violinist and founder, David Harrington, from 1995.

The album was produced by Gustavo Santaolalla, David Harrington, and Judith Sherman, and co-produced by Aníbal Kerpel. It was released on CD by Elektra Records, and was nominated for a 2003 Latin Grammy award for "Best Classical Album" and a 2003 Grammy award for "Best Classical Crossover Album".

The quartet performed the album live during 2002.

== Carlos Garcia ==
A number of guest musicians feature, including Carlos Garcia, a one-armed street performer originally from Michoacán, who makes music by blowing on the side of an ivy leaf, whom Harrington chanced upon in 1995 while Garcia was busking at the Zócalo in Mexico City. Harrington later found a CD, Sinfonia Urbana, which included a recording of Garcia, made on a sidewalk, performing the love song "Perfidia". Kronos purchased the rights to reuse it from its Mexican record company, and overdubbed strings. They also played live accompaniment to the recording of Garcia in their 2002 concerts. In late 2002, it emerged that Garcia had not received his share of the payment made to the record company for the right to use the recording, and the quartet arranged a collection in his benefit. Garcia did not hear the finished recording until December 2002.

== Remixes ==
The album's opening track, "El Sinaloense", was remixed, separately, by Plankton Man, Murcof (a.k.a. "Terrestre") and Bostich, each members of the Nortec Collective. Plankton Man's dance mix was used to close the album. Four versions were issued as an EP:

1. El Sinaloense (Bostich/Nortec Collective) – 4:48
2. El Sinaloense (Plankton Man Dance Mix) – 4:59
3. El Sinaloense (Terrestre) – 5:14
4. El Sinaloense (Plankton Man 6/8) – 5:03

== Tracklist ==
The album has 14 tracks:

1. El Sinaloense (The Man from Sinaloa) – composed by Severiano Briseño, arranged by Osvaldo Golijov
2. Se Me Hizo Fácil (It Was Easy for Me) (featuring Luanne Warner) – composed by Agustín Lara, arranged by Osvaldo Golijov
3. Mini Skirt – composed by Juan García Esquivel, arranged by Osvaldo Golijov
4. El Llorar (Crying) (featuring Alejandro Flores and Efrén Vargas) – Traditional (Son Huasteco), arranged by Osvaldo Golijov
5. Perfidia (Perfidy) (featuring Carlos Garcia) – composed by Alberto Domínguez, arranged by Stephen Prutsman
6. Sensemayá (featuring Tambuco Percussion Ensemble) – composed by Silvestre Revueltas, arranged by Stephen Prutsman
7. K’in Sventa Ch’ul Me’tik Kwadulupe (Festival for the Holy Mother Guadalupe) (featuring Luanne Warner, Rominko Patixtan Patixtan, Pegro Lunes Tak’il Bek’et, Carmen Gomez Oso, Xun Perez Hol Cotom, and Rominko Mendez Xik) – composed by Osvaldo Golijov
8. Tabú (featuring Luis Conte) – composed by Margarita Lecuona, arranged by Osvaldo Golijov
9. Cuatro Milpas (Four Cornfields) – composed by Belisario García de Jesús and José Elizondo, arranged by Stephen Prutsman
10. Chavosuite (featuring Gustavo Santaolalla) – medley of songs composed by Ludwig van Beethoven ("Turkish March", on which the theme tune of the Mexican comedy program El Chavo del Ocho was based), El Chapulín Colorado, and Roberto Gómez Bolaños, arranged by Ricardo Gallardo
11. Plasmaht (featuring Ariel Guzik) – composed by Ariel Guzik, arranged by Kronos Quartet
12. Nacho Verduzco – composed by Chalino Sánchez, arranged by Osvaldo Golijov
13. 12/12 (featuring Café Tacuba – composed by Café Tacuba, arranged by Osvaldo Golijov
14. El Sinaloense (Dance Mix) – Remix by Plankton Man

== Musicians ==
The Kronos Quartet's line-up at the time was:

- David Harrington – violin
- John Sherba – violin
- Hank Dutt – viola
- Jennifer Culp – cello

=== Guest musicians ===
Other performers on the album include:

- Luanne Warner, marimba
- Alejandro Flores, vocals, violin
- Efrén Vargas, vocals
- Carlos Garcia, musical leaf
- Tambuco Percussion Ensemble
  - Ricardo Gallardo
  - Alfredo Bringas
  - Cláudia Oliveira
  - Raúl Tudón
- Rominko Patixtan Patixtan, arpa
- Pegro Lunes Tak’il Bek’et, vob
- Carmen Gomez Oso, vocals
- Xun Perez Hol Cotom, vocals
- Rominko Mendez Xik, vocals
- Luis Conte, percussion
- Ariel Guzik, plasmaht
- Gustavo Santaolalla, toys, percussion
- Café Tacuba
  - Ritacantalagua, electric guitar
  - Emmanuel, programming, keyboards, jarana
  - Quique, jarana, concha, programming
  - Joselo, electric guitar
  - Alejandro Flores, violin, requinto
