= Plankton (disambiguation) =

Plankton is a generic term for many organisms that live in bodies of water.

Plankton may also refer to:

- Aerial plankton, atmospheric analogue to oceanic plankton
- Phytoplankton, the autotrophic component of the plankton community
- Zooplankton, the heterotrophic component of the plankton community

== Entertainment ==
- Plankton, a character from the Nickelodeon cartoon show SpongeBob SquarePants
  - Plankton: The Movie, a 2025 film featuring the character
- Plankton, a 1994 video from Alvaro Passeri, retitled Creatures from the Abyss
- Plankton Man, the stage name of Mexican musician Ignacio Chavez
- Plankton Records, label of Drottnar and other bands
