= Corridos Urbanos =

Corridos Urbanos is the first Clorofila solo album released after the breakup of Nortec Collective in 2007. Clorofila is the alias of musician and graphic designer Jorge Verdin. Clorofila was one of the projects that formed Nortec Collective, the Tijuana-based genre-breaking ensemble that created the Nortec sound, a fusion of banda and música norteña (genres from the North of México) with electronic music and production techniques.

== Production and background ==
Stylistically, the album followed in the tradition of Nortec Collective's mix of electronic dance music and banda and norteño, but delved deeper into Verdin's interest in atmospheric electronic music, post-punk and disco. Hoping to move away from the Nortec "party band" image, Verdin decided to balance the dance-oriented material with more melancholy, emotionally resonant material of the kind first explored on the Clorofila / Panóptica collaboration Olvidela Compa, which addressed love lost and nostalgia.

== Artwork ==
After an initial creative block that came from the pressure of designing an album cover for his own release, Verdin found inspiration for the artwork for Corridos Urbanos from Western Amerykanski, an exhibit catalog of Polish Western movies. The idea came from Verdin's feeling at the time that Tijuana had finally become the lawless frontier town of legend, but also from Polish posters portrayed nihilistic subject matter in a graphically strong way.

== Reception ==
His song "Bajo Sextoy" from Corridos Urbanos was showcased in the Showtime series Weeds.
