= Owl Ranch-Amargosa, Texas =

- CDP
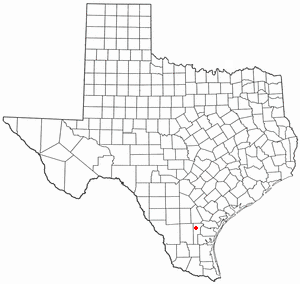
- Location of Owl Ranch-Amargosa, Texas

- Coordinates: 27°53′22″N 98°6′32″W
- Country: United States
- State: Texas
- County: Jim Wells

Area
  - Total: 2.3 sq mi (5.9 km^{2})
  - Land: 2.3 sq mi (5.9 km^{2})
  - Water: 0 sq mi (0.0 km^{2})

Population (2000)
  - Total: 527
  - Density: 233/sq mi (90.1/km^{2})
- Time zone: UTC-6 (Central (CST))
  - Summer (DST): UTC-5 (CDT)
- FIPS code: 48-54510

Owl Ranch-Amargosa is a census-designated place (CDP) in Jim Wells County, Texas, United States. The population was 527 at the 2000 census. The area is widely referred to as "Tecolote", the Spanish term for "owl".

For the 2010 census, the CDP was split into two parts, Owl Ranch and Amargosa.

== Geography ==
Owl Ranch-Amargosa is located at 27°53′22″N 98°6′32″W (27.889475, -98.109000). This community is locally known as Tecalote (Mexican word for owl).

According to the United States Census Bureau, the CDP has a total area of 2.3 square miles (6.0 km^{2}), of which, 2.3 square miles (6.0 km^{2}) of it is land and 0.44% is water.

== Demographics ==
Historical population
Census	Pop.	Note	%±
2000	527		—
U.S. Decennial Census; 1850–1900 1910; 1920 1930 1940; 1950 1960 1970; 1980 1990 2000; 2010

Owl Ranch-Amargosa first appeared as a census designated place in the 2000 U.S. census. It was split into the Owl Ranch CDP and the Amargosa CDP prior to the 2010 U.S. census.

=== 2000 census ===
Owl Ranch-Amargosa CDP, Texas – Racial and ethnic composition Note: the US Census treats Hispanic/Latino as an ethnic category. This table excludes Latinos from the racial categories and assigns them to a separate category. Hispanics/Latinos may be of any race.
Race / Ethnicity (NH = Non-Hispanic)	Pop 2000	% 2000
White alone (NH)	30	5.69%
Black or African American alone (NH)	0	0.00%
Native American or Alaska Native alone (NH)	2	0.38%
Asian alone (NH)	0	0.00%
Pacific Islander alone (NH)	0	0.00%
Other race alone (NH)	0	0.00%
Mixed race or Multiracial (NH)	0	0.00%
Hispanic or Latino (any race)	495	93.93%
Total	527	100.00%

As of the census of 2000, there were 527 people, 157 households, and 127 families residing in the CDP. The population density was 233.3 inhabitants per square mile (90.1/km^{2}). There were 206 housing units at an average density of 91.2 per square mile (35.2/km^{2}). The racial makeup of the CDP was 78.56% White, 0.57% African American, 0.38% Native American, 18.22% from other races, and 2.28% from two or more races. Hispanic or Latino of any race were 93.93% of the population.

There were 157 households, out of which 44.6% had children under the age of 18 living with them, 56.1% were married couples living together, 17.8% had a female householder with no husband present, and 18.5% were non-families. 15.9% of all households were made up of individuals, and 3.8% had someone living alone who was 65 years of age or older. The average household size was 3.36 and the average family size was 3.74.

In the CDP, the population was spread out, with 38.3% under the age of 18, 9.1% from 18 to 24, 27.9% from 25 to 44, 16.3% from 45 to 64, and 8.3% who were 65 years of age or older. The median age was 27 years. For every 100 females, there were 104.3 males. For every 100 females age 18 and over, there were 104.4 males.

The median income for a household in the CDP was $16,875, and the median income for a family was $18,750. Males had a median income of $21,797 versus $12,647 for females. The per capita income for the CDP was $5,365. About 38.4% of families and 36.9% of the population were below the poverty line, including 35.4% of those under age 18 and 27.8% of those age 65 or over.

== Education ==
Owl Ranch-Amargosa is served by the Alice Independent School District.
