= Eligio Escobar =

American musician (1926–1994)

- Born: Eligio Roque Escobar; December 1, 1926; Ben Bolt, Texas, US
- Died: October 4, 1994 (aged 67) Corpus Christi, Texas, US
- Genres: Conjunto
- Instruments: Vocals, guitar

Eligio Roque Escobar (December 1, 1926 – October 4, 1994) was an American conjunto musician.

== Biography ==
Escobar was born on December 1, 1926, in Ben Bolt, Texas, the fifth child of Eleuterio and Andrea Escobar (née Farías). On September 24, 1944, he married Jesusa Koehler, having 4 children together. Following World War II, he served in the United States Army, fighting in the Occupation of Japan. He returned to the United States and worked as a trucker, until a car accident partially paralyzed him.

Encouraged by his uncle, Escobar learned to sing and play guitar, going on to become a professional musician. In 1960, he injured his legs in a car accident, which paused his career until 1962. The year he returned to music, he recorded more than 250 songs, including some for Ideal Records, as well as performing with Ruben Naranjo. An established conjunto musician, he toured the United States and Mexico, as well as launching his daughter Linda's career. He was an activist for Mexican American rights and funded the American GI Forum through its early years; he also made the song "El Veterano", which covered his experience as a Mexican American veteran.

Escobar moved to his family in Corpus Christi after retiring professionally and used his money to fund the. He enjoyed the outdoors in his later life. He died on October 4, 1994, aged 67, of cancer, in Corpus Christi. In 1999, Linda created the El Veterano Conjunto Festival—named after "El Veterano"—in his honor.
