= Linda Escobar =

American singer-songwriter (born 1957)

Linda Escobar (born 1957) is an American singer-songwriter. Referred to as the "Queen of Conjunto music", she has been called one of the most influential women of South Texas and one of the most important figures of conjunto music. Escobar rose to fame as a child in 1965 when her song "Frijolitos Pintos" sold a million copies. She embarked on touring alongside her father, Eligio Escobar, spanning the United States, Mexico, and Central America. In 1998, she started the El Veterano Conjunto Festival in San Antonio, Texas, honoring U.S. war veterans on Veterans Day. The festival culminates with the awarding of music scholarships. In 2017, U.S. Representative Filemon Vela Jr. acknowledged Escobar for her contributions to Tejano and conjunto music during Women's History Month. In 2019, she was inducted into the South Texas Music Walk of Fame and received the Lifetime Achievement Award at the Tejano Music Awards. With a music catalog of circa 500 songs, Escobar is widely recognized for boasting one of the longest and most prolific music careers in the Tejano market.

== Career ==
Linda Escobar was born in 1957, in Alice, Texas, the daughter of musician Eligio Escobar (1926–1994) and Jesusa Koehler (died 2017). She began recording music in the 1960s for Ideal Records, when she was seven or eight years old. Her first album sold 250,000 units. She received widespread acclaim as a child in 1965 when her song "Frijolitos Pintos", received a gold certification for selling one million copies. Initially, Escobar needed a b-side track and reminded her band about "a little rhyming song" called "Frijolitos Pintos" and recorded it after the band requested to listen to her rendition. Writing for the San Antonio Current, Matt Stieb found the track to be somewhere "between [a] novelty song and purebred pop". Stieb believed that the "rubber band beat" transforms the song into a danceable track over a lively accordion and praised Escobar's voice, noting its captivating and melodious ascent.

Escobar's family relocated to Corpus Christi, Texas when she was a child. She also recorded songs for Hacienda Records, Nopal, Bernal, and Comet Records. Escobar toured alongside her father Eligio for ten years throughout the United States, Mexico, and Central America. Throughout her career, Escobar recorded around 500 songs. In retrospect, Escobar shared that her path to building a thriving music career posed significant challenges, partly because of the close-knit camaraderie among male musicians, which seldom included women. She noticed that the music industry landscape in 2021 had become somewhat more conducive to women. In his account of the 32nd Tejano Conjunto Festival in San Antonio, Texas, music historian Luis Díaz-Santana Garza observed that both Escobar and Eva Ybarra were slotted for afternoon performances, with the prime evening time slots exclusively reserved for male artists. Garza further pointed out that Escobar and Ybarra embarked on their careers during a pivotal era of conjunto music's growth, as the genre was gaining recognition beyond its traditional strongholds of Nuevo Leon, Tamaulipas, and Texas.

Escobar won a Female Vocalist of the Year at the West Texas Music Awards in 1987. the Narciso Martinez Award for Conjunto Female Vocalist of the Year in 2001 and was inducted into the Tejano Roots Hall of Fame in 2003 and became a board member for the organization in 2007. Escobar's music challenges established norms surrounding sexuality and traditional gender roles. Its lyrics question conventional gender expectations and present an alternative vision of both female and male domains. In her song, "Mi Cantina", she tells a tale where her lover frequently visits bars after work. The female protagonist proposes a solution: they should transform their living room into a small cantina where they can spend time together. Through this song, Escobar restructures the ordinary aspects of life that are usually divided by gender roles. According to music historian Jacqueline Edmondson, Escobar's music defies the boundaries of ethnicity and nationality for Mexican Americans within conjunto music and in the process, generates new narratives and myths. She became a conjunto (small band) musician and a "Tejano roots music activist". Escobar's repertoire includes songs within the Tejano, Latin pop, and traditional Mexican music genres. Her most renowned recordings are "Mi Cantina" and "Lonely Letters".

Escobar started the El Veterano (The Veteran) Conjunto Festival, in 1998. It started off as a three-day Memorial Day event, before transitioning to a single-day festival within a few years. She started the festival in honor of her father and to raise money for the Eligio Escobar Scholarship Fund. The festival pays tribute to American war veterans on Veterans Day, and showcases Tejano conjunto music, concluding with the awarding of a music scholarship. In 2000, the festival included a performance by the Japanese conjunto group known as Kenji Katsube y Los Gatos de Japon, which drew criticism from those in attendance. Most attendees were veterans who served in World War II in Japan and held certain reservations towards Japanese people. Despite objections from attendees, including some relatives, Kenji Katsube y Los Gatos de Japon were permitted to perform. She later married Kenji "El Gato" Katsube. By 2020, the festival had given out 27 scholarships.

American music scholar, Alejandro L. Madrid, examined the El Veterano Conjunto Festival through the lenses of cultural citizenship and necro-citizenship in his book Transnational Encounters (2011). Drawing from Renato Rosaldo's concept of cultural citizenship and Lazaro Lima's interpretation of necro-citizenship as articulated by Russ Castronovo, Madrid's assessment highlighted how El Veterano served as an expression of belonging to the United States within the context of Mexican American cultural forms, thus embodying the concept of cultural citizenship. In 2011, her single "Amigo Freddy Fender" ranked as the most popular requested song on KEDA AM, one of the top conjunto/Tejano radio stations.

On July 31, 2014, U.S. Representative Filemon Vela Jr. recognized Escobar for her contributions to Tejano and conjunto music in celebration of Women's History Month. She released Vi Una Nube in May 2017 in honor of her mother who died three months earlier. She was inducted into the La Música del Sur de Tejas in Corpus Christi in 2017. She received a nomination for the Tejano Music Award for Female Vocalist of the Year at the 2018 Tejano Music Awards. In 2019, she was inducted into the South Texas Music Walk of Fame, and received the Lifetime Achievement Award at the Tejano Music Awards. At the 2020 Tejano Music Awards, Escobar received a nomination for Female Vocalist of the Year and Conjunto Album of the Year for La Revancha.

During her music career, she became one of the "most important women" in her genre along with Lydia Mendoza and Eva Ybarra. Known as "the Queen of Conjunto Music", and "la hija del pueblo" ("The Daughter of the City [Alice]"), she was named one of the most influential women of South Texas. She is known for having one of the longest and most prolific music careers in the Tejano market. On April 12, 2023, Linda announced through her social media account that she was diagnosed with lymphoma cancer after previously being diagnosed with cancer in 2021.

== See also ==
- Latin American music in the United States
- Women in Latin music

== Works cited ==
- Madrid, Alejandro L. (2011). Transnational Encounters. Oxford University Press. ISBN 9780199876112.
- Díaz-Santana Garza, Luis; Clark, Walter Aaron (2021). Between norteño and tejano conjunto: music, tradition and culture at the U.S.-Mexico border. Lexington Books. ISBN 9781793638991.
- Edmondson, Jacqueline (2013). Music in American Life: An Encyclopedia of the Songs Styles Stars and Stories That Shaped Our Culture. Greenwood Publishing Group. ISBN 978-0313393471.
- Díaz-Barriga, Miguel; Dorsey, Margaret E. (2020). Fencing in democracy: necrocitizenship and the US-Mexico border wall. Duke University Press. ISBN 9781478007470.
- Hudson, Kathleen A. (2022). Corazón Abierto Mexican American Voices in Texas Music. Texas A&M University Press. ISBN 9781623499037.
- Jasinski, Laurie E. (2012). Handbook of Texas Music. Texas State Historical Association. ISBN 9780876112977.
- Bauer, Erin E. (2023). Flaco's Legacy The Globalization of Conjunto. University of Illinois Press. ISBN 9780252054297.
- Medina, John Henry (April 14, 2023). "Linda Escobar reveals cancer diagnosis". Tejano Nation.
- Ehrlich, Allison (March 1, 2020). "Influential Women of South Texas: Linda Escobar". Corpus Christi Caller-Times.
- Stieb, Matt (May 13, 2015). "La Hija Del Pueblo: Linda Escobar's 50-Year Tejano Career". San Antonio Current.
- Falcon, Meagan (June 8, 2019). "South Texas Music Walk of Fame inducts five new artists in downtown Corpus Christi". Corpus Christi Caller-Times.
- Medina, John Henry (November 20, 2018). "Conjunto legend Linda Escobar plans Tejano album in 2019". Tejano Nation.
- Medina, John Henry (May 22, 2017). "Linda Escobar releases new album dedicated to her mother [AUDIO]". Tejano Nation.
- "Congressional Record > August 1, 2014" (PDF). Congress.gov. August 1, 2014.
- Medina, John Henry (October 16, 2017). "Linda Escobar inducted into 6th annual La Música del Sur de Tejas". Tejano Nation.
- Medina, John Henry (December 4, 2020). "Shelly Lares leads nominations for 40th annual Tejano Music Awards". Tejano Nation.
- "Past Tejano Music Awards Winners 1981 to Present". Tejano Music Awards. Archived from the original on June 27, 2015.
