= Alice Acres, Texas =

- Unincorporated community Census designated place
- Coordinates: 27°43′25″N 98°6′53″W
- Country: United States
- State: Texas
- County: Jim Wells

Area
  - Total: 5.9 sq mi (15.3 km^{2})
  - Land: 5.9 sq mi (15.3 km^{2})
  - Water: 0 sq mi (0.0 km^{2})
- Elevation: 233 ft (71 m)

Population (2020)
  - Total: 465
  - Density: 78.7/sq mi (30.4/km^{2})
- Time zone: UTC-6 (Central (CST))
  - Summer (DST): UTC-5 (CDT)
- FIPS code: 48-01858
- GNIS feature ID: 1852683

Alice Acres is an unincorporated community and census-designated place (CDP) in Jim Wells County, Texas, United States. The population was 465 at the 2020 census.

== Geography ==
Alice Acres is in central Jim Wells County, 4 miles (6 km) southwest of Alice, the county seat. It is bordered to the north by Rancho Alegre and to the west by Coyote Acres. U.S. Route 281, bypassing the center of Alice, passes through the northeastern part of Alice Acres.

According to the United States Census Bureau, the CDP has a total area of 5.9 square miles (15.3 km^{2}), all land.

== Demographics ==
Historical population
Census	Pop.	Note	%±
2000	491		—
2010	490		−0.2%
2020	465		−5.1%
U.S. Decennial Census; 1850–1900 1910; 1920 1930 1940; 1950 1960 1970; 1980 1990 2000; 2010 2020

Alice Acres first appeared as a census designated place in the 2000 U.S. census.

=== 2020 census ===
Alice Acres CDP, Texas – Racial and ethnic composition Note: the US Census treats Hispanic/Latino as an ethnic category. This table excludes Latinos from the racial categories and assigns them to a separate category. Hispanics/Latinos may be of any race.
Race / Ethnicity (NH = Non-Hispanic)	Pop 2000	Pop 2010	Pop 2020	% 2000	% 2010	% 2020
White alone (NH)	25	24	35	5.09%	4.90%	7.53%
Black or African American alone (NH)	0	1	4	0.00%	0.20%	0.86%
Native American or Alaska Native alone (NH)	0	9	0	0.00%	1.84%	0.00%
Asian alone (NH)	0	0	1	0.00%	0.00%	0.22%
Native Hawaiian or Pacific Islander alone (NH)	0	0	0	0.00%	0.00%	0.00%
Other Race alone (NH)	0	1	0	0.00%	0.20%	0.00%
Mixed race or Multiracial (NH)	0	3	22	0.00%	0.61%	4.73%
Hispanic or Latino (any race)	466	452	403	94.91%	92.24%	86.67%
Total	491	490	465	100.00%	100.00%	100.00%

As of the census of 2000, there were 491 people, 133 households, and 119 families residing in the CDP. The population density was 83.2 inhabitants per square mile (32.1/km^{2}). There were 141 housing units at an average density of 23.9/sq mi (9.2/km^{2}). The racial makeup of the CDP was 76.58% White, 0.41% Native American, 21.59% from other races, and 1.43% from two or more races. Hispanic or Latino of any race were 94.91% of the population.

There were 133 households, out of which 62.4% had children under the age of 18 living with them, 71.4% were married couples living together, 11.3% had a female householder with no husband present, and 10.5% were non-families. 9.0% of all households were made up of individuals, and 1.5% had someone living alone who was 65 years of age or older. The average household size was 3.69 and the average family size was 3.93.

In the CDP, the population was spread out, with 39.5% under the age of 18, 10.6% from 18 to 24, 32.6% from 25 to 44, 13.4% from 45 to 64, and 3.9% who were 65 years of age or older. The median age was 25 years. For every 100 females, there were 111.6 males. For every 100 females age 18 and over, there were 104.8 males.

The median income for a household in the CDP was $17,336, and the median income for a family was $17,204. Males had a median income of $17,361 versus $0 for females. The per capita income for the CDP was $8,579. About 26.8% of families and 27.3% of the population were below the poverty line, including 36.1% of those under age 18 and none of those age 65 or over.

== Education ==
The community is served by the Alice Independent School District. The district operates Alice High School.
