= Coyote Acres, Texas =

- Census-designated place
- Coordinates: 27°43′21″N 98°8′3″W
- Country: United States
- State: Texas
- County: Jim Wells

Area
  - Total: 5.1 sq mi (13.3 km^{2})
  - Land: 5.1 sq mi (13.3 km^{2})
  - Water: 0 sq mi (0.0 km^{2})
- Elevation: 230 ft (70 m)

Population (2020)
  - Total: 570
  - Density: 110/sq mi (43/km^{2})
- Time zone: UTC-6 (Central (CST))
  - Summer (DST): UTC-5 (CDT)
- FIPS code: 48-17426
- GNIS feature ID: 1852695

Coyote Acres is a census-designated place (CDP) in Jim Wells County, Texas, United States. The population was 570 at the 2020 census, up from 508 at the 2010 census.

== Geography ==
Coyote Acres is located in central Jim Wells County at 27°43′21″N 98°8′3″W (27.722475, -98.134288), about 6 miles (10 km) southwest of Alice, the county seat. It is bordered to the east by Alice Acres.

According to the United States Census Bureau, the Coyote Acres CDP has a total area of 5.1 square miles (13.3 km^{2}), all land.

== Demographics ==
Historical population
Census	Pop.	Note	%±
2000	389		—
2010	508		30.6%
2020	570		12.2%
U.S. Decennial Census; 1850–1900 1910; 1920 1930 1940; 1950 1960 1970; 1980 1990 2000; 2010 2020

Coyote Acres first appeared as a census designated place in the 2000 U.S. census.

=== 2020 census ===
Coyote Acres CDP, Texas – Racial and ethnic composition Note: the US Census treats Hispanic/Latino as an ethnic category. This table excludes Latinos from the racial categories and assigns them to a separate category. Hispanics/Latinos may be of any race.
Race / Ethnicity (NH = Non-Hispanic)	Pop 2000	Pop 2010	Pop 2020	% 2000	% 2010	% 2020
White alone (NH)	52	58	56	13.37%	11.42%	9.82%
Black or African American alone (NH)	0	0	3	0.00%	0.00%	0.53%
Native American or Alaska Native alone (NH)	0	0	1	0.00%	0.00%	0.18%
Asian alone (NH)	0	1	0	0.00%	0.20%	0.00%
Native Hawaiian or Pacific Islander alone (NH)	0	0	0	0.00%	0.00%	0.00%
Other race alone (NH)	0	1	1	0.00%	0.20%	0.18%
Mixed race or Multiracial (NH)	0	0	10	0.00%	0.00%	1.75%
Hispanic or Latino (any race)	337	448	499	86.63%	88.19%	87.54%
Total	389	508	570	100.00%	100.00%	100.00%

=== 2000 census ===
As of the census of 2000, there were 389 people, 109 households, and 92 families residing in the CDP. The population density was 76.2 inhabitants per square mile (29.4/km^{2}). There were 113 housing units at an average density of 22.1/sq mi (8.5/km^{2}). The racial makeup of the CDP was 65.55% White, 0.77% African American, 32.90% from other races, and 0.77% from two or more races. Hispanic or Latino of any race were 86.63% of the population.

There were 109 households, out of which 45.9% had children under the age of 18 living with them, 60.6% were married couples living together, 20.2% had a female householder with no husband present, and 14.7% were non-families. 11.0% of all households were made up of individuals, and 1.8% had someone living alone who was 65 years of age or older. The average household size was 3.57 and the average family size was 3.83.

In the CDP, the population was spread out, with 37.5% under the age of 18, 11.1% from 18 to 24, 25.2% from 25 to 44, 20.6% from 45 to 64, and 5.7% who were 65 years of age or older. The median age was 26 years. For every 100 females, there were 105.8 males. For every 100 females age 18 and over, there were 102.5 males.

The median income for a household in the CDP was $19,250, and the median income for a family was $14,083. Males had a median income of $26,518 versus $12,083 for females. The per capita income for the CDP was $6,709. About 45.8% of families and 57.3% of the population were below the poverty line, including 69.4% of those under age 18 and none of those age 65 or over.

== Education ==
Coyote Acres is served by the Alice Independent School District. The district operates Alice High School.
