= Amargosa, Texas =

- Census-designated place
- Location within Texas Location within the United States
- Coordinates: 27°53′30″N 98°06′31″W
- Country: United States
- State: Texas
- County: Jim Wells

Area
  - Total: 1.523 sq mi (3.94 km^{2})
  - Land: 1.517 sq mi (3.93 km^{2})
  - Water: 0.006 sq mi (0.016 km^{2})
- Elevation: 299 ft (91 m)

Population (2020)
  - Total: 305
  - Density: 201/sq mi (77.6/km^{2})
- Time zone: UTC-6 (Central (CST))
  - Summer (DST): UTC-5 (CDT)
- Area code: 361
- GNIS feature ID: 2586907

Amargosa is an unincorporated community and census-designated place in Jim Wells County, Texas, United States. As of the 2020 census, Amargosa had a population of 305. Prior to 2010, the community was grouped with nearby Owl Ranch as part of the Owl Ranch-Amargosa census-designated place. The community is named for the Amargosa Creek that runs nearby. The word amargosa means "bitter" in Spanish.

== Geography ==
According to the U.S. Census Bureau, the community has an area of 1.523 square miles (3.94 km^{2}); 1.517 square miles (3.93 km^{2}) of its area is land, and 0.006 square miles (0.016 km^{2}) is water.

== Demographics ==
Historical population
Census	Pop.	Note	%±
2010	291		—
2020	305		4.8%
U.S. Decennial Census; 1850–1900 1910; 1920 1930 1940; 1950 1960 1970; 1980 1990 2000; 2010 2020

Amargosa first appeared as census designated place in the 2010 U.S. census formed from part of the deleted Owl Ranch-Amargosa CDP.

=== 2020 census ===
Amargosa CDP, Texas – Racial and ethnic composition Note: the US Census treats Hispanic/Latino as an ethnic category. This table excludes Latinos from the racial categories and assigns them to a separate category. Hispanics/Latinos may be of any race.
Race / Ethnicity (NH = Non-Hispanic)	Pop 2010	Pop 2020	% 2010	% 2020
White alone (NH)	25	10	8.59%	3.28%
Black or African American alone (NH)	0	2	0.00%	0.66%
Native American or Alaska Native alone (NH)	0	0	0.00%	0.00%
Asian alone (NH)	0	0	0.00%	0.00%
Native Hawaiian or Pacific Islander alone (NH)	0	0	0.00%	0.00%
Other race alone (NH)	0	0	0.00%	0.00%
Mixed race or Multiracial (NH)	1	0	0.34%	0.00%
Hispanic or Latino (any race)	265	293	91.07%	96.07%
Total	291	305	100.00%	100.00%

== Education ==
Amargosa is within the Alice Independent School District. The district operates Alice High School.
