= Chris Brazzell =

American football player (born 1976)

No. 82, 85, 84, 6
- Position: Wide receiver

Personal information
- Born: May 22, 1976 (age 50); Alice, Texas, U.S.
- Listed height: 6 ft 2 in (1.88 m)
- Listed weight: 193 lb (88 kg)

Career information
- High school: Alice
- College: Blinn College (1994–1995); Angelo State (1996–1997)
- NFL draft: 1998: 6th round, 174th overall pick

Career history
- New York Jets (1998)*; Dallas Cowboys (1999–2000); Edmonton Eskimos (2001–2002); BC Lions (2003–2004); Hamilton Tiger-Cats (2005); Winnipeg Blue Bombers (2005–2007)
- * Offseason or practice squad member only

Awards and highlights
- All-LSC (1997); Second-team All-LSC (1996)

Career NFL statistics
- Receptions: 7
- Receiving yards: 126
- Stats at Pro Football Reference

Chris Brazzell (born May 22, 1976) is an American former professional football player who was a wide receiver in the Canadian Football League (CFL) for the Edmonton Eskimos, BC Lions, Hamilton Tiger-Cats and Winnipeg Blue Bombers. He also was a member of the New York Jets and Dallas Cowboys in the National Football League (NFL). He played college football for the Angelo State Rams. His son, Chris Brazzell II, played college football for the Tennessee Volunteers and for Tulane University. He was selected by the Carolina Panthers in the third round of the 2026 NFL draft.

== Early life ==
Brazzell attended Alice High School, where he helped start a run by the Coyotes as a playoff powerhouse through the 1990s. As a senior in 1993, he caught 75 passes for 1,971 yards (26-yard average), which at the time, gave him a high school national record for most yards receiving in a single season. He also had a career-high 309 yards receiving game.

That season, his team reached the Class 5A Region IV finals, while he received All-state, South Texas MVP and District MVP honors.

== College career ==
Brazzell attended Blinn College. He transferred to Angelo State University after his sophomore season. As a junior, he recorded 34 receptions for 474 yards and 5 touchdowns. He tied a school record with 11 receptions against Tarleton State University.

As a senior, he posted 47 receptions for 1,091 yards (23.3-yard average) and 13 touchdowns. He became the second player in school history to register over 1,000 receiving yards in a season and led the conference by averaging 109.1 receiving yards per-game. Against Northeastern State University, he had 11 receptions for 216 yards and 3 touchdowns. He earned second-team All-American and first-team All-Lone Star Conference honors.

Despite playing only two seasons, he finished ninth on the Rams' all-time receiving list (1,565 receiving yards).

== Professional career ==
=== New York Jets ===
Brazzell was selected by the New York Jets in the sixth round (174th overall) of the 1998 NFL draft, because they coveted his track speed. He was waived on August 30 and later signed to the team's practice squad. He was released on September 5, 1999.

=== Dallas Cowboys ===
On September 6, 1999, he was claimed off waivers by the Dallas Cowboys. He made his NFL debut on special teams in the 41–35 season-opening victory against the Washington Redskins. He was deactivated for the next 3 games. He was cut on October 14 and signed to the practice squad. Because of injuries to the receiving corps, he was promoted to the active roster in week 14 and registered his first reception in a 20–10 win against the Philadelphia Eagles, a 12-yard catch from quarterback Troy Aikman. The next week, he finished with a season-high 62 yards on two receptions against his former team the Jets. He earned his first NFL start in the 27–10 playoff wildcard loss against the Minnesota Vikings.

In 2000, he played in 9 games, recording only 2 receptions for 12 yards, while playing mainly on special teams and finishing in a tie for seventh place with 10 special teams tackles. He missed the final two regular season games due to a shoulder injury. On August 28, 2001, he was released to make room for wide receiver Anthony Lucas.

=== CFL career ===
==== 2001 season ====
On October 15, Brazzell was signed to the practice roster of the Edmonton Eskimos in the Canadian Football League. On November 4, he made his debut in a 32–26 win against the Montreal Alouettes, a game in which he had three receptions for 76 yards. He also had one reception for nine yards in Edmonton's 34–16 Western Final loss to Calgary.

==== 2002 season ====
Brazzell played in 11 games in his second season, finishing fourth among Edmonton wide receivers with 30 receptions for 546 yards and three touchdowns. One of his personal highlights was a 101-yard reception for a touchdown from Jason Maas in a 27–21 season-opening win against the Calgary Stampeders. He continued to make big plays in the post-season, registering 4 receptions for 79 yards in a 33–30 Western Final against Winnipeg. In the 25–16 Grey Cup loss against Montreal, he had three receptions for 65 yards.

==== 2003 season ====
Brazzell signed with the BC Lions as a free agent on March 25. He played in all 18 games for B.C. that season. He finished second on team, and sixth in the CFL, with 1,111 yards on 68 catches including six receiving touchdowns. He registered five 100-yard receiving games. He had perhaps his best game of the season in the Lions' 26–20 victory on September 20 against the Winnipeg Blue Bombers when seven receptions for 157 yards.

He had the first multi-TD game of his CFL career when he hauled in a pair of scores in the Lions' August 22 victory against the Hamilton Tiger-Cats. Brazzell had two catches for 11 yards in the Lions' 28–7 Eastern Semifinal loss in Toronto.

==== 2004 season ====
In 2004 Brazzell finished fourth on the BC Lions in receiving with 49 receptions for 906 yards and eight touchdowns in 16 games. He had three 100-yard games during that span. Brazzell was equally effective in the post-season for the Lions. He had three catches for 40 yards and one touchdown in B.C.'s 27–25 Western Final overtime victory against the Saskatchewan Roughriders. He also had a pair of passes in the Leo's 27–19 loss to the Toronto Argonauts in that year's Grey Cup championship.

==== 2005 season ====
In 2005, Brazzell signed with the Hamilton Tiger-Cats. During his brief stay in Hamilton, Brazzell had 22 catches for 252 yards and two touchdowns in six games. Brazzell had signed with the Ti-cats on the promise that he would only play the wide receiver position, but the Ti-cats coaching staff had Brazzell play slotback for them. This outraged Brazzell, as he saw himself as a deep threat receiver, something that playing slotback did not let him do.

On August 9, 2005, Brazzell was traded to the Winnipeg Blue Bombers in exchange for Canadian receiver Kamau Peterson. The trade quickly showed to be one sided, with Brazzell hauling in 12 passes for 307 yards and two touchdowns in his first 3 games as a Bomber, surpassing his yard total and matching his touchdown total that he had posted in 6 games as a Ti-cat. He finished the season with 46 catches for 708 yards and six touchdowns.

==== 2006 season ====
In 2006, he experienced a season of ups and downs. He started the season strong with a multiple touchdown game against the Edmonton Eskimos on July 1 and a couple more touchdowns in other games. By mid season his play started to flounder, with him being totally neutral during many games.

At the end of the season he picked his play up to finish the season with 43 catches for 604 yards and 7 touchdowns. Although Brazzell was scheduled to become a free agent on February 16, 2007, he chose to re-sign with the Blue Bombers.

==== 2007 season ====
Brazzell played 7 games for the Blue Bombers until he injured his ankle in September. In those games he had 17 receptions for 182 yards and one touchdown. He was released on February 5, 2008.
