= Alice High School =

Coordinates: 27.75497°N 98.05093°W

Location
- 1 Coyote Trail; Alice, Texas 78332; United States

Information
- School type: Public high school
- Established: 1887
- School district: Alice Independent School District
- Principal: Marissa Kubala
- Teaching staff: 97.29 (FTE)
- Grades: 9-12
- Enrollment: 1,362 (2023-2024)
- Student to teacher ratio: 14.00
- Colors: Burnt orange & white
- Athletics conference: UIL Class 4A, Division 1, District 16
- Mascot: Coyote/Lady Coyote
- Newspaper: Yote Howl
- Website: Alice High School website

Alice High School is a senior high school in Alice, Texas. A part of the Alice Independent School District, it serves Alice and surrounding communities in Jim Wells County.

== Attendance area ==
Areas within Alice ISD, of which Alice High is its only comprehensive high school, include Alice, Alice Acres, Amargosa, Coyote Acres, Owl Ranch, Rancho Alegre, and portions of Loma Linda East and Ben Bolt.

== History ==
The City of Alice was named for Alice Gertrudis King Kleberg, Robert Justus Kleberg's wife and the daughter of Richard King. The first school began in 1887 in the attic of the old Sedwick House, with Miss Mary Wood as the first teacher, and the first principal was "a Professor Baxter". In 1890, the town elected a school board and built a "two-floor, four-room school", adding a fifth room to the school in 1900. In 1905, the first brick school building was built at Third and Reynolds Streets."

In 1930, the Alice School Board contracted to build a school containing thirteen classrooms and a library. Classes first commenced in January 1931 in this new Alice High School, located along 3rd Street.

In 1933 the school was renamed William Adams High School to honor Judge William Adams, a local rancher and civil servant, to honor his many contributions to the city. The School Board voted to change the name of the High School back to Alice High in 1969. Construction of Alice High was completed in time for 1970 school year, and the first graduating class was in 1971. The old highschool building became William Adams Middle School.

== Academics ==
Alice High School is part of the Alice Independent School District, which Met Standards under TEA Assessment and Accountability Division of Performance Reporting ratings as of 2014. Alice High School itself Met Standards under the TEA rating system, and earned distinctions in Reading/ELA and Math as of 2014.

"The Pride of South Texas"

For over 100 years, Alice athletics and academics have consistently represented South Texas well in local and state competitions. The school has earned its nickname as "The Pride of South Texas".

== Athletics ==
Alice High School has athletes that compete in 13 different sports, which include:

Cross Country, Volleyball, Football, Basketball, Swimming, Soccer, Golf, Tennis, Track, Softball, Baseball, Power-lifting, and Cheerleading.

The home football games, soccer games, and track meets are held at Memorial Stadium, which has a capacity of 10,500.

=== Football ===
High school football has been part of Alice, Texas since 1905. The school's first official game was a 38-0 win over H.M. King High School (Kingsville, TX) in the year 1909. Since 1909 the Alice Coyotes have won 21 district titles, made 36 playoff appearances (18th all-time and 6th most in Class 4a history), and played in 4 Texas State semi-final games (1955(William Adams), 1979, 1998, and 1999).

Alice High School's rival is Henrietta M. King High School (Kingsville, TX). The first meeting between the teams was in 1909, and matchup is known as "The Brush County Shootout". The Alice Football team and their fans rode 20 miles in horse drawn buggies to Kingsville. Alice won the game 38-0. Since then, the two teams have played each other 81 times. Alice leads the series 43-35-3 as of 2010.

== Student activities ==
=== Clubs ===
Current clubs at Alice High School include Art, Auto Mechanics, BPA, Band Council, Building Trades, Cheerleaders, Chorale, Cosmetology, DECA, Decathlon, Drama, Drill Team/Strutters, Environmental Club, FCCLA, FFA, Graphics, HOSA, Interact/Rotary, JETS, Junior Class, Law Enforcement, Newspaper, NHS, ROTC, Senior Class, Spanish, Student Council, TAFE, UIL, and Yearbook.

=== Alice High School Band ===
The Alice High School band was organized in 1933. In 1960, Bryce Taylor was hired on as Band Director in Alice. He spent the next fifty years as music supervisor and high school band director for the Alice ISD. In his tenure, the Alice High School band earned 29 consecutive UIL Sweepstakes awards and placed in the top five TMEA Honor Band auditions for Class 5A twelve times. The Alice High School band was one of the first five schools to be awarded the Sudler Flag of Honor by John Philip Sousa Foundation and is listed on their national Roll of Honor for high school bands in existence between 1960 and 1980. The band is now under the direction of Emerico Perez III who himself was a student of Bryce Taylor.

=== Theatre Department ===
Alice High School has an award-winning theatre department with a strong reputation in the educational theatre community. For the first two decades, the drama program was under the direction of Don Howell. Well respected around the state for his theatre expertise, he was able to take the UIL One Act Play team to state competition on several occasions. After retirement Mr. Howell went on to work for the U.I.L. One Act Play office located at the University of Texas and to adjudicate for UIL. Following his retirement in 1993, Darleen Totten took over and has continued to promote outstanding theatre at Alice High School. Under her direction the students received the National Forensic League Leading Chapter award and performed at Thespian State and the International Thespian Festival on numerous occasions. In the fall of 2006, the Alice High School Theatre Department received international attention when their thespian troop appeared in Dramatics Magazine and Ms. Totten was interviewed for a story in Stage Directions Magazine.

In 2007 and 2016, the thespian troupe 5191 was chosen to perform The Effect of Gamma Rays on Man-in-the-moon Marigolds at Lincoln, Nebraska, for the International Thespian Festival. The students were given a standing ovation by thousands of drama students from around the world. They were also invited to bring Crimes of the Heart for the Chapter select performance the following year. The play was directed by a student, Sylvia Gonzalez. They did not perform because one of the cast members had emergency surgery just before the trip to Nebraska. Darleen Totten also led Alice High School Drama club on an outstanding UIL OAP journey in 2011, with their production of Turandot which was also presented at the International Thespian Festival in Lincoln, Nebraska. This performance has been featured on the EdTA website. Clips of the school's production of Turandot are used in promotional videos for Thespians created by EdTA. In January 2014, they were invited to perform She Kills Monsters at the Alabama State Thespian Festival. Pictures of their trip to Alabama were shared by the Samuel French publishing company.

== Notable alumni ==
- James P. Allison - Cancer researcher at the University of Texas who won the 2018 Nobel Prize in Physiology or Medicine
- Marv Brown - He was drafted in the 25th round (301st overall) by the Detroit Lions in 1953. He was part of the Detroit team that won the championship in 1957.
- Sonny Brown - Ex NFL Player (Houston Oilers) and Member of the 1985 National Champions Oklahoma Sooners (Brown was named MVP of the championship game).
- Chris Brazzell - CFL and ex NFL player with the Dallas Cowboys.
- Lois Chiles - American actress and former fashion model known for her roles as Dr. Holly Goodhead in the 1979 James Bond film Moonraker, and as a hit and run driver in 1987's Creepshow 2.
- Bobby Cuellar - bullpen coach of the Minnesota Twins of Major League Baseball. He is a former professional baseball player who played briefly with the Texas Rangers in 1977 as a relief pitcher.
- Robert Curl – 1996 Nobel Prize Winner and a chemistry professor at Rice University
- J. Frank Dobie - Was a professor at Cambridge University and the University of Texas. He is also an award-winning author and political activist. He is credited with helping to save the Longhorn Cattle from extinction. The Dobie Center in Austin is named after him.
- Joe Pate - He was a left-handed pitcher with the Philadelphia Athletics in 1926 and 1927.
- Jim Tyrone - Professional baseball player for the Chicago Cubs and Oakland Athletics during the 70s.
- Wayne Tyrone - Professional baseball player for the Chicago Cubs in 1976.
- Walter F. Woodul - Lieutenant Governor of Texas from 1935 to 1939.

== Miscellaneous ==
=== The Year 1933 ===
- Cost of education in Alice amounted to .27 cents per student per day.
- 160 students enrolled in Senior High.
- 119 students enrolled in Junior High.

=== Memorial Stadium ===
- Construction of Memorial Stadium was completed in 1947.
- The first game played at the stadium was on October 17, 1947 (Alice beat Taft High School 6-0)
- Memorial Stadium has a capacity of 10,500.

=== The Year 1950 ===
- Alice hosts the first annual "Hub City Relays".
