= Owl Ranch, Texas =

- Census-designated place
- Location within Texas Location within the United States
- Coordinates: 27°53′31″N 98°05′45″W
- Country: United States
- State: Texas
- County: Jim Wells

Area
  - Total: 0.742 sq mi (1.92 km^{2})
  - Land: 0.742 sq mi (1.92 km^{2})
  - Water: 0 sq mi (0 km^{2})
- Elevation: 285 ft (87 m)

Population (2020)
  - Total: 189
  - Density: 255/sq mi (98.3/km^{2})
- Time zone: UTC-6 (Central (CST))
  - Summer (DST): UTC-5 (CDT)
- Area code: 361
- GNIS feature ID: 2413654

Owl Ranch is an unincorporated community and census-designated place in Jim Wells County, Texas, United States. As of the 2020 census, Owl Ranch had a population of 189. Prior to 2010, the community was grouped with nearby Amargosa as part of the Owl Ranch-Amargosa census-designated place.

== Geography ==
According to the U.S. Census Bureau, the community has an area of 0.742 square miles (1.92 km^{2}), all land.

== Demographics ==
Historical population
Census	Pop.	Note	%±
2010	225		—
2020	189		−16.0%
U.S. Decennial Census; 1850–1900 1910; 1920 1930 1940; 1950 1960 1970; 1980 1990 2000; 2010 2020

Owl Ranch first appeared as census designated place in the 2010 U.S. census formed from part of the deleted Owl Ranch-Amargosa CDP.

=== 2020 census ===
Owl Ranch CDP, Texas – Racial and ethnic composition Note: the US Census treats Hispanic/Latino as an ethnic category. This table excludes Latinos from the racial categories and assigns them to a separate category. Hispanics/Latinos may be of any race.
Race / Ethnicity (NH = Non-Hispanic)	Pop 2010	Pop 2020	% 2010	% 2020
White alone (NH)	5	12	2.22%	6.35%
Black or African American alone (NH)	0	3	0.00%	1.59%
Native American or Alaska Native alone (NH)	0	0	0.00%	0.00%
Asian alone (NH)	0	0	0.00%	0.00%
Native Hawaiian or Pacific Islander alone (NH)	0	0	0.00%	0.00%
Other Race alone (NH)	0	0	0.00%	0.00%
Mixed race or Multiracial (NH)	0	0	0.00%	0.00%
Hispanic or Latino (any race)	220	174	97.78%	92.06%
Total	225	189	100.00%	100.00%

== Education ==
Owl Creek is located within the Alice Independent School District, which operates Alice High School.
