= Kobol (band) =

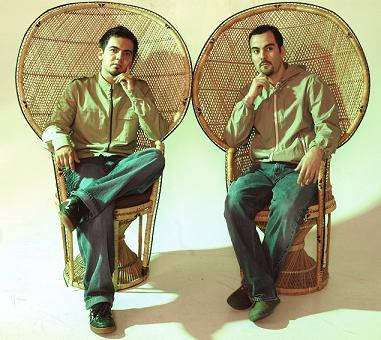

Background information
- Born: Ignacio Chavez & Arhkota
- Origin: U.S.
- Genres: Nu jazz, electronic, downtempo, dub
- Occupation: Musician
- Instruments: Guitar, sampler, Midi controller, Virus synthesizer, drums, drum pads, Roland, classical guitar, keyboards, kalimba
- Years active: 2000–present
- Label: Static Discos

Kobol is a musical duo from Ensenada, Baja California, Mexico, formed by Ignacio Chávez and Argel "Arhkota" Cota. They define their music as "a mixture of jazzy natural low tempo beats, freestyle DSP jams, sly acoustic impressions with dubby vibes".

== Discography ==
=== Albums ===
- Centipede (Jan, 2013)
- Broken Ebony (Oct, 2005)
- Extempore (Nov, 2007)

=== Remixes ===
2007	Murcof: "Urano (Kobol Mix)"	Appears on StaticDiscos Extempore
2007	State Shirt: "StrawMan (Kobol Mix)"	Appears on StaticDiscos Extempore
2007	Pepito: "The Dogs (Kobol Mix)"	Appears on StaticDiscos Extempore.
2007	Kampion.: "Dreamy Snapshoot (Kobol Mix)"	Appears on StaticDiscos Extempore.
2006	Fax: "Soulsong (Kobol Mix)"	Appears on Darla little darla has a treat for you, vol. 24.
2005	Fax: "Mips On Fire / Matriz (Kobol Mix)"	Appears on StaticDiscos Ruido De Fondo.
