= Rancho Alegre, Texas =

- Census-designated place
- Coordinates: 27°44′24″N 98°5′35″W
- Country: United States
- State: Texas
- County: Jim Wells

Area
  - Total: 1.28 sq mi (3.31 km^{2})
  - Land: 1.28 sq mi (3.31 km^{2})
  - Water: 0 sq mi (0.0 km^{2})
- Elevation: 213 ft (65 m)

Population (2020)
  - Total: 1,415
  - Density: 1,110/sq mi (427/km^{2})
- Time zone: UTC-6 (Central (CST))
  - Summer (DST): UTC-5 (CDT)
- Area code: 361
- FIPS code: 48-60518
- GNIS feature ID: 1852755

Rancho Alegre is an unincorporated area and census-designated place (CDP) in Jim Wells County, Texas, United States. The population was 1,415 at the 2020 census.

== Geography ==
Rancho Alegre is located in central Jim Wells County at 27°44′24″N 98°5′35″W (27.739945, -98.093028). It is bordered to the northeast by Alice, the county seat, and to the south by unincorporated Alice Acres.

According to the United States Census Bureau, the CDP has a total area of 1.3 square miles (3.3 km^{2}), all land.

== Demographics ==
Historical population
Census	Pop.	Note	%±
2000	1,775		—
2010	1,704		−4.0%
2020	1,415		−17.0%
U.S. Decennial Census; 1850–1900 1910; 1920 1930 1940; 1950 1960 1970; 1980 1990 2000; 2010 2020

Rancho Alegre first appeared as a census designated place in the 2000 U.S. census.

=== 2020 census ===
Rancho Alegre CDP, Texas – Racial and ethnic composition Note: the US Census treats Hispanic/Latino as an ethnic category. This table excludes Latinos from the racial categories and assigns them to a separate category. Hispanics/Latinos may be of any race.
Race / Ethnicity (NH = Non-Hispanic)	Pop 2000	Pop 2010	Pop 2020	% 2000	% 2010	% 2020
White alone (NH)	151	70	77	8.51%	4.11%	5.44%
Black or African American alone (NH)	5	2	4	0.28%	0.12%	0.28%
Native American or Alaska Native alone (NH)	2	1	0	0.11%	0.06%	0.00%
Asian alone (NH)	1	0	0	0.06%	0.00%	0.00%
Native Hawaiian or Pacific Islander alone (NH)	0	0	0	0.00%	0.00%	0.00%
Other race alone (NH)	0	0	10	0.00%	0.00%	0.71%
Mixed race or Multiracial (NH)	1	1	4	0.06%	0.06%	0.28%
Hispanic or Latino (any race)	1,615	1,630	1,320	90.99%	95.66%	93.29%
Total	1,775	1,704	1,415	100.00%	100.00%	100.00%

=== 2000 census ===
As of the census of 2000, there were 1,775 people, 544 households, and 441 families residing in the CDP. The population density was 1,412.5 inhabitants per square mile (545.4/km^{2}). There were 602 housing units at an average density of 479.1 per square mile (185.0/km^{2}). The racial makeup of the CDP was 79.15% White, 0.73% African American, 0.73% Native American, 0.06% Asian, 17.41% from other races, and 1.92% from two or more races. Hispanic or Latino of any race were 90.99% of the population.

There were 544 households, out of which 43.2% had children under the age of 18 living with them, 54.8% were married couples living together, 19.7% had a female householder with no husband present, and 18.9% were non-families. 17.5% of all households were made up of individuals, and 7.7% had someone living alone who was 65 years of age or older. The average household size was 3.26 and the average family size was 3.67.

In the CDP, the population was spread out, with 34.0% under the age of 18, 11.8% from 18 to 24, 25.5% from 25 to 44, 18.8% from 45 to 64, and 9.8% who were 65 years of age or older. The median age was 28 years. For every 100 females, there were 96.8 males. For every 100 females age 18 and over, there were 91.0 males.

The median income for a household in the CDP was $22,534, and the median income for a family was $23,920. Males had a median income of $19,769 versus $14,489 for females. The per capita income for the CDP was $8,963. About 32.6% of families and 31.6% of the population were below the poverty line, including 36.7% of those under age 18 and 40.4% of those age 65 or over.

== Education ==
Rancho Alegre is served by the Alice Independent School District. The district operates Alice High School.
