= Ben Bolt-Palito Blanco High School =

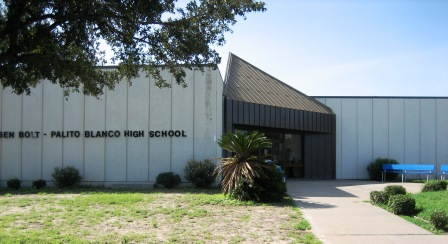
- Ben Bolt-Palito Blanco High School

Location
- 172 Badger Ln. Ben Bolt, Texas 78342-0547; United States; 27.6489°N 98.0806°W

Information
- School type: Public high school
- School district: Ben Bolt-Palito Blanco Independent School District
- Principal: Debbie Guerra
- Teaching staff: 20.06 (FTE)
- Grades: 7-12
- Enrollment: 195 (2023-2024)
- Student to teacher ratio: 9.72
- Colors: Royal Blue & White
- Athletics conference: UIL Class AA
- Mascot: Badgers/Lady Badgers
- Website: Ben Bolt - Palito Blanco High School

Founded in 1954, Ben Bolt-Palito Blanco High School is a public high school located in Ben Bolt, Texas (USA) and classified as a 2A school by the UIL. It is part of the Ben Bolt-Palito Blanco Independent School District located in central Jim Wells County and serves the students of Ben Bolt, Palito Blanco, and the unincorporated Green Acres area. In 2013, the school was rated "Met Standard" by the Texas Education Agency.

The majority of Ben Bolt, Texas lies within the BBPBISD district.

== Athletics ==
=== State Finalists ===
- Football
  - 1976 (Class B)
- Volleyball
  - 1979 (Class 1A)
