= Memorial Stadium (Alice, Texas) =

Stadium in Alice, Texas

Coordinates: 27.75424°N 98.056°W

Memorial Stadium is a multipurpose stadium located in Alice, Texas, United States. Its main use is as a football stadium for the Alice High School Coyotes.

== Awards ==
The stadium won the Best Football Field Award by the Texas Turfgrass Association in 2007 and again in 2008.
