= Nortec Collective =

Mexican musical ensemble

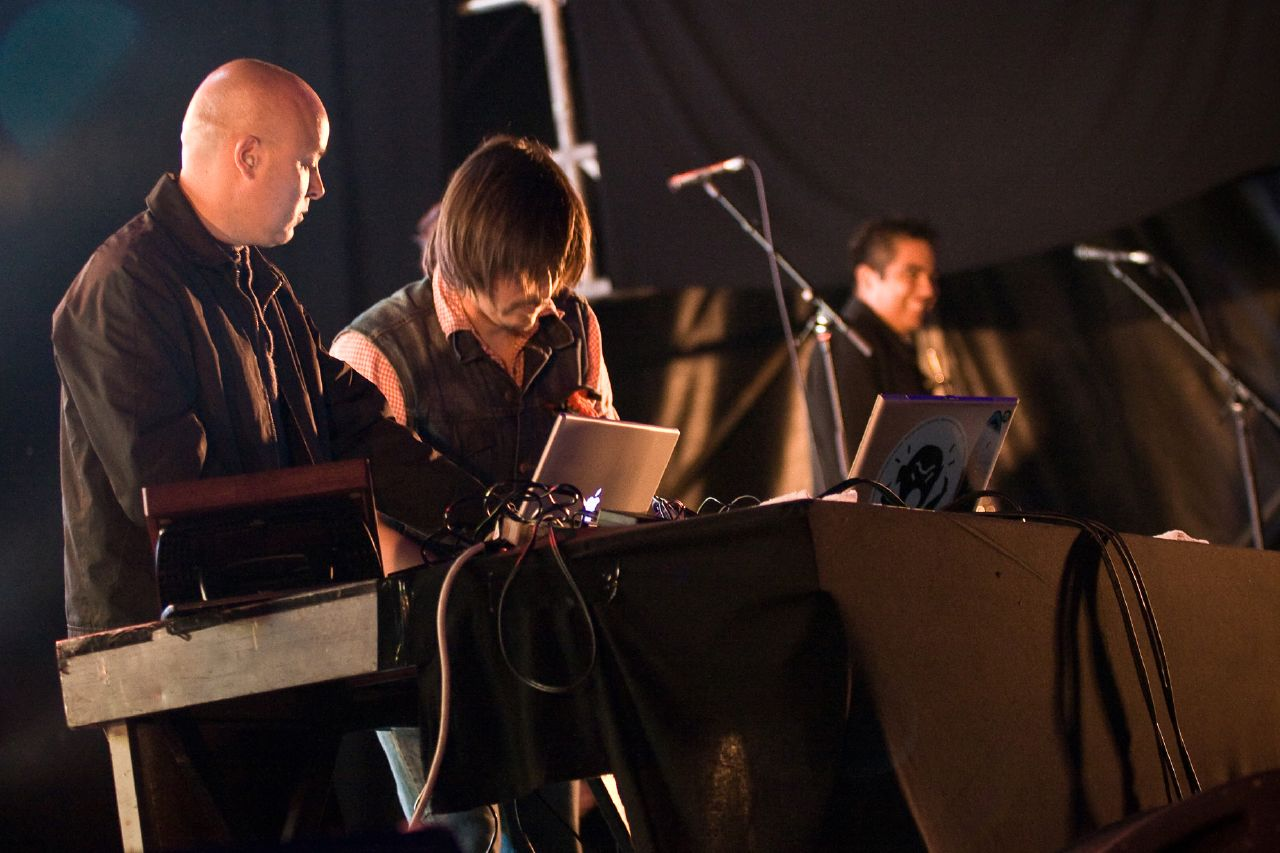

Background information
- Origin: Tijuana, Mexico
- Genres: Electronic, techno, nortec
- Years active: 1999–2008
- Labels: Nacional Records, Palm Records, Mil Records, Nettwerk, Because Music, Sonic 360
- Members: Bostich, Fussible, Hiperboreal, Clorofila
- Past members: Panoptica, Plankton Man, Murcof (aka. Terrestre)
- Website: Nortec Collective

Nortec Collective was a Mexican musical ensemble formed by various individual one- or two-man production projects. The group came together in Tijuana, Baja California, Mexico. Their genre mixes electronic music with musical elements and instrumentation of tambora and norteño music, resulting in the nortec ("norteño" + "techno") style. The various projects began producing and performing nortec music around 1999. In 2001, they were signed to a recording contract with Palm Pictures, and released their first album, Tijuana Session Volume 1, under the name Nortec Collective. The line-up for that album included Bostich, Clorofila, Fussible, Hiperboreal, Panoptica, Plankton Man and Terrestre. The latter two would leave Nortec Collective in 2002.

Nortec Collective's second album, Tijuana Sessions, Vol. 3 (Nacional Records), received much critical praise and was nominated for two Latin Grammy awards in 2006.

In 2008, Nortec Collective ceased to function as a proper collective, with the various individual projects performing and recording separately. According to the Collective's Myspace page, "For the time being, Nortec Collective has decided to release music separately..." and "Until further notice, there will be not be any bookings for Nortec, Nortec Collective or Colectivo Nortec with the full four member line-up."

The various individual projects went on to release and perform separately. 2008's Tijuana Sound Machine by Bostich and Fussible (Nacional Records) was nominated for the Grammy Award for Best Latin Rock/Alternative Album.

The Nortec Collective has borrowed several elements of Banda music sub-culture and have used them both in their songs ("Narcoteque", "Almada") and in their visuals and album covers.

== Performances and projects ==
Since 1999, the Nortec Collective musicians have toured throughout the United States, Mexico, Europe, Japan and Latin America. They have played New York's Central Park SummerStage and Irving Plaza, as well as the Winter Music Conference in Miami, the Kennedy Center in Washington, D.C., and shows at the Royal Festival Hall in London and Elysée Montmartre in Paris.

Former Mexican President Ernesto Zedillo invited Nortec to provide music for the Mexican pavilion at the Expo 2000 in Hannover, and they have done remixes for Beck, Calexico, Ennio Morricone, Kronos quartet, Leigh Nash, and Lenny Kravitz among others.

In 2006 Nortec performed at the LA Weekly Detour Festival in Los Angeles, sharing the bill with Beck, Queens of the Stone Age, and Basement Jaxx. The band also performed "Que Bonita Bailas" for the AIDS benefit album Silencio=Muerte: Red Hot + Latin Redux produced by the Red Hot Organization.

Nortec's music has appeared in commercials for Volvo, Dell, Fidelity Mutual, Edwin Jeans (with Brad Pitt), and Nissan.

The song "Tijuana Makes Me Happy" is on the soundtrack 2006 FIFA World Cup Germany, the video game by EA Sports, and is the title song of the feature film by the same name by Dylan Verrechia.

An interactive book entitled Paso del Nortec: This Is Tijuana dedicated to the Nortec phenomenon was released in the US, Mexico and Europe in 2004.

In 2005, Nortec Collective released their most acclaimed work to date, the album Tijuana Sessions, Vol. 3, which received two Latin Grammy nominations and earned significant airplay on tastemaker radio stations like KCRW (Los Angeles), KEXP (Seattle) and KUT (Austin). The omission of a second volume was thought to have been in imitation of the Traveling Wilburys' intentional numbering of their two albums as Volumes 1 and 3, but it was more in reference to an unfinished Volume 2 album that was not released.

The book Nor-tec Rifa!: Electronic Dance Music from Tijuana to the World by Alejandro L. Madrid was published in March 2008. It describes nortec music's composition process and its relation to the nortena, banda, and grupera traditions.

In 2008 the album Nortec Collective Presents Bostich + Fussible: Tijuana Sound Machine was released. Corridos Urbanos by Clorofila was released in 2010. Bulevar 2000 by Bostich + Fussible was released in 2010 on Nacional Records.

In 2008, Nortec released a music video for their song "Polaris", created by Heath Ledger's film collective, The Masses.

They released what was stated to be their final album, Motel Baja, on 16 September 2014 – Mexican Independence Day.

In April 2015, Nortec Collective: Bostich+Fussible performed a live/DJ set for Boiler Room in Mexico City.

As of 2020, Nortec: Bostich+Fussible have been the most active duo of the former collective, performing at Coachella, Glastonbury, PortAmerica, Vive Latino and numerous venues around the world.

== Recognition ==
Nortec Collective's album Tijuana Sessions, Vol. 3 received two Latin Grammy nominations in 2006 for "Best Alternative Music Album" and "Best Recording Package."

The 2008 album Tijuana Sound Machine by Bostich and Fussible was nominated for Best Latin Rock/Alternative Album for the 51st Grammy Awards.

== Discography ==
- Nortec Sampler (1999)
- Nortec Collective: The Spaced TJ Dub EP (1999)
- Bostich+Fussible: Nortec (2001)
- The Tijuana Sessions Vol. 1 (2001)
- Nortec Experimental (2001)
- Panoptica: 01 * 02 * 03 * 04 (2001)
- ¡Terrestre vs Planktonman! (2003)
- The Tijuana Sessions Vol. 3 (26 July 2005)
- Nortec Collective Presents Bostich+Fussible - Tijuana Sound Machine (29 April 2008)
- Nortec Collective Presents Clorofila: Corridos Urbanos (13 April 2010)
- Nortec Collective Presents: Bostich+Fussible - Bulevar 2000 (14 September 2010)
- Nortec Collective Presents: Bostich+Fussible - Norteña Del Sur (4 November 2010) used in Kinect Adventures!
- Nortec Collective: Hiperboreal - Border Revolver (5 May 2012)
- Nortec Collective Presents: Bostich+Fussible - Motel Baja (16 September 2014)

== Bibliography ==
- Paso del Nortec. This is Tijuana. José Manuel Valenzuela. Trilce Editores 2004
- Rockin the Americas. The Global Politics of Rock in Latin/o America. Deborah Pacini, Susana Ascencio. UNiversity of Pittsburgh. 2004
- Loops -una historia sobre la música electronica-. Javier Blánquez. Reservoir Editores. 2005.
- Nor-tec Rifa Electronic Dance Music from Tijuana to the World. Alejandro L. Madrid Oxford University Press. 2008.

== See also ==
- Nopal Beat Records
