= Ben Bolt-Palito Blanco Independent School District =

School district in Texas, United States

Location
- Ben Bolt, Texas ESC Region 2 USA
- Coordinates: 27.56807°N 98.11209°W

District information
- Type: Independent school district
- Grades: Pre-K through 12
- Superintendent: Timothy Little
- Schools: 2 (2012-2013)
- NCES District ID: 4809870

Students and staff
- Students: 597 (2010-11)
- Teachers: 49.87 (2009-10) (on full-time equivalent (FTE) basis)
- Student–teacher ratio: 12.17 (2009-10)
- Athletic conference: UIL Class AA
- District mascot: Badgers
- Colors: Royal Blue, White

Other information
- TEA District Accountability Rating for 2011: Academically Acceptable
- Website: www.bbpbschools.net

The Ben Bolt-Palito Blanco Independent School District - or “BBPBISD” - is located in Jim Wells County in South Texas off U.S. Route 281 in Ben Bolt, Texas. The district operates two schools, both of which are located in Ben Bolt: Ben Bolt-Palito Blanco High School, which serves grades 7-12, and Ben Bolt-Palito Blanco Elementary School, serving grades PK-6. Palito Blanco Elementary School, located in Palito Blanco, was permanently closed in 2012.

BBPBISD serves all of Ben Bolt, Texas, Palito Blanco, Texas, and the unicorporated Green Acres area north of Ben Bolt.

== Finances ==
As of the 2010–2011 school year, the appraised valuation of property in the district was $70,626,000. The maintenance tax rate was $0.104 and the bond tax rate was $0.027 per $100 of appraised valuation.

== Academic achievement ==
In 2011, the school district was rated "academically acceptable" by the Texas Education Agency.

== Schools ==
As of the 2012-13 school year, the district was operating two schools.

- Ben Bolt-Palito Blanco High School (Grades 7-12)
- Ben Bolt-Palito Blanco Elementary School (Grades PK-8)

== Notable alumni ==
- Sylvia Garcia, former Texas State Senator and current U.S. House of Representatives.

== See also ==
- List of school districts in Texas
