= Alice Independent School District =

School district in Texas, United States

Location
- 2 Coyote Trail; Alice, Texas ESC Region 2 USA
- Coordinates: 27°45′25″N 98°3′9″W

District information
- Type: Independent school district
- Grades: Pre-K through 12
- Superintendent: Dr. Anysia R. Trevino
- Schools: 6 (2023-24)
- NCES District ID: 4807800

Students and staff
- Students: 4,369 (2023-24)
- Teachers: 312 (2023-24) (on full-time equivalent (FTE) basis)
- Student–teacher ratio: 14.7 (2021-22)
- Athletic conference: UIL Class 4A Football & Basketball
- District mascot: Coyotes
- Colors: Burnt Orange, White

Other information
- TEA District Accountability Rating for 2011-12: Academically Acceptable
- Website: www.aliceisd.net

Alice Independent School District is a public school district based in Alice, Texas, United States. In addition to Alice, the district also serves the communities of Alice Acres, Amargosa, Coyote Acres, Owl Ranch, Rancho Alegre, and portions of Loma Linda East and Ben Bolt.

== Finances ==
As of the 2010-2011 school year, the appraised valuation of property in the district was $1,086,514,000. The maintenance tax rate was $0.104 and the bond tax rate was $0.026 per $100 of appraised valuation.

== Academic achievement ==
In 2025, the school district was given an overall rating of "B" based on a "scaled score" of 80 by the Texas Education Agency.

In 2017, the 85th Session of the Texas Legislature passed House Bill 22 (H.B. 22), which implemented a new "A-F Accountability Ratings" system. This marked a departure from the naming conventions associated with the previous system, instead standardizing a "scaled score" into conventional letter grades, with A being an outstanding rating and F being a failing rating. Prior to the implementation of the new rating system in 2017, a school district in Texas could receive one of four possible rankings from the Texas Education Agency: Exemplary (the highest possible ranking), Recognized, Academically Acceptable, and Academically Unacceptable (the lowest possible ranking).

During the COVID-19 Pandemic, all Texas school districts were given a rating of "Not Rated: Declared State of Disaster" in accordance with the TEA's Accountability Manual.

In 2011, the school district was rated "Academically Acceptable." Forty-nine percent of districts in Texas in 2011 received the same rating. No state accountability ratings were given to districts in 2012.

Historical district TEA accountability ratings

- 2025: Accountability Rating of "B"
- 2024: Accountability Rating of "C"
- 2023: Accountability Rating of "D"
- 2022: Accountability Rating of "C"
- 2021: Not Rated: Declared State of Disaster
- 2020: Not Rated: Declared State of Disaster
- 2019: Accountability Rating of "B"
- 2011: Academically Acceptable
- 2010: Recognized
- 2009: Academically Unacceptable
- 2008: Academically Acceptable
- 2007: Academically Acceptable
- 2006: Academically Acceptable
- 2005: Academically Acceptable
- 2004: Academically Acceptable

== Schools ==
In the 2021-2022 school year, the district had students in six schools.

High schools

- Alice High School (Grades 9-12)

Middle schools

- Adams Middle (Grades 6-8)

Elementary schools

- Dubose Elementary (Grades PK-5)
- Noonan Elementary (Grades PK-5)
- Saenz Elementary (Grades PK-5)
- Schallert Elementary (Grades PK-5)

Prior to 2019, Alice ISD closed Garcia Elementary School. As part of a bond program approved by voters in May 2019, Alice ISD closed Memorial Intermediate, Hillcrest Elementary, and Salazar Elementary, and made additions and renovations at the 6 remaining schools.

== Special programs ==
=== Athletics ===
Alice High School participates in the boys sports of baseball, basketball, football, soccer, and power lifting. The school participates in the girls sports of basketball, soccer, softball, power lifting and volleyball. For the 2019 through 2023 school years, Alice High School will play football in UIL Class 4A.

== See also ==
- List of school districts in Texas
- List of high schools in Texas
