= Ben Bolt, Texas =

- Census-designated place
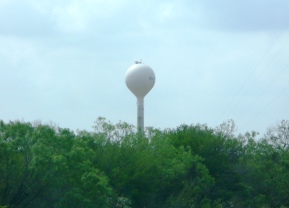
- Water tower in Ben Bolt

- Location within Texas Location within the United States
- Coordinates: 27°38′51″N 98°5′0″W
- Country: United States
- State: Texas
- County: Jim Wells County

Population (2020)
  - Total: 1,662
- Time zone: CST
  - Summer (DST): CDT
- ZIP code: 78342
- Area code: 361
- FIPS code: 48-07540

Ben Bolt is an unincorporated community and census-designated place (CDP) in south central Jim Wells County, Texas, United States, 7 miles (11 km) south of Alice on U.S. Route 281. It was first listed as a CDP in the 2020 census, with a population of 1,662.

== History ==
Ben Bolt was founded in 1904. The community took its name from the popular song "Ben Bolt and Sweet Alice".

== Geography ==
Ben Bolt is located at 27°38′51″N 98°5′0″W (27.6475, -98.08333).

== Education ==
Most of Ben Bolt is served by the Ben Bolt-Palito Blanco ISD. A small portion is within the Alice Independent School District. The schools of the former district include Palito Blanco Elementary School for grades K-3, Ben Bolt Middle School for grades 4-8, and Ben Bolt-Palito Blanco High School for grades 9-12. Alice High School is of the latter district.

== Demographics ==
Historical population
Census	Pop.	Note	%±
2020	1,662		—
U.S. Decennial Census; 1850–1900 1910; 1920 1930 1940; 1950 1960 1970; 1980 1990 2000; 2010 2020

Ben Bolt first appeared as a census designated place in the 2020 U.S. census.

=== 2020 census ===
Ben Bolt CDP, Texas – Racial and ethnic composition Note: the US Census treats Hispanic/Latino as an ethnic category. This table excludes Latinos from the racial categories and assigns them to a separate category. Hispanics/Latinos may be of any race.
Race / Ethnicity (NH = Non-Hispanic)	Pop 2020	% 2020
White alone (NH)	159	9.57%
Black or African American alone (NH)	3	0.18%
Native American or Alaska Native alone (NH)	3	0.18%
Asian alone (NH)	1	0.06%
Native Hawaiian or Pacific Islander alone (NH)	0	0.00%
Other race alone (NH)	2	0.12%
Mixed race or Multiracial (NH)	8	0.48%
Hispanic or Latino (any race)	1,486	89.41%
Total	1,662	100.00%
