= Plankton Man =

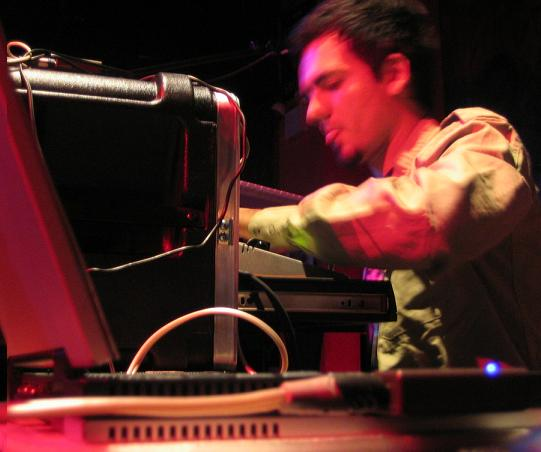
- Live performance

Background information
- Also known as: Nino Astronauta
- Born: Ignacio Chavez
- Origin: Mexico
- Genres: Electronic, breakbeat
- Occupation: Musician
- Instruments: Sampler, MIDI controller
- Years active: 2000–present
- Label: StaticDiscos
- Website: www.planktonman.com

Plankton Man (born Ignacio Chavez, Nashio for short) is a Mexican musician and former founding member of the Nortec Collective. His music is inspired by traditional Mexican music such as the brass banda and the accordion accents of norteño music, as well as jazz and electronic music elements.

== Biography ==
Planktonman began his career in the early 1990s in his native Ensenada, Baja California as a guitarist for the now defunct electro-rock group Sonios. The band became well known throughout northwestern Mexico and southern California's Latin music scene. He then began solo work in electronic breakbeat music.

Nashio is also half of the new duo Kobol, alongside Argel Medina (Arhkota), the drummer of Niño Astronauta. Their sound is a mixture of organic glitch music and digital jazz played live with drum pads and a laptop.

== Discography ==
- The Tijuana Sessions, Vol. 1: Nortec Collective (Palm Pictures)
- Plankton Man vs Terrestre (Run Recordings)
- "El Sinaloense" : Remix for Kronos Quartet (on the album Nuevo) / Released by (Nonesuch Records)
- Feel My China Ii track: "Mexican Pencil Box Mix" : Remix for Mochipet / Released by (Daly City Records)

== Television work ==
- "My Kingdom", Honda RidgeLine advertisement
- "A Day in Life", Honda Civic advertisement
- "Los Alacranes", Telemundo

== Scoring ==
- "Collaboration with Mark De Gli Antoni on the scoring for Cherish (film)"
- "Featured track 'Lazer Metrayeta' on 411VM Skateboarding DVD #57", Vans
