= Panoptica =

Mexican electronic musician

- Born: Roberto Alonso Mendoza Lopez
- Genres: Electronic
- Years active: Late 1980s–present

Roberto Alonso Mendoza Lopez, known as Panoptica, has been one of the figures in the Mexican electronic music scene since the late 1980s, founding bands like electro pos-industrial outfit Artefakto and in the late 1990s, being part of the Tijuana-based norteña-meets-techno Nortec Collective.

== Biography ==
Mendoza has also been releasing tracks as Panóptic and has been one of the figures in the Mexican electronic music scene since the late 1980s, founding bands like electro pos-industrial outfit Artefakto and in the late 1990s, being part of the Tijuana-based norteña-meets-techno Nortec Collective. He has been invited by English DJ John Peel to do one of his Peel sessions for the BBC in 2001. In 2005, Mendoza had finished two projects, "Desierto" and "Mendoza", in collaboration with David J. (Bauhaus, Love and Rockets) on bass and guitars.

In late 2007, he separated from the Nortec Collective and created the "Nortec Panoptica Orchestra" a band for his live shows, and in early 2008, decided to record a new solo album to push and further develop the electronic sound, working independently from the Tijuana collective with new musical partners (Zoell Farrujia (Ambiente), Benjamin Rivera (Grupo de Acero), Edgar Hernandez (Banda Aguacaliente), Adrian Rodriguez (Koñorteño)), and guest musicians (Javiera Mena, Khan Oral, Yerba Buena). The album was released in March 2010 on Vinyl LP and digital form.

== Studio albums ==
Title	Year	Details
Title	Year	Notes
Panoptica Orchestra	2010	Released: June 15, 2010; Label: LOV/RECS (México); Formats: Vinyl, CD; Guests: Javiera Mena ("Complejo de amor"), Khan Oral ("Time ends"), Cucú Diamantes ("Tu sabes"), Alma Velasco ("Ven a mi"); Debut album as Panoptica Orchestra; produced independently after departure from Nortec Collective; Special edition released with a second disc of remixes (Panoptica Orchestra – Edición Especial)
Bajos Tiempos	2016	Released: ca. 2016; Label: NPO Music; Formats: Digital; Guests: Leo Stragno ("Cenizas")
Border Frequencies	2020	Released: September 18, 2020; Label: NPO Music; Formats: Digital; Tracklist: "El Mitote", "Tijuanights", "Sintonía Pop", "Radio Ranchito", "El Arca de Neón", "Triki Tran"; 6-track album

== Other releases ==
Title	Year	Type	Notes
Mumbai Express	TBD	EP / Album	Label: NPO Music; Formats: Digital; Cited by Mendoza as the project where he began experimenting with downtempo beats and Middle Eastern influences
Cumbia del bordo	TBD	EP / Album	Label: NPO Music; Formats: Digital
Remixed	TBD	Remix album / compilation	Label: NPO Music; Formats: Digital; Remix collection of Panoptica Orchestra material
Fotonovela	2021	Single / Track	Released: January 30, 2021; Label: NPO Music; Formats: Digital

== Compilation appearances ==
Title	Year	Notes
The Tijuana Sessions Vol. 1	2001	As member of Nortec Collective; Label: Palm Pictures / Rykodisc
Tijuana Sessions Vol. 3	2005	As member of Nortec Collective; Label: Nacional Records
The Tijuana Remixes	2002	As Panóptica (solo); Contains "Mumbai Express (Tijuana Dub Mix)"; Label: Certificate 18 / Domino Records (UK)
Sound Trip Mexico	2009	Compilation; Label: Reise Know-How Sound (Germany)
