= Nortec =

Electronic music genre from Mexico

- Stylistic origins: Techno, norteño
- Cultural origins: Early-2000s Tijuana, Mexico

Nortec or nor-tec (from the combination of "norteño" and "techno") is a genre of electronic dance music developed in Tijuana (a border city in Baja California, Mexico) that first gained popularity in 2001. Nortec music is characterized by hard dance beats and samples from traditional forms of Mexican music such as Banda sinaloense and Norteño - unmistakably Mexican horns are often used.

Different individual projects create nortec music. There is also a "Colectivo Visual": a group of designers and VJs who take care of the visual side of nortec live shows. The term nortec is a conjunction of norteño ("of" or "from the North") and techno, but mainly describes the collision between the music, style and culture of electronic music with those of norteño and tambora, two music genres indigenous to the North of Mexico. These styles are characterized by their use of accordions and double bass (norteño); tubas, clarinets, horns and pumping bass drums (tambora) and quirky use of percussion and polyrhythmic snare drum rolls (both). All of these elements are used to create a sound that is very Tijuana-like.

== History ==
Nortec originated in 1999 when Pepe Mogt started by experimenting with samples of old banda sinaloense and norteño albums and altering them on his computer or filtering them with analog synthesizers. He had picked up on the idea by listening to the percussive and angular grooves of the tambora and norteña music played at a family social event. Through some contacts in recording studios located in Tijuana's notorious Zona Norte red light district, Pepe compiled tracks of isolated instruments from multitrack recording of tambora and norteño demo recordings that had been abandoned at the studios by the bands that recorded them. He began to burn these tracks onto CD-Rs, which he would later distribute to friends under the condition that they make a new track using the material.

Those first raw tracks were compiled onto the "Nor-tec Sampler", the first release from Mil Records followed by the release "The Tijuana Sessions Vol. 1" and then "The Tijuana Sessions Vol. 3".
