= Alejandro L. Madrid =

American musicologist and cultural theorist (born 1968)

- Born: Alejandro Luis Madrid-González; 1968 (age 57–58); Houston, Texas, U.S.
- Awards: Humboldt Prize, Guggenheim Fellowship, Dent Medal, Philip Brett Award, Robert M. Stevenson Award, LASA-Mexico's Humanities Book Award, Ruth A. Solie Award, Woody Guthrie Book Award, Premio de Musicología Casa de las Américas, Premio de Musicología Samuel Claro Valdés

Academic background
- Education: Ohio State University (Ph.D., 2003)
- Thesis: Writing Modernist and Avant-Garde Music in Mexico. Performativity, Transculturation, and Identity after the Revolution, 1920-30 (2003)

Academic work
- Institutions: Harvard University
- Website: music.fas.harvard.edu/people/alejandro-l-madrid

Alejandro Luis Madrid-González (born August 25, 1968) is an American music scholar, cultural theorist, and professor, whose research focuses on Latino and Latin American musics and sound practices. He is the Walter W. Naumburg Professor of Music at Harvard University.

== Biography ==
Madrid received a B.M. in guitar performance from The Boston Conservatory, an M.F.A. in music performance from SUNY Purchase, an M.M. in musicology from University of North Texas, and a Ph.D. in musicology with a minor in comparative cultural studies from the Ohio State University.

Madrid is a recipient of the Humboldt Prize, a Guggenheim Fellowship, the Dent Medal given by the Royal Musical Association and the International Musicological Society for "outstanding contributions to musicology", the 2016 Humanities Book Award from the Latin American Studies Association-Mexico Section, the 2018 Philip Brett Award from the American Musicological Society (AMS), the Robert M. Stevenson Award from the AMS, in 2016 and 2014, the 2012 Ruth A. Solie Award from the AMS, the 2010 Woody Guthrie Book Award from the International Association for the Study of Popular Music-US Branch, and the 2005 Casa de las Américas Prize for Latin American Musicology

He has been invited to deliver national and international keynote addresses and lectureships, including the Bruno and Wanda Nettl Distinguished Lecture in Ethnomusicology at the University of Illinois at Urbana-Champaign.

== Awards and honors ==
Year	Award
2023	Humboldt Prize
2022	Guggenheim Fellowship
2022	Honorable Mention, Portia K. Maultsby Prize Society for Ethnomusicology
2022	Bronze Medal, Best Biography in English International Latino Book Awards
2018	Philip Brett Award, American Musicological Society
2017	Dent Medal, Royal Musical Association
2016	Robert M. Stevenson Award, American Musicological Society
2016	Mexico Humanities Book Award, Latin American Studies Association
2014	Robert M. Stevenson Award, American Musicological Society
2014	Béla Bartók Award, American Society of Composers, Authors and Publishers Deems Taylor/Virgil Thomson Awards
2013	Ruth A. Solie Award, American Musicological Society
2009	The Woody Guthrie Award, International Association for the Study of Popular Music-U.S. Branch
2005	Premio de Musicología Casa de las Américas
2002	Premio de Musicología Samuel Claro Valdés, Pontificia Universidad Católica de Chile
2001	A-R Editions Award, American Musicological Society-Midwest Chapter

== Bibliography ==
=== Books ===
- The Archive and the Aural City. Sound, Knowledge, and the Politics of Listening (2025) ISBN 978-1478032113
- Tania León's Stride. A Polyrhythmic Life (2021) ISBN 978-0252086014
- In Search of Julián Carrillo and Sonido 13 (2015) ISBN 978-0190215781
- Danzón. Circum-Caribbean Dialogues in Music and Dance (co-authored with Robin D. Moore, 2013) ISBN 978-0199965823
- Music in Mexico (2012) ISBN 978-0199812806
- Nor-Tec Rifa! Electronic Dance Music from Tijuana to the World (2008) ISBN 978-0195342628
- Los sonidos de la nación moderna. Música, cultura e ideas en el México posrevolucionario, 1920-1930 (2008) ISBN 978-9592602274; English translation: Sounds of the Modern Nation. Music, Culture, and Ideas in Post-Revolutionary Mexico (2009) ISBN 978-1592136940

=== Edited volumes ===
- Experimentalisms in Practice. Music Perspectives from Latin America (co-edited with Ana Alonso-Minutti and Eduardo Herrera, 2018) ISBN 978-0190842758
- Transnational Encounters. Music and Performance at the U.S.-Mexico Border (2011) ISBN 9780199735938
- Postnational Musical Identities. Cultural Production, Distribution, and Consumption in a Globalized Scenario (co-edited with Ignacio Corona, 2007) ISBN 978-0739118214

=== Essays and other short works ===
- “Listening through the Colonial Noise: Things, Sound Objects, and Legacy at the Berliner Phonogramm-Archiv.” Journal of the American Musicological Society, Vol. 78, No. 1 (2025): 195-240.
- “Rastreando las huellas de la escucha performativa: la escritura como constelación archivística.” Anuario Musical, No. 76 (2021): 11-30.
- “Entre/tejiendo vidas y discursos: notas y reflexiones en torno a la biografía y la anti-biografía musical.” Revista Argentina de Musicología, Vol. 22, No. 1 (2021): 19-43.
- “Secreto a voces: Excess, Vocality, and Jotería in the Performance of Juan Gabriel.” GLQ: A Journal of Lesbian and Gay Studies, Vol. 24, No. 1 (2018): 85–111.
- “Diversity, Tokenism, Non-Canonical Musics, and the Crisis of the Humanities in U.S. Academia." Journal of Music History Pedagogy, Vol. 7, No. 2 (2017): 124–129.
- Madrid, Alejandro L. and Robin D. Moore, “Cuestiones de género: el danzón como un complejo de performance." Boletín Música, No. 42 (2016): 3-55.
- “Landscapes and Gimmicks from the 'Sounded City': Listening for the Nation at the Sound Archive." Sound Studies. An Interdisciplinary Journal, Vol. II, No. 2 (2016): 119–136.
- “Más que ‘tontas canciones de amor’: Sentimentalismo cosmopolita en la balada romántica de México en los 1970s y 1980s,” in Canção romantica. Intimidade, mediação e identidade na América Latina, ed. by Martha Ulhoa and Simone Luci Pereira, 47-69. Rio de Janeiro: Folio Digital, 2016.
- “Renovation, Rupture, and Restoration: The Modernist Musical Experience in Latin America,” in The Modernist World, ed. by Stephen Ross and Allana C. Lindgren, 409–416. New York and London: Routledge, 2015.
- “Rigo Tovar, Cumbia, and the Transnational Grupero Boom,” in Cumbia!: Scenes of a Migrant Latin American Music Genre, ed. by Héctor Fernández L’Hoeste and Pablo Vila, 105–118. Durham, NC: Duke University Press, 2013.
- “Cantar la negritud: capeyuye e identidad mascoga en la frontera México-Estados Unidos." Boletín Música, No. 32 (2012): 3-22.
- “Music, Media Spectacle, and the Idea of Democracy. The Case of DJ Kermit’s ‘Gober,’” in Media, Sound, and Culture in Latin America and the Caribbean, ed. by Alejandra Bronfman and Andrew G. Wood, 71-84. Pittsburgh: University of Pittsburgh Press, 2012.
- “American Music in Times of Postnationality.” Journal of the American Musicological Society, Vol. 63, No. 3 (2011): 699–703.
- “Música y nacionalismos en Latinoamérica,” in A tres bandas. Mestizaje, sincretismo e hibridación en el espacio sonoro iberoamericano (s. XVI-s. XX), ed. by Albert Recasens and Christian Spencer Espinoza, 227–235. Madrid: SEACEX, 2010.
- “The Sounds of the Nation: Visions of Modernity and Tradition in Mexico’s First National Congress of Music.” Hispanic American Historical Review, Vol. 86, No. 4 (2006): 681–706.
- "Dancing with Desire. Cultural Embodiment and Negotiation in Tijuana's Nor-Tec Music and Dance." Popular Music, Vol. 25, No. 3 (2006): 383–399.
- “Imagining Modernity, Revising Tradition. Nor-tec Music in Tijuana and Other Borders.” Popular Music and Society, Vol. 28, No. 5 (2005): 595–618.
- “Navigating Ideologies in ‘In-Between’ Cultures. Signifying Practices in Nor-tec Music.” Latin American Music Review, Vol. 24, No. 2 (2003): 270-286.
- “Transculturación, performatividad e identidad en la Sinfonía No. 1 de Julián Carrillo.” Resonancias, No. 12 (2003): 61–86.
