= Harding Gill Tract, Texas =

- Census-designated place
- Location within Texas Location within the United States
- Coordinates: 26°25′55″N 98°0′55″W
- Country: United States
- State: Texas
- County: Hidalgo

Area
  - Total: 1.10 sq mi (2.84 km^{2})
  - Land: 1.10 sq mi (2.84 km^{2})
  - Water: 0 sq mi (0.0 km^{2})
- Elevation: 64 ft (20 m)
- Time zone: UTC-6 (Central (CST))
  - Summer (DST): UTC-5 (CDT)
- ZIP Code: 78549 (Hargill)
- Area code: 956
- FIPS code: 48-32246
- GNIS feature ID: 2805791

Harding Gill Tract is an unincorporated community and census-designated place (CDP) in Hidalgo County, Texas, United States. As of the 2020 census, Harding Gill Tract had a population of 21. It was first listed as a CDP prior to the 2020 census.

It is in the northeastern part of the county, bordered to the north by Hargill. It is 18 miles (29 km) northeast of Edinburg, the county seat.

== Demographics ==
Historical population
Census	Pop.	Note	%±
2020	21		—
U.S. Decennial Census; 1850–1900 1910; 1920 1930 1940; 1950 1960 1970; 1980 1990 2000; 2010 2020

Harding Gill Tract first appeared as a census designated place in the 2020 U.S. census.

=== 2020 census ===
Harding Gill Tract CDP, Texas – Racial and ethnic composition Note: the US Census treats Hispanic/Latino as an ethnic category. This table excludes Latinos from the racial categories and assigns them to a separate category. Hispanics/Latinos may be of any race.
Race / Ethnicity (NH = Non-Hispanic)	Pop 2020	% 2020
White alone (NH)	0	0.00%
Black or African American alone (NH)	0	0.00%
Native American or Alaska Native alone (NH)	0	0.00%
Asian alone (NH)	0	0.00%
Native Hawaiian or Pacific Islander alone (NH)	0	0.00%
Other race alone (NH)	1	4.76%
Mixed race or Multiracial (NH)	0	0.00%
Hispanic or Latino (any race)	20	95.24%
Total	21	100.00%

== Education ==
Part is in the Edinburg Consolidated Independent School District, and part is in the Monte Alto Independent School District.

All of the Edinburg CISD portion is zoned to Hargill Elementary School, and its area middle school is Harwell Middle School. The ECISD portion of Harding Gill Tract is split between Edinburg North High School and Johnny Economedes High School.
