= Edinburg High School =

Public school in Texas, United States

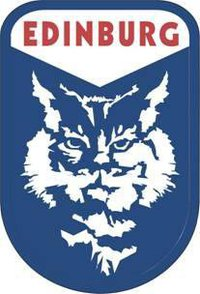

Location
- 2600 E. Wisconsin Road; Edinburg, Texas 78542; United States; 26.2642°N 98.1417°W

Information
- Type: Public high school
- Established: 1917
- School district: Edinburg Consolidated Independent School District
- Principal: Dominic Pena
- Teaching staff: 166.59 (FTE)
- Grades: 9-12
- Enrollment: 2,352 (2023-2024)
- Student to teacher ratio: 14.12
- Colors: Red, blue, and white
- Athletics conference: University Interscholastic League 6A
- Nickname: Bobcats
- Website: edinburg.ecisd.us

Edinburg High School (EHS) is a comprehensive public high school in Edinburg, Texas, United States. It is operated by the Edinburg Consolidated Independent School District along with Edinburg North High School, Robert Vela High School, and Johnny G. Economedes High School. It has enrolled 2,927 students and 175 staff, with 35% holding advanced degrees; its enrollment is 95% Hispanic, 4% White, and 1% Asian/Pacific Islander.

A performing arts complex was built at Edinburg in 2010, during which time similar facilities were built at the other high schools.

Edinburg High serves sections of southeastern Edinburg along with several census-designated places: Murillo, San Carlos, and a portion of Lopezville.

== History ==
It was previously in Murillo (formerly Nurillo), a census-designated place in Hidalgo County, Texas. It was previously outside the Edinburg city limits.

In 2013, the City of Edinburg annexed about 2,000 acres (810 ha) of land, including the plot the school is located on. The school is now a part of the Edinburg city limits, and it is no longer in the Murillo CDP.

== Notable alumni ==
- David V. Aguilar, Former Chief of the United States Border Patrol
- Gloria E. Anzaldúa, American scholar, author, poet and activist
- Cathy Baker, Actress, painter
- Alfredo Cantu Gonzalez, recipient of the Medal of Honor
- Gustavo de la Viña, Former Chief of the United States Border Patrol
- J.E. "Eddie" Guerra, Sheriff of Hidalgo County
- Jim Wright, American football player and coach
- Bobby Pulido, singer, songwriter, actor

== Emmanuel Duron Incident ==
In December 2020, the school received national attention after Emmanuel Duron, a defensive lineman on the football team who had been named District 31-6A defensive player of the year in 2019, attacked referee Alfredo "Fred" Gracia during the first half of the zone play-in playoff game against Pharr-San Juan-Alamo High School. Duron was ejected from the game for two unsportsmanlike penalties when he attacked Garcia and left him with a concussion; the player was escorted off the field and out of the stadium by police and was charged with Class A assault and was released from county jail after posting a $10,000 bail. Edinburg would win the game 35–21. However, school district officials forfeited the game to Pharr the following day due to Duron's actions. Had the district not acted, the UIL would have done so. The UI placed Edinburg's entire athletic program on probation for two years through the 2022-23 season.
