= Murillo, Texas =

- Census-designated place
- Coordinates: 26°16′2″N 98°7′54″W
- Country: United States of America
- State: Texas
- County: Hidalgo

Area
  - Total: 6.9 sq mi (18.0 km^{2})
  - Land: 6.9 sq mi (18.0 km^{2})
  - Water: 0 sq mi (0.0 km^{2})
- Elevation: 95 ft (29 m)

Population (2020)
  - Total: 9,158
  - Density: 1,320/sq mi (509/km^{2})
- Time zone: UTC-6 (Central (CST))
  - Summer (DST): UTC-5 (CDT)
- ZIP code: 78542
- Area code: 956
- FIPS code: 48-50092
- GNIS feature ID: 2408961

Murillo, previously recorded as Nurillo, is a census-designated place (CDP) in Hidalgo County, Texas, United States. The population was 9,158 at the 2020 census. It is part of the McAllen–Edinburg–Mission Metropolitan Statistical Area.

== History ==
In 2013, the City of Edinburg annexed about 2,000 acres (810 ha) of land total. Accordingly, the size of Murillo decreased as of the 2020 U.S. census.

== Geography ==
Murillo is located in south-central Hidalgo County at 26°16′2″N 98°7′54″W (26.267091, -98.131725). It is bordered to the west by Edinburg, the county seat, to the southwest by Lopezville, to the south by San Juan, and to the north by Cesar Chavez.

According to the United States Census Bureau, the Murillo CDP has a total area of 6.9 square miles (18.0 km^{2}), all land.

== Demographics ==
Historical population
Census	Pop.	Note	%±
2000	5,056		—
2010	7,344		45.3%
2020	9,158		24.7%
U.S. Decennial Census; 1850–1900 1910; 1920 1930 1940; 1950 1960 1970; 1980 1990 2000; 2010 2020

Murillo first appeared as a census designated place under the name Nurillo in the 2000 U.S. census. The name was corrected to Murillo for the 2010 U.S. census.

=== 2020 census ===
Murillo CDP, Texas – Racial and ethnic composition Note: the US Census treats Hispanic/Latino as an ethnic category. This table excludes Latinos from the racial categories and assigns them to a separate category. Hispanics/Latinos may be of any race.
Race / Ethnicity (NH = Non-Hispanic)	Pop 2000	Pop 2010	Pop 2020	% 2000	% 2010	% 2020
White alone (NH)	151	190	223	2.99%	2.59%	2.44%
Black or African American alone (NH)	11	32	6	0.22%	0.44%	0.07%
Native American or Alaska Native alone (NH)	0	0	9	0.00%	0.00%	0.10%
Asian alone (NH)	0	56	56	0.00%	0.76%	0.61%
Pacific Islander alone (NH)	0	1	0	0.00%	0.01%	0.00%
Some Other Race alone (NH)	1	0	26	0.02%	0.00%	0.28%
Mixed race or Multiracial (NH)	4	5	18	0.08%	0.07%	0.20%
Hispanic or Latino (any race)	4,889	7,060	8,820	96.70%	96.13%	96.31%
Total	5,056	7,344	9,158	100.00%	100.00%	100.00%

As of the census of 2000, there were 5,056 people, 1,231 households, and 1,144 families residing in the CDP. The population density was 726.0 inhabitants per square mile (280.3/km^{2}). There were 1,329 housing units at an average density of 190.8 per square mile (73.7/km^{2}). The racial makeup of the CDP was 75.95% White, 0.34% African American, 0.32% Native American, 21.02% from other races, and 2.37% from two or more races. Hispanic or Latino of any race were 96.70% of the population.

There were 1,231 households, out of which 64.7% had children under the age of 18 living with them, 72.5% were married couples living together, 15.5% had a female householder with no husband present, and 7.0% were non-families. 5.4% of all households were made up of individuals, and 1.8% had someone living alone who was 65 years of age or older. The average household size was 4.11 and the average family size was 4.24.

In the CDP, the population was spread out, with 39.9% under the age of 18, 12.7% from 18 to 24, 28.2% from 25 to 44, 15.3% from 45 to 64, and 3.9% who were 65 years of age or older. The median age was 24 years. For every 100 females, there were 96.7 males. For every 100 females age 18 and over, there were 93.2 males.

The median income for a household in the CDP was $24,645, and the median income for a family was $25,160. Males had a median income of $18,137 versus $15,284 for females. The per capita income for the CDP was $7,611. About 32.8% of families and 38.2% of the population were below the poverty line, including 43.7% of those under age 18 and 37.6% of those age 65 or over.

== Education ==
Murillo is served by the Edinburg Consolidated Independent School District.

Two elementary schools are in the CDP boundaries: M. D. Betts Elementary School and Dr. Thomas Esparza Elementary School. Zoned elementary schools serving sections of the Murillo CDP as of the 2010 U.S. Census include Betts, Cano-Conzalez, De Escandon, Esparza, Gorena, Lyndon B. Johnson, Ramirez, and Travis (grades PK-5) Almost all of Murillo CDP as of 2010 is zoned to Barrientes Middle School, with a small segment zoned to South Middle School. All residents are zoned to Edinburg High School (9-12).

Edinburg High School was in Murillo CDP as of the 2010 census, and at the time it was not in the Edinburg city limits. The Edinburg city council voted to annex land, including the plot with Edinburg High, in 2013. As of the 2020 census the school is now in the Edinburg city limits.

In addition, South Texas Independent School District operates magnet schools that serve the community.

All of Hidalgo County is in the service area of South Texas College.
