= Texas State Highway 186 =

State highway in Hidalgo and Willacy counties in Texas, United States

State Highway 186
- SH 186, highlighted in red

Route information
- Maintained by TxDOT
- Length: 47.71 mi (76.78 km)
- Existed: 1932–present

Major junctions
- West end: Future I-69C / US 281 / FM 1017 in Linn
- Bus. US 77 in Raymondville; I-69E / US 77 in Raymondville
- East end: North Shore Drive in Port Mansfield

Location
- Country: United States
- State: Texas
- Counties: Hidalgo, Willacy

Highway system
- Highways in Texas; Interstate; US; State; Former; Toll; Loops; Spurs; FM/RM; Park; Rec
← SH 185	→ SH 187

State Highway 186 (SH 186) is a state highway in the Rio Grande Valley in Hidalgo and Willacy counties in Texas, United States, that connects U.S. Route 281 (US 281), future Interstate 69C (Future I-69C), and Farm to Market Road 1017 (FM 1017) in Linn with the Gulf of Mexico at Port Mansfield.

== Route description ==
SH 186 begins at an intersection with US 281 (future I-69C) and FM 1917 in Linn (a census-designated place formerly known as San Manual-Linn) in Hidalgo County. (US 83 heads north toward Falfurrias and San Antonio and south toward Edinburg. FM 1017 heads west toward San Isidro, La Gloria, and Hebbronville.)

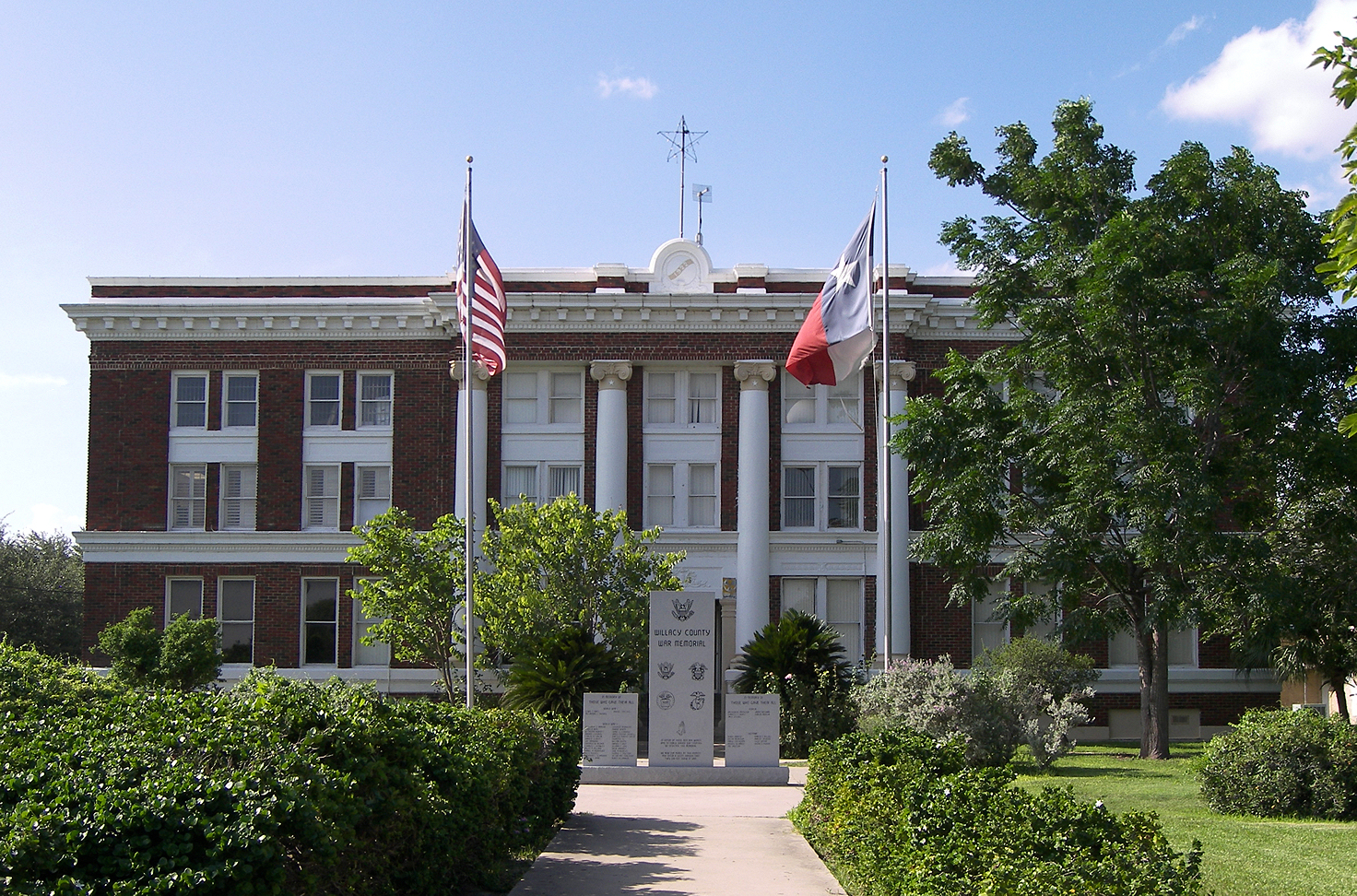
Historic Willacy County Courthouse, located along SH 186 in Raymondville, July 2008

From its western terminus SH 186 travels to the southeast, passing a section of the Lower Rio Grande Valley National Wildlife Refuge, before turning to a more easterly path and crossing into Willacy County. SH 186 runs along Hidalgo Avenue in Raymondville, where it crosses Interstate 69E / U.S. Route 77. Continuing to the east, the highway passes to the south of the city of San Perlita before turning to the northeast and passing through an unincorporated section of the county. In Port Mansfield, SH 186 intersects the short Farm to Market Road 606 near its eastern terminus; the highway continues one block past this point before ending at Laguna Madre.

== History ==
SH 186 was designated on December 8, 1932 along a route from Linn to Raymondville. On July 15, 1935, the west end was shortened to the Willacy County line as that section had not yet been built. On August 1, 1936, this section was restored. On July 25, 1939, it was extended east to San Perlita. On May 31, 1973, the portion of SH 186 from San Perlita southward was transferred to FM 2209. SH 186 was signed, but not designated, along FM 497 instead. SH 186 was extended to its current eastern terminus in Port Mansfield on August 29, 1990, replacing FM 497.

== Major intersections ==
County	Location	mi	km	Destinations	Notes
Hidalgo	Linn	0.00	0.00	FM 1017 west – San Isidro	Continuation west from western terminus
Hidalgo	Linn	0.00	0.00	Future I-69C / US 281 – Falfurrias, Edinburg	Western terminus; US 281 is the future Interstate 69C
Hidalgo				FM 493 south – Hargill	
Willacy				FM 88 south – Monte Alto, Weslaco	
Willacy				FM 1015 south – Lasara, Edcouch	
Willacy				FM 1425 south – Heidelberg	
Willacy				FM 1761 north	
Willacy				FM 1834 south	
Willacy	Raymondville			Bus. US 77 (7th Street)	
Willacy	Raymondville			I-69E / US 77	I-69E exit 48
Willacy				FM 2099 south	
Willacy				FM 2209 north – San Perlita	
Willacy				FM 1420 south – Willamar	
Willacy				FM 3142 west – San Perlita	
Willacy	Port Mansfield			FM 606 north	
Willacy	Port Mansfield	47.71	76.78	North Shore Drive	Eastern terminus
1.000 mi = 1.609 km; 1.000 km = 0.621 mi

== See also ==
- List of state highways in Texas
