= La Coma Heights, Texas =

- Census-designated place
- Location within Texas Location within the United States
- Coordinates: 26°26′27″N 98°4′8″W
- Country: United States
- State: Texas
- County: Hidalgo

Area
  - Total: 0.98 sq mi (2.54 km^{2})
  - Land: 0.98 sq mi (2.54 km^{2})
  - Water: 0 sq mi (0.0 km^{2})
- Elevation: 75 ft (23 m)
- Time zone: UTC-6 (Central (CST))
  - Summer (DST): UTC-5 (CDT)
- ZIP Code: 78542 (Edinburg)
- Area code: 956
- FIPS code: 48-40104
- GNIS feature ID: 2805792

La Coma Heights is an unincorporated community and census-designated place (CDP) in Hidalgo County, Texas, United States. It was first listed as a CDP prior to the 2020 census. As of the 2020 census, La Coma Heights had a population of 116.

It is in the northeastern part of the county, on the south side of Farm to Market Road 490. It is 3 miles (5 km) west of Hargill and 16 miles (26 km) northeast of Edinburg, the county seat.

== Demographics ==
Historical population
Census	Pop.	Note	%±
2020	116		—
U.S. Decennial Census; 1850–1900 1910; 1920 1930 1940; 1950 1960 1970; 1980 1990 2000; 2010 2020

La Coma Heights first appeared as a census designated place in the 2020 U.S. census.

=== 2020 census ===
La Coma Heights CDP, Texas – Racial and ethnic composition Note: the US Census treats Hispanic/Latino as an ethnic category. This table excludes Latinos from the racial categories and assigns them to a separate category. Hispanics/Latinos may be of any race.
Race / Ethnicity (NH = Non-Hispanic)	Pop 2020	% 2020
White alone (NH)	7	6.03%
Black or African American alone (NH)	2	1.72%
Native American or Alaska Native alone (NH)	0	0.00%
Asian alone (NH)	0	0.00%
Native Hawaiian or Pacific Islander alone (NH)	0	0.00%
Other race alone (NH)	1	0.86%
Mixed race or Multiracial (NH)	2	1.72%
Hispanic or Latino (any race)	104	89.66%
Total	116	100.00%

== Education ==
It is in the Edinburg Consolidated Independent School District.

La Coma Heights is zoned to: Hargill Elementary School, Harwell Middle School, and Edinburg North High School.
