= Faysville, Texas =

- Former Census-designated place
- Nickname: The Heart of the Valley
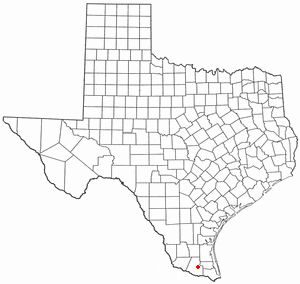
- Location of Faysville, Texas

- Coordinates: 26°24′31″N 98°8′17″W
- Country: United States of America
- State: Texas
- County: Hidalgo

Area
  - Total: 0.93 sq mi (2.4 km^{2})
  - Land: 0.93 sq mi (2.4 km^{2})
  - Water: 0 sq mi (0.0 km^{2})
- Elevation: 85 ft (26 m)

Population (2010)
  - Total: 439
  - Density: 470/sq mi (180/km^{2})
- Time zone: UTC-6 (Central (CST))
  - Summer (DST): UTC-5 (CDT)
- ZIP code: 78539
- Area code: 956
- FIPS code: 48-25656
- GNIS feature ID: 2408205

Faysville is a former census-designated place (CDP) in Hidalgo County, Texas. It was annexed into the city of Edinburg in 2015. The population was 439 at the 2010 United States census. It is part of the McAllen–Edinburg–Mission Metropolitan Statistical Area.

== Geography ==
Faysville is located at 26°24′31″N 98°8′17″W (26.408564, -98.137947).

According to the United States Census Bureau, the CDP has a total area of 0.9 square miles (2.3 km^{2}), all land.

== Demographics ==
Historical population
Census	Pop.	Note	%±
2000	348		—
2010	439		26.1%
U.S. Decennial Census; 1850–1900 1910; 1920 1930 1940; 1950 1960 1970; 1980 1990 2000; 2010

Faysville first appeared as a census designated place in the 2000 U.S. census. It was absorbed by the city of Edinburg prior to the 2020 U.S. census.

=== 2010 census ===
Faysville CDP, Texas – Racial and ethnic composition Note: the US Census treats Hispanic/Latino as an ethnic category. This table excludes Latinos from the racial categories and assigns them to a separate category. Hispanics/Latinos may be of any race.
Race / Ethnicity (NH = Non-Hispanic)	Pop 2000	Pop 2010	% 2000	% 2010
White alone (NH)	3	6	0.86%	1.37%
Black or African American alone (NH)	0	0	0.00%	0.00%
Native American or Alaska Native alone (NH)	0	0	0.00%	0.00%
Asian alone (NH)	0	0	0.00%	0.00%
Pacific Islander alone (NH)	0	0	0.00%	0.00%
Some Other Race alone (NH)	0	0	0.00%	0.00%
Mixed Race or Multi-Racial (NH)	0	0	0.00%	0.00%
Hispanic or Latino (any race)	345	433	99.14%	98.63%
Total	348	439	100.00%	100.00%

=== 2000 census ===
As of the census of 2000, there were 348 people, 95 households, and 81 families residing in the CDP. The population density was 373.2 inhabitants per square mile (144.1/km^{2}). There were 108 housing units at an average density of 115.8 per square mile (44.7/km^{2}). The racial makeup of the CDP was 63.22% White, 35.63% from other races, and 1.15% from two or more races. Hispanic or Latino of any race were 99.14% of the population.

There were 95 households, out of which 49.5% had children under the age of 18 living with them, 68.4% were married couples living together, 14.7% had a female householder with no husband present, and 13.7% were non-families. 13.7% of all households were made up of individuals, and 9.5% had someone living alone who was 65 years of age or older. The average household size was 3.66 and the average family size was 4.01.

In the CDP, the population was spread out, with 33.3% under the age of 18, 12.1% from 18 to 24, 28.2% from 25 to 44, 14.1% from 45 to 64, and 12.4% who were 65 years of age or older. The median age was 27 years. For every 100 females, there were 93.3 males. For every 100 females age 18 and over, there were 96.6 males.

The median income for a household in the CDP was $23,646, and the median income for a family was $24,063. Males had a median income of $23,177 versus $17,778 for females. The per capita income for the CDP was $8,679. About 20.0% of families and 18.9% of the population were below the poverty line, including 16.9% of those under age 18 and 29.6% of those age 65 or over.

== Education ==
The community is served by the Edinburg Consolidated Independent School District (ECISD). Zoned schools include Guerra Elementary School, Brewster K-8 for middle school, and Edinburg North High School (9-12).

In addition, South Texas Independent School District operates magnet schools that serve the community.

All of Hidalgo County is in the service area of South Texas College.
