= ENHS =

ENHS may refer to:

- Edinburg North High School, Edinburg, Texas, United States
- Eisenhower National Historic Site
- Encapsulated Nuclear Heat Source
- East Noble High School, high school in Kendallville, Indiana
