= San Carlos, Texas =

- Census-designated place
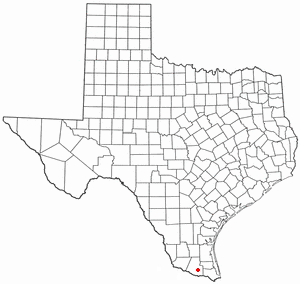
- Location of San Carlos, Texas

- Coordinates: 26°17′49″N 98°4′10″W
- Country: United States of America
- State: Texas
- County: Hidalgo

Area
  - Total: 1.8 sq mi (4.6 km^{2})
  - Land: 1.8 sq mi (4.6 km^{2})
  - Water: 0 sq mi (0.0 km^{2})
- Elevation: 75 ft (23 m)

Population (2020)
  - Total: 3,087
  - Density: 1,700/sq mi (670/km^{2})
- Time zone: UTC-6 (Central (CST))
  - Summer (DST): UTC-5 (CDT)
- ZIP code: 78542
- Area code: 956
- FIPS code: 48-65048
- GNIS feature ID: 1346316

San Carlos is a community and census-designated place (CDP) in Hidalgo County, Texas. The population was 3,087 at the 2020 United States Census. It is part of the McAllen–Edinburg–Mission Metropolitan Statistical Area.

San Carlos is located northeast of McAllen.

== Geography ==
San Carlos is located at 26°17′49″N 98°4′10″W (26.297004, -98.069408).

According to the United States Census Bureau, the CDP has a total area of 1.8 square miles (4.7 km^{2}), all land.

San Carlos is five miles east of Edinburg and US Route 281 on State Highway 107. It is also approximately 12 miles north of the border of Mexico.

== Demographics ==
Historical population
Census	Pop.	Note	%±
2000	2,650		—
2010	3,130		18.1%
2020	3,087		−1.4%
U.S. Decennial Census; 1850–1900 1910; 1920 1930 1940; 1950 1960 1970; 1980 1990 2000; 2010 2020

San Carlos first appeared as a census designated place in the 2000 U.S. census.

=== Racial and ethnic composition ===
San Carlos CDP, Texas – Racial and ethnic composition Note: the US Census treats Hispanic/Latino as an ethnic category. This table excludes Latinos from the racial categories and assigns them to a separate category. Hispanics/Latinos may be of any race.
Race / Ethnicity (NH = Non-Hispanic)	Pop 2000	Pop 2010	Pop 2020	% 2000	% 2010	% 2020
White alone (NH)	69	46	56	2.60%	1.47%	1.81%
Black or African American alone (NH)	1	0	0	0.04%	0.00%	0.00%
Native American or Alaska Native alone (NH)	0	0	1	0.00%	0.00%	0.03%
Asian alone (NH)	0	0	1	0.00%	0.00%	0.03%
Native Hawaiian or Pacific Islander alone (NH)	0	0	0	0.00%	0.00%	0.00%
Other race alone (NH)	0	2	5	0.00%	0.06%	0.16%
Mixed race or Multiracial (NH)	8	0	8	0.30%	0.00%	0.26%
Hispanic or Latino (any race)	2,572	3,082	3,016	97.06%	98.47%	97.70%
Total	2,650	3,130	3,087	100.00%	100.00%	100.00%

=== 2020 census ===
As of the 2020 census, San Carlos had a population of 3,087. The median age was 29.0 years. 31.5% of residents were under the age of 18 and 10.0% of residents were 65 years of age or older. For every 100 females there were 98.4 males, and for every 100 females age 18 and over there were 95.0 males age 18 and over.

95.7% of residents lived in urban areas, while 4.3% lived in rural areas.

There were 832 households in San Carlos, of which 48.2% had children under the age of 18 living in them. Of all households, 49.9% were married-couple households, 16.6% were households with a male householder and no spouse or partner present, and 27.5% were households with a female householder and no spouse or partner present. About 15.1% of all households were made up of individuals and 6.2% had someone living alone who was 65 years of age or older.

There were 892 housing units, of which 6.7% were vacant. The homeowner vacancy rate was 0.9% and the rental vacancy rate was 4.7%.

=== 2000 census ===
As of the census of 2000, there were 2,650 people, 633 households, and 576 families residing in the CDP. The population density was 1,476.5 inhabitants per square mile (570.1/km^{2}). There were 693 housing units at an average density of 386.1 per square mile (149.1/km^{2}). The racial makeup of the CDP was 79.81% White, 0.30% African American, 17.17% from other races, and 2.72% from two or more races. Hispanic or Latino of any race were 97.06% of the population.

There were 633 households, out of which 61.9% had children under the age of 18 living with them, 73.1% were married couples living together, 12.2% had a female householder with no husband present, and 9.0% were non-families. 8.1% of all households were made up of individuals, and 3.2% had someone living alone who was 65 years of age or older. The average household size was 4.19 and the average family size was 4.39.

In the CDP, the population was spread out, with 40.6% under the age of 18, 12.9% from 18 to 24, 29.1% from 25 to 44, 12.1% from 45 to 64, and 5.3% who were 65 years of age or older. The median age was 23 years. For every 100 females, there were 101.2 males. For every 100 females age 18 and over, there were 99.0 males.

The median income for a household in the CDP was $14,524, and the median income for a family was $15,673. Males had a median income of $13,668 versus $13,843 for females. The per capita income for the CDP was $4,296. About 60.0% of families and 64.1% of the population were below the poverty line, including 72.4% of those under age 18 and 56.8% of those age 65 or over.

== Education ==
Educationally, the community is served by the Edinburg Consolidated Independent School District.

Zoned elementary campuses serving sections include San Carlos Elementary School and John F. Kennedy Elementary School (grades PK-5). All areas are zoned to Memorial Middle School, and Edinburg High School (9-12). Previously Harwell Middle School included a portion of San Carlos.

In addition, South Texas Independent School District operates magnet schools that serve the community.

All of Hidalgo County is in the service area of South Texas College.
