= Linn, Texas =

Census-designated place in Hidalgo County, Texas, United States

- Census-designated place
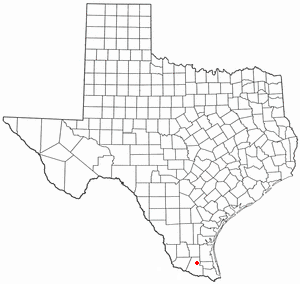
- Location of Linn, Texas

- Coordinates: 26°33′34″N 98°7′18″W
- Country: United States of America
- State: Texas
- County: Hidalgo

Area
  - Total: 48.6 sq mi (125.9 km^{2})
  - Land: 48.6 sq mi (125.8 km^{2})
  - Water: 0.039 sq mi (0.1 km^{2})
- Elevation: 75 ft (23 m)

Population (2020)
  - Total: 733
  - Density: 15.1/sq mi (5.83/km^{2})
- Time zone: UTC-6 (Central (CST))
  - Summer (DST): UTC-5 (CDT)
- ZIP Code: 78563
- Area code: 956
- FIPS code: 48-42916
- GNIS feature ID: 1378589

Linn, formerly San Manuel-Linn, is a census-designated place (CDP) in Hidalgo County, Texas, United States. As of the 2020 census, Linn had a population of 733. The population was 801 at the 2010 census, down from 958 at the 2000 census. It is part of the McAllen–Edinburg–Mission Metropolitan Statistical Area.

== Geography ==
Linn is in northern Hidalgo County at 26°33′52″N 98°7′45″W (26.564558, -98.129217), along U.S. Route 281, State Highway 186, and FM 1017. It is 22 miles (35 km) north of Edinburg, the county seat, 29 miles (47 km) north of Pharr, and 45 miles (72 km) south of Falfurrias, as well as 208 miles (335 km) south of San Antonio, all via US 281. It is also 26 miles (42 km) west of Raymondville via TX 186, and 28 miles (45 km) southeast of San Isidro, and 81 miles (130 km) southeast of Hebbronville via FM 1017.

According to the United States Census Bureau, the Linn CDP has a total area of 48.6 square miles (125.9 km^{2}), of which 48.6 square miles (125.8 km^{2}) are land and 0.04 square miles (0.1 km^{2}), or 0.11%, are water.

== Climate ==
The climate in this area is characterized by hot, humid summers and generally mild to cool winters. According to the Köppen Climate Classification system, San Manuel-Linn has a humid subtropical climate, abbreviated "Cfa" on climate maps.

== Demographics ==
Historical population
Census	Pop.	Note	%±
2000	958		—
2010	801		−16.4%
2020	733		−8.5%
U.S. Decennial Census; 1850–1900 1910; 1920 1930 1940; 1950 1960 1970; 1980 1990 2000; 2010 2020

Linn first appeared as a census designated place as San Manuel-Linn in the 2000 U.S. census. The name was changed to Linn for the 2010 U.S. census.

=== 2020 census ===
Linn CDP, Texas – Racial and ethnic composition Note: the US Census treats Hispanic/Latino as an ethnic category. This table excludes Latinos from the racial categories and assigns them to a separate category. Hispanics/Latinos may be of any race.
Race / Ethnicity (NH = Non-Hispanic)	Pop 2000	Pop 2010	Pop 2020	% 2000	% 2010	% 2020
White alone (NH)	247	70	116	25.78%	8.74%	15.83%
Black or African American alone (NH)	0	0	0	0.00%	0.00%	0.00%
Native American or Alaska Native alone (NH)	0	1	0	0.00%	0.12%	0.00%
Asian alone (NH)	2	0	0	0.21%	0.00%	0.00%
Native Hawaiian or Pacific Islander alone (NH)	0	0	0	0.00%	0.00%	0.00%
Other race alone (NH)	0	0	0	0.00%	0.00%	0.00%
Mixed race or Multiracial (NH)	2	0	3	0.21%	0.00%	0.41%
Hispanic or Latino (any race)	707	730	614	73.80%	91.14%	83.77%
Total	958	801	733	100.00%	100.00%	100.00%

As of the 2020 United States census, there were 733 people, 239 households, and 157 families residing in the CDP.

=== 2000 census ===
As of the census of 2000, there were 958 people, 328 households, and 270 families residing in the CDP. The population density was 19.7 people per square mile (7.6/km^{2}). There were 702 housing units at an average density of 14.4/sq mi (5.6/km^{2}). The racial makeup of the CDP was 81.52% White, 1.04% Native American, 0.21% Asian, 16.28% from other races, and 0.94% from two or more races. Hispanic or Latino of any race were 73.80% of the population.

There were 328 households, out of which 30.8% had children under the age of 18 living with them, 70.4% were married couples living together, 9.8% had a female householder with no husband present, and 17.4% were non-families. 15.9% of all households were made up of individuals, and 10.7% had someone living alone who was 65 years of age or older. The average household size was 2.92 and the average family size was 3.26.

In the CDP, the population was spread out, with 26.9% under the age of 18, 7.9% from 18 to 24, 21.3% from 25 to 44, 21.0% from 45 to 64, and 22.9% who were 65 years of age or older. The median age was 38 years. For every 100 females, there were 90.8 males. For every 100 females age 18 and over, there were 90.7 males.

The median income for a household in the CDP was $26,406, and the median income for a family was $27,596. Males had a median income of $31,111 versus $16,875 for females. The per capita income for the CDP was $11,707. About 19.4% of families and 28.4% of the population were below the poverty line, including 51.3% of those under age 18 and 5.2% of those age 65 or over.

== Education ==
The community is served by the Edinburg Consolidated Independent School District (ECISD). Zoned schools include the Brewster School, which houses Pre-Kindergarten through 8th grade, and Edinburg North High School (9–12).

In addition, South Texas Independent School District operates magnet schools that serve the community.

All of Hidalgo County is in the service area of South Texas College.

== See also ==
- List of census-designated places in Texas
