= Doolittle, Texas =

- Census-designated place
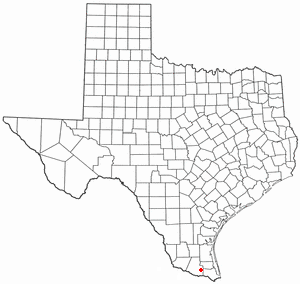
- Location of Doolittle, Texas

- Coordinates: 26°21′52″N 98°7′17″W
- Country: United States of America
- State: Texas
- County: Hidalgo

Area
  - Total: 4.2 sq mi (11.0 km^{2})
  - Land: 4.2 sq mi (11.0 km^{2})
  - Water: 0 sq mi (0.0 km^{2})
- Elevation: 85 ft (26 m)

Population (2020)
  - Total: 4,061
  - Density: 956/sq mi (369/km^{2})
- Time zone: UTC-6 (Central (CST))
  - Summer (DST): UTC-5 (CDT)
- ZIP code: 78542
- Area code: 956
- FIPS code: 48-20926
- GNIS feature ID: 1852699

Doolittle is a census-designated place (CDP) in Hidalgo County, Texas, United States. The population was 4,061 at the 2020 United States Census. It is part of the McAllen–Edinburg–Mission Metropolitan Statistical Area.

== Geography ==
Doolittle is located at 26°21′52″N 98°7′17″W (26.364570, -98.121522).

According to the United States Census Bureau, the CDP has a total area of 4.3 square miles (11 km^{2}), all land.

== Demographics ==
Historical population
Census	Pop.	Note	%±
2000	2,358		—
2010	2,769		17.4%
2020	4,061		46.7%
U.S. Decennial Census; 1850–1900 1910; 1920 1930 1940; 1950 1960 1970; 1980 1990 2000; 2010 2020 Census

Doolittle first appeared as a census designated place in the 2000 U.S. census.

=== Racial and ethnic composition ===
Doolittle CDP, Texas – Racial and ethnic composition Note: the US Census treats Hispanic/Latino as an ethnic category. This table excludes Latinos from the racial categories and assigns them to a separate category. Hispanics/Latinos may be of any race.
Race / Ethnicity (NH = Non-Hispanic)	Pop 2000	Pop 2010	Pop 2020	% 2000	% 2010	% 2020
White alone (NH)	89	50	84	3.77%	1.81%	2.07%
Black or African American alone (NH)	0	1	5	0.00%	0.04%	0.12%
Native American or Alaska Native alone (NH)	0	0	8	0.00%	0.00%	0.20%
Asian alone (NH)	2	1	0	0.08%	0.04%	0.00%
Native Hawaiian or Pacific Islander alone (NH)	0	0	0	0.00%	0.00%	0.00%
Other race alone (NH)	0	0	20	0.00%	0.00%	0.49%
Mixed race or Multiracial (NH)	4	0	2	0.17%	0.00%	0.05%
Hispanic or Latino (any race)	2,263	2,717	3,942	95.97%	98.12%	97.07%
Total	2,358	2,769	4,061	100.00%	100.00%	100.00%

=== 2020 census ===
As of the 2020 census, Doolittle had a population of 4,061. The median age was 26.0 years. 36.1% of residents were under the age of 18 and 7.2% of residents were 65 years of age or older. For every 100 females, there were 101.9 males, and for every 100 females age 18 and over, there were 99.8 males age 18 and over.

91.9% of residents lived in urban areas, while 8.1% lived in rural areas.

There were 1,086 households in Doolittle, of which 50.1% had children under the age of 18 living in them. Of all households, 51.0% were married-couple households, 15.7% were households with a male householder and no spouse or partner present, and 28.1% were households with a female householder and no spouse or partner present. About 14.2% of all households were made up of individuals and 4.7% had someone living alone who was 65 years of age or older.

There were 1,181 housing units, of which 8.0% were vacant. The homeowner vacancy rate was 0.5% and the rental vacancy rate was 13.9%.

=== 2000 census ===
As of the census of 2000, there were 2,358 people, 543 households, and 508 families residing in the CDP. The population density was 554.2 inhabitants per square mile (214.0/km^{2}). There were 599 housing units at an average density of 140.8 per square mile (54.4/km^{2}). The racial makeup of the CDP was 46.48% White, 0.08% African American, 0.25% Native American, 0.08% Asian, 50.81% from other races, and 2.29% from two or more races. Hispanic or Latino of any race were 95.97% of the population.

There were 543 households, out of which 68.5% had children under the age of 18 living with them, 76.1% were married couples living together, 13.3% had a female householder with no husband present, and 6.4% were non-families. 5.0% of all households were made up of individuals, and 2.4% had someone living alone who was 65 years of age or older. The average household size was 4.34 and the average family size was 4.50.

In the CDP, the population was spread out, with 43.3% under the age of 18, 12.0% from 18 to 24, 28.4% from 25 to 44, 13.2% from 45 to 64, and 3.1% who were 65 years of age or older. The median age was 22 years. For every 100 females, there were 97.8 males. For every 100 females age 18 and over, there were 96.2 males.

The median income for a household in the CDP was $23,403, and the median income for a family was $24,792. Males had a median income of $15,469 versus $14,853 for females. The per capita income for the CDP was $6,349. About 35.9% of families and 41.1% of the population were below the poverty line, including 47.6% of those under age 18 and 56.4% of those age 65 or over.

== Education ==
Doolittle is served by the Edinburg Consolidated Independent School District (ECISD).

Zoned elementary campuses serving sections include Crawford, Guerra, Monte Christo, and Villareal (grades PK-5). All residents are zoned to Harwell Middle School (6-8), and Economedes High School (9-12).

In addition, South Texas Independent School District operates magnet schools that serve the community.

All of Hidalgo County is in the service area of South Texas College.
