= Contempo Magazine =

Contempo Magazine is a bi-monthly magazine that features photo-essays in fashion and culture from a South Texas perspective.

== History ==
The magazine is owned by Contempo Magazine, Inc. and was established in January 2008. It features articles about fashion, home improvement, entertainment, technology, computers, health care, personal finance, travel, pets, food and dining, restaurant reviews, and stories relevant to the Rio Grande Valley of Texas. Many of the stories deal with the Reynosa–McAllen metropolitan area along the Mexico–U.S border, influenced by both American and Mexican culture.

William Ralph Magaña is the editor of Contempo Magazine and Tony Magaña is the co-editor and blogger. Magaña also writes for the American Daily Review, and is a member of the National Association of Hispanic Journalists. Other writers have included fashion (Vanessa Valiente and Crystal Felici), computers (Michael Bilyeu), health (Tony Barclay), personal finance (Melissa Magaña), opinions/editorials by Congressmen Henry Cuellar, Rubén Hinojosa and Senator John Cornyn (R-TX).

Contempo Magazine added a weekly internet talk radio program in August 2008 (currently on sabbatical).

OpenCongress, a website project of the Sunlight Foundation and the Participatory Politics Foundation, both of which are non-profit and non-partisan, has listed articles by Contempo Magazine blog as being useful articles for Congressional bills regarding veterans, the Texas border fence, Senator John Cornyn, the economic crisis, and freedom of religion.

The target demographic is affluent Hispanic Baby boomers households of professionals, business owners, and wealthy homeowners ages 30 to 55. Although fashion is a major feature of the magazine, the intended demographic is to catch male readers as well with articles on technology and computers. An active blog discusses local and national issues relevant to McAllen, the Rio Grande Valley, and the nation from a conservative Hispanic point of view.
