= Cathy Baker (actress) =

American actress

- Born: Catherine Graves Baker; January 21, 1947 (age 79); Edinburg, Texas, U.S.
- Other name: "Miss Hee Haw"
- Occupations: Actress; painter
- Years active: 1969–1990
- Known for: Hee Haw emcee

Catherine Graves Baker (born January 21, 1947) is an American actress, best known as a charter member of the cast for the American television country music variety show Hee Haw.

== Life and career ==
Baker was born in Edinburg, Texas. She graduated from Edinburg High School, and from the University of Texas at Austin with a major in radio and TV.

== Hee Haw ==
Baker joined the cast of Hee Haw at its inception in 1969 while working as a painter at the WLAC-TV studios where the show was being filmed in Nashville.

Originally slated to be a regular cast member, Baker became the show's de facto emcee introducing most of the musical segments involving the entire cast, during which she would often be paired with the show's mascot, Beauregard, a lovable, lethargic bloodhound. She was also something of a foil to many of the comedians in the cast, particularly in the "Cornfield" segments of the show. She ended each episode with her signature sign-off: "That’s all!"

Baker was often part of the singing cast, but with the exception of an early performance of a song called "Hey Little Fishie", she did not sing solo. Her personality on the show was that of a sweet and bubbly blonde, quickly earning herself the nickname "Miss Hee Haw", but unlike most of the other women- the "Hee Haw Honeys", who dressed in provocative outfits on-screen, Baker wore either tomboy-style overalls or a modest dress. She became one of Hee Haw's longest-running cast members, remaining with the show until 1990.

== Other appearances ==
- Baker briefly appeared in a non-speaking role as the wife of a Confederate soldier going to war in the 1970 John Wayne television special Swing Out, Sweet Land.
- She appeared in the 1975 film W.W. and the Dixie Dancekings.

== Personal life ==
Baker married lawyer Thomas Purcell and resides in Orange, Virginia handling title insurance transactions for Purcell's law office. They have two adult children.
