= Edinburg Consolidated Independent School District =

School district in Texas, United States

Address
- 411 North 8th Street Edinburg, Texas, 78541; United States

District information
- Grades: PK–12
- Schools: 46
- NCES District ID: 4818180

Students and staff
- Students: 33,810 (2023–2024)
- Teachers: 2,302.12 (on an FTE basis)
- Student–teacher ratio: 14.69:1

Other information
- Website: www.ecisd.us

The Edinburg Consolidated Independent School District (ECISD) is a school district headquartered in the city of Edinburg, Texas, United States, est. 1909.

The district has approximately 4,540 employees, including over 2,600 certified professionals, 900 paraprofessionals, 80 counselors, 40 librarians, 45 nurses, 870 Food Service/Maintenance & Facilities Workers, and 200 bus drivers. The superintendent is Rene Gutierrez. As for students, the peak enrollment for the 2013/2014 school year was 33,412, and the district continues to grow at a rate of approximately 5% annually.

In 2009, the school district was rated "academically acceptable" by the Texas Education Agency.

The school district's police force of 78 sworn police officers, 30 security officers, and three K9 officers includes a SWAT team equipped with military surplus gear acquired under the Department of Defense Excess Property Program.

== Territorial limits ==
The district encompasses 945 square miles (2,450 km^{2}) of land extending north of the city to the end of Hidalgo County.

Almost all of the city of Edinburg is served by ECISD. In addition, small portions of the city of McAllen and several census-designated places in unincorporated Hidalgo County communities are served by ECISD. The unincorporated Hidalgo County communities served by ECISD include:

- Cesar Chavez
- Doolittle
- Harding Gill Tract (part)
- Hargill
- La Blanca (most)
- La Coma Heights
- Linn (formerly San Manuel-Linn)
- Lopezville (partial)
- Murillo (formerly Nurillo)
- San Carlos

It also includes Faysville, which was formerly a CDP, but became a part of Edinburg in 2015.

== Schools ==
The physical campuses of the ECISD include 4 High Schools, 7 Middle Schools, 31 Elementary Schools, and 3 Alternative Campus.

=== High schools ===
- Edinburg High School
- Edinburg North High School
- Johnny G. Economedes High School
- Robert Vela High School

=== Middle schools ===
- B.L. Garza Middle School
- Francisco Barrientes Middle School
- Brewster Middle School
- Harwell Middle School
- Longoria Middle School
- Memorial Middle School
- South Middle School

-Barrientes Middle School is the only school named after a living veteran.

=== Elementary schools ===
- Austin Elementary
  - 2017 National Blue Ribbon School
- Avila Elementary
- Betts Elementary
- Brewster School
- Cano-Gonzalez Elementary
- Canterbury Elementary
- Cavazos Elementary
- Cayetano Elementary
- Crawford Elementary
- De Escandon Elementary
- De la Vina Elementary
- De Zavala Elementary
- Eisenhower Elementary
- Esparza Elementary
- Flores-Zapata Elementary
- Freddy Gonzalez Elementary
- Guerra Elementary
- Hargill Elementary
  - 2018 National Blue Ribbon School
- J.F. Kennedy Elementary
- Thomas Jefferson Elementary
- L.B. Johnson Elementary
- Lee Elementary
- Lincoln Elementary
- Macaria Gorena Elementary
- Magee Elementary
  - 2018 National Blue Ribbon School
- Monte Cristo Elementary
- San Carlos Elementary
- Travis Elementary
- Trevino Elementary
- Truman Elementary
- Villarreal Elementary

=== Alternative schools ===
- Edinburg Alternative Education Academy
- Endeavor Academy
- Vision Academy

== See also ==
- List of school districts in Texas
