= Hidalgo County, Texas =

County in Texas, United States

- County
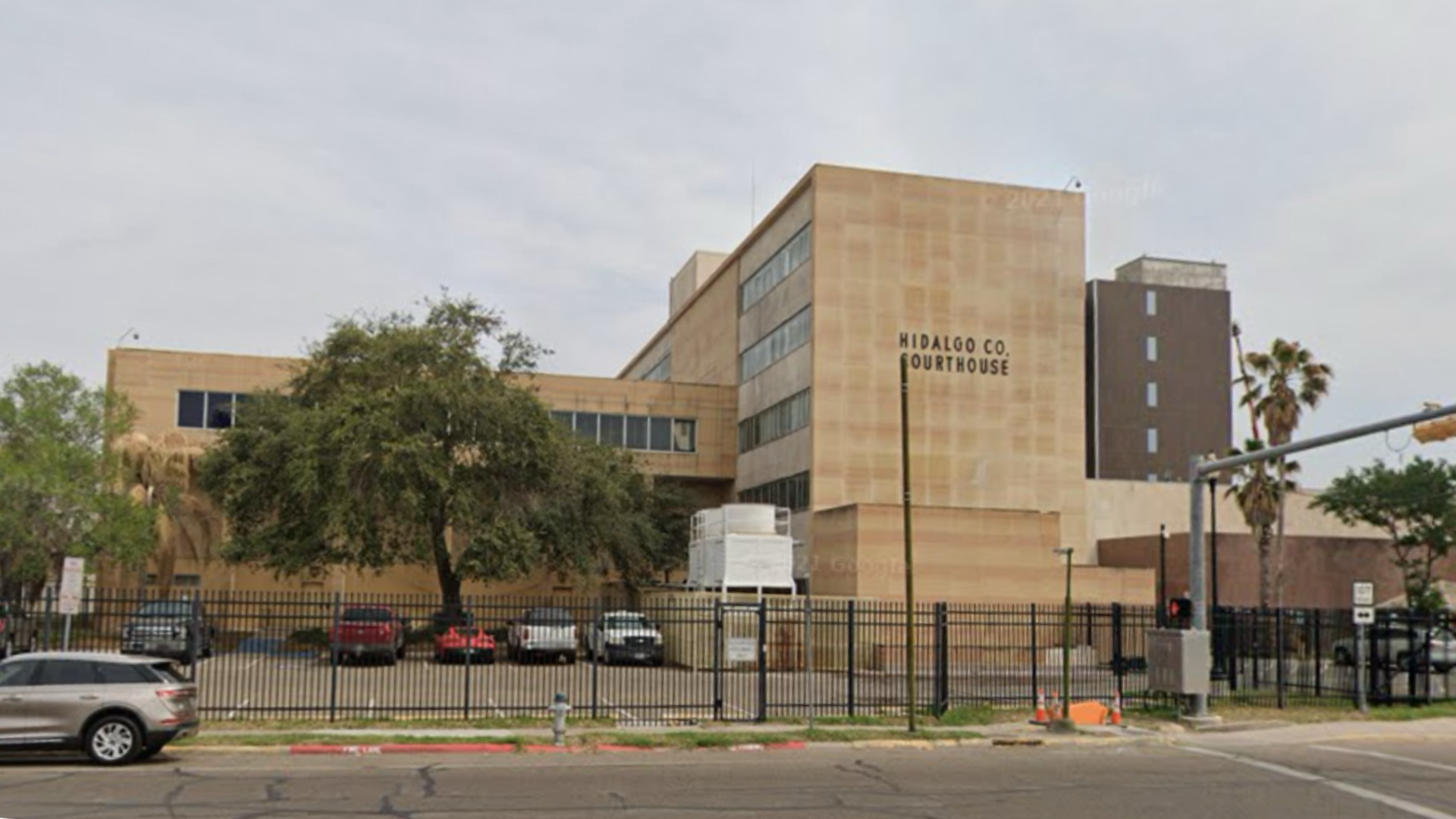
- The Hidalgo County Courthouse at Edinburg in 2024

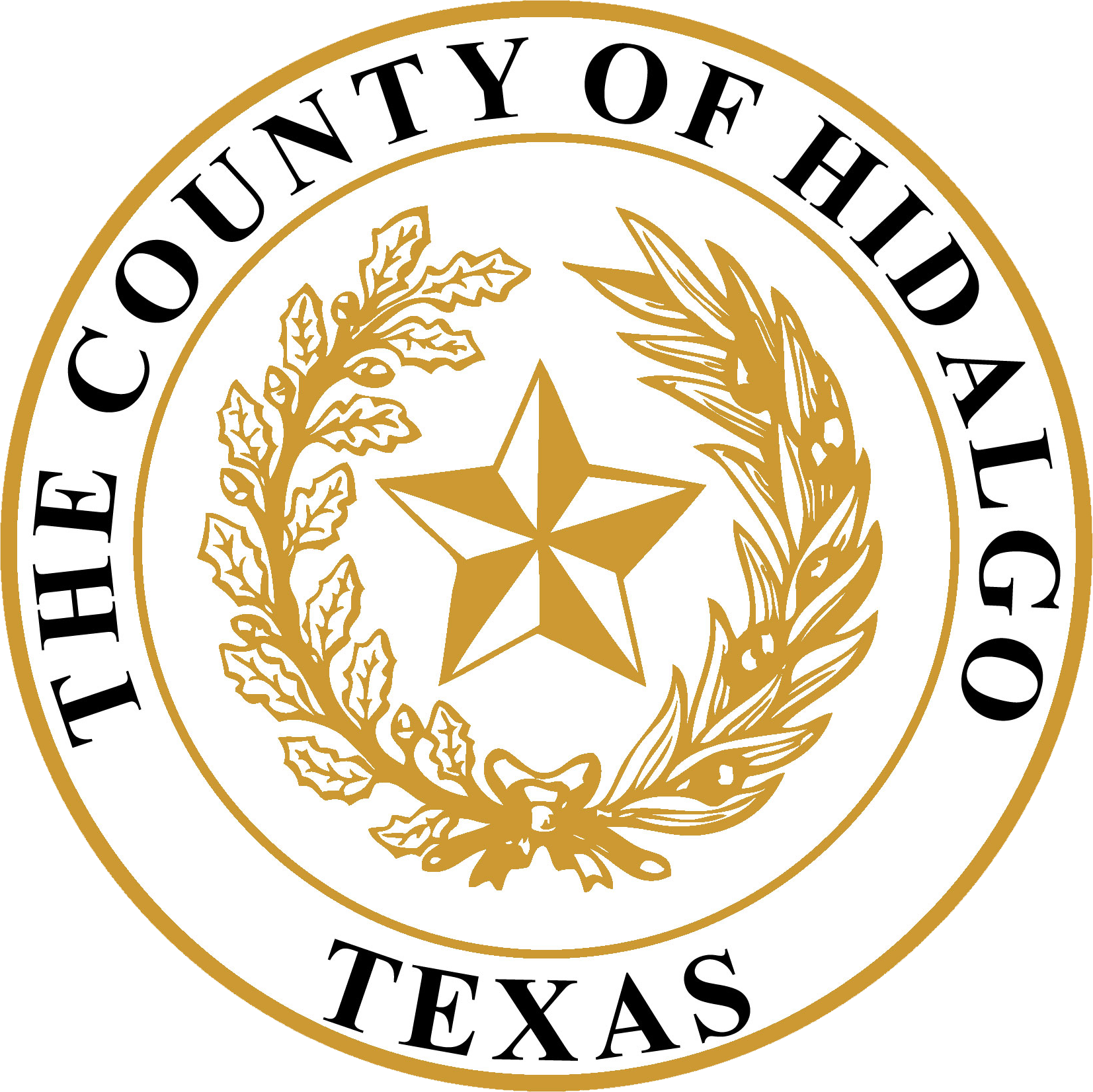
- Flag Seal

- Location within the U.S. state of Texas
- Coordinates: 26°23′48″N 98°10′52″W
- Country: United States
- State: Texas
- Founded: January 24, 1852
- Named for: Miguel Hidalgo y Costilla
- Seat: Edinburg
- Largest city: McAllen

Area
  - Total: 1,583 sq mi (4,100 km^{2})
  - Land: 1,571 sq mi (4,070 km^{2})
  - Water: 12 sq mi (31 km^{2}) 0.81%

Population (2020)
  - Total: 870,781
  - Estimate (2025): 921,549 ▲
  - Density: 554.3/sq mi (214.0/km^{2})

GDP
  - Total: $31.357 billion (2024)
  - Per capita: $34,026 (2024)
- Time zone: UTC−6 (Central)
  - Summer (DST): UTC−5 (CDT)
- Congressional districts: 15th, 34th
- Website: www.hidalgocounty.us

Hidalgo County (hee-DAHL-goh /hɪˈdælɡoʊ/; Spanish pronunciation: [iˈðalɣo]) is a southern county in the U.S. state of Texas. The county seat is Edinburg, and the largest city in the county is McAllen.

As of the 2025 census estimate, its population was 921,549, making it the ninth-most populous county in Texas, and the most populous county outside of the counties in the Texas Triangle. However, based on housing permits and service usage, county officials believe the true population is around 1.2 million, if "a full and accurate census count is completed."

The county is named for Miguel Hidalgo y Costilla, the priest who raised the call for Mexico's independence from Spain. It is located in the Rio Grande Valley of South Texas and is one of the fastest-growing counties in the United States.

Hidalgo County is designated by the U.S. Census Bureau as the McAllen–Edinburg–Mission metropolitan statistical area, which itself is part of the McAllen-Edinburg-Mission-Rio Grande City, Texas combined statistical area with neighboring Starr County.

With a population that is 91.9% Hispanic as of 2020, it is Texas' second-most populous majority-Hispanic county and the fifth-largest nationwide. It is also the largest county which is over 90% Hispanic. It is also the southernmost landlocked county in the United States, and in 2021, it was the largest county in the nation with a total fertility rate above the replacement level (at 2.13).

== Geography ==
According to the United States Census Bureau, the county has a total area of 1,583 sq mi (4,100 km^{2}), of which 12 sq mi (31 km^{2}) (0.8%) are covered by water. The northern part of the county has sandy and light loamy soils over deep reddish or mottled, clayey subsoils. In some areas, limestone lies within 40 in (1 m) of the surface. The southern part of the county has moderately deep to deep loamy surfaces over clayey subsoils. Along the Rio Grande, brown to red clays are found. Hidalgo County is in the South Texas Plains vegetation area, which features grasses, mesquite, live oaks, and chaparral. Native plants, reduced in recent years by extensive farming, include chapote, guayacán, ebony, huisache, brasil, and yucca.

Natural resources included caliche, sand, gravel, oil, and gas. Oil and gas production in 1982 totaled 98,487,211,000 cubic feet (2.7888472×10^{9} m^{3}) of gas-well gas, 139,995 barrels of crude oil, 1,101,666 barrels of condensate, and 15,784,000 cubic feet (447,000 m^{3}) of casinghead gas. The climate is subtropical and humid. Temperatures range from an average low of 47 °F (8 °C) in January to an average high to 96 °F (36 °C) in July; the average annual temperature is 73 °F (23 °C). Rainfall averages 23 inches (580 mm) a year, and the growing season lasts for 320 days of the year.

=== Major highways ===
- I-2
- I-69C
- US 83
- US 281
  - includes western branch called US 281 Spur
- SH 107
- SH 186
- SH 226
- SH 336
- SH 364
- SH 495
- Spur 29
- Spur 31
- Spur 83
- Spur 115
- Spur 241
- Spur 433
- Spur 600

=== Adjacent counties and municipalities ===
- Brooks County (north)
- Kenedy County (northeast)
- Willacy County (east)
- Cameron County (east)
- Starr County (west)
- Gustavo Díaz Ordaz Municipality, Tamaulipas, Mexico (south)
- Reynosa Municipality, Tamaulipas, Mexico (south)
- Río Bravo Municipality, Tamaulipas, Mexico (south)
- Matamoros Municipality, Tamaulipas, Mexico (south)
- Valle Hermoso Municipality, Tamaulipas, Mexico (south)

=== National protected areas ===
- Lower Rio Grande Valley National Wildlife Refuge (part)
- Santa Ana National Wildlife Refuge

== Demographics ==
Historical population
Census	Pop.	Note	%±
1860	1,182		—
1870	2,387		101.9%
1880	4,347		82.1%
1890	6,534		50.3%
1900	6,837		4.6%
1910	13,728		100.8%
1920	38,110		177.6%
1930	77,004		102.1%
1940	106,059		37.7%
1950	160,446		51.3%
1960	180,904		12.8%
1970	181,535		0.3%
1980	283,229		56.0%
1990	383,545		35.4%
2000	569,463		48.5%
2010	774,769		36.1%
2020	870,781		12.4%
2025 (est.)	921,549	▲	5.8%
U.S. Decennial Census; 1850–2010 2010-2020

Hidalgo County, Texas – Racial and ethnic composition Note: the US Census treats Hispanic/Latino as an ethnic category. This table excludes Latinos from the racial categories and assigns them to a separate category. Hispanics/Latinos may be of any race.
Race / Ethnicity (NH = Non-Hispanic)	Pop 1930	Pop 1980	Pop 1990	Pop 2000	Pop 2010	Pop 2020	% 1930	% 1980	% 1990	% 2000	% 2010	% 2020
White alone (NH)	56,168	51,719	54,259	59,423	60,553	53,338	72.94%	18.26%	14.15%	10.43%	7.82%	6.13%
Black or African American alone (NH)	491	422	518	1,934	2,777	3,364	0.64%	0.15%	0.14%	0.34%	0.36%	0.39%
Native American or Alaska Native alone (NH)	x	271	229	428	524	635	x	0.10%	0.06%	0.08%	0.07%	0.07%
Asian alone (NH)	x	419	847	3,207	7,122	8,604	x	0.15%	0.22%	0.56%	0.92%	0.99%
Native Hawaiian or Pacific Islander alone (NH)	x	x	x	37	49	78	x	x	x	0.01%	0.01%	0.01%
Other race alone (NH)	20,345	186	720	171	348	1,915	26.42%	0.07%	0.19%	0.03%	0.04%	0.22%
Mixed race or Multiracial (NH)	x	x	x	1,163	1,190	2,846	x	x	x	0.20%	0.15%	0.33%
Hispanic or Latino (any race)	x	230,212	326,972	503,100	702,206	800,001	x	81.28%	85.25%	88.35%	90.63%	91.87%
Total	77,004	283,229	383,545	569,463	774,769	870,781	100.00%	100.00%	100.00%	100.00%	100.00%	100.00%

=== American Community Survey 2025 data ===
The United States Census Bureau estimated that in 2025, Hidalgo County’s population was 921.549. It was also estimated that the county's population was 5,87% Non-Hispanic White, 92,05% Hispanic or Latino, 0,66% Non-Hispanic Black, 1,01% Asian, 0,08% Native American, 0,02% Pacific Islander, and 0,31% Multiracial.

Total	Population	Percentage
Non-Hispanic White	54.069	5,87%
Hispanic or Latino	848.293	92,05%
Non-Hispanic Black	6.075	0,66%
Asian	9.341	1,01%
Native American	725	0,08%
Pacific Islander	165	0,02%
Non-Hispanic Multiracial	2.881	0,31%

=== 2020 census ===
As of the 2020 census, the county had a population of 870,781. The median age was 31.1 years. 30.2% of residents were under the age of 18 and 11.9% of residents were 65 years of age or older. For every 100 females there were 94.7 males, and for every 100 females age 18 and over there were 91.3 males age 18 and over.

The racial makeup of the county was 34.5% White, 0.5% Black or African American, 0.7% American Indian and Alaska Native, 1.0% Asian, <0.1% Native Hawaiian and Pacific Islander, 22.6% from some other race, and 40.6% from two or more races. Hispanic or Latino residents of any race comprised 91.9% of the population.

91.1% of residents lived in urban areas, while 8.9% lived in rural areas.

There were 258,542 households in the county, of which 46.5% had children under the age of 18 living in them. Of all households, 50.9% were married-couple households, 15.2% were households with a male householder and no spouse or partner present, and 28.4% were households with a female householder and no spouse or partner present. About 16.9% of all households were made up of individuals and 7.1% had someone living alone who was 65 years of age or older.

There were 294,902 housing units, of which 12.3% were vacant. Among occupied housing units, 67.8% were owner-occupied and 32.2% were renter-occupied. The homeowner vacancy rate was 1.2% and the rental vacancy rate was 9.4%.

=== 2010 census ===
As of the census of 2010, there were 774,769 people living in the county. 88.0% were White, 1.0% Asian, 0.6% Black or African American, 0.3% Native American, 8.8% of some other race and 1.3% of two or more races. 90.6% were Hispanic or Latino (of any race).

There were 216,471 households, and 179,668 families living in the county. The population density was 363 people per square mile (140 people/km^{2}). There were 248,287 housing units at an average density of 123 units per square mile (47/km^{2}). There were 216,471 households, out of which 54.2% had children under the age of 18 living with them, 65.00% were married couples living together, 18.8% had a female householder with no husband present, and 17.0% were non-families. 14.0% of all households were made up of individuals, and 5.6% had someone living alone who was 65 years of age or older. The average household size was 3.55 and the average family size was 3.94.

In the county, the population was spread out, with 34.7% under the age of 18, 10.7% from 18 to 24, 27.1% from 25 to 44, 18.2% from 45 to 64, and 9.3% who were 65 years of age or older. The median age was 28.3 years. For every 100 females there were 94.40 males. For every 100 females age 18 and over, there were 89.90 males.

The median income for a household in the county was $30,134, and the median income for a family was $31,760. Males had a median income of $22,635 versus $17,526 for females. The per capita income for the county was $12,130. About 32.60% of families and 35.80% of the population were below the poverty line, including 47.4% of those under age 18 and 29.8% of those age 65 or over. The county's per-capita income makes it one of the poorest counties in the United States. In 2009, it was tied with Bronx County, New York for "the greatest share of people receiving food stamps: 29 percent."

Las Milpas, previously unincorporated, was annexed by Pharr in 1987.

== Government and politics ==
Hidalgo County tends to vote for the Democratic Party, although there is representation of the Republican Party in some of the offices that affect the county. Hidalgo County is represented by Monica De La Cruz of Texas's 15th congressional district and Vicente González of Texas's 34th congressional district. In the 2012 presidential election, 70.4% voted for Barack Obama, while 28.6% voted for Mitt Romney. In the 2020 presidential election, Hidalgo County saw a significant shift to the Republican Party, with Donald Trump increasing the Republican vote from 27.9% in 2016 to 41%. However, as an urban county, the shift was not as large as nearby less densely populated counties. In 2024, on his third run, Trump won the county by 3 points, following a trend that resulted in many Hispanic-majority counties in Texas and Florida flipping red, the first time the county voted for the Republican nominee since 1972.

In the Texas House of Representatives, it is covered by districts 39, 40, and 41.

United States presidential election results for Hidalgo County, Texas
Year	Republican		Democratic		Third party(ies)	
Year	No.	%	No.	%	No.	%
1912	39	2.81%	1,203	86.61%	147	10.58%
1916	260	15.69%	1,364	82.32%	33	1.99%
1920	1,108	31.13%	2,409	67.69%	42	1.18%
1924	996	20.44%	3,662	75.16%	214	4.39%
1928	4,285	51.41%	4,034	48.40%	16	0.19%
1932	2,969	23.22%	9,695	75.84%	120	0.94%
1936	2,962	29.46%	6,782	67.46%	309	3.07%
1940	4,787	38.97%	7,471	60.81%	27	0.22%
1944	4,080	33.35%	7,250	59.26%	904	7.39%
1948	6,220	38.83%	9,526	59.47%	272	1.70%
1952	15,303	62.20%	9,251	37.60%	48	0.20%
1956	13,270	56.89%	9,804	42.03%	253	1.08%
1960	13,628	42.05%	18,663	57.59%	115	0.35%
1964	11,563	34.25%	22,110	65.50%	83	0.25%
1968	14,455	38.95%	20,087	54.13%	2,569	6.92%
1972	22,920	55.23%	18,366	44.26%	213	0.51%
1976	19,199	35.17%	35,021	64.15%	373	0.68%
1980	25,808	41.82%	34,542	55.97%	1,367	2.21%
1984	35,059	44.14%	44,147	55.58%	226	0.28%
1988	29,246	34.87%	54,330	64.78%	294	0.35%
1992	26,976	30.60%	51,205	58.08%	9,979	11.32%
1996	24,437	28.84%	56,335	66.49%	3,955	4.67%
2000	38,301	37.90%	61,390	60.75%	1,359	1.34%
2004	50,931	44.80%	62,369	54.86%	383	0.34%
2008	39,668	30.29%	90,261	68.92%	1,043	0.80%
2012	39,865	28.61%	97,969	70.32%	1,488	1.07%
2016	48,642	27.89%	118,809	68.12%	6,957	3.99%
2020	90,527	40.98%	128,199	58.04%	2,158	0.98%
2024	110,760	50.98%	104,517	48.11%	1,988	0.92%

United States Senate election results for Hidalgo County, Texas1
Year	Republican		Democratic		Third party(ies)	
Year	No.	%	No.	%	No.	%
2024	96,208	45.46%	110,139	52.05%	5,275	2.49%

United States Senate election results for Hidalgo County, Texas2
Year	Republican		Democratic		Third party(ies)	
Year	No.	%	No.	%	No.	%
2020	84,284	40.23%	116,962	55.83%	8,237	3.93%
2026	52,660	26.00%	146,763	72.45%	3,149	1.55%

Texas Gubernatorial election results for Hidalgo County
Year	Republican		Democratic		Third party(ies)	
Year	No.	%	No.	%	No.	%
2022	56,783	40.22%	82,671	58.55%	1,742	1.23%
2026	57,948	28.48%	143,417	70.49%	2,084	1.02%

=== County services ===
The Hidalgo County Sheriff's Office operates jail facilities and is the primary provider of law enforcement services to the county's unincorporated areas.

=== County government ===
Position	Name	Party
County Judge	Richard Cortez	Democratic
Commissioner, Precinct 1	David Fuentes	Democratic
Commissioner, Precinct 2	Eduardo "Eddie" Cantu	Democratic
Commissioner, Precinct 3	Everardo Villareal	Democratic
Commissioner, Precinct 4	Ellie Torres	Democratic
Criminal District Attorney	Toribio "Terry" Palacios	Democratic
District Clerk	Laura Hinojosa	Democratic
County Clerk	Arturo Guajardo, Jr.	Democratic
Sheriff	J.E. "Eddie" Guerra	Democratic
Tax Assessor-Collector	Pablo "Paul" Villarreal	Democratic
Treasurer	Lita Leo	Democratic
Constable, Precinct 1	Celestino Avila, Jr.	Democratic
Constable, Precinct 2	Martin Cantu	Democratic
Constable, Precinct 3	Lazaro Gallardo, Jr.	Democratic
Constable, Precinct 4	Atanacio "J.R." Gaitan	Democratic
Constable, Precinct 5	Danny Marichalar	Democratic

== Education ==
The following school districts serve Hidalgo County:

- Donna Independent School District
- Edcouch-Elsa Independent School District
- Edinburg Consolidated Independent School District
- Hidalgo Independent School District
- La Joya Independent School District
- La Villa Independent School District
- Lyford Consolidated Independent School District (partial)
- McAllen Independent School District
- Mercedes Independent School District
- Mission Consolidated Independent School District
- Monte Alto Independent School District
- Pharr-San Juan-Alamo Independent School District
- Progreso Independent School District
- Sharyland Independent School District
- Valley View Independent School District
- Weslaco Independent School District

In addition, the county is served by the multi-county South Texas Independent School District. The Roman Catholic Diocese of Brownsville operates three PK-8th Grade schools, two lower-level elementary schools and two high schools.

On January 27, 1975, the Alton Independent School District merged into Mission CISD.

The Edinburg campus of the University of Texas Rio Grande Valley (formerly University of Texas-Pan American) is located in Hidalgo County.

All of the county is in the service area of South Texas College. The Pecan, Mid-Valley, Technology, and Nursing & Allied Health campuses of South Texas College are located in Hidalgo County.

== Economy ==
In 2020, the total value of products produced in Hidalgo was $11.5 billion.

In 1982, 91% of the land was in farms and ranches, with 52% of the farmland under cultivation and 85% irrigated; 51 to 60% of the county was considered prime farmland. The primary crops were sorghum, cotton, corn, and vegetables; Hidalgo County led Texas counties in the production of cabbage, onions, cantaloupes, carrots, and watermelons. The primary fruits and nuts grown in the county were grapefruit, oranges, and pecans. Cattle, milk cows, and hogs were the primary livestock products. Hidalgo is the highest-producing county in the state for oilseeds and dry beans.

The Southern Cattle Tick (Rhipicephalus microplus) is invasive here. Populations here have also become highly permethrin resistant. In 2014 the problem had become so severe in Cameron that spread here (and to other neighboring counties) was feared. A Temporary Preventative Quarantine Area was established in Cameron to preserve efficacy in these counties. This was unsuccessful however, due at least in part to the ticks' infestation of wildlife including whitetail (Odocoileus virginianus).

== Media ==
=== Newspapers ===
- The Community Press
- The Valley Town Crier
- The Monitor
- The Mercedes Enterprise
- RGV Business Journal
- The Progress Times
- Texas Border Business
- Mega Doctor News

=== Radio stations ===
- KURV 710 AM
- KRGE 1290 AM
- KYWW 1530 AM
- KCAS 91.5 FM
- KFRQ 94.5 FM
- KBTQ 96.1 FM
- KVMV 96.9 FM
- KGBT 98.5 FM
- KKPS 99.5 FM
- KTEX 100.3 FM
- KNVO 101.1 FM
- KQXX 105.5 FM
- KVLY 107.9 FM

=== Magazine ===
- Contempo Magazine

== Communities ==
=== Cities ===
- Alamo
- Alton
- Donna
- Edcouch
- Edinburg
- Elsa
- Granjeno
- Hidalgo
- La Joya
- La Villa
- McAllen
- Mercedes
- Mission
- Palmhurst
- Palmview
- Peñitas
- Pharr
- Progreso
- Progreso Lakes
- San Juan
- Sullivan City
- Weslaco

=== Census-designated places ===
- Abram
- César Chávez
- Citrus City
- Cuevitas
- Doffing
- Doolittle
- Harding Gill Tract
- Hargill
- Havana
- Heidelberg
- Indian Hills
- La Blanca
- La Coma Heights
- La Homa
- Laguna Seca
- Linn
- Llano Grande
- Lopezville
- Los Ebanos
- Midway North
- Midway South
- Mila Doce
- Monte Alto
- Muniz
- Murillo
- North Alamo
- Olivarez
- Palmview South
- Perezville
- Relampago
- Salida del Sol Estates
- San Carlos
- Scissors
- South Alamo
- Villa Verde
- West Sharyland

=== Former census-designated places ===
- Alton North (annexed to Alton)
- Faysville (annexed to Edinburg in 2015)

=== Unincorporated community ===
- McCook

== See also ==
- List of museums in South Texas
- List of museums in the Texas Gulf Coast
- National Register of Historic Places listings in Hidalgo County, Texas
- Recorded Texas Historic Landmarks in Hidalgo County
