= Salida del Sol Estates, Texas =

- Census-designated place
- Location within Texas Location within the United States
- Coordinates: 26°19′19″N 98°26′46″W ern
- Country: United States
- State: Texas
- County: Hidalgo

Area
  - Total: 2.35 sq mi (6.09 km^{2})
  - Land: 2.35 sq mi (6.09 km^{2})
  - Water: 0 sq mi (0.0 km^{2})
- Elevation: 230 ft (70 m)
- Time zone: UTC-6 (Central (CST))
  - Summer (DST): UTC-5 (CDT)
- ZIP Code: 78576 (Penitas)
- Area code: 956
- FIPS code: 48-64307
- GNIS feature ID: 2805793

Salida del Sol Estates is a colonia and census-designated place (CDP) in Hidalgo County, Texas, United States. It was first listed as a CDP in the 2020 census, at which time it had a population of 6,496.

It is situated in the southwestern part of the county, 6 miles (10 km) north of U.S. Route 83 in Penitas and 18 miles (29 km) west of Edinburg, the county seat.

== Demographics ==
Historical population
Census	Pop.	Note	%±
2020	6,496		—
U.S. Decennial Census; 1850–1900 1910; 1920 1930 1940; 1950 1960 1970; 1980 1990 2000; 2010 2020

Salida del Sol Estates first appeared as a census designated place in the 2020 U.S. census.

=== 2020 census ===
Salida del Sol Estates CDP, Texas – Racial and ethnic composition Note: the US Census treats Hispanic/Latino as an ethnic category. This table excludes Latinos from the racial categories and assigns them to a separate category. Hispanics/Latinos may be of any race.
Race / Ethnicity (NH = Non-Hispanic)	Pop 2020	% 2020
White alone (NH)	55	0.85%
Black or African American alone (NH)	2	0.03%
Native American or Alaska Native alone (NH)	1	0.02%
Asian alone (NH)	1	0.02%
Pacific Islander alone (NH)	0	0.00%
Other race alone (NH)	5	0.08%
Mixed race or Multiracial (NH)	7	0.11%
Hispanic or Latino (any race)	6,425	98.91%
Total	6,496	100.00%
