= César Chávez, Texas =

- Census-designated place
- Coordinates: 26°18′10″N 98°6′34″W
- Country: United States of America
- State: Texas
- County: Hidalgo

Area
  - Total: 3.2 sq mi (8.3 km^{2})
  - Land: 3.2 sq mi (8.3 km^{2})
  - Water: 0 sq mi (0.0 km^{2})
- Elevation: 85 ft (26 m)

Population (2020)
  - Total: 1,608
  - Density: 500/sq mi (190/km^{2})
- Time zone: UTC-6 (Central (CST))
  - Summer (DST): UTC-5 (CDT)
- FIPS code: 48-14038
- GNIS feature ID: 1852692

César Chávez is a census-designated place (CDP) in Hidalgo County, Texas, United States. As of the 2020 census, César Chávez had a population of 1,608. It is part of the McAllen–Edinburg–Mission Metropolitan Statistical Area.

== History ==
The CDP's size decreased between the 2010 U.S. census and the 2020 U.S. census.

== Geography ==
César Chávez is located at 26°18′10″N 98°06′34″W (26.302748, -98.109332).

According to the United States Census Bureau, the CDP has a total area of 3.2 square miles (8.3 km^{2}), all land.

== Demographics ==
Historical population
Census	Pop.	Note	%±
2000	1,469		—
2010	1,929		31.3%
2020	1,608		−16.6%
U.S. Decennial Census; 1850–1900 1910; 1920 1930 1940; 1950 1960 1970; 1980 1990 2000; 2010 2020

César Chávez first appeared as a census designated place in the 2000 U.S. census.

=== 2020 census ===
César Chávez CDP, Texas – Racial and ethnic composition Note: the US Census treats Hispanic/Latino as an ethnic category. This table excludes Latinos from the racial categories and assigns them to a separate category. Hispanics/Latinos may be of any race.
Race / Ethnicity (NH = Non-Hispanic)	Pop 2000	Pop 2010	Pop 2020	% 2000	% 2010	% 2020
White alone (NH)	266	110	122	18.11%	5.70%	7.59%
Black or African American alone (NH)	0	5	2	0.00%	0.26%	0.12%
Native American or Alaska Native alone (NH)	1	1	0	0.07%	0.05%	0.00%
Asian alone (NH)	0	0	3	0.00%	0.00%	0.19%
Native Hawaiian or Pacific Islander alone (NH)	0	0	1	0.00%	0.00%	0.06%
Other race alone (NH)	2	1	4	0.14%	0.05%	0.25%
Mixed race or Multiracial (NH)	2	0	6	0.14%	0.00%	0.37%
Hispanic or Latino (any race)	1,198	1,812	1,470	81.55%	93.93%	91.42%
Total	1,469	1,929	1,608	100.00%	100.00%	100.00%

As of the census of 2000, there were 1,469 people, 445 households, and 372 families residing in the CDP. The population density was 457.6 inhabitants per square mile (176.7/km^{2}). There were 793 housing units at an average density of 247.0 per square mile (95.4/km^{2}). The racial makeup of the CDP was 77.67% White, 0.07% Native American, 20.15% from other races, and 2.11% from two or more races. Hispanic or Latino of any race were 81.55% of the population.

There were 445 households, out of which 41.3% had children under the age of 18 living with them, 66.5% were married couples living together, 12.8% had a female householder with no husband present, and 16.4% were non-families. 14.4% of all households were made up of individuals, and 9.9% had someone living alone who was 65 years of age or older. The average household size was 3.30 and the average family size was about 3.654.

In the CDP, the population was spread out, with 33.2% under the age of 18, 9.1% from 18 to 24, 23.6% from 25 to 44, 16.3% from 45 to 64, and 17.9% who were 65 years of age or older. The median age was 32 years. For every 100 females, there were 91.8 males. For every 100 females age 18 and over, there were 87.8 males.

The median income for a household in the CDP was $20,491, and the median income for a family was $23,088. Males had a median income of $19,063 versus $25,789 for females. The per capita income for the CDP was $9,432. About 26.9% of families and 31.5% of the population were below the poverty line, including 56.8% of those under age 18 and 10.2% of those age 65 or over.

== Education ==
César Chávez is served by the Edinburg Consolidated Independent School District.

Most of the CDP is zoned to Eisenhower Elementary School, while some of it is zoned to Lincoln Elementary School. All residents are zoned to Memorial Middle School, and Economedes High School.

In previous eras, the CDP had a different shape. Former zoned elementary campuses serving sections included Gorena and Lyndon B. Johnson.

In addition, South Texas Independent School District operates magnet schools that serve the community.

All of Hidalgo County is in the service area of South Texas College.
