= Robert Vela High School =

Robert R Vela High School

Location
- 801 East Canton Road; Edinburg, Texas 78539; United States; 26.275879°N 98.159838°W

Information
- Former name: Edinburg High School
- Type: Public high school
- Established: 2012
- School district: Edinburg Consolidated Independent School District
- Principal: Michele Peña
- Teaching staff: 155.32 (FTE)
- Grades: 9-12
- Enrollment: 2,192 (2023-2024)
- Student to teacher ratio: 14.11
- Color
- Team name: Saber Cat
- Website: vela.ecisd.us

Robert Vela High School (RVHS) is a public high school in the district of Edinburg, Texas, United States. It is named after a former coach from Edinburg High, the late Roberto Vela. The school was established in 2012 and is located on Canton Road in Edinburg. Their mascot is the Mighty SaberCat with the colors of blue, black, and silver. It was formerly Edinburg High School, home to The Bobcats before it changed and became Robert Vela High School.

In addition to sections of Edinburg, a small portion of Lopezville is zoned to this school.
