= Jack Bloomfield (baseball) =

American baseball player and coach (1930–2025)

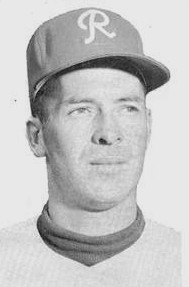
- First baseman / Second baseman
- Born: August 7, 1930; Monte Alto, Texas, U.S.
- Died: July 28, 2025 (aged 94)
- Batted: Left Threw: Right

NPB debut
- July 3, 1960, for the Kintetsu Buffaloes

Last NPB appearance
- 1966, for the Nankai Hawks

NPB statistics
- Batting average: .315
- Home runs: 61
- Runs batted in: 323
- Stats at Baseball Reference

Teams
- As player: Kintetsu Buffalo / Kintetsu Buffaloes (1960–1964); Nankai Hawks (1965–1966); As coach: San Diego Padres (1974); Chicago Cubs (1975–1978)

Gordon Leigh "Jack" Bloomfield (August 7, 1930 – July 28, 2025) was an American infielder, scout and coach in professional baseball. Bloomfield attended the University of Texas–Pan American (then Edinburg College), batted left-handed, threw right-handed, and stood 6 feet 2 inches (1.88 m) tall and weighed 185 pounds (84 kg).

== Biography ==
=== Professional baseball ===
Bloomfield was a second baseman, shortstop and third baseman in his playing days. He signed with the Kansas City Athletics in 1955. His first professional experience came with the Harlingen Capitals of the Class B Big State League, where he batted .310. Bloomfield was then drafted by the Milwaukee Braves and played the bulk of his six-year U.S. professional career in the Braves' and Cincinnati Reds' organizations, once again breaking the .300 mark with the 1958 Seattle Rainiers of the Pacific Coast League. Ironically, his final stint as a minor league player came with the Athletics, playing for their Triple-A Portland Beavers affiliate from July 15, 1959, through May 27, 1960.

He then played professional baseball in Japan during the 1960s (for the Kintetsu Buffaloes and the Nankai Hawks), where he compiled a .315 batting average and a .472 slugging percentage in more than 2400 at-bats. He led the Pacific League in batting twice, with averages of .374 in 1962, and .335 in 1963. Bloomfield was also infamous for an incident in 1961 when the Buffaloes were visiting the Hankyu Braves at Hankyu Nishinomiya Stadium. During the game, a Braves fan leaned into the dugout and yelled "Yankee go home!" at Bloomfield, who proceeded to go into the stands to punch said fan. He was fined ¥50,000 and was suspended for 7 days. To date, this remains one of the only incidents involving a player punching a fan in NPB.

=== Major League coach ===
Bloomfield returned to the U.S. in 1967, becoming a scout for the San Diego Padres in their first season, 1969. After five years in that role, Bloomfield became a coach under Padre manager John McNamara in 1974, then switched to the Chicago Cubs, coaching for them from 1975 through 1978.

Bloomfield later scouted for the New York Yankees, Houston Astros, Pittsburgh Pirates, Colorado Rockies and Montreal Expos.

== Personal life and death ==
In 1993, Bloomfield was inducted into the Rio Grande Valley Sports Hall of Fame. In 2008, he was inducted into the Texas Scouts Association Hall of Fame. In 2012, Bloomfield was awarded the Professional Baseball Scouts Foundation's Legends of Scouting Award.

Bloomfield died on July 28, 2025, at the age of 94.
