= Participatory Politics Foundation =

United States non-profit organization

- Abbreviation: PPF
- Formation: Tax-exempt since June 2009; 17 years ago
- Type: 501(c)(3)
- Headquarters: Brooklyn
- Website: participatorypolitics.org

The Participatory Politics Foundation (PPF) is a United States non-profit organization whose mission is to preserve U.S. democracy. It works to increase public participation by, among other means, modernizing the political system through technological advancements that help connect lawmakers and citizens. The non-profit opened in February 2007.

The foundation has created free, open-source websites such as OpenCongress.org, GovTrack, Councilmatic, and Askthem.io. These civic platforms are made specifically for public use to increase online activism.

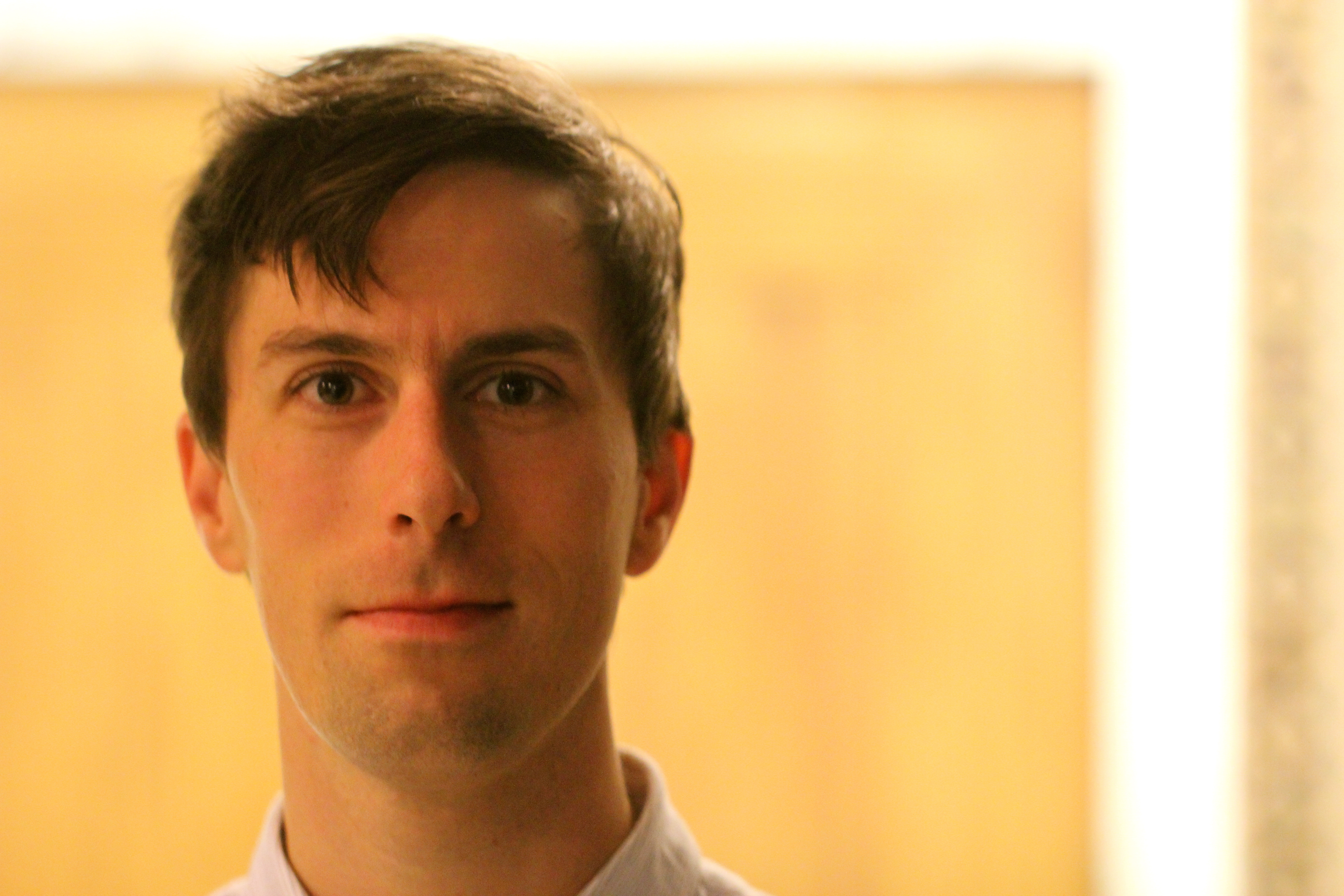
David Moore, former executive director of Participatory Politics Foundation

== Mission statement ==
The mission of PPF is that the U.S. keeps a fully representative democracy. To accomplish this, they state four points that speak for the foundation and its objectives.

1: A fully open government data.

2: Civic engagement initiatives for broad-based public participation.

3: Collaboration with outside partners in government innovation.

4: Advocating for full public financing of elections and comprehensive electoral reforms.

== David Moore ==
David Moore was the executive director of both the Participatory Politics Foundation and their sister organization, Participatory Culture Foundation from 2007 to 2017. He also served as the program manager for OpenCongress.org from 2007, until its closing in 2016. After working as an executive director at PPF, Moore stepped down from the position and co-founded Sludge in 2018.

== Sludge (news) ==
Founded in 2018, Sludge describes itself as an independent, nonprofit news outlet that produces investigative journalism on lobbying and money in politics. As the current project for the Participatory Politics Foundation, it touted a number of successes during its first year. The two-person newsroom became a member of the Institute for Nonprofit News (INN) in 2020.

== Past projects and partnerships ==
=== Sunlight Foundation ===
The Sunlight Foundation, a funder and partner of PPF, ran from 2006-2020 with the main goal using the internet and technology to connect citizens of the US to Congress and the federal government. The foundation was a government transparency advocacy group pushing for policies that optimize civic engagement. This foundation was heavily funded through donations, which enabled it to collaborate with PPF to create OpenCongress.org. PPF was given a $737,300 donation by the Sunlight Foundation.

A criticism the foundation has faced was its claim of being a non-partisan. The organization has been viewed as left leaning due to its original director, Zephyr Teachout, becoming a Democratic politician. Additionally, the companies primary funder, Bloomberg Philanthropies, is known for its left-of-center political views.

=== OpenCongress.org ===
OpenCongress.org was a non-profit, non-partisan public resource where citizens interaction with the government was completed through the companies webpage. It was released in 2007 and founded by both the Participatory Politics Foundation and the Sunlight Foundation. Users could contact members of Congress via the internet by sending an email to congressional members through a page on the website, and were able to gain access to both real-time news and government data. After, the users could share it with the OpenCongress.org community and their social media pages to interact with the public.

Across a span of eight years, the website had 29 million visits and 70 million page visits in addition to its 200,000 registered users. In March 2016, OpenCongress officially closed its doors and merged into a new website called GovTrack. OpenCongress no longer has an up and running website.

=== AskThem.io ===
AskThem.io was another later project developed by PPF and launched in February 2014. It was a "free, open-source, non-profit, non-partisan platform where the public could interact with public figures". The website had a question-and-answer page where users could have their questions answered by. These people included members of government and candidates in every state and congressional district, along with any verified Twitter account. AskThem has access to over "142,000 elected officials, including all 100 state governors, 432 state representatives and over 1,400 state legislatures nationwide".

AskThem worked as follows:

- "Anyone can ask a question to any elected official or verified Twitter account."
- "People sign-on to questions they support, voting them up and circulating them like online petitions."
- "When a question reaches a pre-set threshold, AskThem delivers it to the recipient and encourages a public response."

In June 2018, David Moore posted on the Participatory Politics Foundation blog that AskThem.io's website would be disabled until further notice. Moore asked for volunteers to redesign the website with the intent increase "public accountability."

=== Councilmatic (2015-2017) ===
Created by both the Participatory Politics Foundation and a civic tech company DataMade, Councilmatic is a website that provides its users up to date with information about their city council. Currently, Councilmatic is relaying government information from New York City, Los Angeles, Chicago, and Philadelphia. It is an open-data community resource that can publish data from city-legislations, elected officials, committees and more. The organization says the program works with PFF to close the feedback loop with local elected officials.

=== GovTrack ===
Created in 2004 and eventually taking over OpenCongress.org, GovTrack was yet another non-partisan website for the public to obtain legislative information that encouraged engagement with the government. To aid participation in government, GovTrack pursues new developments on issues that its users find important, and publishes them for the public to use. This is all free, so the information can be viewed or shared by anyone with internet access. Additionally, the company tracks bills and collects information on Congressional members. To ensure the company is non-partisan, they do not accept grants from partisan organizations, and have "no financers, sponsors, investors or partners with a political party or government agency".

Comparable sites to OpenCongress and GovTrack are OpenGovernment.org, AskThem.io, and Councilmatic, which all have the same goal of connecting local residents to state-level officials to express their opinions.
