= Monte Alto, Texas =

- Census-designated place
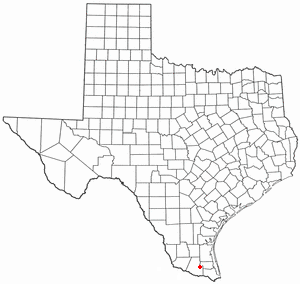
- Location of Monte Alto, Texas

- Coordinates: 26°22′25″N 97°58′21″W
- Country: United States of America
- State: Texas
- County: Hidalgo

Area
  - Total: 2.2 sq mi (5.8 km^{2})
  - Land: 2.2 sq mi (5.8 km^{2})
  - Water: 0 sq mi (0.0 km^{2})
- Elevation: 52 ft (16 m)

Population (2020)
  - Total: 1,930
  - Density: 860/sq mi (330/km^{2})
- Time zone: UTC-6 (Central (CST))
  - Summer (DST): UTC-5 (CDT)
- ZIP code: 78538
- Area code: 956
- FIPS code: 48-49080
- GNIS feature ID: 1341816

Monte Alto is a census-designated place (CDP) in Hidalgo County, Texas, United States. The population was 1,930 at the 2020 census. It is part of the McAllen–Edinburg–Mission Metropolitan Statistical Area.

== Geography ==
Monte Alto is located at 26°22′25″N 97°58′21″W (26.373686, -97.972377).

According to the United States Census Bureau, the CDP has a total area of 2.2 square miles (5.7 km^{2}), all land.

== Demographics ==
Historical population
| Census | Pop. | Note | %± |
|---|---|---|---|
| 1980 | 1,319 | | — |
| 2000 | 1,611 | | — |
| 2010 | 1,924 | | 19.4% |
| 2020 | 1,930 | | 0.3% |
U.S. Decennial Census; 1850–1900 1910; 1920 1930 1940; 1950 1960 1970; 1980 1990 2000; 2010 2020

Monte Alto first appeared as a census designated place in the 1980 United States census but did not appear in the 1990 U.S. census. It reappeared as a CDP in the 2000 U.S. census.

=== 2020 census ===
Monte Alto CDP, Texas – Racial and ethnic composition Note: the US Census treats Hispanic/Latino as an ethnic category. This table excludes Latinos from the racial categories and assigns them to a separate category. Hispanics/Latinos may be of any race.
| Race / Ethnicity (NH = Non-Hispanic) | Pop 2000 | Pop 2010 | Pop 2020 | % 2000 | % 2010 | % 2020 |
|---|---|---|---|---|---|---|
| White alone (NH) | 47 | 92 | 28 | 2.92% | 4.78% | 1.45% |
| Black or African American alone (NH) | 0 | 0 | 3 | 0.00% | 0.00% | 0.16% |
| Native American or Alaska Native alone (NH) | 0 | 0 | 0 | 0.00% | 0.00% | 0.00% |
| Asian alone (NH) | 1 | 0 | 4 | 0.06% | 0.00% | 0.21% |
| Native Hawaiian or Pacific Islander alone (NH) | 0 | 0 | 0 | 0.00% | 0.00% | 0.00% |
| Other race alone (NH) | 0 | 7 | 4 | 0.00% | 0.36% | 0.21% |
| Mixed race or Multiracial (NH) | 4 | 3 | 11 | 0.25% | 0.16% | 0.57% |
| Hispanic or Latino (any race) | 1,559 | 1,822 | 1,880 | 96.77% | 94.70% | 97.41% |
| Total | 1,611 | 1,924 | 1,930 | 100.00% | 100.00% | 100.00% |

As of the census of 2000, there were 1,611 people, 419 households, and 367 families residing in the CDP. The population density was 718.3 inhabitants per square mile (277.3/km^{2}). There were 470 housing units at an average density of 209.6 per square mile (80.9/km^{2}). The racial makeup of the CDP was 66.29% White, 0.50% Native American, 0.06% Asian, 31.47% from other races, and 1.68% from two or more races. Hispanic or Latino of any race were 96.77% of the population.

There were 419 households, out of which 50.4% had children under the age of 18 living with them, 66.8% were married couples living together, 14.3% had a female householder with no husband present, and 12.2% were non-families. 8.8% of all households were made up of individuals, and 3.1% had someone living alone who was 65 years of age or older. The average household size was 3.84 and the average family size was 4.12.

In the CDP, the population was spread out, with 36.4% under the age of 18, 12.2% from 18 to 24, 27.0% from 25 to 44, 17.2% from 45 to 64, and 7.1% who were 65 years of age or older. The median age was 26 years. For every 100 females, there were 93.4 males. For every 100 females age 18 and over, there were 101.6 males.

The median income for a household in the CDP was $20,313, and the median income for a family was $21,389. Males had a median income of $14,625 versus $15,750 for females. The per capita income for the CDP was $6,747. About 39.5% of families and 41.3% of the population were below the poverty line, including 48.7% of those under age 18 and 52.8% of those age 65 or over.

== Education ==
Monte Alto is served by the Monte Alto Independent School District for grades Kindergarten through 8th. Monte Alto High School Independent School District also serves the town for grades 9-12.

In addition, South Texas Independent School District operates magnet schools that serve the community.

== Notable person ==
- Jack Bloomfield, professional baseball player, scout, and coach
