= Monte Alto Independent School District =

School district in Texas, United States

Coordinates: 26.3738°N 97.9769°W

Address
- 25149 1st Street Monte Alto, TX, 78538; United States

District information
- Grades: PK–12
- Schools: 3
- NCES District ID: 4831230

Students and staff
- Students: 820 (2023–2024)
- Teachers: 61.06 (on an FTE basis)
- Student–teacher ratio: 13.43:1

Other information
- Website: www.montealtoisd.org

Monte Alto Independent School District is a public school district based in the community of Monte Alto, Texas (USA). The district has three campuses - Monte Alto Early College High School (Grades 9-12), Monte Alto Middle School (Grades 6-8) and Monte Alto Elementary School (Grades PK-5).

In addition to Monte Alto, it includes part of the Harding Gill Tract.

As of 2007, the Texas State Energy Conservation Office awards Monte Alto ISD money due to the colonias served by the district.

In 2009, the school district was rated "recognized" by the Texas Education Agency.
