= Johnny G. Economedes High School =

Location
- 1414 N. Alamo Road; Edinburg, Texas 78541; United States
- Coordinates: 26.30928°N 98.1026°W

Information
- School type: Public high school
- Established: 2000
- School district: Edinburg Consolidated Independent School District
- Principal: Eva Leon
- Faculty: 176.36 (FTE)
- Grades: 09-12
- Enrollment: 2,672 (2018-19)
- Student to teacher ratio: 15.15
- Campus type: Suburban
- Colors: Navy and orange
- Mascot: Jaguar
- Website: economedes.ecisd.us

Johnny G. Economedes High School (JGHS), also known as Economedes or JEHS, is a public school in unincorporated Hidalgo County, Texas, USA, east of Edinburg. It is part of the Edinburg Consolidated Independent School District and is one of the district's four high schools. The school is named for former Edinburg Fire Chief Johnny G. "the Greek" Economedes.

Economedes serves sections of eastern and northeastern Edinburg along with several census-designated places: Cesar Chavez, Doolittle, and La Blanca.

Expansion to all district high schools in 2010 brought a new performing arts center to JEHS. It is simply called the Performing Arts Center, or PAC.

== Education ==
The school is currently a TEA-Recognized campus because of its high STAAR scores. It is a second time finalist of the College Board Inspirational Award and an AVID National Demonstrated School.
