= Hargill, Texas =

Census-designated place in Texas, US

Hargill is a census-designated place (CDP) in Hidalgo County, Texas, United States. As of the 2020 census, Hargill had a population of 800.

Hargill is part of the McAllen–Edinburg–Mission Metropolitan Statistical Area.

== Geography ==
Hargill is located at 26°26′33″N 98°00′50″W (26.4425672, -98.0138932). It is situated at the junction of Farm Roads 490 and 493 in Hidalgo County, approximately 24 miles (39 km) northeast of McAllen.

== History ==
The community's history dates back to the early 1900s. At that time, the Missouri Texas Land and Irrigation Company owned approximately 60,000 acres (240 km^{2}) of land, including the area that would later become Hargill. Two businessmen, William Apsey Harding and Samuel Lamar Gill, formed a partnership known as the Harding-Gill Company in 1916 for the purpose of developing the land. The name Hargill originated from the last names of the two men. In 1920, school was constructed in the community. A post office opened in 1924 and a railroad station was established in 1926. By 1930, Hargill had an estimated population of 400 with several stores and three churches. The number of residents grew to 450 by the late 1940s. Hargill's population declined to approximately 100 in the mid-1960s, but steadily grew during the remainder of the twentieth century. In 1990, the population exceeded 1,300 and remained at that level in 2000.

== Demographics ==
Historical population
Census	Pop.	Note	%±
2010	877		—
2020	800		−8.8%
U.S. Decennial Census; 1850–1900 1910; 1920 1930 1940; 1950 1960 1970; 1980 1990 2000; 2010 2020

Hargill first appeared as a census designated place in the 2010 U.S. census.

Hargill CDP, Texas – Racial and ethnic composition Note: the US Census treats Hispanic/Latino as an ethnic category. This table excludes Latinos from the racial categories and assigns them to a separate category. Hispanics/Latinos may be of any race.
Race / Ethnicity (NH = Non-Hispanic)	Pop 2010	Pop 2020	% 2010	% 2020
White alone (NH)	72	29	8.21%	3.63%
Black or African American alone (NH)	0	0	0.00%	0.00%
Native American or Alaska Native alone (NH)	0	1	0.00%	0.13%
Asian alone (NH)	0	0	0.00%	0.00%
Native Hawaiian or Pacific Islander alone (NH)	0	0	0.00%	0.00%
Other race alone (NH)	0	1	0.00%	0.13%
Mixed race or Multiracial (NH)	0	0	0.00%	0.00%
Hispanic or Latino (any race)	805	769	91.79%	96.13%
Total	877	800	100.00%	100.00%

== Government and infrastructure ==
The United States Postal Service operates the Hargill Post Office. Hargill's zip code is 78549.

== Education ==
Public education in the community of Hargill is provided by the Edinburg Consolidated Independent School District (ECISD). Zoned campuses include Hargill Elementary School (grades PK-5; located in Hargill), Brewster K-8 School (for middle school), and Edinburg North High School (9–12).

South Texas Independent School District operates area magnet schools.

All of Hidalgo County is in the service area of South Texas College.

== Notable person ==
- Gloria E. Anzaldúa – Writer/poet
