= Edinburg North High School =

Location
- 3101 N. Closner Blvd; Edinburg, Texas 78541; United States
- Coordinates: 26.3325°N 98.1582°W

Information
- School type: Public high school
- Established: 1991
- School district: Edinburg Consolidated Independent School District
- Principal: Fernando Delgado
- Faculty: 189.33 (FTE)
- Grades: 09–12
- Enrollment: 2,635 (2023-2024)
- Student to teacher ratio: 13.92
- Campus type: Suburban
- Colors: Navy and gold
- Mascot: Cougar
- Website: edinburgnorth.ecisd.us

Edinburg North High School (commonly ENHS, Edinburg North, or North) is a public secondary school in Edinburg, Texas, United States, serving students in grades 9–12. The school is part of the Edinburg Consolidated Independent School District, with admission based primarily on the locations of students' homes. ENHS' mascot is the common Cougar, and their colors are navy and gold.

The school serves, in addition to northern Edinburg, the census-designated places of Faysville, Hargill, and Linn, as well as the rural parts of far northern Hidalgo County. The University of Texas Rio Grande Valley (UTRGV)'s Edinburg campus is also zoned into ENHS.

District expansion circa 2010 has added a performing arts center to each of ECISD's high schools (all completed November 2010), including at Edinburg North.
