= South Texas College =

Community college in Rio Grande Valley, Texas, US

- Type: Public community college
- Established: 1993; 33 years ago
- President: Ricardo Solis
- Academic staff: 660
- Students: 26,000
- Location: McAllen and Rio Grande Valley, Texas, United States; 26.216316°N 98.253316°W
- Colors: Blue and Yellow and Gold
- Website: www.southtexascollege.edu

South Texas College (STC) is a public community college in the Rio Grande Valley region of South Texas. It is accredited by the Commission on Colleges of the Southern Association of Colleges and Schools to award Bachelor of Applied Technology, Associate of Applied Science, Associate of Arts, and Associate of Science degrees. As of fall 2023, STC has an enrollment of over 26,000 students and a staff of approximately 1,600 working across six campuses. It was created on September 1, 1993, with the passage of Texas Senate Bill 251, the purpose of which was to serve Hidalgo and Starr County.

As defined by the Texas Legislature, the official service area of STC includes all of Hidalgo and Starr Counties.

== Campuses ==
- Pecan Campus (main), McAllen, Texas
- Mid-Valley Campus, Weslaco, Texas
- Starr County Campus, Rio Grande City, Texas
- Technology Campus, McAllen, Texas
- Ramiro R. Casso Nursing & Allied Health Campus, McAllen, Texas
- E-STC Virtual Campus

== Academics ==
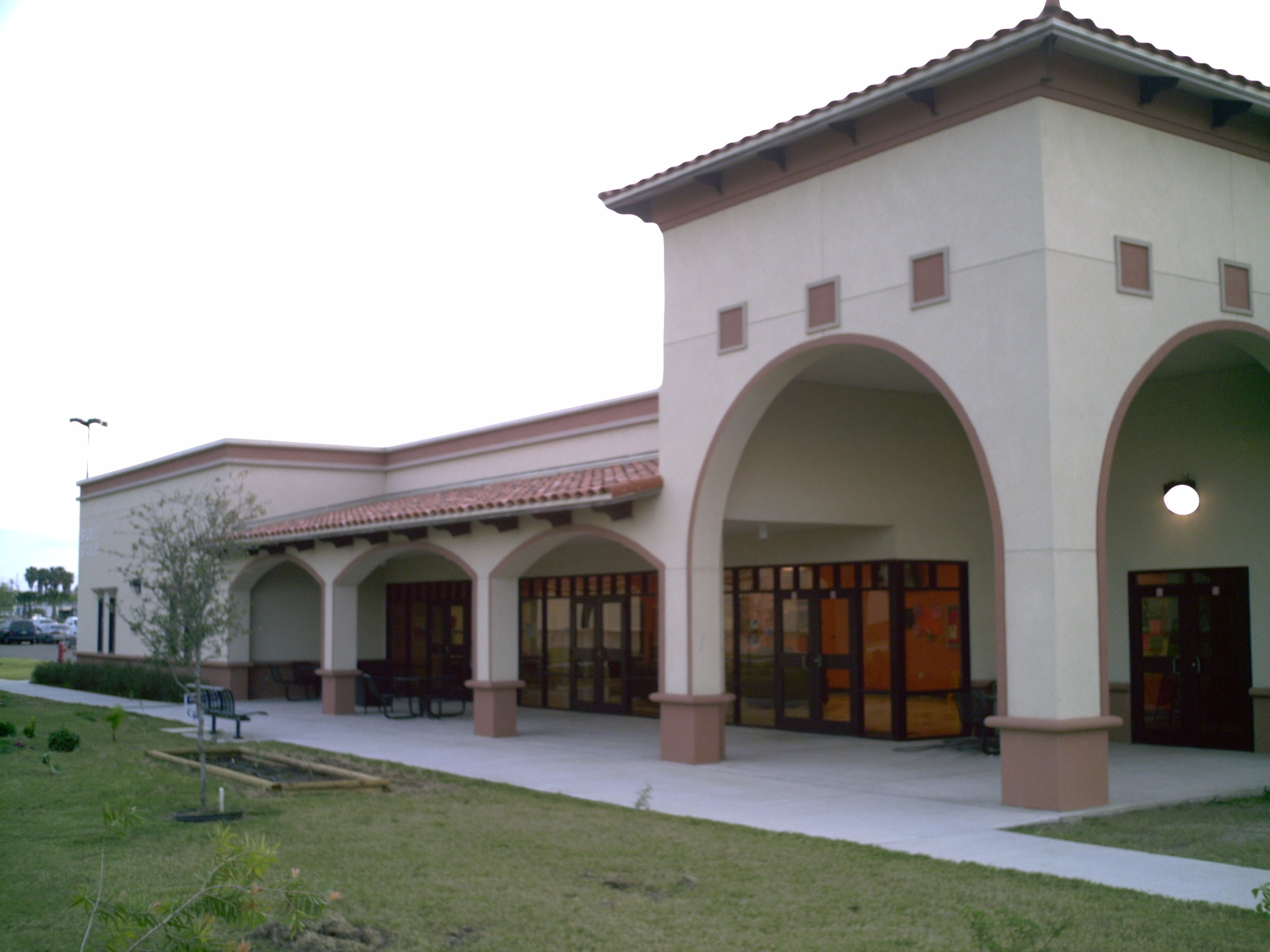
Student Success Building at the Mid-Valley Campus in Weslaco.

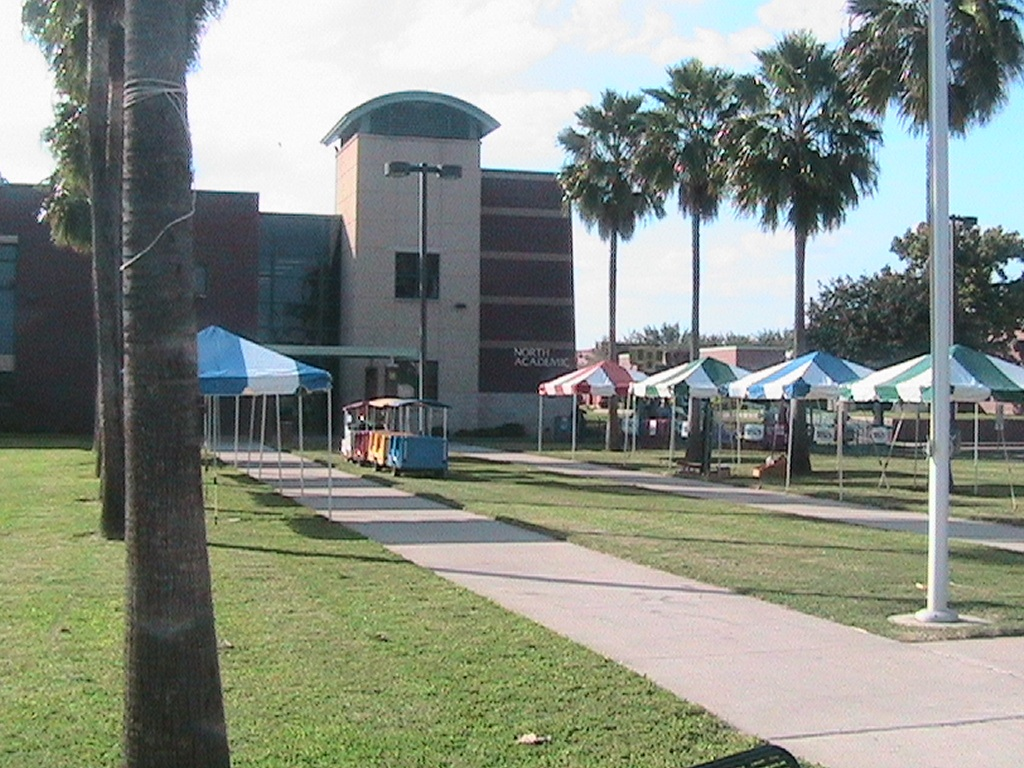
Fall Festival at STC

South Texas College is accredited by the Commission on Colleges of the Southern Association of Colleges and Schools to award Bachelor of Applied Technology, Associate of Applied Science, Associate of Arts and Associate of Science degrees and certificates. The college offers more than 100 degree and certificate program options, including associate degrees in a variety of art, science, technology and allied health fields of study. The college also offers the Bachelor of Applied Technology degree as well as online degree and certificate options.

South Texas College employs 428 full-time and 228 adjunct instructors. There are 384 faculty members with master's degrees, 46 hold two master's, 5 hold three master's, and 79 have doctorate degrees. In certificate and other programs, there are 97 faculty members holding bachelor's degrees and 44 with associate degrees. STC has more than 60 articulation agreements in place with colleges across the country for those students who wish to continue their education beyond an associate degree.

== North American Advanced Manufacturing Research and Education Initiative (NAAMREI) ==
The college is the fiscal agent and home of the executive offices for the North American Advanced Manufacturing Research and Education Initiative. STC serves as the Regional Institute for Advanced Manufacturing linked to all the community and technical colleges in the region. The college has taken the lead in helping train the workers to fuel a regional manufacturing economy and to support innovations in rapid response manufacturing.

== Notable people ==
=== Notable faculty ===
- William L. (Bill) Greene (born 1964, died 2019), American political science professor and faithless elector (2016)

=== Notable alumni ===
- Leo Lopez III (born 1989), National Hispanic Medical Association National Hispanic Resident of the Year (2017)
- Mayra Flores (born 1986), Member of the U.S. House of Representatives from Texas's 34th district

== Photos ==
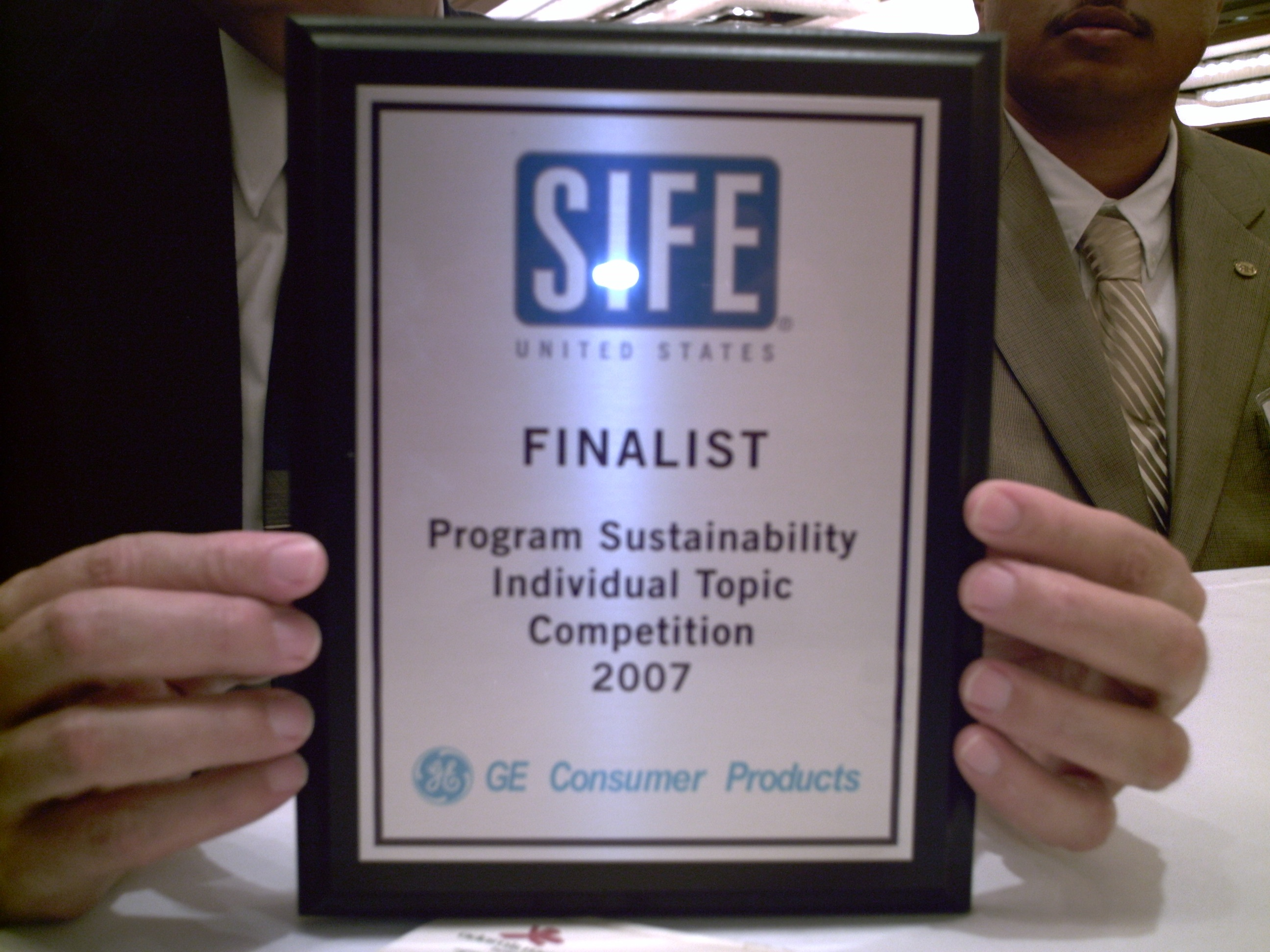
STC-SIFE special competition finalist

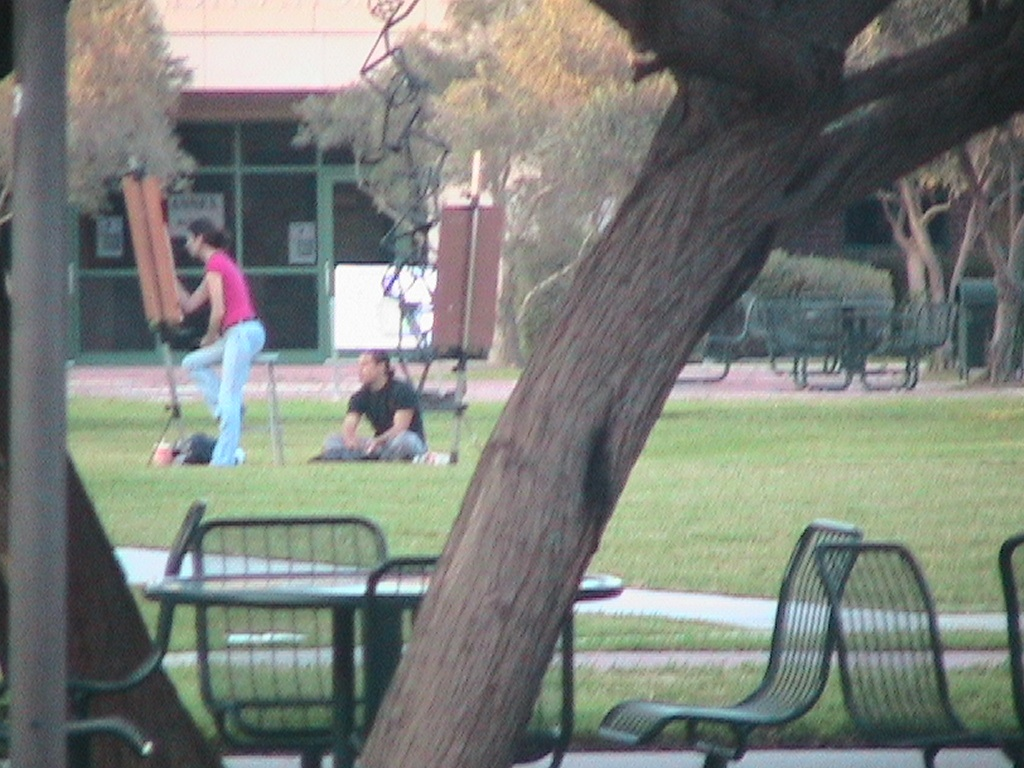
Pecan Campus Painting

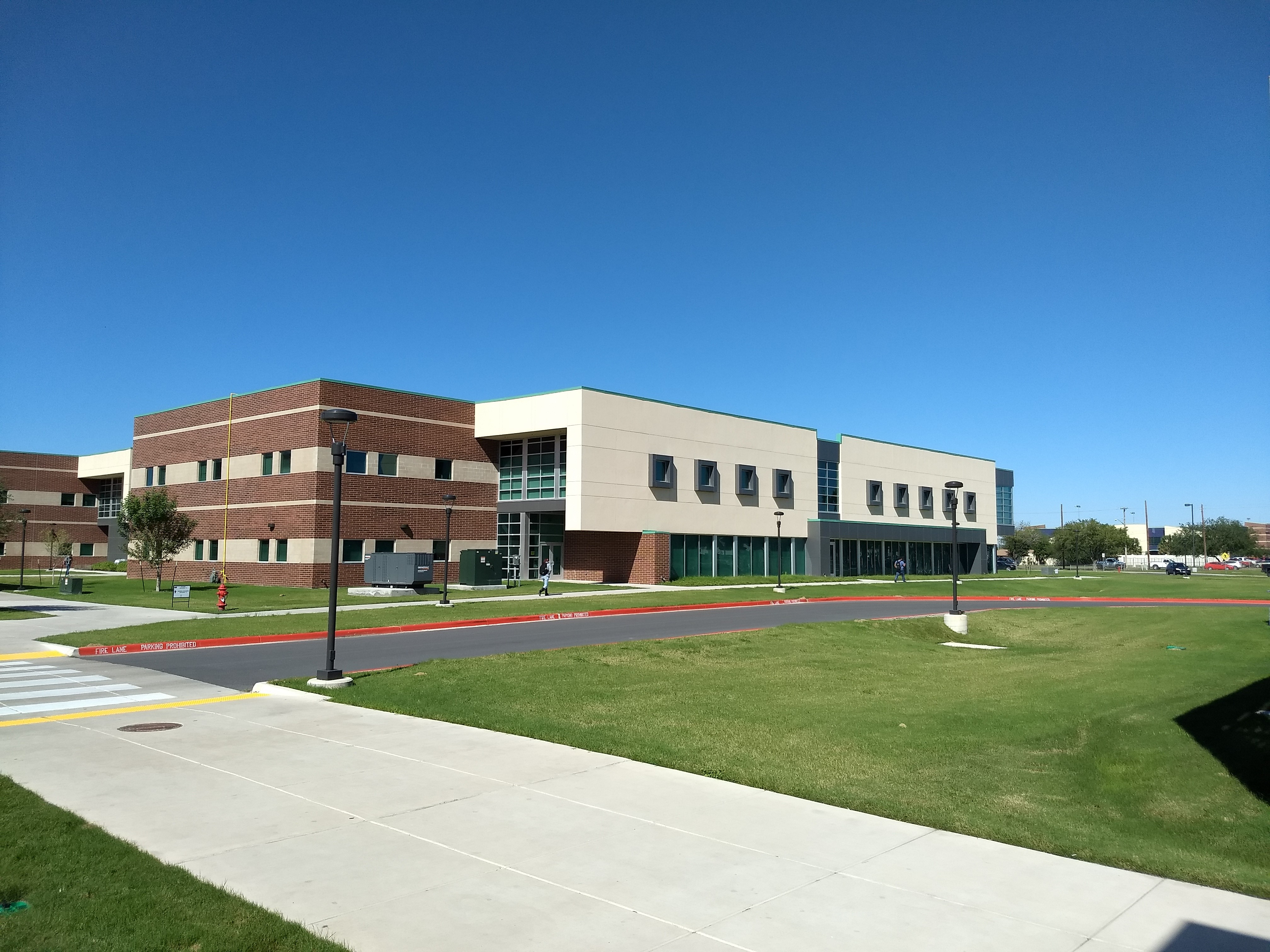
STC new building

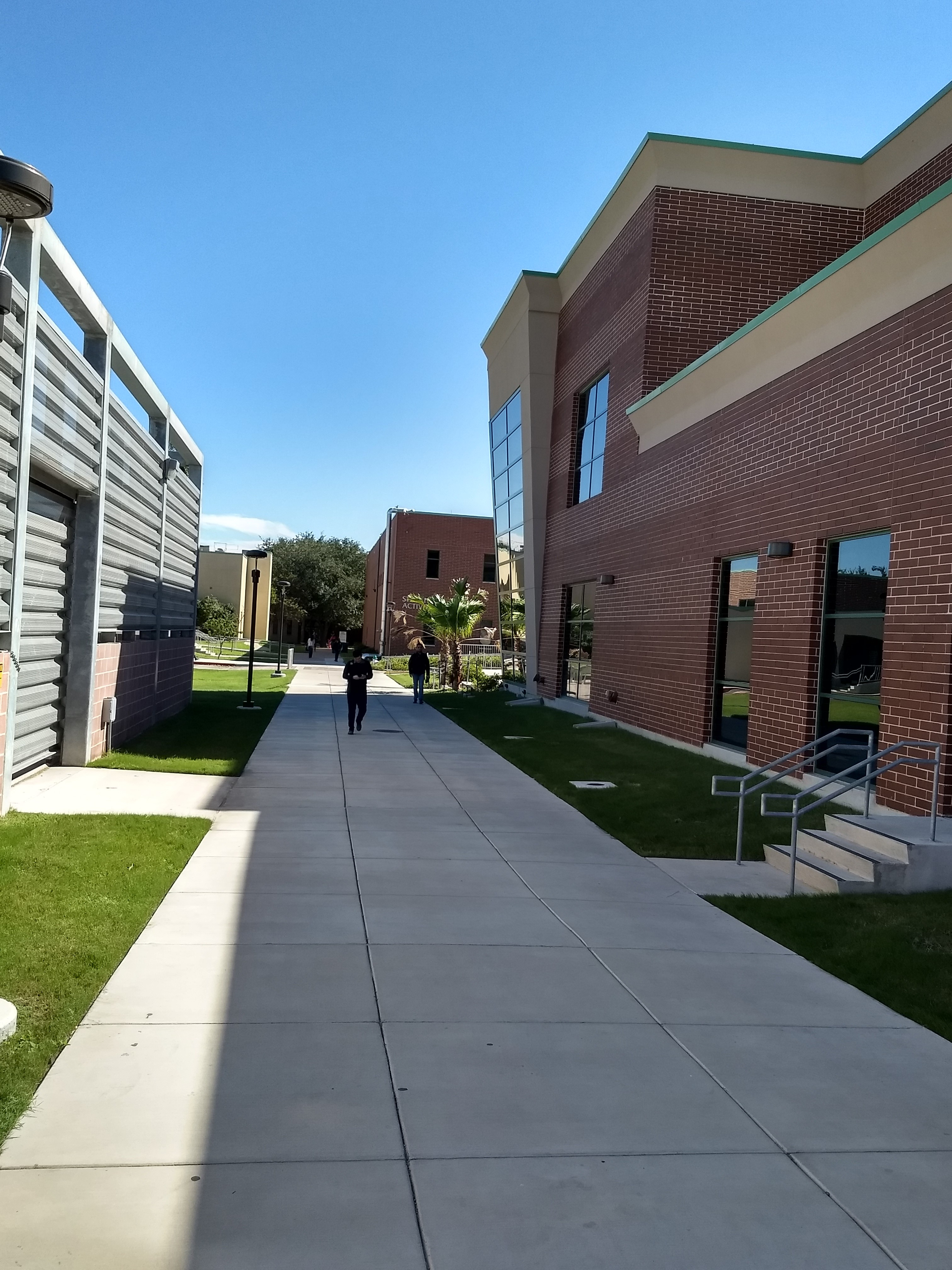
New STC Building Fall 2018

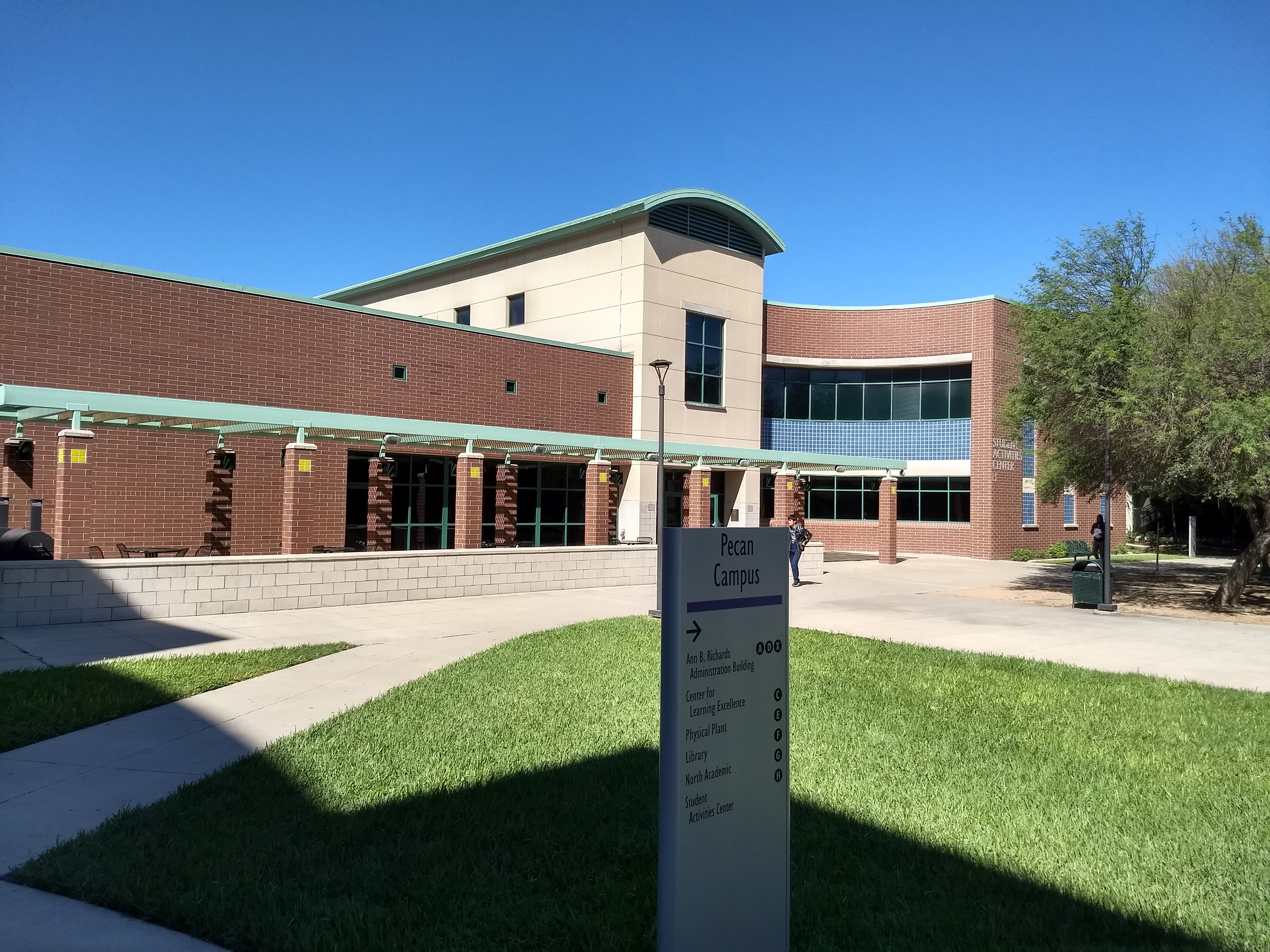
Building H Home of STC Culinary Arts Training

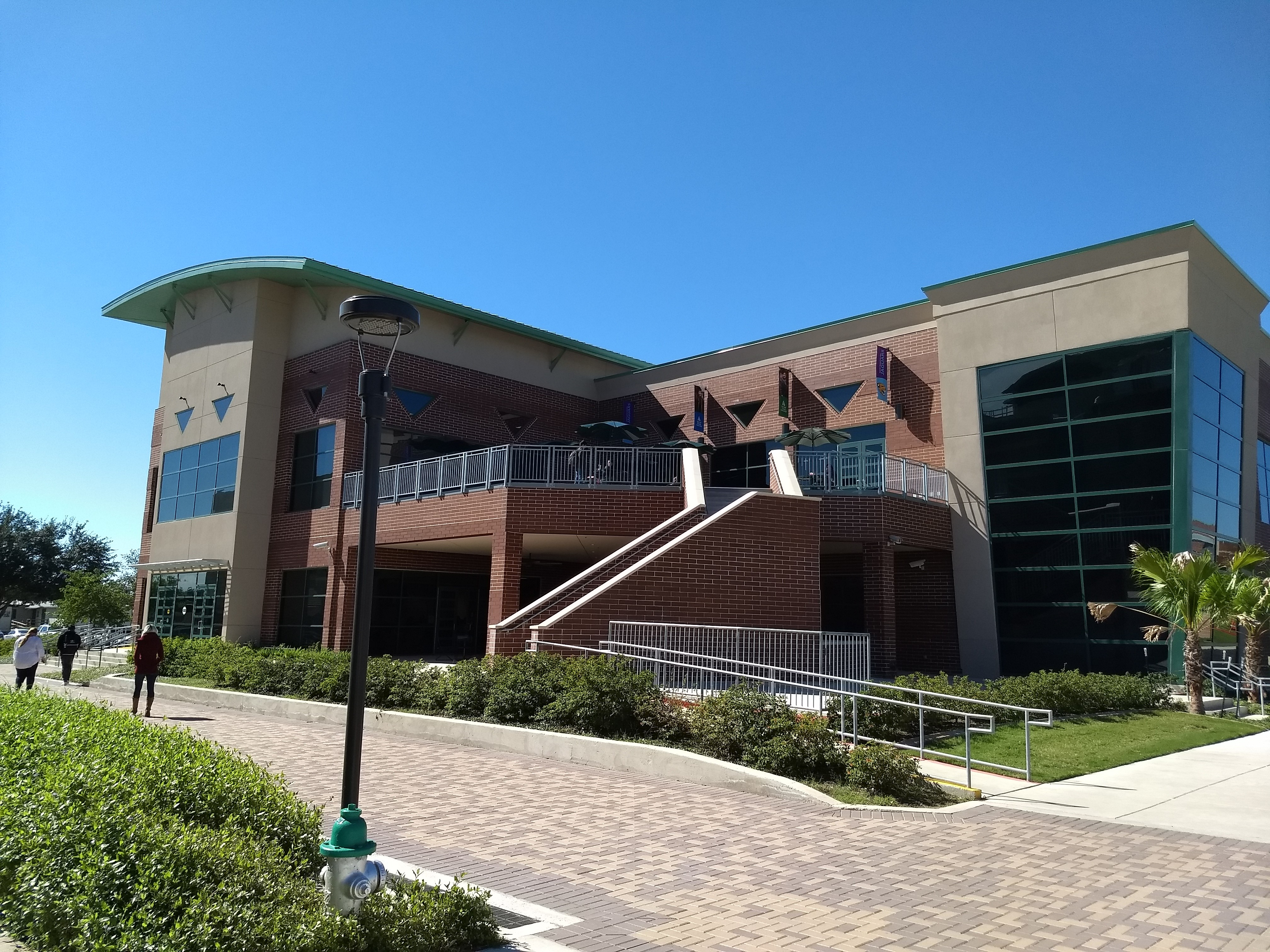
Student Union Building, and New Cafeteria

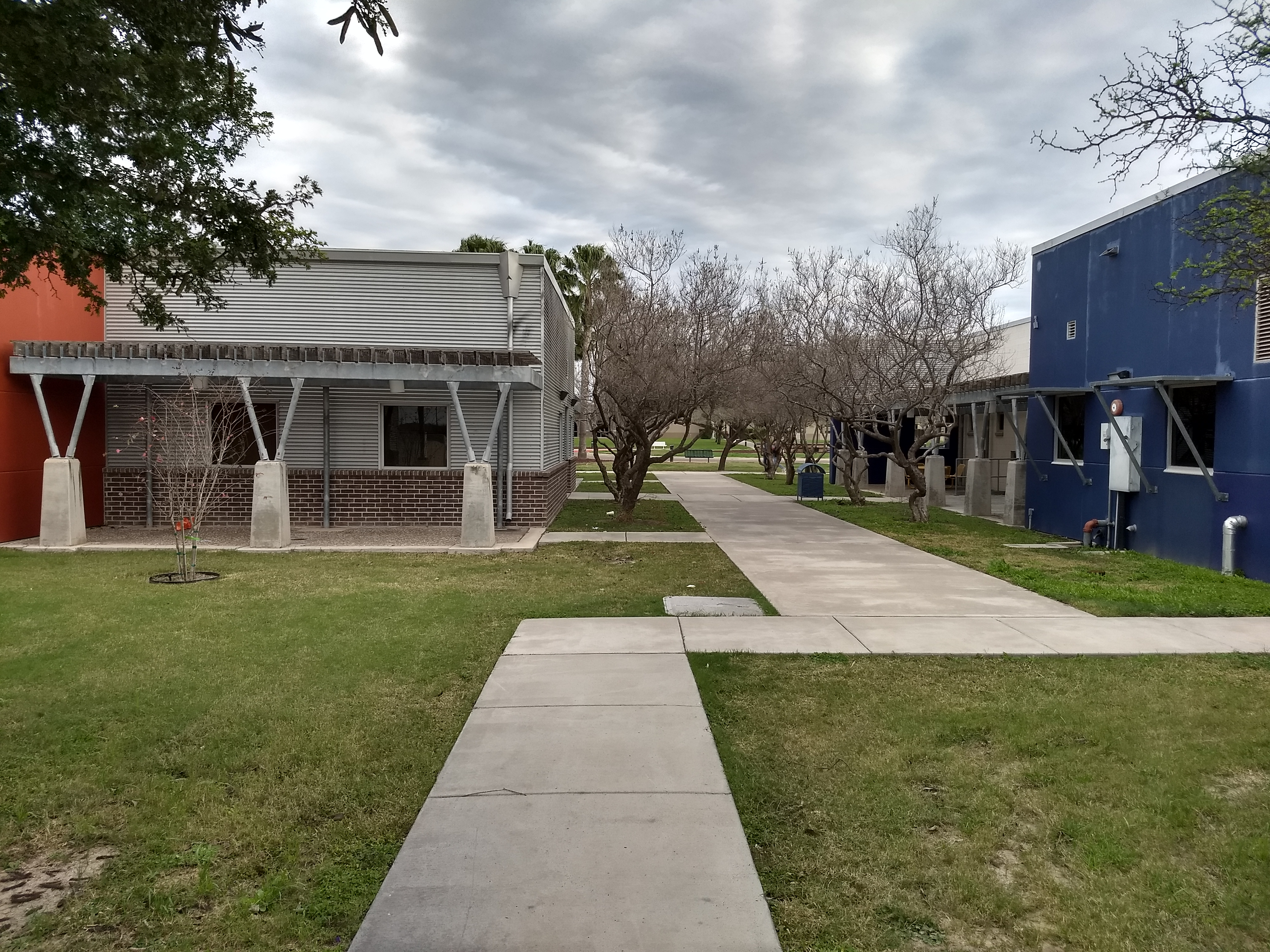
Starr Campus Walkway

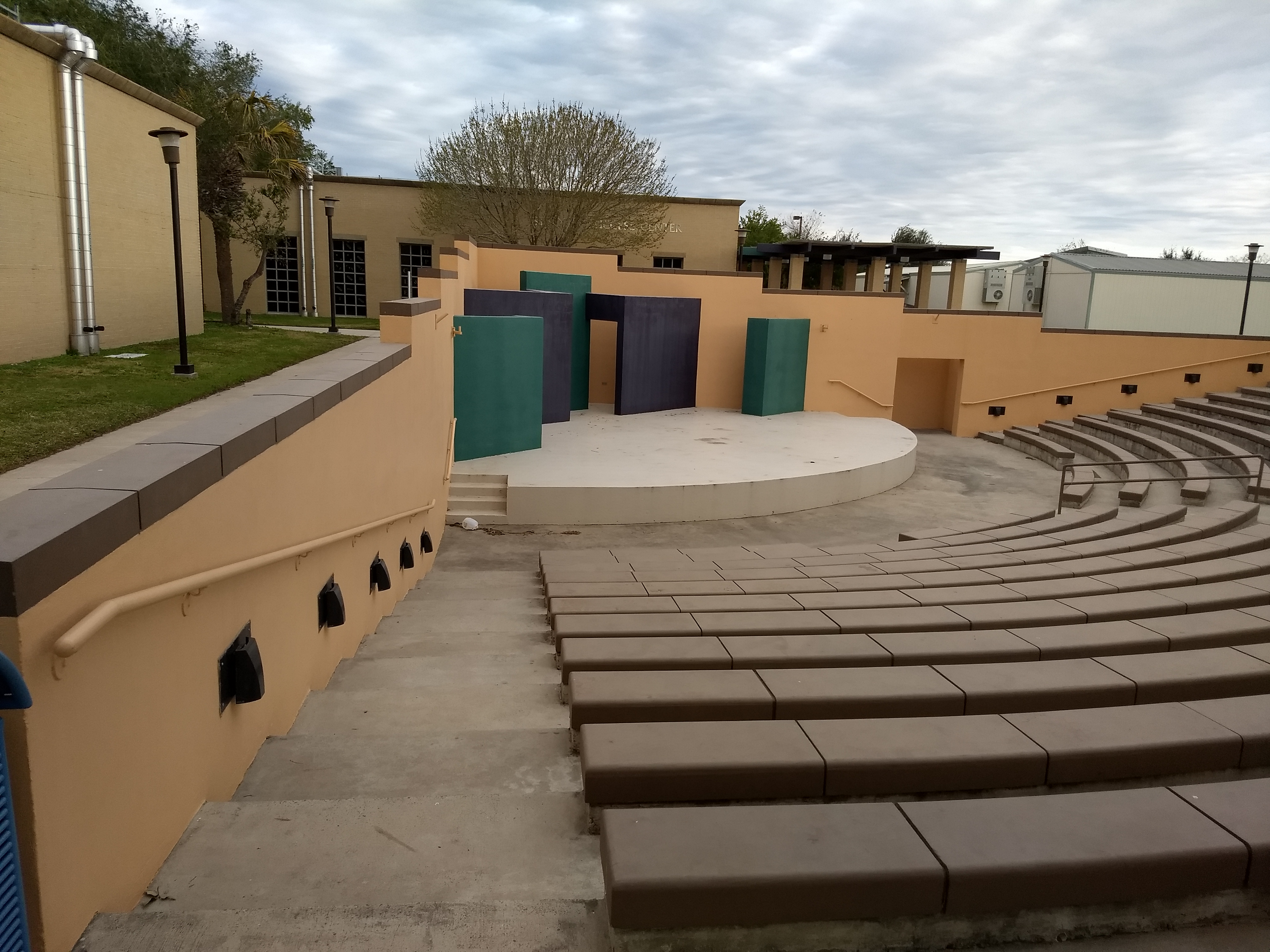
Starr County Campus Amphitheater

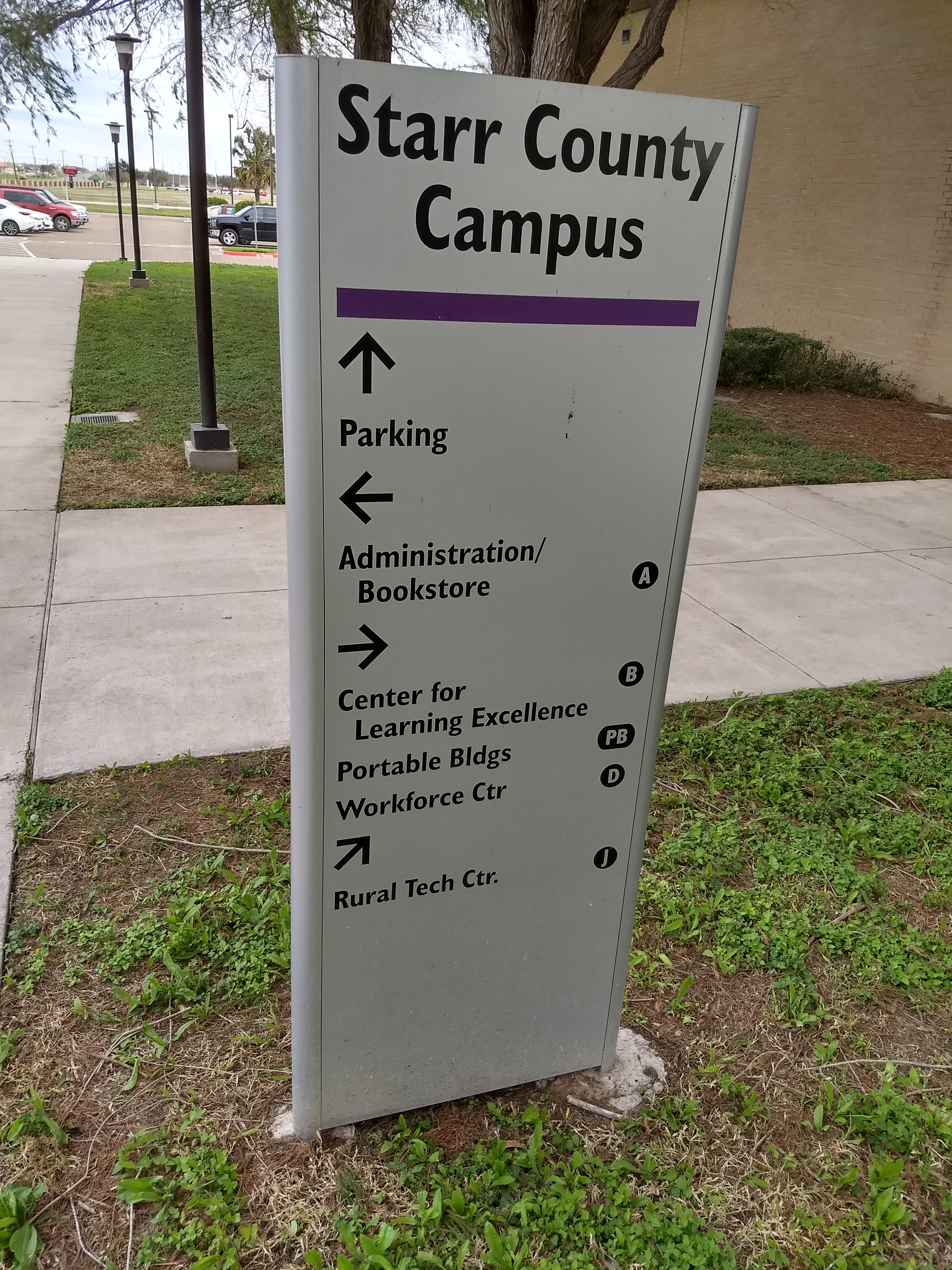
Sign on Campus (Starr County)

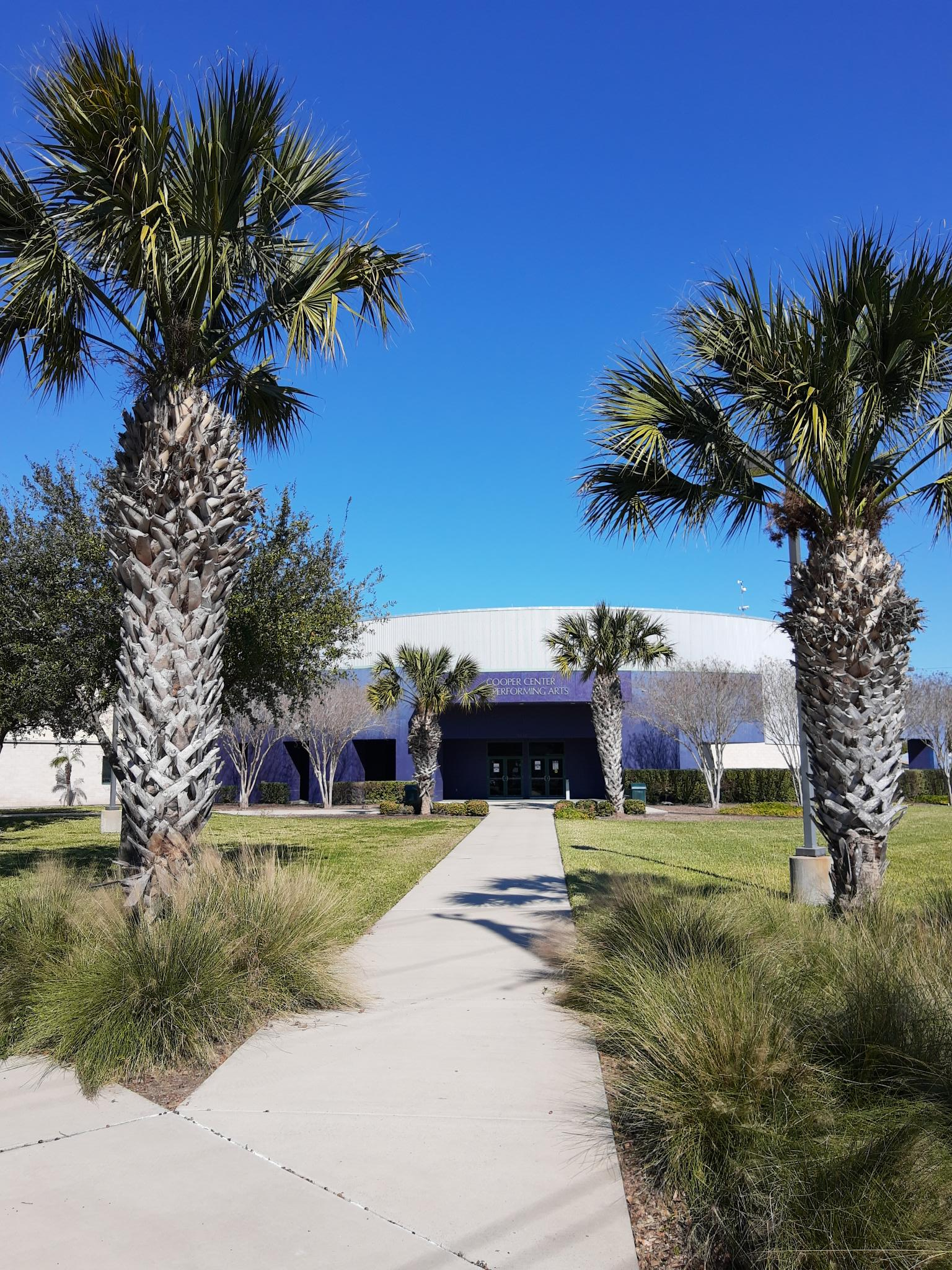
Cooper Center at South Texas College Pecan Campus McAllen Texas
