= Texas State Highway 107 =

State highway in Texas

State Highway 107
- SH 107, highlighted in red

Route information
- Maintained by TxDOT
- Length: 46.092 mi (74.178 km)
- Existed: by 1933–present

Major junctions
- West end: I-2 / US 83 in Mission
- SH 495 in Mission; SH 336 in McAllen; I-69C / US 281 in Edinburg
- East end: I-69E / US 77 in Combes

Location
- Country: United States
- State: Texas
- Counties: Hidalgo, Cameron

Highway system
- Highways in Texas; Interstate; US; State; Former; Toll; Loops; Spurs; FM/RM; Park; Rec
← SH 106	→ SH 108

State Highway 107 (SH 107) is a state highway in the U.S. state of Texas that runs from Mission to Combes in the Rio Grande Valley.

== Route description ==
SH 107 begins at an intersection with Interstate 2/US Route 83 in Mission and travels north through the center of town. It reaches an intersection with the old routing of US 83 and Texas State Highway 495 in Mission before exiting to the north. It passes through Palmhurst and Alton before turning right on Mile 7 Road. It then travels east through McAllen into downtown Edinburg, where it intersects the Business Route of US Route 281 and then I-69C/US 281 just to the east. It continues east through rural farmlands, passing through the towns of Elsa, Edcouch, and La Villa. The route then turns southeast into Cameron County, passing through Santa Rosa. The then turn back to the east, reaching the intersection of Business Route 77 and the eastern terminus at I-69E/US 77 in Combes.

== History ==
Historic SH 107

SH 107 was designated on March 16, 1925 from Aspermont to Newcastle.

Another SH 107 was designated from Santa Anna to the McCulloch county line on July 13, 1925.

On February 14, 1927, the SH 107 from Aspermont to Newcastle was renumbered as SH 120. As a result, there was only one SH 107 from Santa Anna to the McCulloch County line. On April 13, 1927, SH 107 extended south to Brady. On September 9, 1927, SH 107 was canceled as the route became an extension of SH 4.

On August 6, 1929, SH 4 was rerouted west, and SH 107 returned on the route from Santa Anna to Brady. On January 19, 1932, SH 107 was canceled, as the route became an extension of SH 16. On May 28, 1932, a new SH 107 was designated from Combes to Edinburg.

On July 15, 1935, SH 107 was canceled.

On December 21, 1935, SH 107 was restored.

It was extended west then south through Mission to Hidalgo on September 26, 1939, absorbing SH 250 and part of SH 48.

The route has changed little since then, with the stretch from Mission to Hidalgo being transferred to FM 1016 on November 23, 1948. On July 29, 1974, SH 107 was extended south one block over FM 1016 to Conway & 7th Streets. On May 21, 1979, SH 107 was extended from old US 77 to new US 77 and from old US 83 to new US 83.

== Major intersections ==
County	Location	mi	km	Destinations	Notes
Hidalgo	Mission	0	0.0	I-2 / US 83 / FM 1016 (S. Conway Avenue) – Pharr, Rio Grande City, McAllen	I-2 exit 136; western terminus.
Hidalgo	Mission	0.9	1.4	Bus. US 83 south (9th Street) – McAllen	
Hidalgo	Mission	1.0	1.6	Bus. US 83 north (Tom Landry Street) – Palmview	
Hidalgo	Mission	2.0	3.2	SH 495 (Griffin Parkway) – Palmview, McAllen	
Hidalgo	Palmhurst	4.0	6.4	FM 1924 (Buddy Owens Avenue) – McAllen	
Hidalgo	Alton	6.0	9.7	FM 676 (Commerce Street) – McAllen	
Hidalgo	Cantu	8.0	12.9	FM 681 (7 Mile Road) / FM 2993 (N. Conway Avenue) – McCook	
Hidalgo		10.5	16.9	FM 494 (N. Shary Road) – Palmhurst	
Hidalgo	McAllen	11.8	19.0	FM 2220 (N. Ware Road)	
Hidalgo	McAllen	13.2	21.2	FM 1926 (N. 23rd Street)	
Hidalgo	McAllen	14.0	22.5	SH 336 (N. 10th Street) – Hidalgo	
Hidalgo	Edinburg	15.2	24.5	FM 2061 (McColl Road) – McAllen	
Hidalgo	Edinburg	15.7	25.3	FM 3362 (Jackson Road) – McAllen, Pharr	
Hidalgo	Edinburg	17.2	27.7	Bus. US 281 (Closner Boulevard)	
Hidalgo	Edinburg	18.3	29.5	I-69C / US 281 – Pharr, Falfurrias	I-69C exit 6
Hidalgo	Edinburg	18.9	30.4	FM 1426 (Raul Longoria Road) – San Juan	
Hidalgo		20.8	33.5	FM 907 (Alamo Road) – Alamo	
Hidalgo		22.8	36.7	FM 2128 west (Richardson Road)	
Hidalgo	San Carlos	23.7	38.1	FM 1423 (Valverde Road) – Donna	
Hidalgo	La Blanca	25.3	40.7	FM 493 (La Blanca Road) – Donna, Hargill	
Hidalgo	Elsa	28.0	45.1	FM 88 (Broadway Street) – Weslaco, Monte Alto	
Hidalgo	Edcouch	29.0	46.7	FM 3071 (Mile 4 Road W)	
Hidalgo	Edcouch	30.1	48.4	FM 1015 (Llano Grande Street) – Weslaco, Lasara	
Hidalgo	La Villa	32.0	51.5	FM 491 (S. Chapa Road) – Mercedes, Lyford	
Hidalgo		37.0	59.5	FM 1425 – Heidelberg	
Cameron	Santa Rosa	39.4	63.4	FM 506 north (Santa Rosa Boulevard) – Sebastian	Begin overlay of FM 506
Cameron	Santa Rosa	40.0	64.4	FM 506 south (Santa Rosa Boulevard) – La Feria	End overlay of FM 506
Cameron		42.4	68.2	FM 800 (Bass Boulevard) – Primera	
Cameron	Combes	45.6	73.4	Bus. US 77	
Cameron	Combes	46.1	74.2	I-69E / US 77 / FM 508 (Templeton Avenue) – Harlingen, Raymondville	I-69E exit 30; eastern terminus.
1.000 mi = 1.609 km; 1.000 km = 0.621 mi: Concurrency terminus
