= Edcouch-Elsa High School =

Coordinates: 26.2982°N 97.9779°W

Location
- Hwy 107 Mile 4 North Yellow Jacket Drive; Elsa, Texas; United States

Information
- Type: Public
- School district: Edcouch-Elsa Independent School District
- Principal: Darren Earhart
- Teaching staff: 106.47 (FTE)
- Grades: 9-12
- Enrollment: 1,329 (2023-2024)
- Student to teacher ratio: 12.48
- Colors: Black and gold
- Athletics: Christian Navarro
- Mascot: Yellow jacket
- Website: www.eeisd.org/o/eehs

Edcouch-Elsa High School (EEHS) is a public high school in Elsa, Texas. It is part of the Edcouch-Elsa Independent School District and is known as La Maquina Amarilla; their mascot is a Yellow jacket. It is located at Hwy 107 Mile 4 North Yellow Jacket Drive.

In addition to Elsa, the school district includes Edcouch and sections of La Blanca, Laguna Seca, and Mila Doce.

== History ==
In the fall of 1968, Mexican American students demanded several things to be fixed by the schools, for example the eradication of the no Spanish-speaking rule. As the district did nothing for the students, 162 Chicano students walked out in protest. The school decided to expel 62 of the students. The newly-established Mexican American Legal Defense and Education Fund (MALDEF) filed a lawsuit against the schools. MALDEF claimed that the schools had violated the students' right to peaceful protest. In December, the courts agreed with MALDEF and demanded the school reinstate those students. This was the first major win for MALDEF in Texas.

== Student demographics ==
As of the 2007-2008 school year there was approximately 1,584 students at Edcouch-Elsa High School and they compete in 32-4A. 6% of the students are considered economically disadvantaged.

== Football ==
Since joining the 4A ranks in 1980, Edcouch-Elsa has experienced considerable success in the sport of football. The Yellow Jackets have successfully defended their 32-4a district title for the last six consecutive years (2003–2008), which brings them to a total of 46 district titles. The Yellow Jackets have also had a series of playoff runs through the decades, the furthest being a pair of quarterfinal appearances in 1989 and 1997.

The Edcouch-Elsa 7-on-7 team traveled to Louisiana to and took home the championship of the LSU 7-on-7 Tournament in July 2008

The Edcouch-Elsa 7-on-7 football team made its way to Texas A & M in 2012.

In 2012 Edcouch-Elsa was put under probation after their high school football team practiced 16 hours in week 0. The UIL rules say the teams have to practice 8 hours a week. The 2012 season district games were counted. Edcouch-Elsa made it to the 3rd round of playoffs

== See also ==
- Edcouch-Elsa Independent School District
