= List of highways numbered 491 =

The following highways are numbered 491:

== Canada ==
- Manitoba Provincial Road 491

== Cuba ==
- San Cristobal–Bahia Honda Road (1–491)
- 2–491 (Cuba)

== Israel ==
- Route 491 (Israel)

== Japan ==
- Japan National Route 491

== United States ==
- Interstate 491 (cancelled proposal)
- U.S. Route 491
- Delaware Route 491
- Florida State Road 491 (former)
- Maryland Route 491
- Pennsylvania Route 491
- Puerto Rico Highway 491

Preceded by 490	Lists of highways 491	Succeeded by 492
