= WEHS =

WEHS may refer to:

- WEHS-LP, a low-power radio station (101.7 FM) licensed to serve Eupora, Mississippi, United States
- WXFT-DT, a television station serving Chicago, Illinois, United States, broadcasting as WEHS between 1987 and 2001
- Wausau East High School, Wausau, Wisconsin, United States
- Weslaco East High School, Welasco, Texas, United States
- West Essex High School, North Caldwell, New Jersey, United States
- Wylie East High School, Wylie, Texas, United States
- Wyoming East High School, New Richmond, West Virginia, United States
