= EEHS =

EEHS may refer to:

- Emergency Evacuation Hyperbaric Stretcher
- Edcouch-Elsa High School, Elsa, Texas, United States
- Epsom and Ewell High School, Epsom, Surrey, England
