= Elsa, Texas =

- City
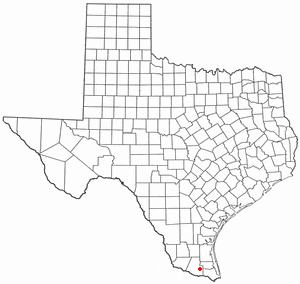
- Location of Elsa, Texas

- Coordinates: 26°17′52″N 97°59′34″W
- Country: United States of America
- State: Texas
- County: Hidalgo

Area
  - Total: 2.09 sq mi (5.41 km^{2})
  - Land: 2.09 sq mi (5.41 km^{2})
  - Water: 0 sq mi (0.00 km^{2})
- Elevation: 66 ft (20 m)

Population (2020)
  - Total: 5,668
  - Density: 2,716/sq mi (1,048.6/km^{2})
- Time zone: UTC-6 (Central (CST))
  - Summer (DST): UTC-5 (CDT)
- ZIP code: 78543
- Area code: 956
- FIPS code: 48-24036
- GNIS feature ID: 1335417
- Website: cityofelsa.net

Elsa is a city in Hidalgo County, Texas, United States. The population was 5,668 at the 2020 census. It is part of the McAllen–Edinburg–Mission and Reynosa–McAllen metropolitan areas.

== Geography ==
Elsa is located in eastern Hidalgo County at 26°17′52″N 97°59′34″W (26.297672, –97.992770), 9 miles (14 km) north of Weslaco and 11 miles (18 km) east of Edinburg on State Highway 107 and FM 88. It is bordered to the east by the city of Edcouch and to the west by the unincorporated community of La Blanca.

According to the United States Census Bureau, Elsa has a total area of 2.1 square miles (5.4 km^{2}), all land.

== Demographics ==
Historical population
Census	Pop.	Note	%±
1940	1,006		—
1950	3,179		216.0%
1960	3,847		21.0%
1970	4,400		14.4%
1980	5,061		15.0%
1990	5,242		3.6%
2000	5,549		5.9%
2010	5,660		2.0%
2020	5,668		0.1%
U.S. Decennial Census

=== 2020 census ===
As of the 2020 census, Elsa had a population of 5,668. The median age was 32.3 years, 31.4% of residents were under the age of 18, and 14.0% of residents were 65 years of age or older. For every 100 females there were 91.4 males, and for every 100 females age 18 and over there were 84.5 males age 18 and over.

99.5% of residents lived in urban areas, while 0.5% lived in rural areas.

There were 1,703 households in Elsa, of which 47.6% had children under the age of 18 living in them. Of all households, 39.8% were married-couple households, 15.6% were households with a male householder and no spouse or partner present, and 38.7% were households with a female householder and no spouse or partner present. About 16.7% of all households were made up of individuals and 8.1% had someone living alone who was 65 years of age or older.

There were 1,859 housing units, of which 8.4% were vacant. The homeowner vacancy rate was 0.9% and the rental vacancy rate was 5.7%.

Racial composition as of the 2020 census
Race	Number	Percent
White	2,141	37.8%
Black or African American	27	0.5%
American Indian and Alaska Native	27	0.5%
Asian	7	0.1%
Native Hawaiian and Other Pacific Islander	0	0.0%
Some other race	1,217	21.5%
Two or more races	2,249	39.7%
Hispanic or Latino (of any race)	5,473	96.6%

=== 2000 census ===
As of the census of 2000, there were 5,549 people, 1,575 households, and 1,324 families residing in the city. The population density was 3,756.8 inhabitants per square mile (1,450.5/km^{2}). There were 1,754 housing units at an average density of 1,187.5 per square mile (458.5/km^{2}). The racial makeup of the city was 74.5% White, 0.34% African American, 0.45% Native American, 0.05% Asian, 21.7% from other races, and 2.97% from two or more races. Hispanic or Latino of any race were 97.28% of the population.

There were 1,575 households, out of which 44.2% had children under the age of 18 living with them, 55.7% were married couples living together, 22.3% had a female householder with no husband present, and 15.9% were non-families. 14.9% of all households were made up of individuals, and 8.6% had someone living alone who was 65 years of age or older. The average household size was 3.52 and the average family size was 3.90.

In the city, the population was spread out, with 34.7% under the age of 18, 11.4% from 18 to 24, 25.0% from 25 to 44, 17.3% from 45 to 64, and 11.6% who were 65 years of age or older. The median age was 28 years. For every 100 females, there were 90.3 males. For every 100 females age 18 and over, there were 86.0 males.

The median income for a household in the city was $19,232, and the median income for a family was $21,831. Males had a median income of $21,957 versus $17,107 for females. The per capita income for the city was $7,550. About 33.5% of families and 38.3% of the population were below the poverty line, including 51.9% of those under age 18 and 32.2% of those age 65 or over.

== Government and infrastructure ==
The United States Postal Service operates the Elsa Post Office.

== Education ==
Elsa is served by the Edcouch-Elsa Independent School District. In addition, South Texas Independent School District operates magnet schools that serve the community.

The Elsa Public Library is located in Elsa.

== History ==
Elsa was settled as ranch land before 1800. Anglo-Americans settled in the area in the early 1900s; the town was laid out with the coming of the Texas and New Orleans Railroad in 1927, and incorporated in 1940.

The Ro-Tel brand of tomatoes and green chile, now known as a basic ingredient of Tex-Mex cooking, began in 1943 as a family canning plant in Elsa established by Carl Roetelle.
