= List of highways numbered 492 =

The following highways are numbered 492:

== Japan ==
- Japan National Route 492

== United States ==
- Florida State Road 492
- Louisiana Highway 492
- County Road 492 (Marquette County, Michigan)
- Mississippi Highway 492
- Pennsylvania Route 492
- Puerto Rico Highway 492

Preceded by 491	Lists of highways 492	Succeeded by 493
