= Texas State Highway 336 =

State highway in Texas

State Highway 336
- SH 336, highlighted in red

Route information
- Maintained by TxDOT
- Length: 14.506 mi (23.345 km)
- Existed: 1940–present

Major junctions
- South end: Spur 241 in Hidalgo
- I-2 / US 83 in McAllen
- North end: SH 107 in Edinburg

Location
- Country: United States
- State: Texas

Highway system
- Highways in Texas; Interstate; US; State; Former; Toll; Loops; Spurs; FM/RM; Park; Rec
← SH 335	→ SH 337

State Highway 336 (SH 336) is a 14.506-mile (23.345 km) state highway in the U.S. state of Texas. The highway begins at a junction with Spur 241 in Hidalgo and heads north to a junction with State Highway 107 (SH 107) in Edinburg.

== History ==
SH 336 was designated on November 22, 1940 to serve as a route between Hidalgo and Edinburg.

== Route description ==
SH 336 begins at a junction with Spur 241 in Hidalgo. It heads north from this junction to an intersection with FM 1016 in McAllen. The highway continues to the north to an intersection with I-2/US 83. The highway continues north through McAllen to an intersection with SH 495. SH 336 reaches its northern terminus at SH 107 in Edinburg.

== Junction list ==
The entire route is in Hidalgo County.

Location	mi	km	Destinations	Notes
Hidalgo			Spur 241	
McAllen			FM 1016	
McAllen			I-2 / US 83	I-2 exit 142
McAllen			Bus. US 83	
McAllen			SH 495	
Edinburg			SH 107	
1.000 mi = 1.609 km; 1.000 km = 0.621 mi
