= List of highways numbered 494 =

The following highways are numbered 494:

== Japan ==
- Japan National Route 494

== United States ==
- Interstate 494
- Interstate 494 (disambiguation) (cancelled proposals in Illinois)
- Maryland Route 494
- Puerto Rico Highway 494
- Texas State Highway Loop 494

Preceded by 493	Lists of highways 494	Succeeded by 495
