= Weslaco Independent School District =

School district in Texas, United States

Address
- 319 West Fourth Street Weslaco, Texas, USA ESC Region 1
- Coordinates: 26°9′28″N 99°59′47″W

District information
- Type: Independent School District
- Grades: PK-12
- Established: March 22, 1921; 105 years ago
- Superintendent: Dr. Richard Rivera
- Governing agency: Texas Education Agency
- Schools: 20
- NCES District ID: 4844960

Students and staff
- Students: 16,044 (2025-2026)

Other information
- Website: www.wisd.us

Weslaco Independent School District is a school district headquartered in Weslaco, Texas, United States.

It was created in 1921 after the city (established in 1919) successfully petitioned the state legislature to separate from Donna and their district. The district serves the city of Weslaco, a western portion of the city of Mercedes, and several unincorporated communities in Hidalgo County. This includes much of Midway South (sections east of South Midway Road), a portion of Midway North, Villa Verde, Olivarez, Llano Grande, and the WISD part of Mila Doce.

== History ==
Weslaco ISD was formed in 1921 after the city of Weslaco successfully petitioned the state legislature to separate from Donna ISD. North Ward Elementary School was one of the first schools, opening in 1921 with only hispanic students. North Ward was renamed after Leoline Horton sometime between 1939-1941.

By 1984, WISD operated 7 campuses with a total of just over 9000 students: Weslaco High School (grades 9-12), Mary Hoge Junior High School (7-8), Armondo Cuellar Elementary School (5-6), Sam Houston Elementary School (4), the new Dr. R.E. Margo Elementary School (2-3), Roosevelt Elementary School (1), and Louise Black Elementary School (Kindergarten).

Horton Elementary School returned to service in 1985, serving all WISD pre-kindergarten (PK) students. The district surpassed 10,000 total students by 1987, when Houston ES began housing only 6th graders and Cuellar ES switched to grades 4-5.

1988 saw a few changes. Roosevelt ES began housing all WISD 4th graders, while Margo ES and two new elementary schools (Airport ES and Border ES) served grades 1-3. More changes took place in 1989, with Hoge JH serving only 8th grade, all 7th graders moving to the renamed Cuellar JH, 5th graders moving to Black ES, and the 4 elementary campuses serving grades K-4.

In 1990, Black ES and Houston ES split the district's 5th and 6th graders, and Border ES became Memorial ES. 1991 saw massive changes with the elementary campuses. North Bridge Elementary School opened this year and the elementary campuses transitioned to PK-3. Horton became a full elementary school, while Hoge and Cuellar became "Middle Schools" with grades 6-8 and Black and Houston were renamed as "Intermediate Schools" with grades 4-5. WISD reached 11,000 students by 1991 and 12,000 by 1992.

In 1993, Central Middle School opened, and the middle schools returned to housing grades 7-8. All WISD 9th graders moved to the newly renamed Hoge Academy. Stephen F. Austin Early Childhood School opened as a PK-only facility. The elementary (PK-4) and intermediate schools (5-6) received new grade configurations.

A.N. Rico and Clecker-Heald Elementary Schools opened in 1994, followed by Beatriz G. Garza Intermediate School in 1997. Weslaco East High School opened with all WISD 9th and 10th graders in 2000, leaving 11th and 12th grade students at Weslaco High School. The is allowed Hoge to return to a middle school campus that year.

In 2002, the high schools officially split and WEHS gained 11th graders, scheduled to gain 12th grade the following year. Austin Early Childhood School closed and the intermediate campuses were phased out in 2002 as well, with Garza becoming a "Middle School" and the others transitioning into elementary campuses. The district reconfigured grade levels, moving to a PK-5, 6-8, and 9-12 setup.

Horton ES transitioned into Horton Disciplinary Alternative Education Program (DAEP) in 2003.

PFC Mario Ybarra Elementary School was the next major addition, opening in 2010.

== Schools ==
=== High schools (grades 9-12) ===
Name	Established	Mascot	Colors	Additional information
Weslaco High School	1921	Panthers	Purple & White	Current campus opened in 1973
Weslaco East High School	2000	Wildcats	Black, White, & Purple	Operated as 9-10 campus for 2 years before splitting from WHS and introducing 11th grade

=== Middle schools (grades 6-8) ===
Name	Established	Mascot	Colors	Additional information
Central Middle School	1993	Pumas	Purple, Gray, & White	
Dr. Armando Cuellar Middle School	2010	Wildcats	Black & Gray	
Beatriz G. Garza Middle School	1997	Katz	Purple & White	
Mary Hoge Middle School	1968	Jaguars	Black & White	

=== Elementary schools (grades PK-5) ===
Name	Established	Additional information
Airport Drive Elementary School		
Louise Black Elementary School		
Cleckler-Heald Elementary School		
Raul A. Gonzalez, Jr. Elementary School		
Sam Houston Elementary School		
Dr. R. E. Margo Elementary School		
Memorial Elementary School		
North Bridge Elementary School	1991	
A. N. "Tony" Rico Elementary School	1994	
Rodolfo "Rudy" Silva, Jr. Elementary School		

=== Alternative Schools ===
Name	Established	Grades	Additional information
South Palm Gardens High School			
Weslaco Alternative School			

=== Former Schools ===
Name	Opened	Closed	Additional information
Stephen F. Austin Elementary School	1921	2018	

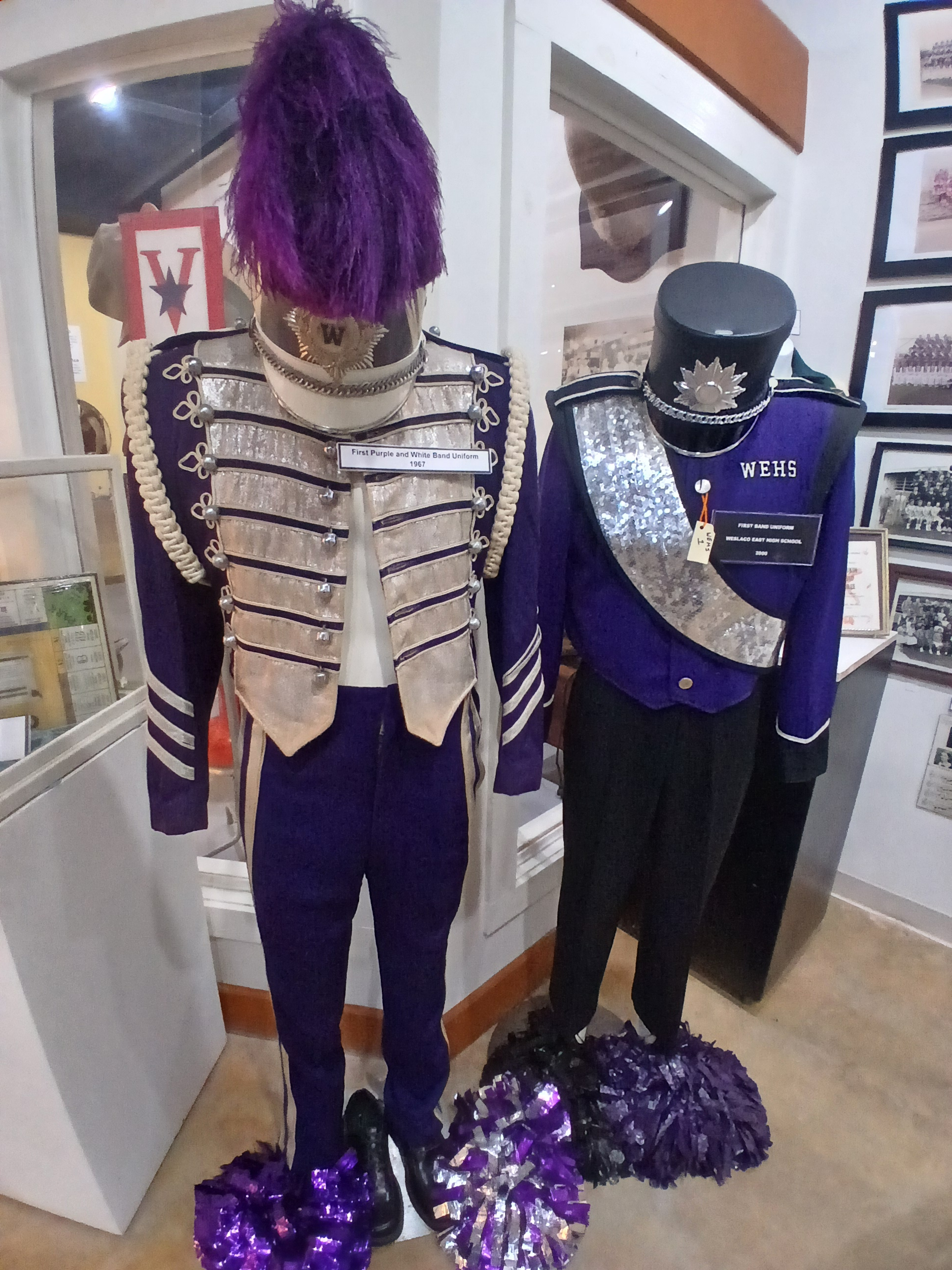
Museum display of the first purple WHS band uniform (1967) and the first ever WEHS band uniform (2000
