= List of highways numbered 495 =

Route 495, or Highway 495, can refer to:

== Canada ==
- New Brunswick Route 495

== Japan ==
- Japan National Route 495

== United States ==
- Interstate 495 (disambiguation)
- Maryland Route 495
- New Jersey Route 495
- New York State Route 495
- Puerto Rico Highway 495
- Texas:
  - Texas State Highway 495
  - Farm to Market Road 495 (former)

| Preceded by 494 | Lists of highways 495 | Succeeded by 496 |
