= Llano Grande, Texas =

Census-designated place in Hidalgo County, Texas, United States

- Census-designated place
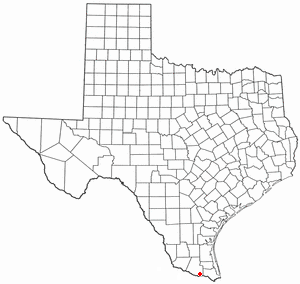
- Location of Llano Grande, Texas

- Coordinates: 26°7′49″N 97°58′7″W
- Country: United States of America
- State: Texas
- County: Hidalgo

Area
  - Total: 1.7 sq mi (4.5 km^{2})
  - Land: 1.7 sq mi (4.5 km^{2})
  - Water: 0 sq mi (0.0 km^{2})
- Elevation: 72 ft (22 m)

Population (2020)
  - Total: 2,952
  - Density: 1,700/sq mi (660/km^{2})
- Time zone: UTC-6 (Central (CST))
  - Summer (DST): UTC-5 (CDT)
- FIPS code: 48-43150
- GNIS feature ID: 1852731

Llano Grande (Spanish "Great Plain") is a census-designated place (CDP) in Hidalgo County, Texas, United States. The population was 2,952 at the 2020 United States Census. It is part of the McAllen–Edinburg–Mission Metropolitan Statistical Area. Llano Grande means "Big Plain" in Spanish. Nearby Llano Grande State Park is popular with bird watchers and the supposed site of many ghost appearances, including the ghosts of historic figures in Texas history.

== Geography ==
Llano Grande is located at 26°7′49″N 97°58′7″W (26.130397, -97.968505).

According to the United States Census Bureau, the CDP has a total area of 1.7 square miles (4.4 km^{2}), all land.

== Demographics ==
Historical population
Census	Pop.	Note	%±
2000	3,333		—
2010	3,008		−9.8%
2020	2,952		−1.9%
U.S. Decennial Census; 1850–1900 1910; 1920 1930 1940; 1950 1960 1970; 1980 1990 2000; 2010 2020

Llano Grande first appeared as a census designated place in the 2000 U.S. census.

=== 2020 census ===
Llano Grande CDP, Texas – Racial and ethnic composition Note: the US Census treats Hispanic/Latino as an ethnic category. This table excludes Latinos from the racial categories and assigns them to a separate category. Hispanics/Latinos may be of any race.
Race / Ethnicity (NH = Non-Hispanic)	Pop 2000	Pop 2010	Pop 2020	% 2000	% 2010	% 2020
White alone (NH)	369	510	378	11.07%	16.95%	12.80%
Black or African American alone (NH)	0	4	0	0.00%	0.13%	0.00%
Native American or Alaska Native alone (NH)	0	2	0	0.00%	0.07%	0.00%
Asian alone (NH)	12	4	2	0.36%	0.13%	0.07%
Native Hawaiian or Pacific Islander alone (NH)	0	0	0	0.00%	0.00%	0.00%
Other race alone (NH)	0	1	4	0.00%	0.03%	0.14%
Mixed race or Multiracial (NH)	5	0	4	0.15%	0.00%	0.14%
Hispanic or Latino (any race)	2,947	2,487	2,564	88.42%	82.68%	86.86%
Total	3,333	3,008	2,952	100.00%	100.00%	100.00%

As of the census of 2000, there were 3,333 people, 907 households, and 791 families residing in the CDP. The population density was 1,931.0 inhabitants per square mile (745.6/km^{2}). There were 1,268 housing units at an average density of 734.6 per square mile (283.6/km^{2}). The racial makeup of the CDP was 79.90% White, 0.06% African American, 0.24% Native American, 0.36% Asian, 18.93% from other races, and 0.51% from two or more races. Hispanic or Latino of any race were 88.42% of the population.

There were 907 households, out of which 47.1% had children under the age of 18 living with them, 70.5% were married couples living together, 12.6% had a female householder with no husband present, and 12.7% were non-families. 11.2% of all households were made up of individuals, and 8.5% had someone living alone who was 65 years of age or older. The average household size was 3.67 and the average family size was 4.00.

In the CDP, the population was spread out, with 35.3% under the age of 18, 10.0% from 18 to 24, 23.9% from 25 to 44, 16.1% from 45 to 64, and 14.7% who were 65 years of age or older. The median age was 28 years. For every 100 females, there were 95.1 males. For every 100 females age 18 and over, there were 88.8 males.

The median income for a household in the CDP was $20,491, and the median income for a family was $21,429. Males had a median income of $17,218 versus $12,826 for females. The per capita income for the CDP was $6,954. About 35.5% of families and 40.6% of the population were below the poverty line, including 54.1% of those under age 18 and 23.4% of those age 65 or over.

== Education ==
Llano Grande is served by the Weslaco Independent School District. It is zoned to Dr. R. E. Margo Elementary School, Dr. Armando Cuellar Middle School, and Weslaco East High School.

In addition, South Texas Independent School District operates magnet schools that serve the community.

== Gallery ==
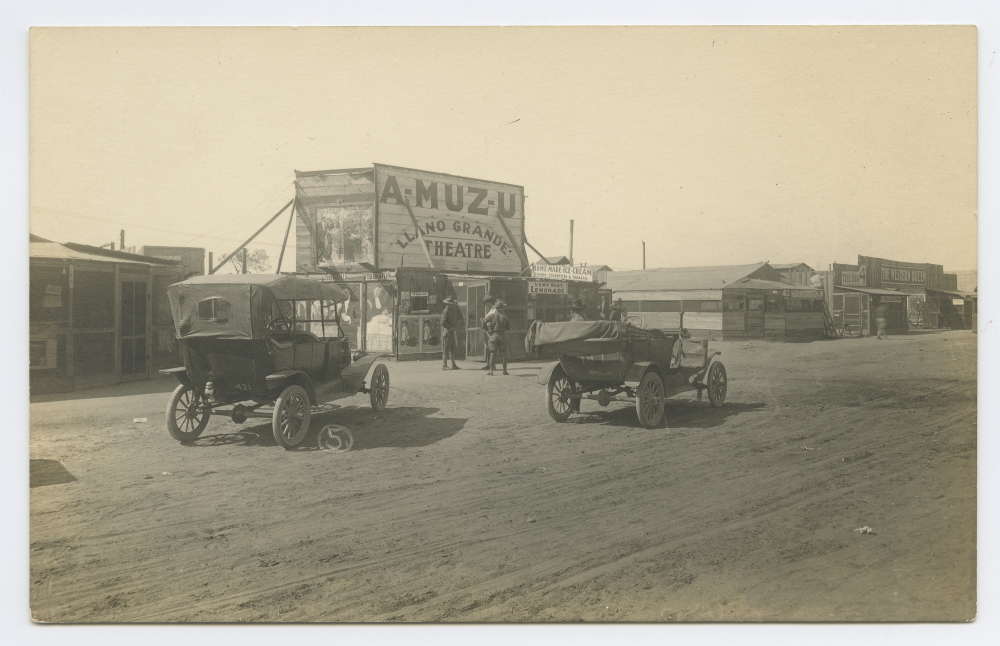
A-MUZ-U Theatre 1916.

== See also ==
- List of census-designated places in Texas
