= Olivarez, Texas =

- Census-designated place
- Coordinates: 26°14′11″N 97°59′37″W
- Country: United States of America
- State: Texas
- County: Hidalgo

Area
  - Total: 3.7 sq mi (9.5 km^{2})
  - Land: 3.7 sq mi (9.5 km^{2})
  - Water: 0 sq mi (0.0 km^{2})
- Elevation: 66 ft (20 m)

Population (2020)
  - Total: 4,248
  - Density: 1,200/sq mi (450/km^{2})
- Time zone: UTC-6 (Central (CST))
  - Summer (DST): UTC-5 (CDT)
- ZIP code: 78599
- Area codes: 512 and 737
- FIPS code: 48-53934
- GNIS feature ID: 1852748

Olivarez is a census-designated place (CDP) in Hidalgo County, Texas, United States. The population was 4,248 at the 2020 United States Census. It is part of the McAllen–Edinburg–Mission Metropolitan Statistical Area.

== Geography ==
Olivarez is located at 26°14′11″N 97°59′37″W (26.236325, -97.993523).

According to the United States Census Bureau, the CDP has a total area of 3.7 square miles (9.6 km^{2}), all land.

== Demographics ==
Historical population
Census	Pop.	Note	%±
2000	2,445		—
2010	3,827		56.5%
2020	4,248		11.0%
U.S. Decennial Census; 1850–1900 1910; 1920 1930 1940; 1950 1960 1970; 1980 1990 2000; 2010 2020

Olivarez first appeared as a census designated place in the 2000 U.S. census.

=== Racial and ethnic composition ===
Olivarez CDP, Texas – Racial and ethnic composition Note: the US Census treats Hispanic/Latino as an ethnic category. This table excludes Latinos from the racial categories and assigns them to a separate category. Hispanics/Latinos may be of any race.
Race / Ethnicity (NH = Non-Hispanic)	Pop 2000	Pop 2010	Pop 2020	% 2000	% 2010	% 2020
White alone (NH)	49	68	82	2.00%	1.78%	1.93%
Black or African American alone (NH)	0	4	1	0.00%	0.10%	0.02%
Native American or Alaska Native alone (NH)	0	0	0	0.00%	0.00%	0.00%
Asian alone (NH)	18	7	5	0.74%	0.18%	0.12%
Native Hawaiian or Pacific Islander alone (NH)	0	2	0	0.00%	0.05%	0.00%
Other race alone (NH)	0	0	8	0.00%	0.00%	0.19%
Mixed race or Multiracial (NH)	1	0	7	0.04%	0.00%	0.16%
Hispanic or Latino (any race)	2,377	3,746	4,145	97.22%	97.88%	97.58%
Total	2,445	3,827	4,248	100.00%	100.00%	100.00%

=== 2020 census ===
As of the 2020 census, Olivarez had a population of 4,248. The median age was 28.0 years. 33.0% of residents were under the age of 18 and 8.8% were 65 years of age or older. For every 100 females there were 97.8 males, and for every 100 females age 18 and over there were 97.0 males.

95.3% of residents lived in urban areas, while 4.7% lived in rural areas.

There were 1,040 households in Olivarez, of which 54.7% had children under the age of 18 living in them. Of all households, 55.5% were married-couple households, 13.2% were households with a male householder and no spouse or partner present, and 25.5% were households with a female householder and no spouse or partner present. About 11.0% of all households were made up of individuals, and 5.2% had someone living alone who was 65 years of age or older.

There were 1,094 housing units, of which 4.9% were vacant. The homeowner vacancy rate was 0.3% and the rental vacancy rate was 8.0%.

=== 2000 census ===
As of the 2000 census, there were 2,445 people, 511 households, and 481 families residing in the CDP. The population density was 663.1 inhabitants per square mile (256.0/km^{2}). There were 562 housing units at an average density of 152.4 per square mile (58.8/km^{2}). The racial makeup of the CDP was 95.05% White, 0.04% African American, 0.78% Asian, 3.48% from other races, and 0.65% from two or more races. Hispanic or Latino of any race were 97.22% of the population.

There were 511 households, out of which 70.8% had children under the age of 18 living with them, 77.9% were married couples living together, 12.1% had a female householder with no husband present, and 5.7% were non-families. 4.5% of all households were made up of individuals, and 1.4% had someone living alone who was 65 years of age or older. The average household size was 4.76 and the average family size was 4.88.

In the CDP, the population was spread out, with 41.7% under the age of 18, 13.0% from 18 to 24, 27.6% from 25 to 44, 13.7% from 45 to 64, and 4.0% who were 65 years of age or older. The median age was 22 years. For every 100 females, there were 101.4 males. For every 100 females age 18 and over, there were 99.4 males.

The median income for a household in the CDP was $28,636, and the median income for a family was $26,641. Males had a median income of $20,809 versus $15,469 for females. The per capita income for the CDP was $7,294. About 36.2% of families and 41.1% of the population were below the poverty line, including 49.5% of those under age 18 and 9.5% of those age 65 or over.

== Education ==
Olivarez is served by the Weslaco Independent School District. Portions of the community are zoned to multiple elementary schools: "Rudy" Silva, Justice Gonzales, and Mario Ybarra. Two middle schools, Beatriz Garza and Mary Hoge, serve sections of Olivarez. Weslaco High School and Weslaco East High School serve sections of Olivarez.

In addition, South Texas Independent School District operates magnet schools that serve the community.
