= Texas State Highway 364 =

State highway in Texas

State Highway 364
- La Homa Road
- SH 364; highlighted in red

Route information
- Maintained by TxDOT
- Length: 6.27 mi (10.09 km)
- Existed: 2001–present

Major junctions
- South end: I-2 / US 83 in Palmview
- North end: FM 2221 near Alton

Location
- Country: United States
- State: Texas
- Counties: Hidalgo

Highway system
- Highways in Texas; Interstate; US; State; Former; Toll; Loops; Spurs; FM/RM; Park; Rec
← SH 363	→ SH 365

State Highway 364 (SH 364) is a south–north state highway that runs from Interstate 2/U.S. Highway 83 northward to Farm to Market Road 2221 in western Hidalgo County. The route was designated in 2001, replacing Farm to Market Road 2894.

== Route description ==
SH 364 begins in Palmview at a diamond interchange with I-2/US 83. The highway heads north from the interchange one block to an intersection with SH 495 (Griffin Parkway). The highway continues north through Hidalgo County to an intersection with FM 676. It reaches its northern terminus at an intersection with FM 2221 east of Citrus City.

== History ==
SH 364 was originally designated as FM 2894 on May 6, 1964, from FM 1924 to FM 2221. The route was redesignated on January 25, 2001, as SH 364 in 2001, and was extended south to connect with what is now Interstate 2/U.S. Route 83, replacing a portion of FM 495.

== Major intersections ==
The entire route is in Hidalgo County.

Location	mi	km	Destinations	Notes
Palmview	0.0	0.0	I-2 / US 83 (Frontage Road) / South La Homa Road – Laredo, Brownsville	Exit 133 on I-2/US 83.
Palmview	0.3	0.48	SH 495 east (Veterans Boulevard)	Western terminus of SH 495
	2.3	3.7	FM 1924 (3 Mile Road)	
	4.3	6.9	FM 676 (5 Mile Road)	
	6.3	10.1	FM 2221 (7 Mile Road) / La Homa Road	
1.000 mi = 1.609 km; 1.000 km = 0.621 mi
