= Edcouch, Texas =

- City
- Location of Edcouch, Texas
- Coordinates: 26°17′40″N 97°57′48″W
- Country: United States of America
- State: Texas
- County: Hidalgo

Area
  - Total: 1.03 sq mi (2.68 km^{2})
  - Land: 1.03 sq mi (2.68 km^{2})
  - Water: 0 sq mi (0.00 km^{2})
- Elevation: 59 ft (18 m)

Population (2020)
  - Total: 2,732
  - Density: 3,202.2/sq mi (1,236.37/km^{2})
- Time zone: UTC-6 (Central (CST))
  - Summer (DST): UTC-5 (CDT)
- ZIP code: 78538
- Area code: 956
- FIPS code: 48-22528
- GNIS feature ID: 1335079
- Website: cityofedcouch.org

Edcouch is a city in Hidalgo County, Texas, United States. As of the 2020 census, Edcouch had a population of 2,732. It is part of the McAllen–Edinburg–Mission and Reynosa–McAllen metropolitan areas. The town was founded in 1927 and named for Edward Couch, landowner and banker.

== Geography ==
Edcouch is located in eastern Hidalgo County at 26°17′40″N 97°57′48″W (26.294354, −97.963410), at the intersection of State Highway 107 and Farm to Market Road 1015. Its neighboring cities are Elsa to the west and La Villa to the east. Edcouch is 13 miles (21 km) east of Edinburg, the Hidalgo county seat, 22 miles (35 km) northeast of McAllen, and 20 miles (32 km) northwest of Harlingen.

According to the United States Census Bureau, the city of Edcouch has a total area of 1.0 square mile (2.7 km^{2}), all land.

== Demographics ==
Historical population
| Census | Pop. | Note | %± |
|---|---|---|---|
| 1930 | 914 | | — |
| 1940 | 1,758 | | 92.3% |
| 1950 | 2,925 | | 66.4% |
| 1960 | 2,814 | | −3.8% |
| 1970 | 2,656 | | −5.6% |
| 1980 | 3,092 | | 16.4% |
| 1990 | 2,878 | | −6.9% |
| 2000 | 3,342 | | 16.1% |
| 2010 | 3,161 | | −5.4% |
| 2020 | 2,732 | | −13.6% |
U.S. Decennial Census

=== 2020 census ===
As of the 2020 census, Edcouch had a population of 2,732. The median age was 34.6 years. 28.4% of residents were under the age of 18 and 15.7% of residents were 65 years of age or older. For every 100 females there were 91.0 males, and for every 100 females age 18 and over there were 89.0 males age 18 and over.

98.3% of residents lived in urban areas, while 1.7% lived in rural areas.

There were 820 households in Edcouch, of which 42.9% had children under the age of 18 living in them. Of all households, 45.1% were married-couple households, 16.2% were households with a male householder and no spouse or partner present, and 33.0% were households with a female householder and no spouse or partner present. About 17.7% of all households were made up of individuals and 8.7% had someone living alone who was 65 years of age or older. There were 956 housing units, of which 14.2% were vacant. The homeowner vacancy rate was 1.6% and the rental vacancy rate was 13.1%.

Racial composition as of the 2020 census
| Race | Number | Percent |
|---|---|---|
| White | 927 | 33.9% |
| Black or African American | 13 | 0.5% |
| American Indian and Alaska Native | 17 | 0.6% |
| Asian | 2 | 0.1% |
| Native Hawaiian and Other Pacific Islander | 0 | 0.0% |
| Some other race | 480 | 17.6% |
| Two or more races | 1,293 | 47.3% |
| Hispanic or Latino (of any race) | 2,655 | 97.2% |

=== 2000 census ===
At the 2000 census there were 3,342 people in 891 households, including 757 families, in the city. The population density was 3,573.9 inhabitants per square mile (1,379.9/km^{2}). There were 985 housing units at an average density of 1,053.3 per square mile (406.7/km^{2}). The racial makeup of the city was 76.33% White, 0.63% African American, 0.63% Native American, 19.84% from other races, and 2.57% from two or more races. Hispanic or Latino people of any race were 97.13%.

Of the 891 households 50.3% had children under the age of 18 living with them, 56.6% were married couples living together, 23.0% had a female householder with no husband present, and 15.0% were non-families. 13.7% of households were one person and 8.1% were one person aged 65 or older. The average household size was 3.75 and the average family size was 4.13.

The age distribution was 37.1% under the age of 18, 11.1% from 18 to 24, 25.2% from 25 to 44, 17.5% from 45 to 64, and 9.1% 65 or older. The median age was 26 years. For every 100 females, there were 93.5 males. For every 100 females age 18 and over, there were 87.2 males.

The median household income was $18,618 and the median family income was $20,208. Males had a median income of $18,708 versus $12,468 for females. The per capita income for the city was $6,096. About 43.4% of families and 48.1% of the population were below the poverty line, including 60.3% of those under age 18 and 37.6% of those age 65 or over.

== Education ==
Edcouch is served by the Edcouch-Elsa Independent School District. Edcouch residents are also allowed to apply to magnet schools operated by the South Texas Independent School District.
