= Valley Nature Center =

Nature preserve and park in Texas, U.S.

- Location within Texas
- Type: nature preserve, cactus garden
- Location: Gibson Park, Weslaco, Hidalgo County, Texas
- Coordinates: 26°9′33.05″N 97°59′49.7″W
- Area: 6 acres (2.4 ha)
- Created: 1984
- Open: Yes
- Website: www.valleynaturecenter.org

Valley Nature Center is a 6-acre park and nature preserve in Gibson City Park, Weslaco, Texas. Its focus is environmental education about the natural history of the Lower Rio Grande Valley.

The center's activities include a summer camp, weekly programs for all ages, birding trips, natural history classes and lectures. There are programs for individuals, children and adults. There is a native plant nursery with plants for sale, a conservation resource library and a gift shop.

== History ==
Valley Nature Center has been in operation as a non-profit organization since 1984 and a new building was opened in 2014. Formed from a vacant lot, the site now includes a 1-mile trail through a cactus garden, bog ponds, and butterfly garden.

== Fauna ==
Insects, birds and animals that have been seen include Malachite butterfly and Melanis pixe butterfly, plain chachalaca, green jays, great kiskadees, buff-bellied hummingbird, Texas tortoise, Texas horned lizard, and Eastern Cottontail Rabbit. The park is considered a good site to view migrating birds and butterflies.

== Botanical collection ==
Botanical collection includes species native to Sabal Palm Grove, Arroyo Colorado brush, the Barretal, Coastal Lomas, and the Chihuahuan Thorn forest also known as Rio Grande-Falcon thorn woodland.
