= Edcouch-Elsa Independent School District =

School district in Texas, United States

Address
- 920 West Santa Rosa Avenue Edcouch, Texas, USA ESC Region 1
- Coordinates: 26°17′39″N 97°58′35″W

District information
- Motto: Pride in Excellence!
- Grades: PK-12
- Established: 1929; 97 years ago
- Superintendent: Dr. Sandra Ochoa
- Governing agency: Texas Education Agency
- Schools: 8
- NCES District ID: 4818060

Students and staff
- Students: 4,167 (2025-2026)
- Athletic conference: UIL Class AAAAA
- District mascot: Yellow Jackets
- Colors: Black; Gold

Other information
- Website: www.eeisd.org

Edcouch-Elsa Independent School District (Edcouch-Elsa ISD or EEISD) is a public school district based in Edcouch, Texas, United States.

Covering approximately 28 square miles in Hidalgo County, the district serves the cities of Edcouch and Elsa, as well as portions of La Blanca, Laguna Seca, and Mila Doce census-designated places. The district also serves high school students from Monte Alto Independent School District.

As of 2026, Edcouch-Elsa ISD operates 7 campuses, including 1 high school, 2 middle schools, and 5 primary schools. The district most recently received a "D" rating from the Texas Education Agency (TEA).

== History ==
As of 1984, Edcouch-Elsa ISD had 4 schools: Edcouch-Elsa High School (grades 9-12), Central Junior High School (6-8), Edcouch Elementary School (K-5), and John F. Kennedy Elementary School (K-5).

In 1985, EEISD added Central Middle School (4-6) and renamed the CJHS to Edcouch-Elsa Junior High (7-8). The two elementary campuses then served grades PK-3.

Lyndon B. Johnson Elementary School (3-4) opened in 1989 and the district reconfigured its other primary campuses. Central MS moved to a 5-6 setup, with Edcouch ES and Kennedy ES housing grades PK-2.

With the opening of the Early Childhood Development Center (PK-K) in 2001, the district underwent another grade reconfiguration. EEJH added 6th grade (now 6-8), and the elementary schools all began to serve grades 1-5. Edcouch ES and Central MS were respectively renamed Santiago Garcia Elementary School and Ruben C. Rodriguez Elementary School.

The 6th Grade Campus opened in 2003, with EEJH reverting back to only grades 7-8. The ECDC was renamed to Jorge R. Gutierrez Early Childhood Center in 2005, with EEJH being renamed to Carlos Truan Junior High School in 2006. The 6th Grade Center became David Ybarra Middle School in 2007, and moved to a 5-6 configuration in 2008. This resulted in the four elementary campuses housing grades 1-4. This was temporary, as 5th grade returned to the elementary campuses in 2014 and the middle school returned to a 6th-only configuration.

In 2017, the middle school was closed due to unsafe conditions. 6th grade returned to the junior high and 5th grade went back to the elementary level. The facility was updated and reopened as David Ybarra Fine Arts Academy in 2020, again with only 6th graders. In 2025, the district closed this campus again due to budget constraints and 6th grade returned to the junior high, now Truan Middle School.

== Controversies ==
In November 1968, the Mexican-American Youth Organization (MAYO) organized a boycott of schools. MAYO demanded, among other things, eradication of the no-Spanish-use rule and to introduce Mexican American course content. This boycott legitimized MAYO activism in South Texas. After the school expelled 62 students, the newly founded Mexican American Legal Defense Fund (MALDEF) filed a lawsuit for the school's action. In December the court demanded the school reinstate the students as political protest is protected by the Constitution.

== Schools ==
=== Current Schools ===
Name	Grades	Established	Additional information
Edcouch-Elsa High School	9-12	1937	
Carlos F. Truan Middle School	6-8	1984	Previously Central Junior High in 1984-85, EE Junior High from 1985-2006, and Truan JH from 2006-25
Santiago Garcia Elementary School	1-5	Unknown	
John F. Kennedy Elementary School	1-5	Unknown	
Lyndon B. Johnson Elementary School	1-5	1989	
Ruben C. Rodriguez Elementary School	1-5	1985	Previously Central MS from 1985-2001
Jorge R. Gutierrez Early Childhood Center	PK-K	2001	Renamed from Early Childhood Development Center in 2005

=== Former Schools ===
Name	Opened	Closed	Additional information
P.F.C. David Ybarra Fine Arts Academy	2003	2025	Previously 6th Grade Center and Middle School; temporarily closed from 2017-2020
