= Villa Verde, Texas =

- Census-designated place
- Coordinates: 26°7′58″N 97°59′48″W
- Country: United States of America
- State: Texas
- County: Hidalgo

Area
  - Total: 0.39 sq mi (1.0 km^{2})
  - Land: 0.39 sq mi (1.0 km^{2})
  - Water: 0 sq mi (0.0 km^{2})
- Elevation: 75 ft (23 m)

Population (2020)
  - Total: 711
  - Density: 1,800/sq mi (710/km^{2})
- Time zone: UTC-6 (Central (CST))
  - Summer (DST): UTC-5 (CDT)
- FIPS code: 48-75626
- GNIS feature ID: 1852779

Villa Verde is a census-designated place (CDP) in Hidalgo County, Texas. The population was 711 at the 2020 United States Census. It is part of the McAllen–Edinburg–Mission Metropolitan Statistical Area.

== Geography ==
Villa Verde is located at 26°7′58″N 97°59′48″W (26.132701, -97.996785).

According to the United States Census Bureau, the CDP has a total area of 0.4 square miles (1.0 km^{2}), all land.

== Demographics ==
Historical population
Census	Pop.	Note	%±
2000	891		—
2010	874		−1.9%
2020	711		−18.6%
U.S. Decennial Census; 1850–1900 1910; 1920 1930 1940; 1950 1960 1970; 1980 1990 2000; 2010 2020

Villa Verde first appeared as a census designated place in the 2000 U.S. census.

=== 2020 census ===
Villa Verde CDP, Texas – Racial and ethnic composition Note: the US Census treats Hispanic/Latino as an ethnic category. This table excludes Latinos from the racial categories and assigns them to a separate category. Hispanics/Latinos may be of any race.
Race / Ethnicity (NH = Non-Hispanic)	Pop 2000	Pop 2010	Pop 2020	% 2000	% 2010	% 2020
White alone (NH)	26	31	17	2.92%	3.55%	2.39%
Black or African American alone (NH)	4	2	0	0.45%	0.23%	0.00%
Native American or Alaska Native alone (NH)	0	0	0	0.00%	0.00%	0.00%
Asian alone (NH)	0	6	3	0.00%	0.69%	0.42%
Native Hawaiian or Pacific Islander alone (NH)	0	0	0	0.00%	0.00%	0.00%
Other race alone (NH)	0	0	3	0.00%	0.00%	0.42%
Mixed race or Multiracial (NH)	0	3	0	0.00%	0.34%	0.00%
Hispanic or Latino (any race)	861	832	688	96.63%	95.19%	96.77%
Total	891	874	711	100.00%	100.00%	100.00%

As of the census of 2000, there were 891 people, 216 households, and 200 families residing in the CDP. The population density was 2,367.8 inhabitants per square mile (914.2/km^{2}). There were 228 housing units at an average density of 605.9 per square mile (233.9/km^{2}). The racial makeup of the CDP was 64.20% White, 0.45% African American, 31.54% from other races, and 3.82% from two or more races. Hispanic or Latino of any race were 96.63% of the population.

There were 216 households, out of which 53.2% had children under the age of 18 living with them, 73.1% were married couples living together, 14.8% had a female householder with no husband present, and 7.4% were non-families. 6.5% of all households were made up of individuals, and 3.2% had someone living alone who was 65 years of age or older. The average household size was 4.13 and the average family size was 4.30.

In the CDP, the population was spread out, with 37.6% under the age of 18, 11.6% from 18 to 24, 27.6% from 25 to 44, 18.0% from 45 to 64, and 5.3% who were 65 years of age or older. The median age was 26 years. For every 100 females, there were 96.7 males. For every 100 females age 18 and over, there were 89.8 males.

The median income for a household in the CDP was $22,768, and the median income for a family was $22,857. Males had a median income of $14,932 versus $14,107 for females. The per capita income for the CDP was $5,659. About 36.3% of families and 34.9% of the population were below the poverty line, including 47.5% of those under age 18 and 13.5% of those age 65 or over.

== Education ==
Villa Verde is served by the Weslaco Independent School District. It is zoned to Memorial Elementary School, Central Middle School, and Weslaco High School.

In addition, South Texas Independent School District operates magnet schools that serve the community.
