= Chuck Leah =

American musician

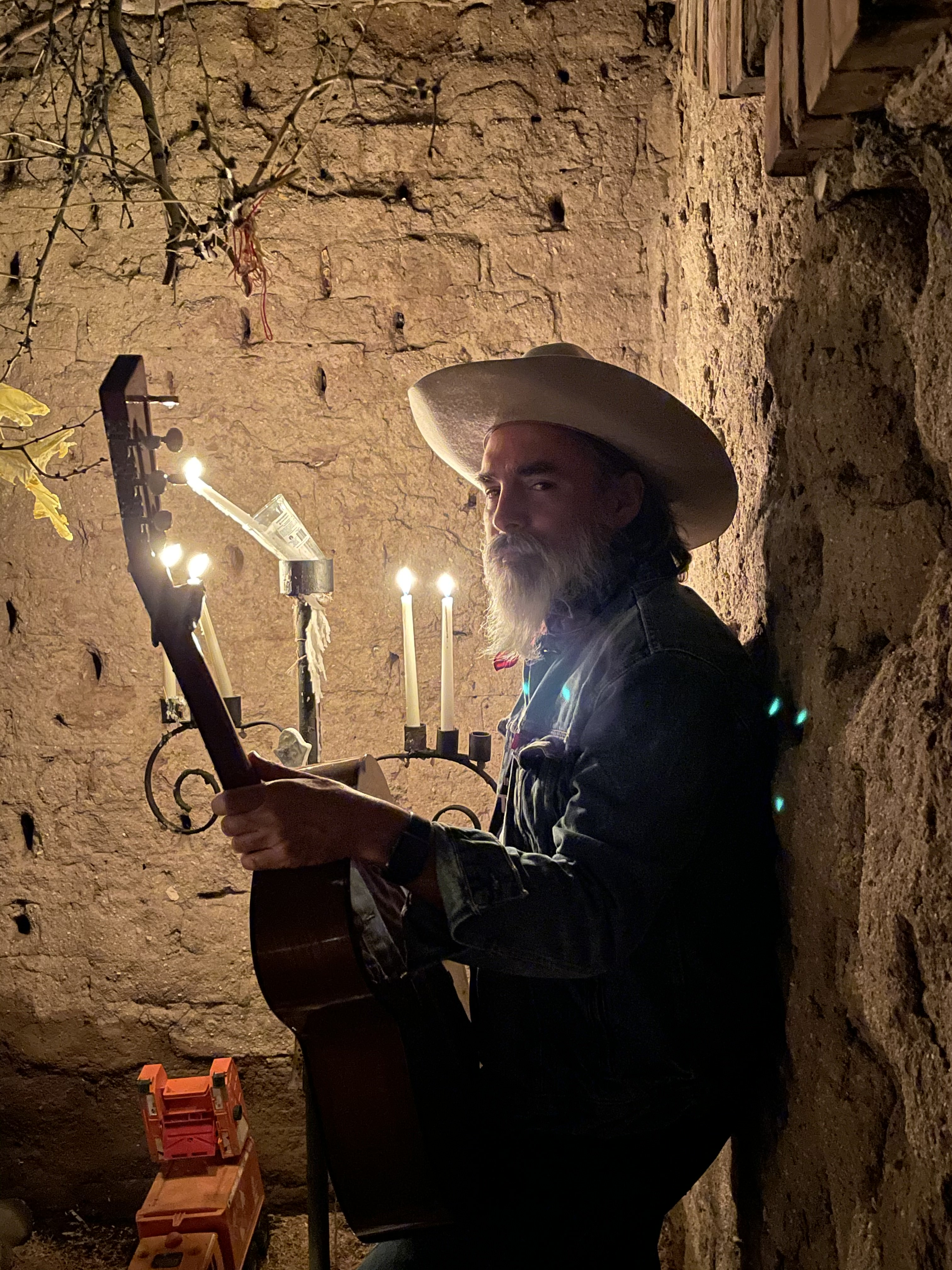

Background information
- Born: October 18, 1972 (age 54); Weslaco, Texas, US
- Genre: Folk-rock · Folk · Americana · Blues
- Occupation: Musician · Singer · Songwriter · Record producer
- Instrument: Bass guitar · Vocals · Guitar · Mandolin
- Label: Dos Pistolas Records · Blue Hour Music
- Website: chuckleah.com

Chuck Leah is a Grammy-nominated singer, songwriter, multi-instrumentalist, and record producer. His seven studio albums span genres that include folk-rock, folk, Americana, and depression-era blues. His main instruments include electric, acoustic, and bass guitar, mandolin, organ, and keyboard.

Leah was born in the small town of Weslaco, Texas on October 18, 1972. He began playing music by the time he was three or four years old. Leah recorded for the first time around the age of 10, getting his start playing bass for various Texas bands.

Beginning in the 1980s, Leah toured with and played bass for a number of bands and artists. In the 1990s, Leah played in the American country-rock band Tumbleweed. Later in the 2000s, Leah began to work with the Minnesotan group Traveled Ground as producer and musician. Leah has lived and worked in Italy, Los Angeles, Nashville, Austin, Puerto Rico, Minneapolis, and Houston.

Leah recorded his album, High Stakes, in Minneapolis, Minnesota in 2015. High Stakes was produced by Leah, musician and composer Jeff Victor, and sound engineer Evan Bakke, whose credits include Prince, Hippo Campus, Daru Jones, and Sam Nitsch.

In 2019, Leah composed and performed an original, live score for the Houston Museum of Natural Science’s presentation of the 1922 silent film Nosferatu.

In 2020, Leah recorded and released his seventh album, Band of Ghosts, at the Power Station New England in Waterford, Connecticut. The album's name is, in part, a reference to its recording process: due to COVID-19, recording sessions were socially distanced, with each musician recording alone in the studio. Leah's ensemble for Band of Ghosts included Jeff Victor, Soul Asylum’s Jeremy Tappero, singer Jenn Bostic, Sam Nitsch and bassist Michael Visceglia. The album was also produced by Chuck Leah and Evan Bakke, through their record label Dos Pistolas.

Through the Blue Hour Music/Dos Pistolas record labels, Leah and Bakke co-produced Wangden Sherpa's 2022 debut album, Tangled in You. Leah also arranged, co-wrote, and played acoustic, 12-string, and bass guitar for the album.

In 2026, Leah's song "Coyote" was nominated for a Grammy Award for Best American Roots Performance taking place at the 69th Annual Grammy Awards in 2027. The LA Times wrote, "“Coyote” is perhaps Leah’s most poetically brilliant and interesting musical adventure yet. A haunting and engaging chant is enhanced by the track’s melodic guitars as Leah’s storytelling lyrics again demonstrate mastery of his songwriting prowess."

== Discography ==
| Year | Album | Label |
|---|---|---|
| 2006 | Drive | |
| 2015 | The Gypsy Kind | Sugarbush Music |
| 2016 | High Stakes | Revolution Baby Records |
| 2020 | Band of Ghosts | Blue Hour Music/Dos Pistolas |
| 2026 | A Necessary Evil | Blue Hour Music/Dos Pistolas |
