= Weslaco High School =

Public school in Texas, United States

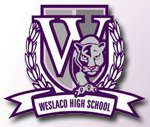

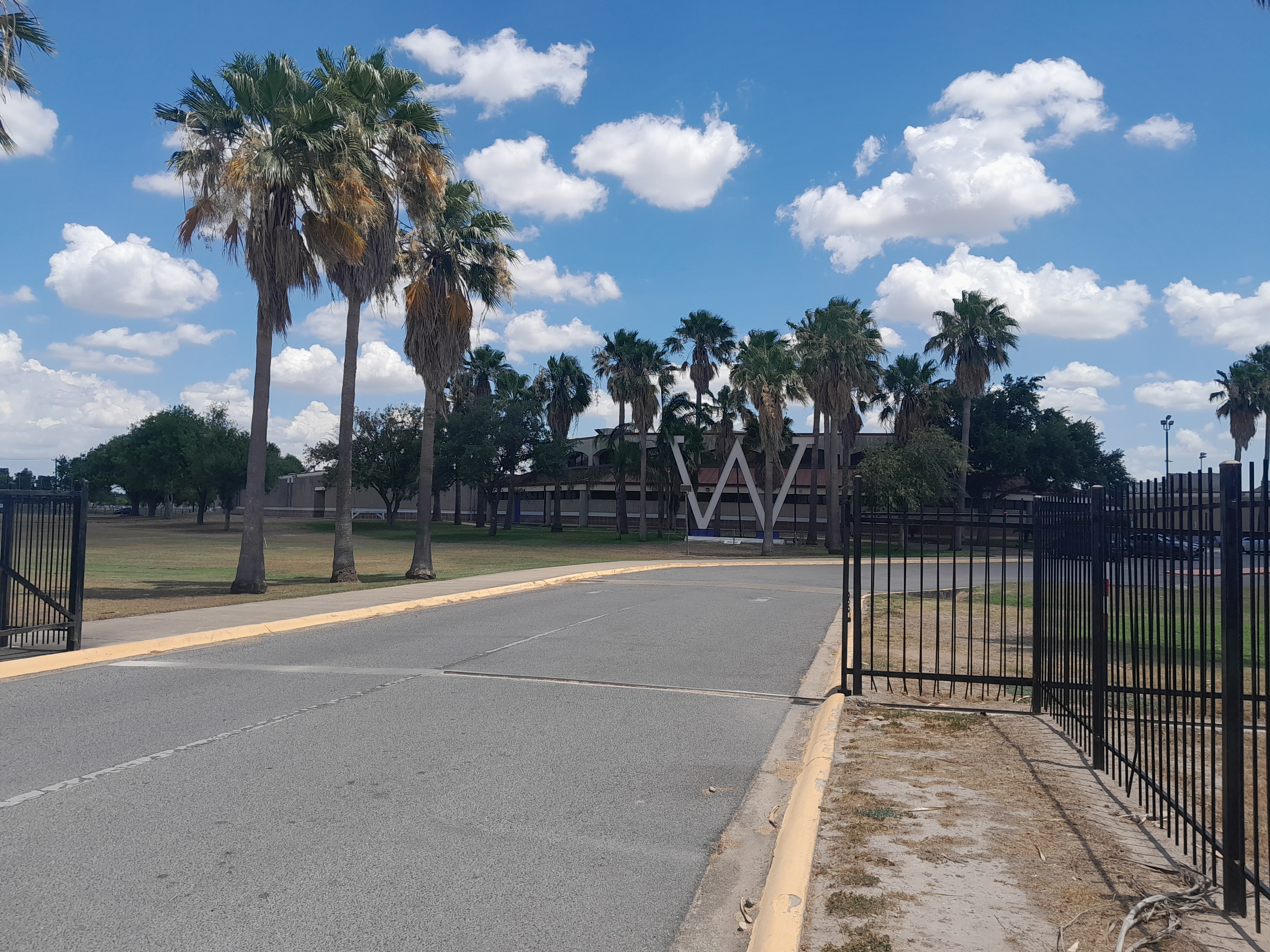
- An entrance of Weslaco High School

Location
- 1005 W Pike Blvd; Weslaco, (Hidalgo County), Texas 78596; United States
- Coordinates: 26.168939°N 98.002596°W

Information
- School type: Public High School
- Established: 1921; 105 years ago 1973 (current location)
- NCES District ID: 4844960
- Superintendent: Richard Rivera
- NCES School ID: 484496005125
- Principal: Enrique Ornelas
- Teaching staff: 162.62 (FTE) (Note: 2023-2024 school year)
- Grades: 9–12
- Enrollment: 2,707 (2023-2024)
- Average class size: 30
- Student to teacher ratio: 16.65
- Campus: Large Suburb
- Colors: Purple; White
- Slogan: Go! Fight! Win! Hard Work Pays Off
- Fight song: National Emblem March
- Sports: Baseball, Basketball, Cross Country, Football, Golf, Powerlifting, Soccer, Swimming & Diving, Tennis, Track & Field, Cheerleading, Softball, Volleyball, Wrestling
- Mascot: Panther
- Rival: Weslaco East High School
- Publication: Hi-Life Magazine
- Yearbook: La Palma
- Website: whs.wisd.us

Weslaco High School is a four-year public secondary school the Weslaco Independent School District in Weslaco, Texas. It was founded in 1921, the same year that the school district was established after successful petitioning to separate from nearby city Donna and their district. Upon construction of the full time building (located on the corner of South Iowa Avenue and 7th Street) in 1923, the building was utilized for decades as the major high school until 1973. The current building on Pike Boulevard was built in 1973 while the old high school and junior high buildings were eventually preserved and utilized for one of Weslaco's middle schools. Weslaco High remained the only major high school in Weslaco until the construction of Weslaco East High School in the fall of 2000, although Weslaco High housed senior students until the 2003-2004 school year. For the 2009–2010 school year, Weslaco High School was a TEA "Recognized" School. The high school has won one state championship, doing so on June 1, 2024 when they won the UIL 6A Softball Championship Game.

Weslaco High serves the following areas: Much of Weslaco, Villa Verde, half of Olivarez, the WISD portion of Midway South, the WISD portion of Midway North, and a section of the WISD portion of Mila Doce.

== Music department ==
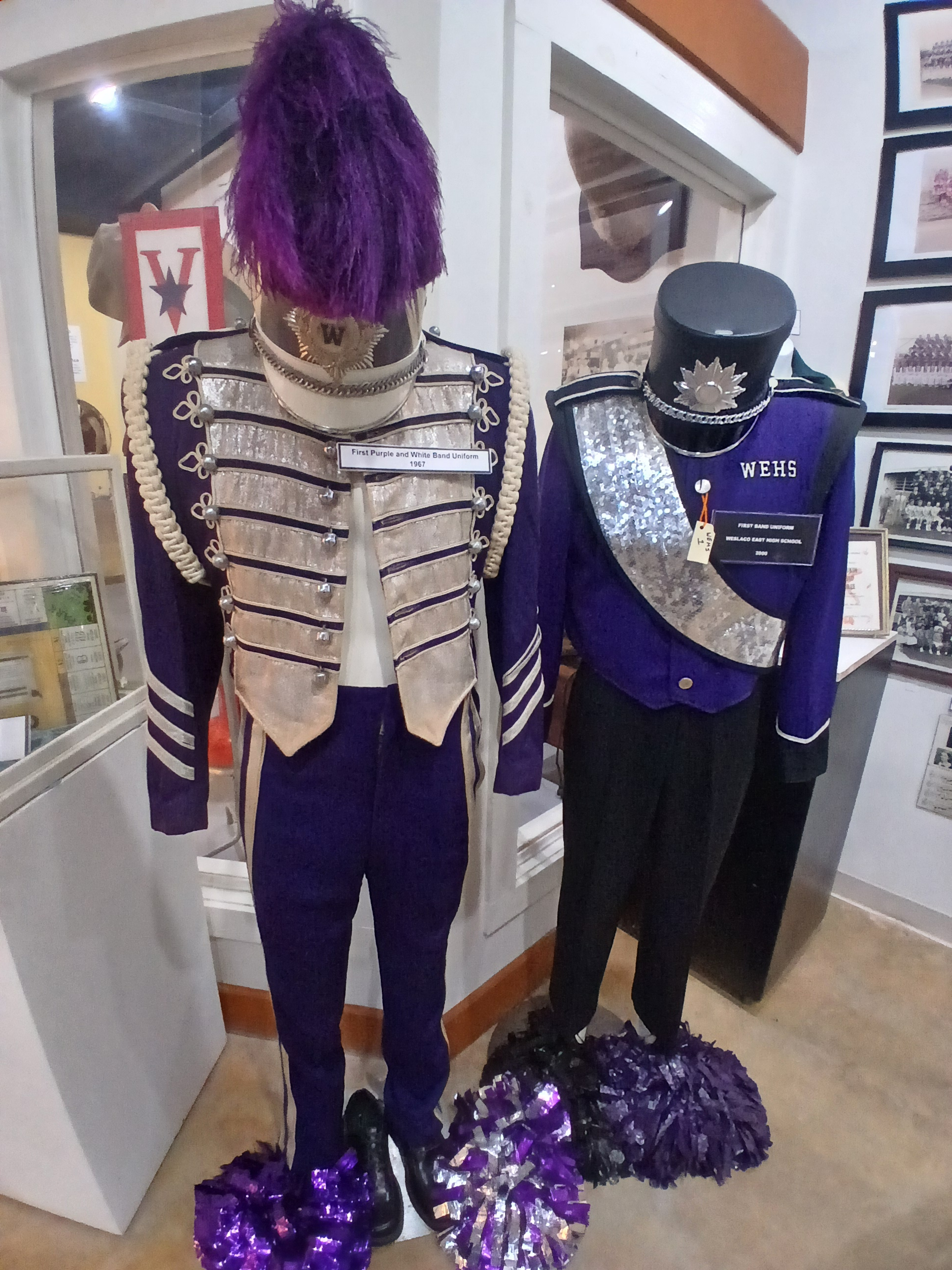
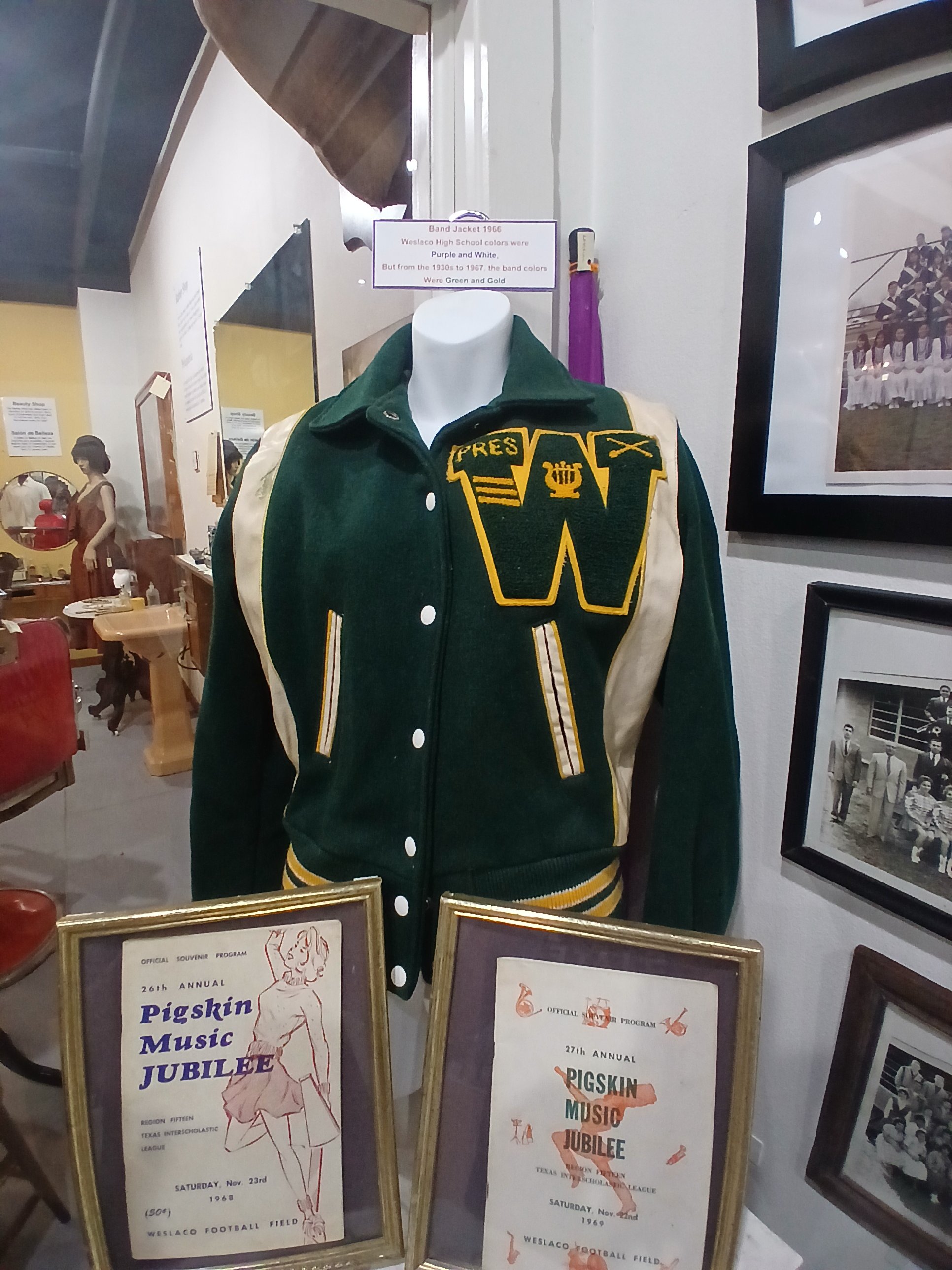
A display of the first WHS Uniform in purple, created in 1967. Three decades later, the second Weslaco school would also use purple for their band uniform (left). For three decades prior to 1967, the school used green and gold for jackets and band (right).

The marching band of Weslaco High is the Weslaco Panther Corps. From 1932 to 1967, the colors of the Corps were green and gold (due to acquiring old band uniforms of Baylor University), but it was eventually changed to Dark Purple and White to accommodate the colors of the high school.

Another department within Weslaco High is the Weslaco High Orchestra. No main colors are sported in this group, but purple is the main color over all groups and clubs within the school itself.

== Athletics ==
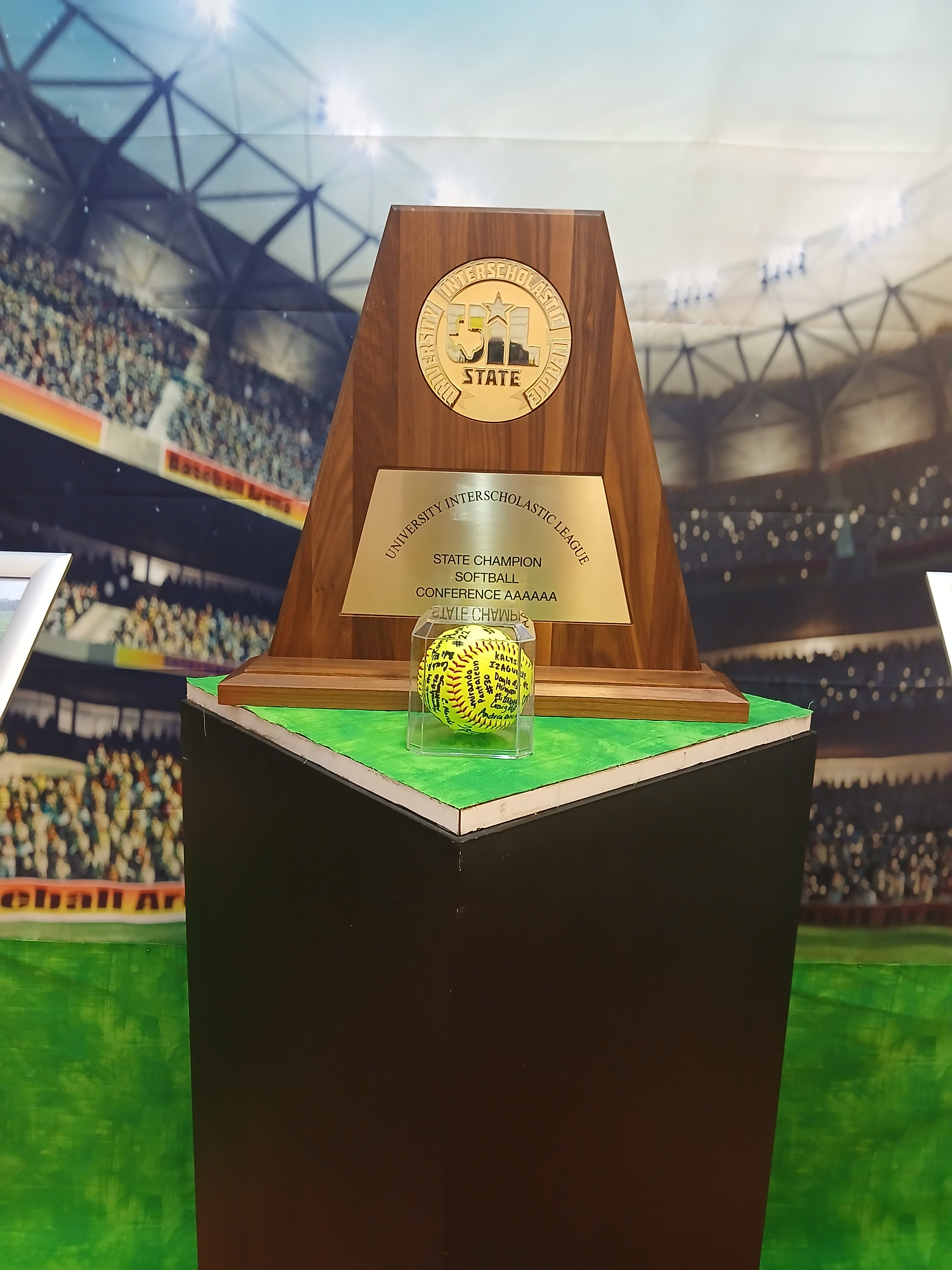
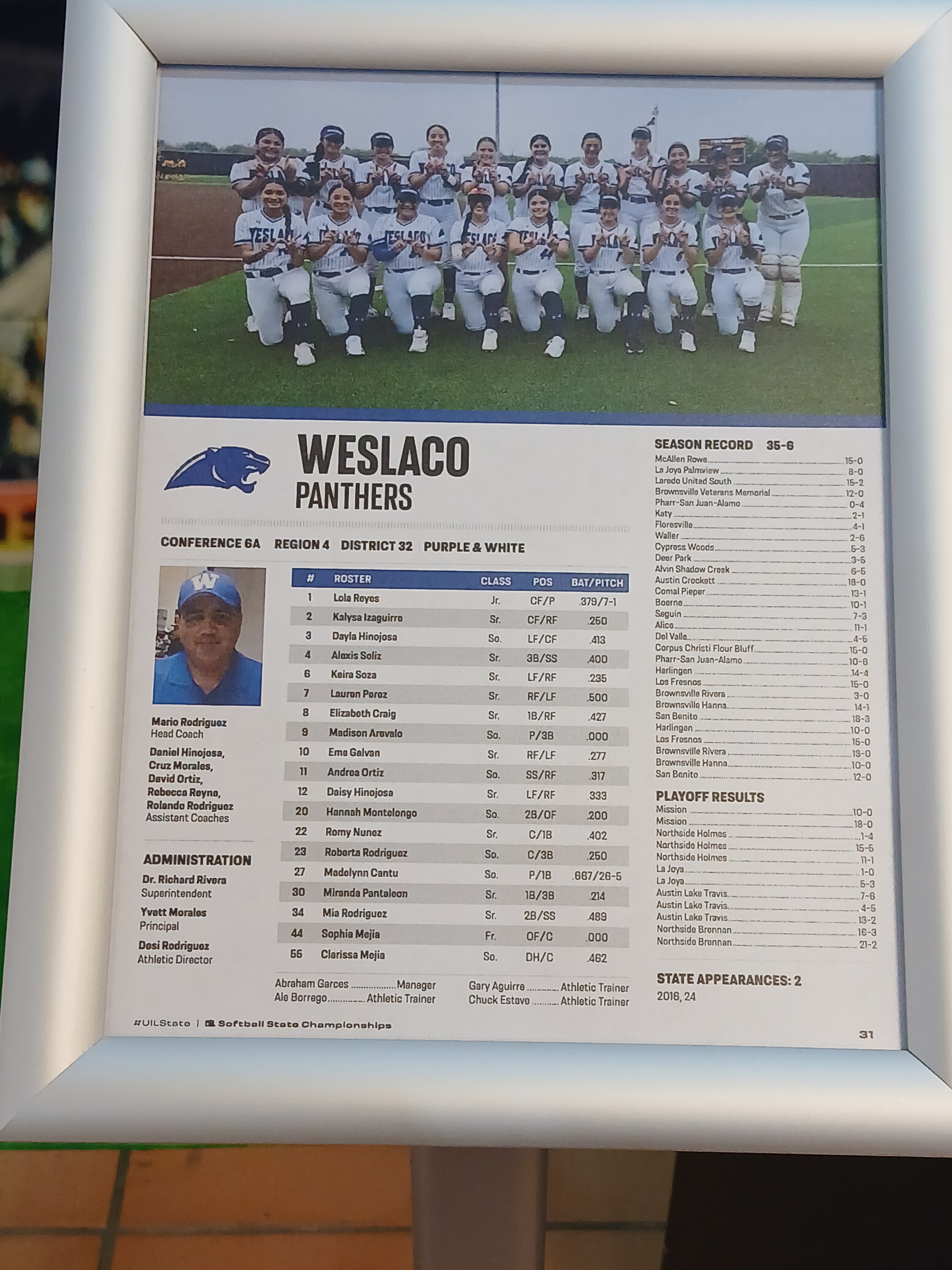
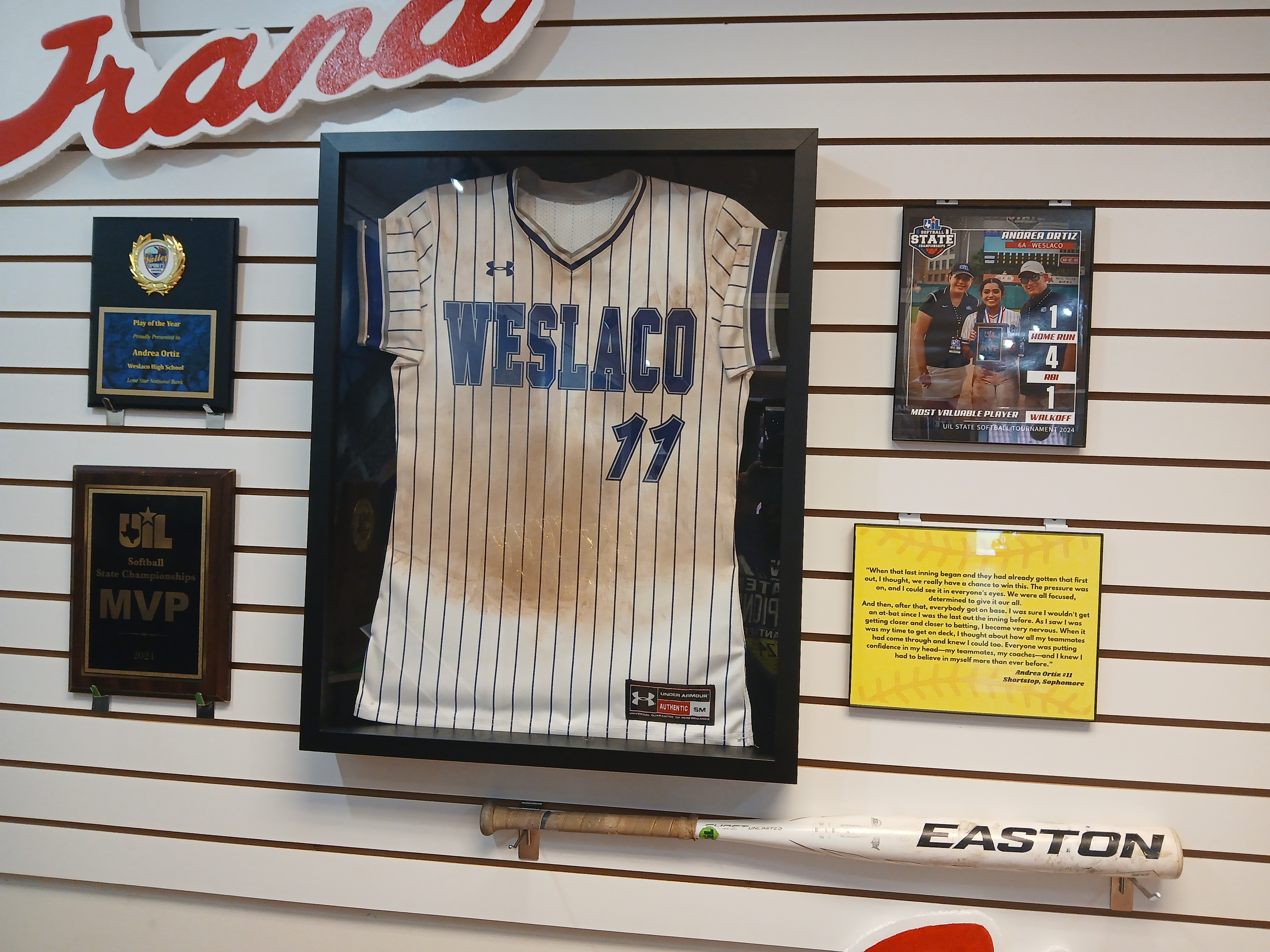
A display of images from the 2023-2024 UIL state champion Weslaco Panthers (the first UIL champion in school history) from the Weslaco Museum in September 2024. The championship ball, as signed by players from the team along the UIL trophy was put on display (left) to go with a listing detailing their schedule and roster (center) and a jersey from their walkoff hitter in Andrea Ortiz (right).

In 1955, the football team went 13-1 under head coach Martin Stuart and made the state class 2A semifinals (the sixth team from the Rio Grande Valley to do so); they beat Sinton 27-14, Floresville 27-20 and Nederland 41-14 before losing against Hillsboro 20-7. It is still the only time the Panthers have reached the state semifinals.

The softball team has reached the UIL State semifinal twice, doing so in 2016 and 2024. In 2024, they advanced all the way to the 6A State Championship game, becoming the second team from the Valley to compete for the honor. On June 1, they defeated Waco Midway 11-9 on a walkoff grand slam by Andrea Ortiz after being down 9-3 in their last inning to win their first ever state championship but also the first UIL state softball championship for the Valley region.

== Bobby Lackey Stadium ==
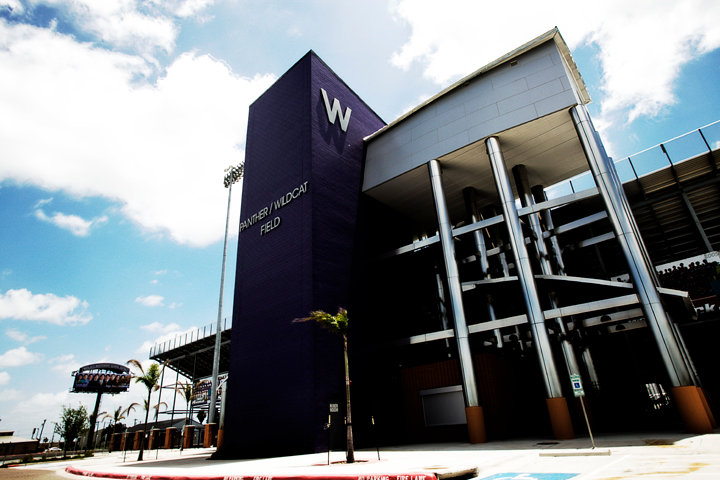
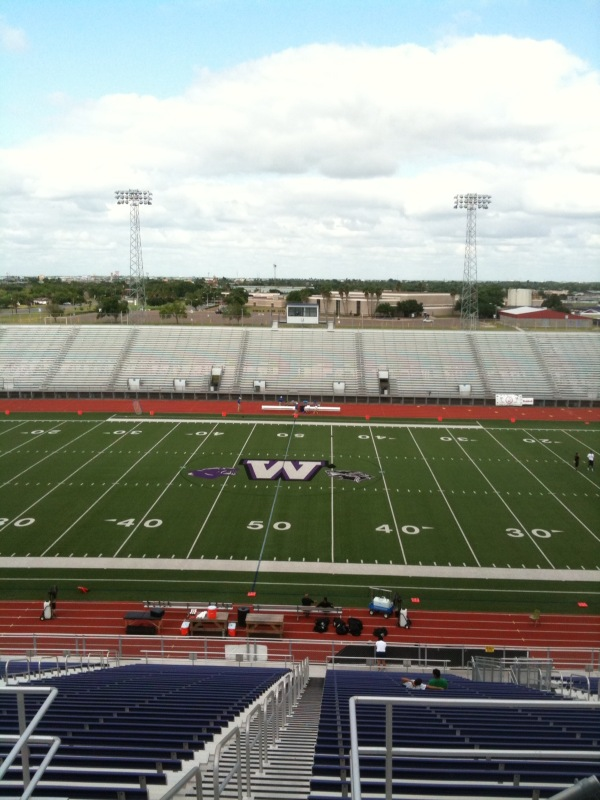
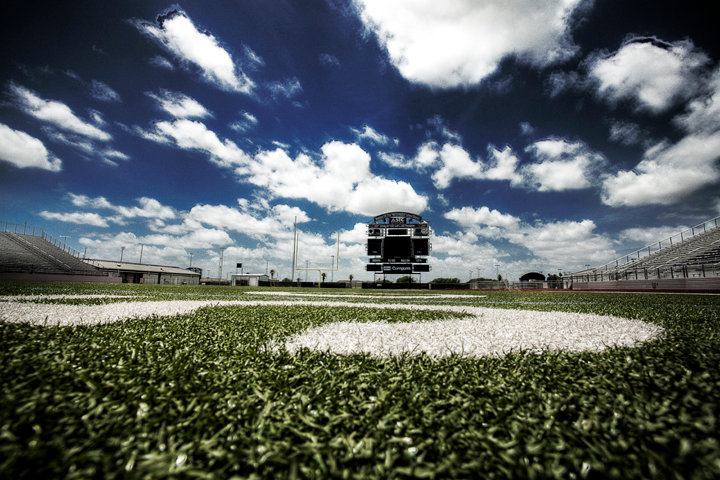
Bobby Lackey Stadium and its field

From 1973 to 1989 the football stadium was named Barbee Nehaus Stadium. In 1990, a new Weslaco High stadium was built and named Panther Stadium. In recognition of one of Weslaco High's most famous students, the stadium was renamed Bobby Lackey Stadium in the summer of 2002. From 2002 onward, the 15,000-capacity Bobby Lackey Stadium (also known as Blackey stadium) has served both Weslaco High School and Weslaco East High School.

In May 2009, renovation of the stadium began to increase seating capacity as well as adding various new features to the Stadium costing an estimate of $7 million. The home side seating serves 7,100 fans with approximately 1,000 seats with purple VIP backrest seating accommodations. The visitor side bleacher seating serves approximately 6,300 fans. The lower level of the press box incorporates home and visitor independent ticket booth sales. The exterior façade has distinct arches over the first floor, thus also serving as protection to the fans from the elements.

== Notable alumni ==
- Tom Barker, former NBA basketball player
- Harlon Block, flag raiser on Iwo Jima, World War II. He led the Panther Football Team to the Conference Championship and was an "All South Texas End.
- Richard Cortez, former mayor of McAllen, Texas.
- Pat Hingle, actor
- Bobby Lackey, former American football quarterback for the Texas Longhorns
- RAUL A. GONZALEZ Texas Supreme Court, Justice-1st Hispanic, 1984-1999; graduated Weslaco High 1959.
- Rene Javier González, 1960 Weslaco High Graduate; Superior Court Judge, 1984- 2001, Anchorage Alaska.

== See also ==
- Secondary education
- Secondary school
- Secondary education by country
- List of education articles by country
- List of schools by country
