= List of highways numbered 493 =

The following highways are numbered 493:

== Japan ==
- Japan National Route 493

== United States ==
- LA 493
- MD 493
- PR-493
- FM 493

| Preceded by 492 | Lists of highways 493 | Succeeded by 494 |
