= La Villa Independent School District =

School district in Texas, United States

Address
- 500 East 9th Street La Villa, Texas, 78562; United States

District information
- Grades: PK–12
- Schools: 3
- NCES District ID: 4826340

Students and staff
- Students: 538 (2023–2024)
- Teachers: 53.38 (on an FTE basis)
- Student–teacher ratio: 10.08:1

Other information
- Website: www.lavillaisd.org

La Villa Independent School District is a public school district based in La Villa, Texas (USA).

In addition to La Villa, the district serves most of the unincorporated census-designated place of Laguna Seca.

In 2009, the school district was rated "academically acceptable" by the Texas Education Agency.

In January 2014 the district had 625 students. During that month, shortly after the end of the winter holiday, because La Villa ISD refused to pay the City of La Villa's increased surcharge rate, the city shut off water and sewer services to the schools. They were forced to temporarily close.

== Schools ==
- La Villa Early College High School (Grades 9–12)
- La Villa Middle School (Grades 6–8)
- Jose Bernabe Munoz Elementary School (Grades PK-5)
