= Mila Doce, Texas =

- Census-designated place
- Coordinates: 26°13′16″N 97°57′42″W
- Country: United States of America
- State: Texas
- County: Hidalgo

Area
  - Total: 3.3 sq mi (8.5 km^{2})
  - Land: 3.3 sq mi (8.5 km^{2})
  - Water: 0 sq mi (0.0 km^{2})
- Elevation: 59 ft (18 m)

Population (2020)
  - Total: 6,162
  - Density: 1,900/sq mi (720/km^{2})
- Time zone: UTC-6 (Central (CST))
  - Summer (DST): UTC-5 (CDT)
- FIPS code: 48-48320
- GNIS feature ID: 1867555

Mila Doce ("Mile Twelve" in Spanish, from the name of the road it adjoins) is a census-designated place (CDP) in Hidalgo County, Texas, United States. The population was 6,162 at the 2020 United States Census. It is part of the McAllen–Edinburg–Mission Metropolitan Statistical Area.

== Geography ==
Mila Doce is located at 26°13′16″N 97°57′42″W (26.221238, -97.961795).

According to the United States Census Bureau, the CDP has a total area of 3.3 square miles (8.5 km^{2}), all land.

== Demographics ==
Historical population
Census	Pop.	Note	%±
1990	4,477		—
2000	4,907		9.6%
2010	6,222		26.8%
2020	6,162		−1.0%
U.S. Decennial Census; 1850–1900 1910; 1920 1930 1940; 1950 1960 1970; 1980 1990 2000; 2010 2020

Mila Doce first appeared as a census designated place in the 1990 U.S. census.

=== 2020 census ===
Mila Doce CDP, Texas – Racial and ethnic composition Note: the US Census treats Hispanic/Latino as an ethnic category. This table excludes Latinos from the racial categories and assigns them to a separate category. Hispanics/Latinos may be of any race.
Race / Ethnicity (NH = Non-Hispanic)	Pop 2000	Pop 2010	Pop 2020	% 2000	% 2010	% 2020
White alone (NH)	22	67	88	0.45%	1.08%	1.43%
Black or African American alone (NH)	0	0	2	0.00%	0.00%	0.03%
Native American or Alaska Native alone (NH)	1	1	4	0.02%	0.02%	0.06%
Asian alone (NH)	0	1	1	0.00%	0.02%	0.02%
Native Hawaiian or Pacific Islander alone (NH)	0	0	0	0.00%	0.00%	0.00%
Other race alone (NH)	0	0	15	0.00%	0.00%	0.24%
Mixed race or Multiracial (NH)	0	0	5	0.00%	0.00%	0.08%
Hispanic or Latino (any race)	4,884	6,153	6,047	99.53%	98.89%	98.13%
Total	4,907	6,222	6,162	100.00%	100.00%	100.00%

As of the census of 2000, there were 4,907 people, 1,020 households, and 974 families residing in the CDP. The population density was 1,492.2 inhabitants per square mile (576.1/km^{2}). There were 1,147 housing units at an average density of 348.8 per square mile (134.7/km^{2}). The racial makeup of the CDP was 94.74% White, 0.20% Native American, 4.26% from other races, and 0.79% from two or more races. Hispanic or Latino of any race were 99.53% of the population. Mila Doce has the highest percentage of Hispanics among United States census-designated places.

There were 1,020 households, out of which 70.1% had children under the age of 18 living with them, 76.6% were married couples living together, 14.8% had a female householder with no husband present, and 4.5% were non-families. 3.9% of all households were made up of individuals, and 1.6% had someone living alone who was 65 years of age or older. The average household size was 4.81 and the average family size was 4.89.

In the CDP, the population was spread out, with 43.9% under the age of 18, 14.2% from 18 to 24, 25.9% from 25 to 44, 12.4% from 45 to 64, and 3.6% who were 65 years of age or older. The median age was 21 years. For every 100 females, there were 96.2 males. For every 100 females age 18 and over, there were 93.8 males.

The median income for a household in the CDP was $15,944, and the median income for a family was $16,716. Males had a median income of $15,828 versus $15,025 for females. The per capita income for the CDP was $4,221. About 59.1% of families and 66.2% of the population were below the poverty line, including 72.9% of those under age 18 and 62.0% of those age 65 or over.

== Education ==
Most of Mila Doce is served by the Weslaco Independent School District. Portions of the community are zoned to multiple WISD elementary schools: Justice Gonzales, Mario Ybarra, North Bridge, "Tony" Rico, and Airport Drive. Two middle schools, Mary Hoge and Central, serve WISD sections of Mila Doce. Weslaco East High School and Weslaco High School serve WISD sections of Mila Doce.

A small portion is zoned to the Edcouch-Elsa Independent School District. The schools in grades 6-12 serving the section are: P.F.C. David Ybarra Middle School, Carlos F. Truan Junior High School, and Edcouch Elsa High School.

In addition, South Texas Independent School District operates magnet schools that serve the community.
