= Laguna Seca, Texas =

- Census-designated place
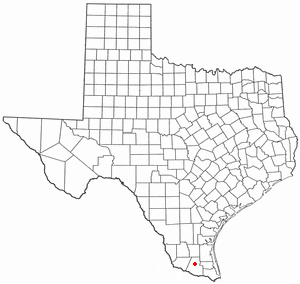
- Location of Laguna Seca, Texas

- Coordinates: 26°16′41″N 97°55′28″W
- Country: United States of America
- State: Texas
- County: Hidalgo

Area
  - Total: 2.2 sq mi (5.8 km^{2})
  - Land: 2.2 sq mi (5.8 km^{2})
  - Water: 0 sq mi (0.0 km^{2})
- Elevation: 105 ft (32 m)

Population (2020)
  - Total: 232
  - Density: 100/sq mi (40/km^{2})
- Time zone: UTC-6 (Central (CST))
  - Summer (DST): UTC-5 (CDT)
- FIPS code: 48-40320
- GNIS feature ID: 1378550

Laguna Seca is a census-designated place (CDP) in Hidalgo County, Texas, United States. The population was 232 at the 2020 United States Census. It is part of the McAllen–Edinburg–Mission Metropolitan Statistical Area.

== Geography ==
Laguna Seca is located at 26°16′41″N 97°55′28″W (26.278125, -97.924395).

According to the United States Census Bureau, the CDP has a total area of 2.2 square miles (5.7 km^{2}), all land.

== History ==
The Laguna Seca Ranch was initially established in the year 1867 by Macedonio Vela Senior and his wife Mercedes Chapa Cantu. Approximately ten years earlier, Macedonio Vela Senior fled from Mexico to escape the wave of executions associated with the War of Reform. In 1867, he purchased one square league (4,428 acres (18 km^{2})) of the Santa Anita Land Grant from John and Salome Balli McAllen.

In the decade spanning 1880 to 1890, he acquired more adjacent real estate holdings to yield a ranch over 75,000 acres (300 km^{2}) in extent; during this decade he grazed cattle, horses, and mules, and became an exporter of donkeys to Cuba. The first citrus trees in Hidalgo County were planted within the ranch property. Vela's grandson, Reynaldo Vela, discovered an artesian well which supplies a lake of approximately 5 acres (20,000 m^{2}) in size, which lake was historically and inexplicably called Dry Lake. In the year 1975, a historical marker was placed at the ranch. In recent times family members manage the ranch holding, although it is subdivided into three tangent parcels.

In 1871, Vela's daughter, Carlota, grew the first orange trees in Hidalgo County from the seeds of a fruit given her by a traveling priest. This is now an important citrus-producing area. The ranch had grown to 80,000 acres (320 km^{2}) when a school was built here in 1892. Delfina Post Office, named for another one of Vela's daughters, was opened in 1893 and a Catholic church in 1894. Laguna Seca Ranch is still owned by the Vela family. (1975) A historic cemetery exists on the ranch property.

== Demographics ==
Historical population
Census	Pop.	Note	%±
2000	251		—
2010	266		6.0%
2020	232		−12.8%
U.S. Decennial Census; 1850–1900 1910; 1920 1930 1940; 1950 1960 1970; 1980 1990 2000; 2010 2020

Laguna Seca first appeared as a census designated place in the 2000 U.S. census.

=== 2020 census ===
Laguna Seca CDP, Texas – Racial and ethnic composition Note: the US Census treats Hispanic/Latino as an ethnic category. This table excludes Latinos from the racial categories and assigns them to a separate category. Hispanics/Latinos may be of any race.
Race / Ethnicity (NH = Non-Hispanic)	Pop 2000	Pop 2010	Pop 2020	% 2000	% 2010	% 2020
White alone (NH)	3	3	3	1.20%	1.13%	1.29%
Black or African American alone (NH)	0	0	3	0.00%	0.00%	1.29%
Native American or Alaska Native alone (NH)	0	0	0	0.00%	0.00%	0.00%
Asian alone (NH)	0	0	0	0.00%	0.00%	0.00%
Native Hawaiian or Pacific Islander alone (NH)	0	0	0	0.00%	0.00%	0.00%
Other race alone (NH)	0	0	0	0.00%	0.00%	0.00%
Mixed race or Multiracial (NH)	0	0	1	0.00%	0.00%	0.43%
Hispanic or Latino (any race)	248	263	225	98.80%	98.87%	96.98%
Total	251	266	232	100.00%	100.00%	100.00%

As of the census of 2000, there were 251 people, 68 households, and 62 families residing in the CDP. The population density was 111.4 inhabitants per square mile (43.0/km^{2}). There were 75 housing units at an average density of 33.3 per square mile (12.9/km^{2}). The racial makeup of the CDP was 75.70% White, 0.40% African American, 3.19% Native American, 19.92% from other races, and 0.80% from two or more races. Hispanic or Latino of any race were 98.80% of the population.

There were 68 households, out of which 36.8% had children under the age of 18 living with them, 67.6% were married couples living together, 17.6% had a female householder with no husband present, and 7.4% were non-families. 4.4% of all households were made up of individuals, and 1.5% had someone living alone who was 65 years of age or older. The average household size was 3.69 and the average family size was 3.84.

In the CDP, the population was spread out, with 34.3% under the age of 18, 7.2% from 18 to 24, 27.1% from 25 to 44, 18.3% from 45 to 64, and 13.1% who were 65 years of age or older. The median age was 30 years. For every 100 females, there were 112.7 males. For every 100 females age 18 and over, there were 98.8 males.

The median income for a household in the CDP was $29,063, and the median income for a family was $30,000. Males had a median income of $28,750 versus $20,250 for females. The per capita income for the CDP was $9,282. About 26.1% of families and 37.1% of the population were below the poverty line, including 29.5% of those under the age of eighteen and 52.2% of those 65 or over.

== Education ==
The majority of Laguna Seca is in the La Villa Independent School District, while the remainder is served by the Edcouch-Elsa Independent School District.

In addition, South Texas Independent School District operates magnet schools that serve the community.
