= Texas State Highway 495 =

State highway in Hidalgo County, Texas United States

State Highway 495
- SH 495; highlighted in red

Route information
- Maintained by TxDOT
- Length: 17.731 mi (28.535 km)
- Existed: January 25, 2001–present

Major junctions
- West end: SH 364 in Palmview
- I-69C / US 281 in Pharr
- East end: FM 1423 northeast of Alamo

Location
- Country: United States
- State: Texas
- Counties: Hidalgo

Highway system
- Highways in Texas; Interstate; US; State; Former; Toll; Loops; Spurs; FM/RM; Park; Rec
← I-410	→ SH 550

State Highway 495 (SH 495) is a 17.731-mile (28.535 km) state highway in the Rio Grande Valley in Hidalgo County, Texas, United States, that connects Texas State Highway 364 (SH 364) in Palmview with Farm to Market Road 1423 (FM 1423), northeast of Alamo. The route was designated in 2001, replacing Farm to Market Road 495 (FM 495). It runs parallel to US 83 for its entire route. In McAllen, the route is also known as Pecan Boulevard.

== Route description ==
SH 495 begins at SH 364 (La Homa Road) in Palmview near I-2/US 83. The highway heads east along Pecan Boulevard through Mission to an intersection with SH 107 (Conway Avenue). It has an intersection with FM 494 (Shary Road) before entering McAllen. In McAllen, the highway has intersections with FM 2220 (Ware Road), FM 1926 (23rd Street), SH 336 (10th Street), and FM 2061 (McColl Street). As it enters Pharr, the highway passes under I-69C/US 281, intersecting the freeway's frontage roads. The highway continues east into Alamo to an intersection with FM 907. The highway continues east, leaving Alamo, to its eastern terminus at FM 1423 (Val Verde Road).

== History ==
FM 495 was designated on June 26, 1945, running from Ware Road, northwest of McAllen, east to Val Verde Road, northeast of Alamo. On February 25, 1949, the route was extended south to US 83. On September 7, 1949, the section from FM 1423 to US 83 was transferred to FM 1423. On December 17, 1952, the route was extended west to SH 107 on the north side of Mission. On August 29, 1989, it was again extended west, this time to connect with US 83 in Palmview. The route was redesignated SH 495 on January 23, 2001, and was extended westward to Abram Road to make a new connection with US 83; one section was transferred to SH 364.

== Junction list ==
The entire route is in Hidalgo County.

Location	mi	km	Destinations	Notes
Palmview	0.000	0.000	East Veterans Boulevard	Continuation west from western terminus
Palmview	0.000	0.000	SH 364 (La Homa Road)	Western terminus
Mission			SH 107 (Conway Avenue)	
Mission			FM 494 (Shary Road)	
McAllen			FM 2220 (Ware Road)	
McAllen			FM 1926 (23rd Street)	
McAllen			SH 336 (10th Street)	
McAllen			FM 2061 (McColl Street)	
Pharr			I-69C / US 281 (Cage Boulevard)	I-69C exit 1A southbound; interchange
Alamo–Alamo line			FM 907 (Alamo Road)	
	17.731	28.535	FM 1423 (Valverde Road)	Eastern terminus; T intersection
1.000 mi = 1.609 km; 1.000 km = 0.621 mi

== See also ==
- List of state highways in Texas
