= Interstate 494 (disambiguation) =

Interstate 494 is part of a beltway around portions of Minneapolis-Saint Paul, Minnesota.

Interstate 494 may also refer to:

- Crosstown Expressway (Chicago), proposed highway route in Chicago, Illinois in the 1960s through the 1970s
- Lake Shore Drive, proposed as "Interstate 494" in Chicago, Illinois in the 1950s through the 1960s
