= Japan National Route 491 =

Road in Yamaguchi prefecture, Japan

National Route 491
- 国道491号
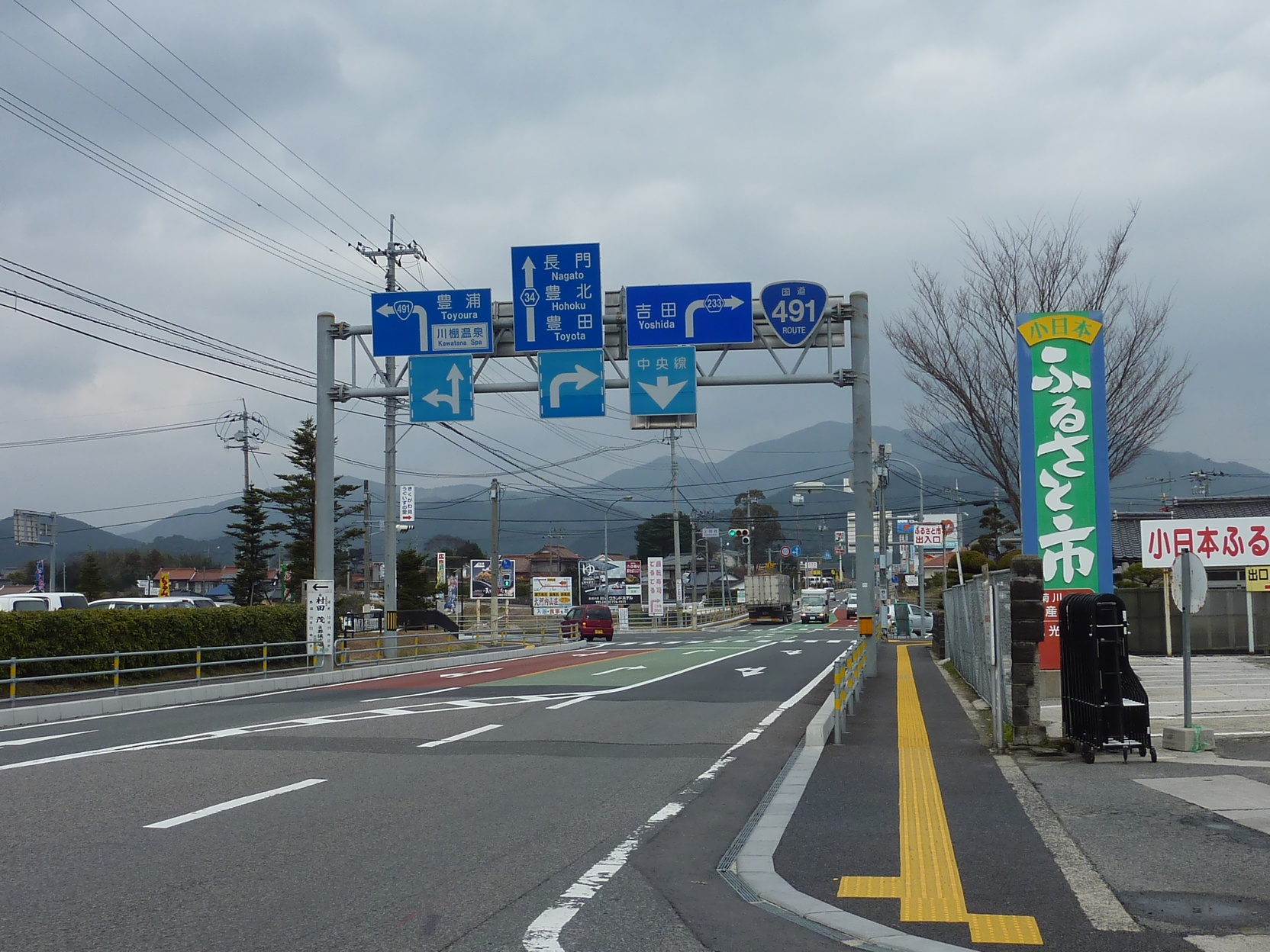

Route information
- Length: 53.4 km (33.2 mi)

Location
- Country: Japan

Highway system
- National highways of Japan; Expressways of Japan
← National Route 490	→ National Route 492

National Route 491 is a national highway of Japan. The highway connects Shimonoseki, Yamaguchi and Nagato, Yamaguchi. It has a total length of 53.4 kilometers (33.2 mi).
