= Japan National Route 492 =

Road in Japan

National Route 492
- 国道492号
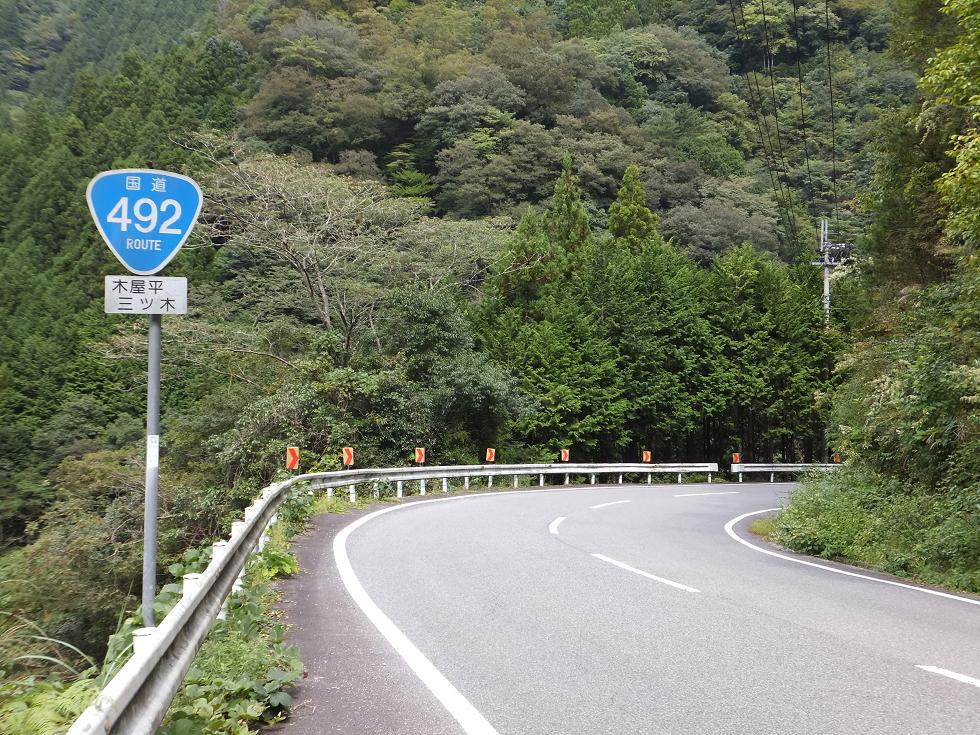

Route information
- Length: 166.9 km (103.7 mi)

Location
- Country: Japan

Highway system
- National highways of Japan; Expressways of Japan
← National Route 491	→ National Route 493

National Route 492 is a national highway of Japan connecting between Takamatsu, Kagawa and Ōtoyo, Kōchi in Japan. It has a total length of 166.9 km (103.79 mi).
