= Weslaco, Texas =

City in Texas, United States

- City
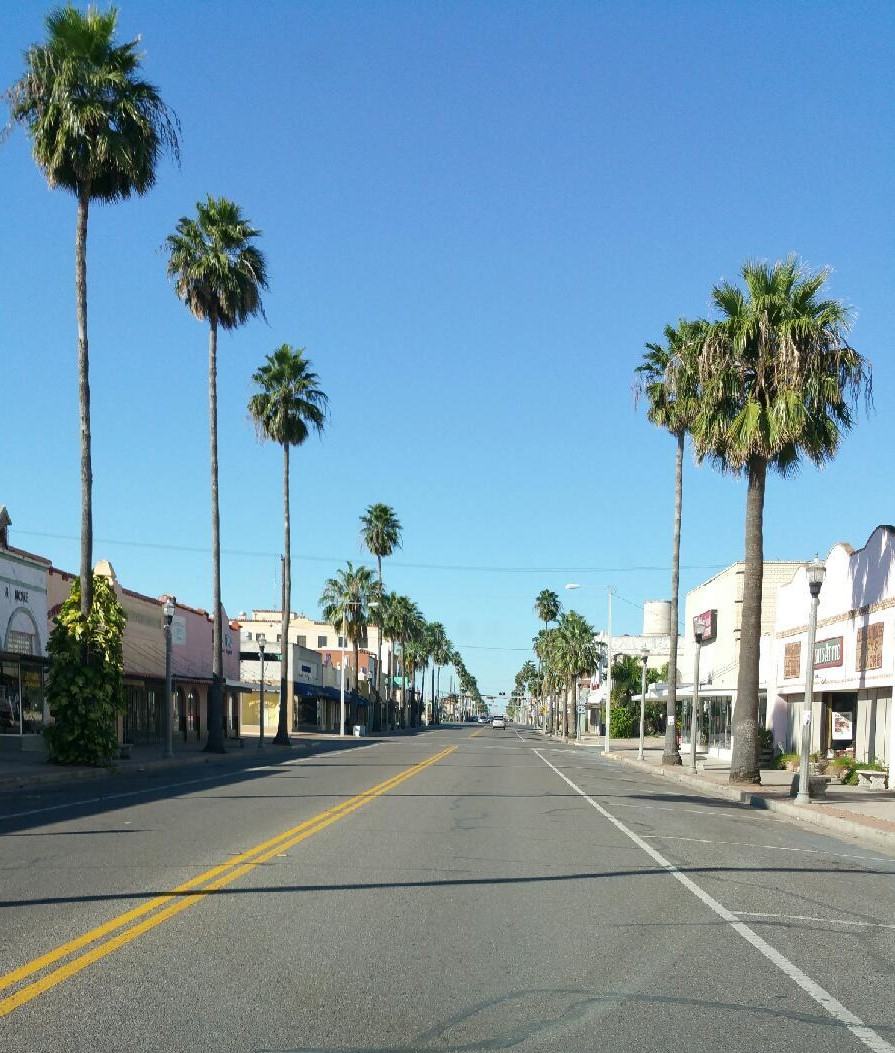

- Coordinates: 26°9′33″N 97°59′15″W
- Country: United States
- State: Texas
- County: Hidalgo

Government
  - Type: Council–manager
  - City council: Mayor Adrian Gonzalez; Gregory P. Kerr; Leo Munoz; Leticia "Letty" Lopez; Jose "JP" Rodriguez; Josh Pedraza; Adrian Farias
  - City manager: Martin Garza

Area
  - Total: 16.45 sq mi (42.61 km^{2})
  - Land: 16.38 sq mi (42.42 km^{2})
  - Water: 0.073 sq mi (0.19 km^{2})
- Elevation: 79 ft (24 m)

Population (2020)
  - Total: 40,160
  - Density: 2,452/sq mi (946.7/km^{2})
- Time zone: UTC-6 (Central (CST))
  - Summer (DST): UTC-5 (CDT)
- ZIP Codes: 78596, 78599
- Area code: 956
- FIPS code: 48-77272
- GNIS feature ID: 1349656
- Website: www.weslacotx.gov

Weslaco (/ˈwɛsləkoʊ/ WESS-lə-koh) is a city in Hidalgo County, Texas, United States. As of the 2020 census the population was 41,103, Studies from 2023 show the population is 43,053 and in 2020 the estimated population was 40,160. It is at the southern tip of Texas in the Rio Grande Valley near the Mexican border, across the Rio Grande from the city of Nuevo Progreso, Rio Bravo, Tamaulipas.

Weslaco derives its name from the W.E. Stewart Land Company. It was the hometown of Harlon Block, one of the Marines photographed raising the flag at Iwo Jima, and of film and television actor David Spielberg.

== Geography ==
Weslaco is located in southeastern Hidalgo County at 26°9′33″N 97°59′15″W (26.159130, –97.987374). It is bordered to the east by the city of Mercedes and to the west by the city of Donna. Interstate 2 and U.S. Route 83 pass through Weslaco, leading west 16 miles (26 km) to McAllen and east 19 miles (31 km) to Harlingen. Weslaco is 5 miles (8 km) north of Progreso and 7 miles (11 km) north of the bridge over the Rio Grande to Nuevo Progreso in the Mexican state of Tamaulipas.

According to the United States Census Bureau, Weslaco has a total area of 14.8 square miles (38.3 km^{2}), of which 14.7 square miles (38.1 km^{2}) are land and 0.1 square miles (0.2 km^{2}), or 0.49%, are water.

== Climate ==
The climate in this area is characterized by two seasons; a wet season from April to September and a dry season from October to March. According to the Köppen Climate Classification system, Weslaco has a humid subtropical climate, abbreviated "Cfa" on climate maps. It is the most easterly city in the central states of the Great Plains with a humid subtropical climate bounded by a semi-arid climate to the west, reflecting in its most shrubby vegetation. The average high in January is 71 °F (21.7 °C) and the average low is 50 °F (10.0 °C). The average high is 97 °F (36.1 °C) and the average low is 76 °F (24.4 °C) in August. The warm season is extremely long, as average high temperatures from May through September are above 90 °F (32.2 °C) and average low temperatures are above 70 °F (21.1 °C), with relatively high dew point values resulting in higher relative humidity values and heat index values. Heat index values can consistently reach over 100 °F (37.8 °C) during these months.

Average annual precipitation is only 25.73 inches (654 mm). Most precipitation occurs in the wet season which occurs from April to September, with the least precipitation distinctly occurring in the dry season from October to March. As September is the peak of the north Atlantic hurricane season and tropical storms and hurricanes occasionally drop copious amounts of rainfall on the region, this month tends to be by far the wettest, averaging 5.64 inches (143 mm) of rain. The driest month is February, with only 0.95 inches (24 mm) of precipitation.

The record snowfall was 3.00 inches (76 mm) on December 25, 2004. It snowed again on December 8, 2017. Weslaco received 10-12 inches of rain in October of 2015 that impacted several areas, particularly with drainage systems being overflooded. On June 15, 2026, during Tropical Storm Arthur, Weslaco received six inches (150 mm) of rain causing floodwaters to enter homes.

Temperatures are frequently above 100 °F (37.8 °C), occasionally as early as February and as late as the end of October, the highest temperature ever recorded in Weslaco was 110 °F (43.3 °C) on April 17, 1920. The lowest temperature ever recorded in Weslaco was 16 °F (−8.9 °C), on January 12, 1962 and December 23, 1989.

Climate data for Weslaco, Texas, 1991–2020 normals, extremes 1914–present
Month	Jan	Feb	Mar	Apr	May	Jun	Jul	Aug	Sep	Oct	Nov	Dec	Year
Record high °F (°C)	93 (34)	100 (38)	104 (40)	110 (43)	108 (42)	107 (42)	108 (42)	106 (41)	107 (42)	104 (40)	99 (37)	94 (34)	110 (43)
Mean maximum °F (°C)	85.4 (29.7)	89.6 (32.0)	92.8 (33.8)	94.9 (34.9)	96.0 (35.6)	99.5 (37.5)	100.5 (38.1)	101.4 (38.6)	99.0 (37.2)	95.6 (35.3)	90.4 (32.4)	86.0 (30.0)	102.4 (39.1)
Mean daily maximum °F (°C)	71.3 (21.8)	75.4 (24.1)	80.7 (27.1)	86.3 (30.2)	90.3 (32.4)	94.6 (34.8)	95.7 (35.4)	97.3 (36.3)	92.0 (33.3)	87.2 (30.7)	79.9 (26.6)	72.0 (22.2)	85.2 (29.6)
Daily mean °F (°C)	60.7 (15.9)	64.4 (18.0)	70.4 (21.3)	75.7 (24.3)	80.9 (27.2)	85.1 (29.5)	86.1 (30.1)	86.9 (30.5)	82.4 (28.0)	76.6 (24.8)	69.2 (20.7)	61.8 (16.6)	75.0 (23.9)
Mean daily minimum °F (°C)	50.0 (10.0)	53.5 (11.9)	60.4 (15.8)	65.1 (18.4)	71.5 (21.9)	75.5 (24.2)	76.5 (24.7)	76.4 (24.7)	72.8 (22.7)	66.0 (18.9)	58.4 (14.7)	51.6 (10.9)	64.8 (18.2)
Mean minimum °F (°C)	35.8 (2.1)	39.5 (4.2)	43.9 (6.6)	51.2 (10.7)	60.1 (15.6)	68.6 (20.3)	71.3 (21.8)	71.1 (21.7)	63.7 (17.6)	50.3 (10.2)	42.9 (6.1)	36.2 (2.3)	32.9 (0.5)
Record low °F (°C)	16 (−9)	20 (−7)	26 (−3)	33 (1)	47 (8)	53 (12)	62 (17)	62 (17)	48 (9)	33 (1)	30 (−1)	16 (−9)	16 (−9)
Average precipitation inches (mm)	1.02 (26)	0.95 (24)	1.45 (37)	1.46 (37)	2.61 (66)	2.79 (71)	2.24 (57)	1.87 (47)	5.64 (143)	2.84 (72)	1.61 (41)	1.25 (32)	25.73 (653)
Source 1: NOAA
Source 2: National Weather Service

== Demographics ==
Historical population
Census	Pop.	Note	%±
1930	4,879		—
1940	6,883		41.1%
1950	7,514		9.2%
1960	15,649		108.3%
1970	15,313		−2.1%
1980	19,331		26.2%
1990	21,877		13.2%
2000	26,935		23.1%
2010	35,670		32.4%
2020	40,160		12.6%
U.S. Decennial Census

=== 2020 census ===
As of the 2020 census, Weslaco had a population of 40,160. The median age was 33.6 years; 28.5% of residents were under the age of 18 and 16.1% of residents were 65 years of age or older. For every 100 females there were 90.2 males, and for every 100 females age 18 and over there were 86.4 males.

There were 9,998 families residing in the city and 13,239 households, of which 42.0% had children under the age of 18 living in them. Of all households, 46.7% were married-couple households, 15.6% were households with a male householder and no spouse or partner present, and 31.6% were households with a female householder and no spouse or partner present. About 21.8% of all households were made up of individuals and 10.7% had someone living alone who was 65 years of age or older.

There were 16,190 housing units, of which 18.2% were vacant. The homeowner vacancy rate was 1.5% and the rental vacancy rate was 10.0%.

99.3% of residents lived in urban areas, while 0.7% lived in rural areas.

Racial composition as of the 2020 census
Race	Number	Percent
White	16,631	41.4%
Black or African American	235	0.6%
American Indian and Alaska Native	356	0.9%
Asian	399	1.0%
Native Hawaiian and Other Pacific Islander	6	0.0%
Some other race	7,815	19.5%
Two or more races	14,718	36.6%
Hispanic or Latino (of any race)	35,768	89.1%

=== 2000 census ===
According to the census of 2000, there were 26,935 people, 8,295 households, and 6,602 families residing in the city. The population density was 2,123.1 inhabitants per square mile (819.7/km^{2}). There were 10,230 housing units at an average density of 806.4 per square mile (311.4/km^{2}). The racial makeup of the city was 14.92% White, 0.27% African American, 0.49% Native American, 1.14% Asian, 0.06% Pacific Islander, 20.93% from other races, and 2.19% from two or more races. Hispanic or Latino of any race were 83.76% of the population.

There were 8,295 households, out of which 41.1% had children under the age of 18 living with them, 59.2% were married couples living together, 17.0% had a female householder with no husband present, and 20.4% were non-families. 18.4% of all households were made up of individuals, and 10.8% had someone living alone who was 65 years of age or older. The average household size was 3.21 and the average family size was 3.68.

In the city, the population was spread out, with 31.8% under the age of 18, 9.9% from 18 to 24, 25.9% from 25 to 44, 17.2% from 45 to 64, and 15.1% who were 65 years of age or older. The median age was 31 years. For every 100 females, there were 87.9 males. For every 100 females age 18 and over, there were 82.4 males.

The median income for a household in the city was $26,573, and the median income for a family was $29,215. Males had a median income of $24,202 versus $19,688 for females. The per capita income for the city was $11,235. About 26.5% of families and 30.9% of the population were below the poverty line, including 40.6% of those under age 18 and 23.5% of those age 65 or over.

== Economy ==
=== Trade ===
Following the ratification of the North American Free Trade Agreement in 1994, cross-border cargo and vehicular traffic in the county increased 345% and 36.4% respectively since the beginning of the 1990s, from 228,133 to 1,015,554 cargo trucks in 2008 and from 10.92 million to 14.9 million automobiles. US/Mexico trade crossing the international bridge in Hidalgo County increased from $5.0 billion in 1994, pre-NAFTA, to $12.56 billion in 2000 and $19.9 billion in 2006. From 1995 to 2006 the Rio Grande Valley share of NAFTA trade increased 168% from $11.1 billion to $31.6 billion.

=== Healthcare services ===
Prime Healthcare Services, through its subsidiary Knapp Medical Center, serves Weslaco's emergency medical needs. The facility is outfitted with a Heli-Pad, Level 3 Trauma Unit and 233 hospital beds. Surrounding Knapp Medical is an unofficial healthcare district featuring a concentration of physicians, medical services and pharmacies. This district draws patients from the entire Mid-Valley. Weslaco residents can check with local providers for other specialized needs.

== Government ==
The mayor was Adrian Gonzalez as of 2020.

== Education ==
=== Primary and secondary schools ===
Public education in Weslaco is provided by the Weslaco Independent School District, Idea Public Schools, and South Texas Independent School District. There are 4 private schools: San Martin de Porres Catholic School, Valley Grande Adventist Academy, Mid-Valley Christian School, and First Christian Academy. Weslaco also has two Charter schools: Horizon Montessori and Technology Education Charter High School. The city has a Head Start Program, pre-kinder programs as well as several privately owned day care centers.

=== College and trade schools ===
Continuing education facilities located within Weslaco include South Texas College (Mid-Valley Campus), South Texas Vocational Technical Institute, and Valley Grande Institute for Academic Studies. Texas A&M operates an agricultural research center in Weslaco.

== Public library ==
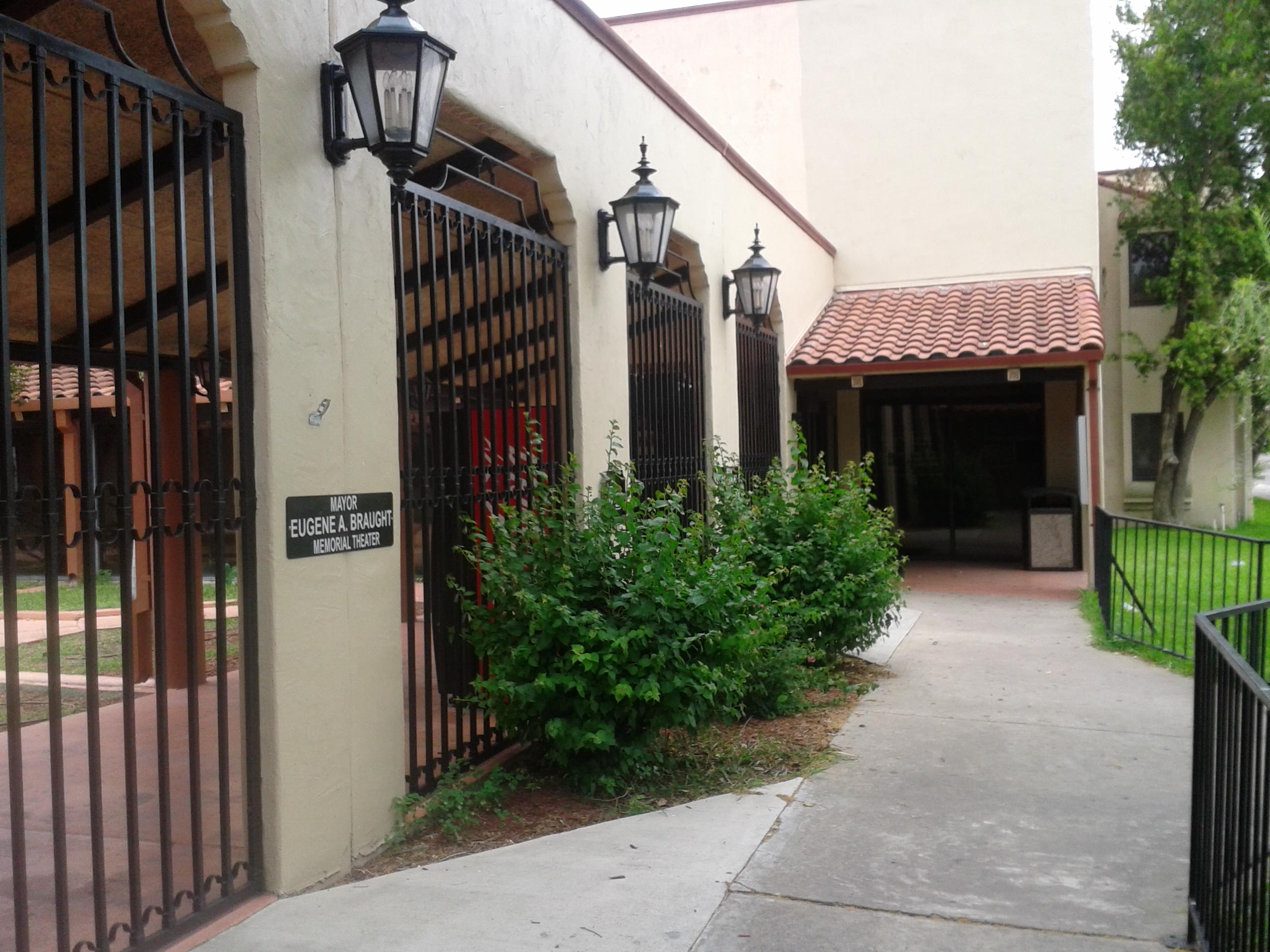
Public Library

The Mayor Joe V. Sanchez Public Library serves Weslaco.

== Notable people ==
- Natalia Anciso, contemporary artist and educator, born in Weslaco
- Harlon Block, United States Marine; lived in Weslaco and graduated from Weslaco High School
- Omar Figueroa Jr., professional boxer, former WBC Lightweight world title holder; lives in Weslaco and graduated from Weslaco East High School
- Roberto García, professional boxer; former WBC Middleweight Silver title holder; lives in Weslaco and graduated from Weslaco High School
- Pat Hingle, actor; lived in Weslaco and graduated from Weslaco High School
- Bryan Hollon, American theologian and academic administrator, raised in Weslaco
- Chuck Leah; Americana singer-songwriter, record producer, multi-instrumentalist born in Weslaco
- Gonzalo Lopez, criminal, born in Weslaco
- David Spielberg, actor, born in Weslaco

== Museum ==
The Weslaco Museum has exhibits and hosts events for local residents.

== Parks ==
Weslaco is home to one of the nine sites of the World Birding Center in the Rio Grande Valley. The site is located within the Estero Llano Grande State Park. The Valley Nature Center is a six-acre park and environmental education center that focuses on the plants and animals of the Rio Grande Valley.

=== City parks ===
The City of Weslaco Parks & Recreation Department maintains six city parks, and three public swimming pools.

== Tourism ==
Weslaco is a Winter Texan destination and a gateway between Texas and Mexico.
