= La Blanca, Texas =

- Census-designated place
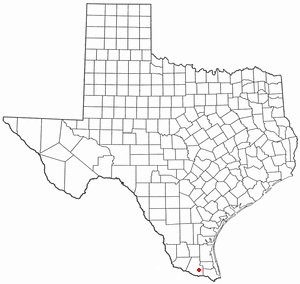
- Location of La Blanca, Texas

- Coordinates: 26°18′29″N 98°1′50″W
- Country: United States of America
- State: Texas
- County: Hidalgo

Area
  - Total: 4.1 sq mi (10.7 km^{2})
  - Land: 4.1 sq mi (10.7 km^{2})
  - Water: 0 sq mi (0.0 km^{2})
- Elevation: 69 ft (21 m)

Population (2020)
  - Total: 2,078
  - Density: 503/sq mi (194/km^{2})
- Time zone: UTC-6 (Central (CST))
  - Summer (DST): UTC-5 (CDT)
- ZIP code: 78558
- Area code: 956
- FIPS code: 48-39988
- GNIS feature ID: 1339278

La Blanca is a census-designated place (CDP) in Hidalgo County, Texas, United States. The population was 2,078 at the 2020 United States Census. It is part of the McAllen–Edinburg–Mission Metropolitan Statistical Area.

== Geography ==
La Blanca is located at State Hwy 107 and Farm Rd 493, eight miles east of Edinburg and 10 miles north of Donna 26°18′29″N 98°01′50″W (26.308188, -98.030491).

According to the United States Census Bureau, the CDP has a total area of 4.2 square miles (11 km^{2}), all land.

== Demographics ==
Historical population
Census	Pop.	Note	%±
2000	2,351		—
2010	2,488		5.8%
2020	2,078		−16.5%
U.S. Decennial Census; 1850–1900 1910; 1920 1930 1940; 1950 1960 1970; 1980 1990 2000; 2010 2020

La Blanca first appeared as a census designated place in the 2000 U.S. census.

=== 2020 census ===
La Blanca CDP, Texas – Racial and ethnic composition Note: the US Census treats Hispanic/Latino as an ethnic category. This table excludes Latinos from the racial categories and assigns them to a separate category. Hispanics/Latinos may be of any race.
Race / Ethnicity (NH = Non-Hispanic)	Pop 2000	Pop 2010	Pop 2020	% 2000	% 2010	% 2020
White alone (NH)	46	113	105	1.96%	4.54%	5.05%
Black or African American alone (NH)	0	1	0	0.00%	0.04%	0.00%
Native American or Alaska Native alone (NH)	3	0	3	0.13%	0.00%	0.14%
Asian alone (NH)	0	0	5	0.00%	0.00%	0.24%
Native Hawaiian or Pacific Islander alone (NH)	0	0	0	0.00%	0.00%	0.00%
Other race alone (NH)	9	0	12	0.38%	0.00%	0.57%
Mixed race or Multiracial (NH)	4	0	9	0.17%	0.00%	0.43%
Hispanic or Latino (any race)	2,289	2,374	1,944	97.36%	95.42%	93.55%
Total	2,351	2,488	2,078	100.00%	100.00%	100.00%

As of the census of 2000, there were 2,351 people, 548 households, and 522 families residing in the CDP. The population density was 566.5 inhabitants per square mile (218.7/km^{2}). There were 589 housing units at an average density of 141.9 per square mile (54.8/km^{2}). The racial makeup of the CDP was 73.54% White, 1.11% Native American, 0.17% Asian, 24.12% from other races, and 1.06% from two or more races. Hispanic or Latino of any race were 97.36% of the population.

There were 548 households, out of which 66.8% had children under the age of 18 living with them, 78.1% were married couples living together, 14.4% had a female householder with no husband present, and 4.7% were non-families. 3.8% of all households were made up of individuals, and 1.5% had someone living alone who was 65 years of age or older. The average household size was 4.29 and the average family size was 4.41.

In the CDP, the population was spread out, with 40.7% under the age of 18, 11.8% from 18 to 24, 29.0% from 25 to 44, 14.2% from 45 to 64, and 4.2% who were 65 years of age or older. The median age was 23 years. For every 100 females, there were 94.1 males. For every 100 females age 18 and over, there were 89.8 males.

The median income for a household in the CDP was $21,688, and the median income for a family was $22,063. Males had a median income of $17,841 versus $11,846 for females. The per capita income for the CDP was $6,421. About 35.3% of families and 38.6% of the population were below the poverty line, including 38.3% of those under age 18 and 41.4% of those age 65 or over.

== Education ==
Most of the CDP is in the Edinburg Consolidated Independent School District (ECISD), while a portion in the east is in the Edcouch-Elsa Independent School District.

John F. Kennedy Elementary School (grades PK-5) is the elementary school for La Blanca in ECISD. Harwell Middle School(6-8) includes most of the CDP, while a portion is zoned to Memorial Middle School. All ECISD areas are zoned to Economedes High School (9-12).

Edcouch-Elsa High School is the comprehensive high school of the Edcouch-Elsa district.

In addition, La Blanca residents are allowed to apply to magnet schools operated by the South Texas Independent School District.

All of Hidalgo County is in the service area of South Texas College.
