= La Villa, Texas =

- City
- City of La Villa
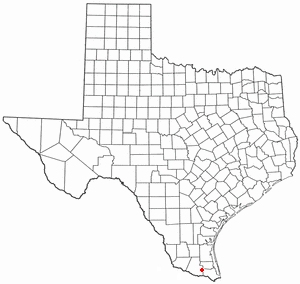
- Location of La Villa, Texas

- Coordinates: 26°17′53″N 97°55′37″W
- Country: United States of America
- State: Texas
- County: Hidalgo

Government
  - Type: The City of La Villa is a Type A General Law operating under the Council-Manager form of government.

Area
  - Total: 0.59 sq mi (1.54 km^{2})
  - Land: 0.59 sq mi (1.54 km^{2})
  - Water: 0 sq mi (0.00 km^{2})
- Elevation: 52 ft (16 m)

Population (2020)
  - Total: 2,804
  - Density: 4,812.1/sq mi (1,857.97/km^{2})
- Time zone: UTC-6 (Central (CST))
  - Summer (DST): UTC-5 (CDT)
- ZIP code: 78562
- Area code: 956
- FIPS code: 48-41788
- GNIS feature ID: 1339419
- Website: cityoflavilla.org

La Villa is a city in Hidalgo County, Texas, United States. The population was 2,804 at the 2020 United States census. It is part of the McAllen–Edinburg–Mission and Reynosa–McAllen metropolitan areas.

== Geography ==
La Villa is located at 26°17′53″N 97°55′37″W (26.298093, –97.926927).

According to the United States Census Bureau, the city has a total area of 0.3 square miles (0.78 km^{2}), all land.

== Demographics ==
Historical population
Census	Pop.	Note	%±
1960	1,261		—
1970	1,255		−0.5%
1980	1,442		14.9%
1990	1,388		−3.7%
2000	1,305		−6.0%
2010	1,957		50.0%
2020	2,804		43.3%
U.S. Decennial Census

=== 2020 census ===
La Villa racial composition (NH = Non-Hispanic) (Note: Note: the US Census treats Hispanic/Latino as an ethnic category. This table excludes Latinos from the racial categories and assigns them to a separate category. Hispanics/Latinos can be of any race.)
Race	Number	Percentage
White (NH)	702	25.04%
Black or African American (NH)	4	0.14%
Asian (NH)	3	0.11%
Some Other Race (NH)	2	0.07%
Mixed/Multi-Racial (NH)	4	0.14%
Hispanic or Latino	2,089	74.5%
Total	2,804	

As of the 2020 census, there were 2,804 people and 305 families residing in the city.

The median age was 34.4 years. 19.3% of residents were under the age of 18 and 7.5% of residents were 65 years of age or older. For every 100 females there were 177.6 males, and for every 100 females age 18 and over there were 213.0 males age 18 and over.

58.7% of residents lived in urban areas, while 41.3% lived in rural areas.

There were 435 households in La Villa, of which 53.1% had children under the age of 18 living in them. Of all households, 50.3% were married-couple households, 14.7% were households with a male householder and no spouse or partner present, and 30.8% were households with a female householder and no spouse or partner present. About 9.2% of all households were made up of individuals and 3.5% had someone living alone who was 65 years of age or older.

There were 472 housing units, of which 7.8% were vacant. The homeowner vacancy rate was 0.5% and the rental vacancy rate was 4.8%.

Racial composition as of the 2020 census
Race	Number	Percent
White	1,615	57.6%
Black or African American	8	0.3%
American Indian and Alaska Native	7	0.2%
Asian	3	0.1%
Native Hawaiian and Other Pacific Islander	0	0.0%
Some other race	281	10.0%
Two or more races	890	31.7%
Hispanic or Latino (of any race)	2,089	74.5%

=== 2000 census ===
At the 2000 census there were 1,305 people in 323 households, including 290 families, in the city. The population density was 4,870.4 inhabitants per square mile (1,880.5/km^{2}). There were 354 housing units at an average density of 1,321.2 per square mile (510.1/km^{2}). The racial makeup of the city was 66.67% White, 0.08% African American, 0.38% Native American, 0.08% Pacific Islander, 30.34% from other races, and 2.45% from two or more races. Hispanic or Latino of any race were 98.08%.

Of the 323 households 49.8% had children under the age of 18 living with them, 62.2% were married couples living together, 25.4% had a female householder with no husband present, and 10.2% were non-families. 9.9% of households were one person and 5.6% were one person aged 65 or older. The average household size was 4.04 and the average family size was 4.35.

The age distribution was 37.1% under the age of 18, 12.6% from 18 to 24, 25.6% from 25 to 44, 16.5% from 45 to 64, and 8.2% 65 or older. The median age was 25 years. For every 100 females, there were 87.5 males. For every 100 females age 18 and over, there were 84.1 males.

The median household income was $18,333 and the median family income was $20,284. Males had a median income of $14,769 versus $15,682 for females. The per capita income for the city was $5,432. About 48.4% of families and 47.6% of the population were below the poverty line, including 59.5% of those under age 18 and 35.9% of those age 65 or over.

== Education ==
La Villa is served by the La Villa Independent School District.

In January 2014 the school district had 625 students. During that month, shortly after the end of the winter holiday, because La Villa ISD refused to pay the City of La Villa's increased surcharge rate, the city shut off water and sewer services to the schools. They were forced to temporarily close.

In addition, South Texas Independent School District operates magnet schools that serve the community.
