= Weslaco East High School =

Public school in Texas, United States

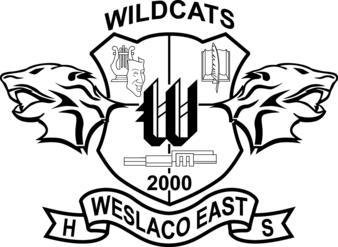

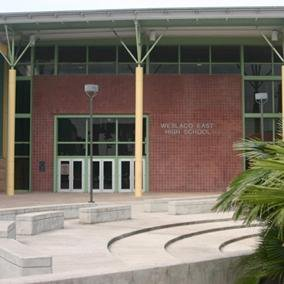
- Front doors of school

Location
- 810 S. Pleasantview Drive; Weslaco, Texas 78596; United States
- Coordinates: 26.152048°N 97.97039°W

Information
- School type: Public High School
- Established: 2000
- Superintendent: Richard Rivera
- Principal: David Gamboa
- Teaching staff: 148.77 (FTE)
- Grades: 9-12
- Enrollment: 2,122 (2023–2024)
- Average class size: 30
- Student to teacher ratio: 14.26
- Campus: Large Suburb
- Colors: Black, white, and purple
- Slogan: Creating new visions; Reaching new horizons
- Sports: Baseball, Basketball, Cross Country, Football, Golf, Power-lifting, Soccer, Swimming, Tennis, Track & Field, Cheerleading, Softball, Volleyball, Wrestling
- Mascot: Wildcat
- Rival: Weslaco High School
- Publication: Wildcat News
- Website: www.wehs.wisd.us

The Weslaco East High School (established 2000) is a school in Weslaco, Texas, USA. It is the second high school to be established in Weslaco (after the Weslaco High School). In the first year of the school, Weslaco East High School served only 9th and 10th grade students while Weslaco High School served 11th and 12th grade students.

In 2002, Weslaco East earned the TEA "Recognized School" rating for a Weslaco, Texas High School and for the two years after that. Weslaco East then added an 11th grade class in the 2002-03 school year and a 12th grade class the following year. In the 2003-2004 school year, Weslaco East had its first class of graduating seniors.

In the school year of 2007-08 and also again in 2009-10, Weslaco East High School received a Silver Medal Rating from the U.S. News & World Report, and Weslaco East was marked as one of the Top High Schools in the United States. In the school year of 2012, there were enough students enrolled in Weslaco East to be re-labeled as a ‘’5A‘’ school. The school was classified "6A" in the 2014 realignment.

Weslaco East High serves the following areas: Much of Weslaco, the western portion of Mercedes, Llano Grande, half of Olivarez, and a section of the WISD portion of Mila Doce.

== Clubs and organizations ==
There are a total of 29 clubs and organizations that are at Weslaco East High school.

- Anime/ Manga Book Club
- Art Club
- Astronomy (Dead Star Society) Club
- AV Club
- Book Club
- BPA
- Cheerleading
- Computer Science Club
- Criminal Justice Club
- Dance Club
- D.Bowie/Si Club
- DECA
- Drama Club
- Environmental Club
- FCCLA- Gonzalez
- FCCLA- Sanchez
- FFA
- HOSA- Arambula
- HOSA- Garcia
- JROTC
- LEOS Club
- National Honor Society
- National Science Honor Society
- PEACE Club
- Ready Set Teach
- Science Club
- Skills USA
- Spanish Club
- Student Council
- UIL

== See also ==
- Education in the United States
