= List of Texas communities with Hispanic majority populations in the 2000 census =

The following is a list of Texas cities, towns, and census-designated places in which a majority (over 50%) of the population is Hispanic or Latino, according to data from the 2010 Census.

== Cities with over 500,000 people ==
- El Paso (2000, 76.62%)
- San Antonio (63.2%)

== Cities with 100,000 to 499,999 people ==
- Brownsville (93.2%)
- Corpus Christi (59.7%)
- Laredo (95.6%)
- McAllen (84.6%)

== Cities with 25,000 to 99,999 people ==
- Del Rio (84.1%)
- Edinburg (88.2%)
- Harlingen (79.5%)
- Kingsville (71.4%)
- Mission (85.4%)
- Odessa (50.6%)
- Pharr (93.0%)
- Rosenberg (60.3%)
- San Juan (96.7%)
- Socorro (96.7%)
- Weslaco (85.0%)

== Communities with 10,000 to 24,999 people ==
=== Cities with 10,000 to 24,999 people ===
- Alamo (78.10%)
- Alice (85.1%)
- Beeville (71.9%)
- Donna (92.3%)
- Dumas (50.5%)
- Eagle Pass (95.5%)
- Freeport (59.9%)
- Galena Park (81.4%)
- Hereford (71.7%)
- Jacinto City (83.9%)
- Mercedes (91.9%)
- Port Lavaca (56.6%)
- Richmond (54.4%)
- Rio Grande City (94.3%)
- Robstown (93.6%)
- Rosenberg (60.3%)
- San Benito (90.7%)
- Seguin (55.4%)
- South Houston (88.1%)
- Uvalde (78.4%)

=== Unincorporated Census Designated Places with 10,000 to 24,999 people ===
- Aldine (82.1%)
- La Homa (97.1%)
- San Elizario (98.7%)

== Communities with fewer than 10,000 people ==
=== Cities with fewer than 10,000 people ===
- Agua Dulce, Nueces County (99.2%)
- Alpine (51.2%)
- Alton (93.6%)
- Arcola (62.4%)
- Asherton (92.9%)
- Austwell (57.29%) (now 44.9%)
- Balcones Heights (74.5%)
- Balmorhea (83.7%)
- Barstow (78.5%)
- Benavides (91.4%)
- Big Lake (62.4%)
- Big Wells (94.1%)
- Bishop (67.5%)
- Bovina (82.3%)
- Brackettville (75.7%)
- Cactus (74.1%)
- Carrizo Springs (89.6%)
- Charlotte (75.1%)
- Cockrell Hill (90.7%)
- Cotulla (87.3%)
- Crystal City (97.1%)
- Dell City (66.3%)
- Devine (60.0%)
- Dilley (73.3%)
- Dimmitt (68.6%)
- Driscoll (83.5%)
- Earth (63.8%)
- Edcouch (97.8%)
- Eden (68.5%)
- El Cenizo (99.2%)
- Eldorado (61.3%)
- Elmendorf (64.7%)
- Elsa (97.8%)
- Encinal (89.6%)
- Falfurrias (92.0%)
- Floresville (65.1%)
- Floydada (61.6%)
- Fort Stockton (73.7%)
- Freer (82.0%)
- Friona (69.9%)
- George West (50.6%)
- Granjeno (99.7%)
- Gregory (90.9%)
- Hale Center (63.2%)
- Hart (74.62%)
- Hidalgo (98.4%)
- Hondo (63.5%)
- Horizon City (85.9%)
- Impact (71.4%)
- Jourdanton (54.8%)
- Karnes City (65.3%)
- Kenedy (68.6%)
- Kress (61.7%)
- La Feria (85.0%)
- La Grulla (98.1%)
- La Joya (97.6%)
- La Villa (96.9%)
- LaCoste (60.4%)
- Lamesa (58.7%)
- Lorenzo (59.0%)
- Los Fresnos (88.2%)
- Los Ybanez (73.7%)
- Lyford (98.3%)
- Lytle (65.6%)
- Marfa (68.7%)
- Martindale (56.5%)
- Mathis (91.6%)
- McCamey (59.4%)
- Mobile City (77.7%)
- Morton (61.6%)
- Muleshoe (64.3%)
- Natalia (83.6%)
- New Home (52.7%)
- New Summerfield (71.5%)
- Nixon (76.3%)
- Odem (79.2%)
- O'Donnell (62.8%)
- Olton (69.5%)
- Orange Grove (51.2%)
- Palacios (60.4%)
- Palmhurst (78.7%)
- Palmview (97.2%)
- Pearsall (85.1%)
- Pecos (83.2%)
- Peñitas (98.2%)
- Petersburg (65.8%)
- Pleasanton (56.3%)
- Port Isabel (76.5%)
- Poteet (87.0%)
- Premont (84.5%)
- Presidio (93.8%)
- Progreso (98.4%)
- Ralls (58.0%)
- Raymondville (86.9%)
- Rio Bravo (98.9%)
- Rio Hondo (84.5%)
- Roma (94.8%)
- San Diego (94.0%)
- San Perlita (93.9%)
- Seagraves (65.6%)
- Sinton (71.6%)
- Smiley (67.0%)
- Somerset (67.0%)
- Sonora (62.7%)
- Spofford (63.2%)
- Stanton (55.4%)
- Sullivan City (99.6%)
- Taft (75.5%)
- Uhland (61.2%)
- Waelder (77.6%)
- Wilson (57.3%)

=== Towns with fewer than 10,000 people ===
- Anthony (69.4%)
- Christine (74.4%)
- Clint (89.8%)
- Combes (77.6%)
- Estelline (51.7%)
- Lockney (58.7%)
- Los Indios (95.5%)
- Meadow (59.5%)
- Miller's Cove (85.2%)
- Plains (58.1%)
- Poth (57.1%)
- Primera (88.7%)
- Rocksprings (74.5%)
- Runge (74.17%)
- Santa Rosa (97.0%)
- Toyah (51.1%)
- Valentine (58.2%)
- Van Horn (79.5%)
- Woodsboro (53.4%)

=== Villages with fewer than 10,000 people ===
- Rangerville (85.8%)
- Vinton (94.4%)

=== Unincorporated Census Designated Places with fewer than 10,000 people ===
- Abram-Perezville (81.59%)
- Agua Dulce, El Paso County (95.12%)
- Airport Road Addition (88.2%)
- Alfred-South La Paloma (57.43%)
- Alice Acres (92.2%)
- Alto Bonito (97.36%)
- Alton North (97.51%)
- Arroyo Alto (98.12%)
- Arroyo Colorado Estates (96.56%)
- Arroyo Gardens-La Tina Ranch (96.45%)
- Batesville (95.3%)
- Bausell and Ellis (84.82%)
- Bixby (79.4%)
- Bloomington (74.4%)
- Blue Berry Hill (82.3%)
- Bluetown-Iglesia Antigua (93.79%)
- Boling-Iago (50.83%)
- Botines (81.82%)
- Bruni (89.4%)
- Butterfield (93.0%)
- Cameron Park (99.3%)
- Cantu Addition (95.7%)
- Canutillo (90.8%)
- Carrizo Hill (95.5%)
- Catarina (79.7%)
- Cesar Chavez (93.9%)
- Chula Vista-Orason (91.37%)
- Chula Vista-River Spur (78.25%)
- Cienegas Terrace (95.17%)
- Citrus City (98.72%)
- Concepcion (100.0%)
- Coyanosa (97.5%)
- Coyote Acres (88.2%)
- Cuevitas (100.0%)
- Cumings (68.7%)
- Del Mar Heights (96.5%)
- Del Sol-Loma Linda (87.33%)
- Doffing (96.4%)
- Doolittle (98.1%)
- Edgewater-Paisano (68.68%)
- Eidson Road (98.9%)
- El Camino Angosto (94.9%)
- El Indio (88.9%)
- El Refugio (94.3%)
- Elm Creek (98.0%)
- Encantada-Ranchito El Calaboz (98.2%)
- Encino (93.0%)
- Escobares (98.72%)
- Fabens (96.8%)
- Falcon Heights (94.3%)
- Falcon Lake Estates (82.5%)
- Faysville (98.6%)
- Fifth Street (94.8%)
- Flowella (94.9%)
- Fort Hancock (95.4%)
- Fronton (100%)
- Garceno (86.0%)
- Grand Acres (100%)
- Green Valley Farms (96.9%)
- Guerra (66.7%)
- Havana (99.3%)
- Hebbronville (92.8%)
- Heidelberg (96.8%)
- Homestead Meadows North (89.5%)
- Homestead Meadows South (97.7%)
- Indian Hills (96.6%)
- K-Bar Ranch (71.5%)
- Knippa (61.0%)
- La Blanca (95.4%)
- La Casita-Garciasville (99.13%)
- La Feria North (70.8%)
- La Paloma (92.09%)
- La Paloma-Lost Creek (73.8%)
- La Presa (99.4%)
- La Pryor (90.5%)
- La Puerta (98.72%)
- La Rosita (98.8%)
- La Victoria (97.1%)
- Lago (100%)
- Laguna Heights (86.2%)
- Laguna Seca (98.9%)
- Laredo Ranchettes (100%)
- Larga Vista (96.77%)
- Las Colonias (91.52%)
- Las Lomas (89.6%)
- Las Lomitas (95.1%)
- Las Palmas-Juarez (96.10%)
- Las Quintas Fronterizas (98.7%)
- Lasana (82.1%)
- Lasara (95.0%)
- Laureles (96.5%)
- Lindsay, Reeves County (88.9%)
- Llano Grande (82.7%)
- Loma Linda East (94.86%)
- Lopeno (89.21%)
- Lopezville (98.7%)
- Los Alvarez (100%)
- Los Angeles Subdivision (94.19%)
- Los Ebanos (98.01%)
- Los Villareales (96.45%)
- Lozano (92.1%)
- Lyford South (98.84%)
- Medina (97.7%)
- Midway North (98.6%)
- Midway South (94.4%)
- Mila Doce (98.9%)
- Mirando City (95.2%)
- Monte Alto (94.7%)
- Morales-Sanchez (92.9%)
- Morgan Farm Area (61.78%)
- Morning Glory (98.0%)
- Muniz (99.8%)
- New Falcon (98.4%)
- North Alamo (93.0%)
- North Escobares (100%)
- North Pearsall (84.2%)
- North San Pedro (98.3%)
- Nurillo (96.70%)
- Oilton (97.5%)
- Olivarez (97.9%)
- Olmito (98.8%)
- Owl Ranch-Amargosa (93.93%)
- Ozona (68.2%)
- Palmview South (84.0%)
- Pawnee (90.05%)
- Pettus (54.11%)
- Prado Verde (68.7%)
- Quemado (93.5%)
- Radar Base (95.8%)
- Ranchette Estates (96.1%)
- Ranchitos Las Lomas (97.4%)
- Rancho Alegre (95.7%)
- Rancho Banquete (93.9%)
- Rancho Chico (88.9%)
- Ranchos Penitas West (98.1%)
- Ratamosa (73.39%)
- Realitos (92.82%)
- Redford (90.0%)
- Redwood (88.1%)
- Reid Hope King (97.7%)
- Relampago (94.7%)
- Roma Creek (99.7%)
- Rosita North (98.15%)
- Rosita South (83.14%)
- St. Paul, San Patricio County (71.6%)
- Salineno (99.34%)
- San Carlos (98.5%)
- San Ignacio (92.97%)
- San Isidro (90.8%)
- San Manuel-Linn (73.80%)
- San Pedro (96.56%)
- Sanderson (51.4%)
- Sandia (65.7%)
- Sandy Hollow-Escondidas (59.5%)
- Santa Cruz (100%)
- Santa Maria (99.5%)
- Santa Monica (84.3%)
- Scissors (97.5%)
- Sebastian (94.6%)
- Seth Ward (74.4%)
- Sierra Blanca (73.1%)
- Siesta Shores (93.6%)
- Skidmore (62.8%)
- Solis (84.0%)
- South Alamo (99.0%)
- South Fork Estates (97.1%)
- South Point (97.5%)
- Sparks (99.1%)
- Spring Garden-Terra Verde (97.11%)
- Study Butte-Terlingua (51.69%)
- Taft Southwest (95.5%)
- Tierra Bonita (95.7%)
- Tierra Grande (82.4%)
- Tornillo (98.7%)
- Tradewinds (82.2%)
- Tynan (74.8%)
- Uvalde Estates (91.8%)
- Val Verde Park (91.8%)
- Villa del Sol (95.4%)
- Villa Pancho (96.3%)
- Villa Verde (95.2%)
- West Pearsall (99.71%)
- West Sharyland (98.2%)
- Westway (97.3%)
- Willamar (100.0%)
- Yznaga (95.6%)
- Zapata Ranch (98.1%)
- Zapata (95.0%)

== See also ==
- List of U.S. communities with Hispanic majority populations
