= Reynosa–McAllen =

International transborder agglomeration in southern Texas and northern Tamaulipas

- Transborder Agglomeration
Interactive Map of Lower Rio Grande Valley
Brownsville–Harlingen–Raymondville, TX CSA
Brownsville–Harlingen, TX MSA
Raymondville, TX μSA
McAllen–Edinburg, TX CSA
McAllen–Edinburg–Mission, TX MSA
Rio Grande City–Roma, TX μSA
In Mexico
Matamoros, TM ZM
Reynosa, TM ZM
- Country: United States; Mexico
- State: Texas; Tamaulipas
- Principal cities: Reynosa; McAllen; Río Bravo: Mission; Edinburg; Pharr

Population (2010 est.)
  - Metro: 1,500,000 (85th)
- Time zone: UTC–06:00 (Zona Centro)
  - Summer (DST): UTC–05:00 (DST)

Reynosa–McAllen, also known as McAllen–Reynosa, or simply as Borderplex, is one of the six international conurbations along the Mexico–U.S border. The city of Reynosa is situated in the Mexican state of Tamaulipas, on the southern bank of the Rio Grande, while the city of McAllen is located in the American state of Texas, directly north across the bank of the Rio Grande. This area has a population of roughly 1,500,000, making it the largest and most populous in the state of Tamaulipas, and third-most populous on the US–Mexico border.

The Reynosa–McAllen area has been one of the fastest-growing urban areas in the United States in recent years.

== Municipalities and counties ==
- Reynosa Municipality
- Río Bravo Municipality
- Hidalgo County, Texas

== Communities ==
Note: Principal cities are bolded.

=== Cities in Mexico ===
- **Reynosa**
- **Río Bravo**
- **Nuevo Progreso**

=== Cities in the U.S. ===
- Alamo
- Alton
- Donna
- Edcouch
- **Edinburg**
- Elsa
- Granjeno
- Hidalgo
- La Joya
- La Villa
- **McAllen**
- Mercedes
- **Mission**
- Palmhurst
- Palmview
- Peñitas
- **Pharr**
- Progreso
- Progreso Lakes
- San Juan
- Sullivan City
- Weslaco

=== Census-designated places ===
Note: All census-designated places are unincorporated.

- Abram-Perezville
- Alton North
- Cesar Chavez
- Citrus City
- Cuevitas
- Doffing
- Doolittle
- Havana
- Heidelberg
- Indian Hills
- La Blanca
- La Homa
- Laguna Seca
- Llano Grande
- Lopezville
- Los Ebanos
- Midway North
- Midway South
- Mila Doce
- Monte Alto
- Muniz
- North Alamo
- Nurillo
- Olivarez
- Palmview South
- Relampago
- San Carlos
- San Manuel-Linn
- Scissors
- South Alamo

=== Unincorporated places ===
- Hargill, Texas
- El Gato, Texas
- Runn, Texas
- Val Verde, Hidalgo County, Texas

== See also ==
- San Diego–Tijuana
- El Paso–Juárez
- Laredo–Nuevo Laredo
- Metropolitan area of Tampico
- Matamoros–Brownsville metropolitan area
- List of Texas metropolitan areas
- Metropolitan areas of Mexico
- Transnational conurbations Mexico/US
