= U.S. Route 83 Business (McAllen, Texas) =

Business route in Texas

Business U.S. Highway 83
- Business US 83 highlighted in red

Route information
- Maintained by TxDOT
- Length: 45.889 mi (73.851 km)
- Existed: January 14, 1991–present

Major junctions
- West end: I-2 / US 83 near La Joya
- I-2 / US 83 in Peñitas; I-2 / US 83 in Mission; I-2 / US 83 in Pharr; US 281 in Pharr
- East end: I-2 / I-69E / US 77 / US 83 in Harlingen

Location
- Country: United States
- State: Texas

Highway system
- United States Numbered Highway System; List; Special; Divided; Highways in Texas; Interstate; US; State; Former; Toll; Loops; Spurs; FM/RM; Park; Rec

Business US Route 83-S (Bus. US 83-S) is a business loop of US 83 in the Lower Rio Grande Valley region of Texas. The highway serves as the main street for many communities in the area, such as McAllen, Mission, San Juan, Alamo, and more. This is the longest business loop in Texas, traveling almost 47 miles and is the third longest bannered US highway in the state; only US 90 Alternate and US 77 Alternate are longer.

== Route description ==
Bus. US 83-S begins at Interstate 2/US 83 in Harlingen, near the interchange with Interstate 69E/US 77. Leaving the city, the highway serves the town of La Feria, before entering into Mercedes. In the city of Weslaco, the highway passes by the South Texas College - Mid-Valley Campus. Bus. US 83-S next passes through the towns of Donna, Alamo, and San Juan before entering Pharr. In Pharr, the highway intersects US 281, just south of Interstate 69C. Crossing I-2/US 83 for the first time since Harlingen, Bus. US 83-S enters into the city of McAllen. The highway serves as the major east-west road for the city, traveling directly through the city center. In Mission, the highway splits into a one way street, with northbound traffic traveling on Tom Landry Street and southbound on 9th Street. In western Mission, the highway crosses I-2/US 83 again. After the intersection with FM 2062, development along the route begins to drop, traveling mainly through more rural areas of the city. Bus. US 83-S ends at I-2/US 83 on the eastern edge of Peñitas, where I-2 also ends.

== History ==
The highway was formally signed as Loop 374 until 1991.

=== Loop 374 ===
State Highway Loop 374
- Location: Hidalgo and Cameron counties
- Existed: March 20, 1963–January 14, 1991

Texas State Highway Loop 374 is a former state highway loop that was located in Hidalgo and Cameron counties.

Loop 374 was designated in 1963, running from US 83 near the west city limit of Mission, eastward along the old location of US 83 to US 83 near the west city limit of Harlingen. The highway was extended 5.5 miles (8.9 km) west of Mission to US 83 in 1967. Loop 374 was re-routed through Mission in 1987, with westbound traffic being re-routed onto Mayberry Road and Tom Landry Street near the town's central business district. The highway was cancelled and re-designated as Bus. US 83 in 1991.

== Junction list ==
County	Location	mi	km	Destinations	Notes
Starr				Future I-2 east / US 83	Proposed; future temporary western terminus of I-2
Hidalgo		0.0	0.0	I-2 east / US 83	I-2 exit 123; temporary western terminus of I-2
Hidalgo	La Joya	2.8	4.5	FM 2221 north	
Hidalgo	Peñitas	5.7	9.2	FM 1427 south (Main Street) / Liberty Boulevard	
Hidalgo	Peñitas	6.2	10.0	I-2 east / US 83 east	I-2 exit 128A; access via US 83 Spur
Hidalgo	Palmview	9.0	14.5	FM 492 north (Goodwin Road)	
Hidalgo	Palmview	10.3	16.6	FM 2062 south (Bentsen Palm Drive) – Bentsen-Rio Grande Valley State Park	
Hidalgo	Mission	11.8	19.0	I-2 / US 83 / Inspiration Road	I-2 exit 134
Hidalgo	Mission	13.3	21.4	SH 107 (Conway Avenue)	
Hidalgo	Mission	15.8	25.4	FM 494 (Shary Road)	
Hidalgo	McAllen	17.3	27.8	FM 2220 (Ware Road)	
Hidalgo	McAllen	18.4	29.6	FM 1926 north (North 23rd Street) Spur 115 south (South 23rd Street) – McAllen International Airport	
Hidalgo	McAllen	19.3	31.1	SH 336 (10th Street) – Airport	
Hidalgo	McAllen	20.4	32.8	FM 2061 north (McColl Road)	West end of FM 2061 overlap
Hidalgo	McAllen–Pharr line	21.0	33.8	I-2 / US 83 FM 3362 north (North Jackson Road) / FM 2061 south (South Jackson Road)	East end of FM 2061 overlap; I-2 exit 144; access to westbound I-2/US 83 via FM 2061
Hidalgo	Pharr	22.2	35.7	US 281 (Cage Boulevard) – Edinburg, Reynosa	
Hidalgo	Alamo	26.1	42.0	FM 907 (Alamo Road)	
Hidalgo	Donna	28.6	46.0	FM 1423 north (Val Verde Road)	West end of FM 1423 overlap
Hidalgo	Donna	29.1	46.8	FM 1423 south (Valley View Road)	East end of FM 1423 overlap
Hidalgo	Donna	30.5	49.1	Spur 433 north (Main Street)	
Hidalgo	Donna	31.2	50.2	FM 493 (Salinas Avenue)	
Hidalgo	Weslaco	34.5	55.5	FM 88 (Texas Boulevard)	
Hidalgo	Weslaco	36.5	58.7	FM 1015 – Edcouch, Intl Bridge	
Hidalgo		37.5	60.4	Spur 31 north (Mile 2 West Road)	
Hidalgo	Mercedes	39.3	63.2	FM 491 north (Texas Avenue) – La Villa	West end of FM 491 overlap
Hidalgo	Mercedes	40.0	64.4	FM 491 south – Intl Bridge	East end of FM 491 overlap
Hidalgo		41.6	66.9	FM 1425 north (Mile 2 East Road)	
Cameron	Bixby	42.8	68.9	FM 2556 south	West end of FM 2556 overlap
Cameron		43.4	69.8	FM 2556 north	East end of FM 2556 overlap
Cameron	La Feria	45.0	72.4	FM 506 (Main Street)	
Cameron	La Feria	45.6	73.4	FM 733 north (Kansas City Road)	
Cameron	Harlingen	47.7	76.8	FM 800 (Bass Boulevard)	
Cameron	Harlingen	51.1	82.2	I-2 west / US 83 to I-69E / US 77 / Spur 54 east	I-2 exit 174
1.000 mi = 1.609 km; 1.000 km = 0.621 mi: Concurrency terminus; Proposed
