= Jimmy Carter Early College High School =

School in La Joya, Texas, United States

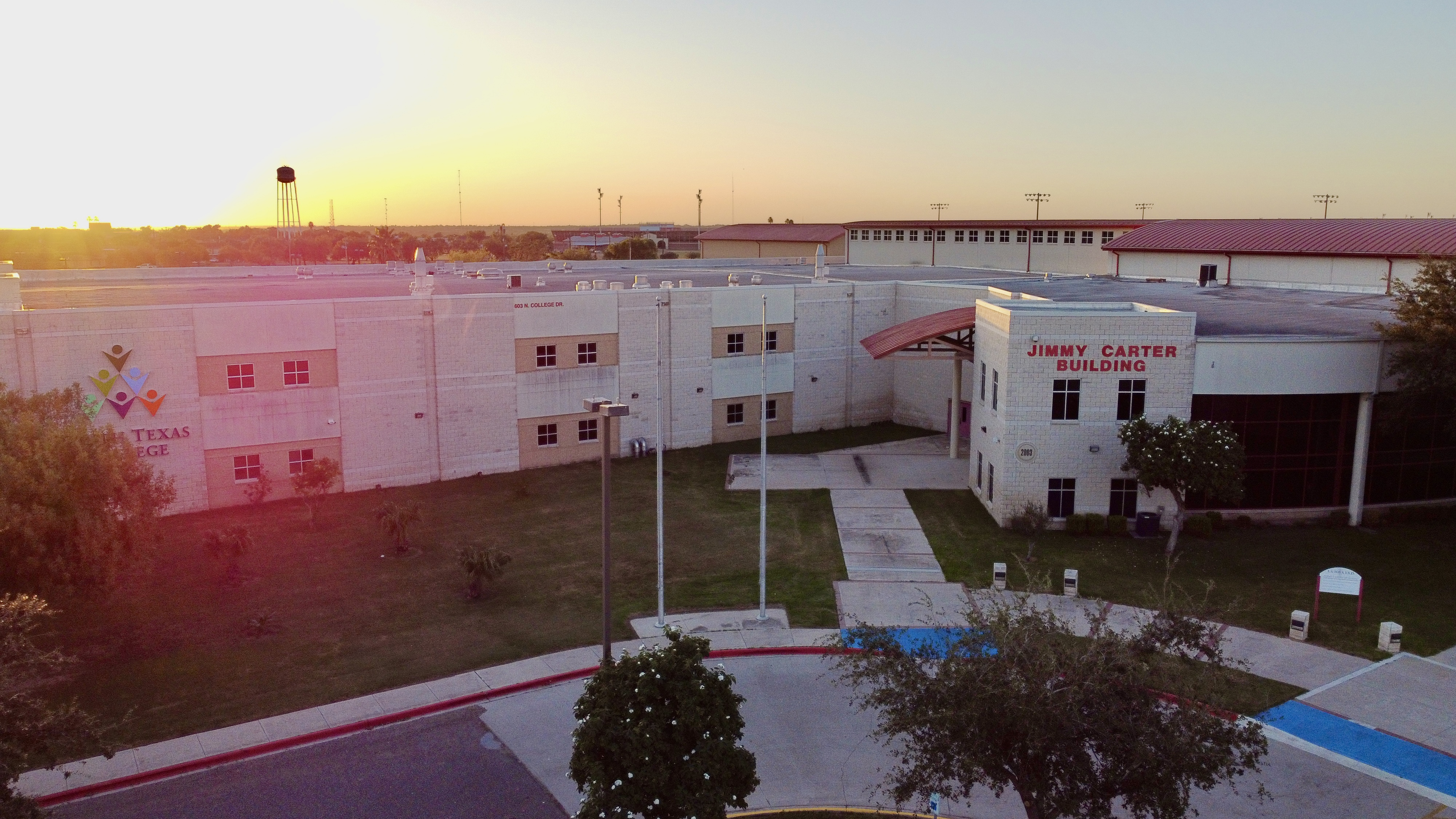

Location
- 603 N. College Dr. La Joya, Hidalgo, Texas 78560; United States; 26.2509°N 98.4764°W

Information
- Former names: College Transition Academy
- School type: Public
- Established: 2010
- School district: La Joya Independent School District
- Principal: Cassandra Rodriguez
- Grades: 9–12
- Enrollment: ≈1100
- Student to teacher ratio: ≈30:1
- Colors: Red and Gold
- Mascot: Red wolf
- USNWR ranking: 476 National, 67 Texas
- Publication: Red Gold News
- Website: jcechs.lajoyaisd.com

Jimmy Carter Early College High School is located in La Joya, Texas, and is part of the La Joya Independent School District.

== History ==
During the 2010–2011 academic year, La Joya Independent School District launched the College Transition Academy, inspired by the Early College High School concept. After achieving recognition as an "Exemplary" campus by the Texas Education Agency, it partnered with South Texas College and earned "Early College High School" status and was renamed Jimmy Carter Early College High School.

In January 2025, the La Joya Independent School District Board of Managers approved a plan to consolidate its specialty early college high schools into a single institution. Under the plan, beginning in the 2025–2026 school year, Jimmy Carter Early College High School became the district’s sole early college high school. Students from La Joya Early College High School, Thelma Salinas Early College High School, and the Academy of Health Science Professions were automatically granted the option to continue their studies at the consolidated Jimmy Carter campus if they wished to remain in the early college environment. The consolidation also involved staffing adjustments across all four campuses. The district applied Policy DFFB (LOCAL), which governs employee placement and reductions in force during program changes.

== Student population ==
During the 2021–2022 academic year, the school had a student population of 358. Of these students, 77.9% were identified as at risk, and 40.5% were part of bilingual or English language learning programs

Beginning in the 2025–2026 academic year, the school’s enrollment increased following the consolidation of multiple early college high schools within the district into a single campus Updated enrollment figures indicate the campus now serves significantly more students than in previous years which is around 1,500 https://myrgv.com/featured/2025/01/16/la-joya-isd-consolidates-early-college-high-schools-associate-degree-programs/

== School designations ==
- In 2018 the school received the National Blue Ribbon Award.
- In 2025, Jimmy Carter Early College reached the U.S. News & World Report Public High School Rankings at #976 among high schools nationwide and #112 among Texas high schools.*

== Academic programs ==
- Advanced Placement (AP) Courses
- Dual Credit Courses
- Early College High School

== Dual-enrollment partnership ==
Jimmy Carter Early College has established a Memorandum of Understanding (MOU) with South Texas College. This partnership offers dual enrollment courses, enabling students to attain an associate degree in line with the early college model. Students at Jimmy Carter Early College can attain various associate degrees:

- Associate of Science in Interdisciplinary Studies
- Associate of Arts in Interdisciplinary Studies
- Associate of Arts in Criminal Justice
- Associate of Arts in Teaching (Generalist & Secondary)
