= R. J. Alaniz =

American baseball player (born 1991)

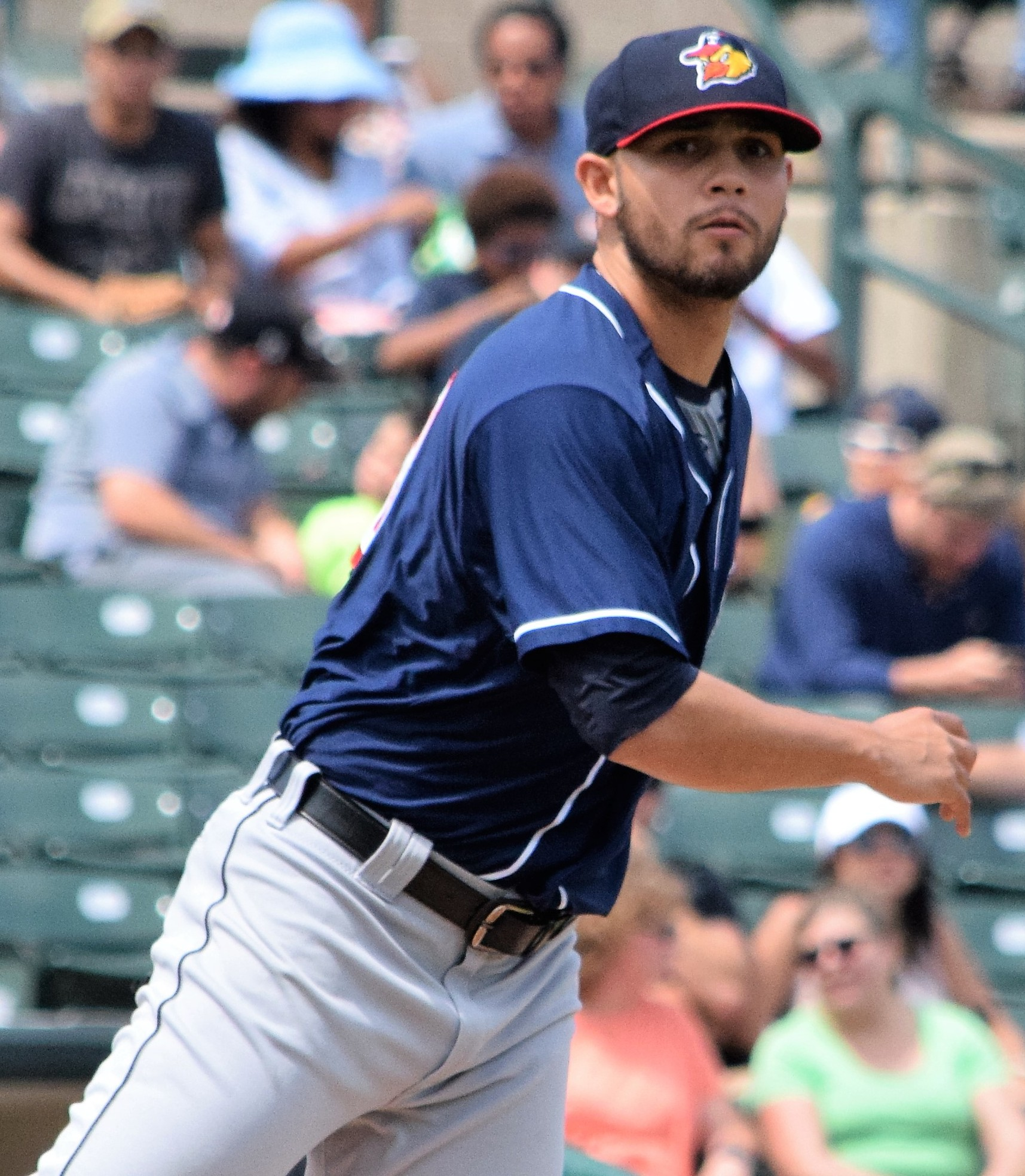
- Alaniz with the Toledo Mud Hens in 2017

Acereros de Monclova – No. 29
- Pitcher
- Born: June 14, 1991 (age 35); McAllen, Texas, U.S.
- Bats: Right Throws: Right

MLB debut
- April 12, 2019, for the Seattle Mariners

MLB statistics (through 2021 season)
- Win–loss record: 1–0
- Earned run average: 8.35
- Strikeouts: 16
- Stats at Baseball Reference

Teams
- Seattle Mariners (2019); Cincinnati Reds (2019, 2021)

Ruben "R.J." Alaniz (born June 14, 1991) is an American professional baseball pitcher for the Acereros de Monclova of the Mexican League. He has previously played in Major League Baseball (MLB) for the Seattle Mariners and Cincinnati Reds.

== Professional career ==
Alaniz was born in McAllen, Texas and attended Juarez-Lincoln High School in La Joya, Texas.

=== Houston Astros ===
He was signed as an undrafted free agent by the Houston Astros on August 14, 2009, after participating in a tryout camp run by scout Rusty Pendergrass. He was signed for $160,000, with Pendergrass and scout Clarence Johns claiming Alaniz has the "stuff to be a major league starter." He began his professional career the next year. With the Greeneville Astros in 2010, he was 6–4 with a 4.21 ERA and the following year, he was 7–10 with a 4.44 mark for the Lexington Legends. In 2012, Alaniz went 6–2 with a 5.04 ERA for the Lancaster JetHawks and in 2013, he was 9–9 with a 4.53 mark for the Corpus Christi Hooks. He was 1–1 with a 6.64 ERA for the Corpus Christi Hooks in 2014 before being suspended 50 games for using a drug of abuse in late August. It was his second suspension. Alaniz was once rated as having the best curveball in the Astros system and had been named among the club's best prospects. He appeared in major league spring training in 2012. He returned in 2015 to go 6–4 with a 4.55 ERA for the Hooks. he became a free agent following the season

=== Detroit Tigers ===
Alaniz signed a minor league contract with the Detroit Tigers organization on December 3, 2015. He split the 2016 season between the Erie SeaWolves and the Toledo Mud Hens, accumulating a 4–4 record with a 2.69 ERA in 73 innings. In 2017, he again split the year between Erie and Toledo, accumulating a 3–3 record with a 2.30 ERA in 70 1/3 innings. He elected free agency following the season on November 6, 2017.

=== Tampa Bay Rays ===
On December 14, 2017, Alaniz signed a minor league contract with the Tampa Bay Rays organization. He split the 2018 season between the rookie–level GCL Rays, the High–A Charlotte Stone Crabs, the Double–A Montgomery Biscuits, and the Triple–A Durham Bulls. He accumulated a 3–4 record with a 3.38 ERA in 42 2/3 innings. Alaniz elected free agency following the season on November 2.

=== Seattle Mariners ===
On November 15, 2018, Alaniz signed a major league contract with the Seattle Mariners. He opened the 2019 season with the Tacoma Rainiers.

On April 12, 2019, he was recalled to the major leagues for the first time. He made his debut that night, allowing four runs over two innings of relief. In 4 games with Seattle, Alaniz struggled to a 20.25 ERA.

=== Cincinnati Reds ===
On May 31, 2019, he was claimed off waivers by the Cincinnati Reds and optioned to the Louisville Bats. Alaniz recorded a 5.40 ERA in 8 games with Reds. On December 9, Alaniz was outrighted off the Reds 40-man roster.

On September 15, 2020, Alaniz was selected to the major league roster. Alaniz did not make an appearance for Cincinnati in 2020 and was non-tendered by the Reds on December 2. On December 11, Alaniz re-signed with the Reds on a minor league contract. He was assigned to Louisville to begin the 2021 season and posted a 2.25 ERA in 21 appearances. On July 19, 2021, Alaniz was selected to the active roster. In 3 appearances for the Reds in 2021, Alaniz posted a 3.38 ERA with 3 strikeouts. On September 22, 2021, the Reds designated Alaniz for assignment. On October 6, Alaniz elected free agency.

=== Atlanta Braves ===
On January 24, 2022, Alaniz signed with the Acereros de Monclova of the Mexican League for the 2022 season. Prior to the start of the Mexican League season, on March 20, Alaniz signed a minor league contract with the Atlanta Braves organization. In 20 games for the Triple-A Gwinnett Stripers, Alaniz logged a 3–1 record and 3.81 ERA with 41 strikeouts in 26.0 innings of work. He elected free agency on November 10.

=== Acereros de Monclova ===
On February 3, 2023, Alaniz signed with the Acereros de Monclova of the Mexican League. In 23 relief outings, he posted a 4.01 ERA with 20 strikeouts and one save across 24 2/3 innings of work.

Alaniz made 35 appearances for Monclova in 2024, posting a 4–3 record and 2.31 ERA with 39 strikeouts and 10 saves across 35 innings of relief.

Alaniz re-signed with Monclova for the 2025 season his third with the team. He finished the season having appeared in 28 relief appearances, posting a 3–0 record and 4.05 ERA with 41 strikeouts and 12 saves.
