= Interstate 2 =

Interstate Highway in South Texas

Interstate 2
- I-2 highlighted in red

Route information
- Maintained by TxDOT
- Length: 46.80 mi (75.32 km)
- Existed: 2013–present
- NHS: Entire route

Major junctions
- West end: US 83 / Bus. US 83 near Sullivan City
- SH 107 in Mission; SH 336 in McAllen; I-69C / US 281 in Pharr
- East end: I-69E / US 77 / US 83 in Harlingen

Location
- Country: United States
- State: Texas
- Counties: Hidalgo, Cameron

Highway system
- Interstate Highway System; Main; Auxiliary; Suffixed; Business; Future; Highways in Texas; Interstate; US; State; Former; Toll; Loops; Spurs; FM/RM; Park; Rec
← PR 1	→ SH 2

Interstate 2 (I-2 (Note: Some sources use "IH-2", as "IH" is an abbreviation used by TxDOT for Interstate Highways.)) is a partially completed Interstate Highway running through the Lower Rio Grande Valley of South Texas. It begins at an interchange with Showers Road (SH 364) in Palmview and heads eastward before terminating at I-69E/US 77/US 83 in Harlingen. A US 83 bypass, separate from I-2, was constructed to interstate standards around Peñitas, La Joya, and Sullivan City and was completed in phases from 2023 to 2024.

For its entire length, I-2 runs concurrently with US 83. I-2 also parallels Mexican Federal Highway 2 (Fed. 2), another major east–west route that traces the Mexico–US border along the Mexican side of the Rio Grande. It was signed as an Interstate in 2013.

TxDOT studies have explored the possibility of extending I-2 along the US 83 corridor to a western terminus of Laredo. The potential extension is a part of broader planning for an expansion of the Interstate System into southern Texas that includes the three branches of I-69 throughout the Rio Grande Valley, as I-2 intersects with I-69E in Harlingen and I-69C in Pharr. If extended to Laredo, it would terminate at the future I-69W corridor as well. This complex of Interstate Highways does not currently connect to the rest of the system, with buildout of the Rio Grande Valley freeways providing connections to I-35 and I-37.

== Route description ==
I-2 begins at an interchange with Showers Road/SH 364 in Palmview. The Interstate heads eastward as a six-lane freeway through the Lower Rio Grande Valley. The route curves southeastward around Mission and McAllen to the south, running near McAllen Miller International Airport, through the urbanized McAllen-Edinburg-Mission Metropolitan Area in the Rio Grande Valley. The route curves northeastward around Pharr, where it intersects with I-69C/US 281 north of the city center. This is the southern terminus of I-69C, and provides a key connection to US 281, providing a key connection to northern cities such as San Antonio. Continuing eastward, the route passes by San Juan, Alamo, Donna, Weslaco, Mercedes, and La Feria roughly paralleling Bus. US 83. The route ends at an interchange with I-69E/US 77/US 83 in Harlingen.

== History ==
On April 1, 2013, the Texas Department of Transportation (TxDOT) applied to use the I-2 designation on US 83 from Palmview to Harlingen. Approved by the American Association of State Highway and Transportation Officials at their May meeting, this 46.8-mile-long (75.3 km) freeway was already constructed as an Interstate-grade limited-access facility. It connects with I-69E at Harlingen; and likewise with I-69C in the city of Pharr.

The Federal Highway Administration approved the designation on May 24, 2013, and TxDOT followed suit on May 30, 2013. This action finalized the designation of I-2. The signage was installed in mid-2013.

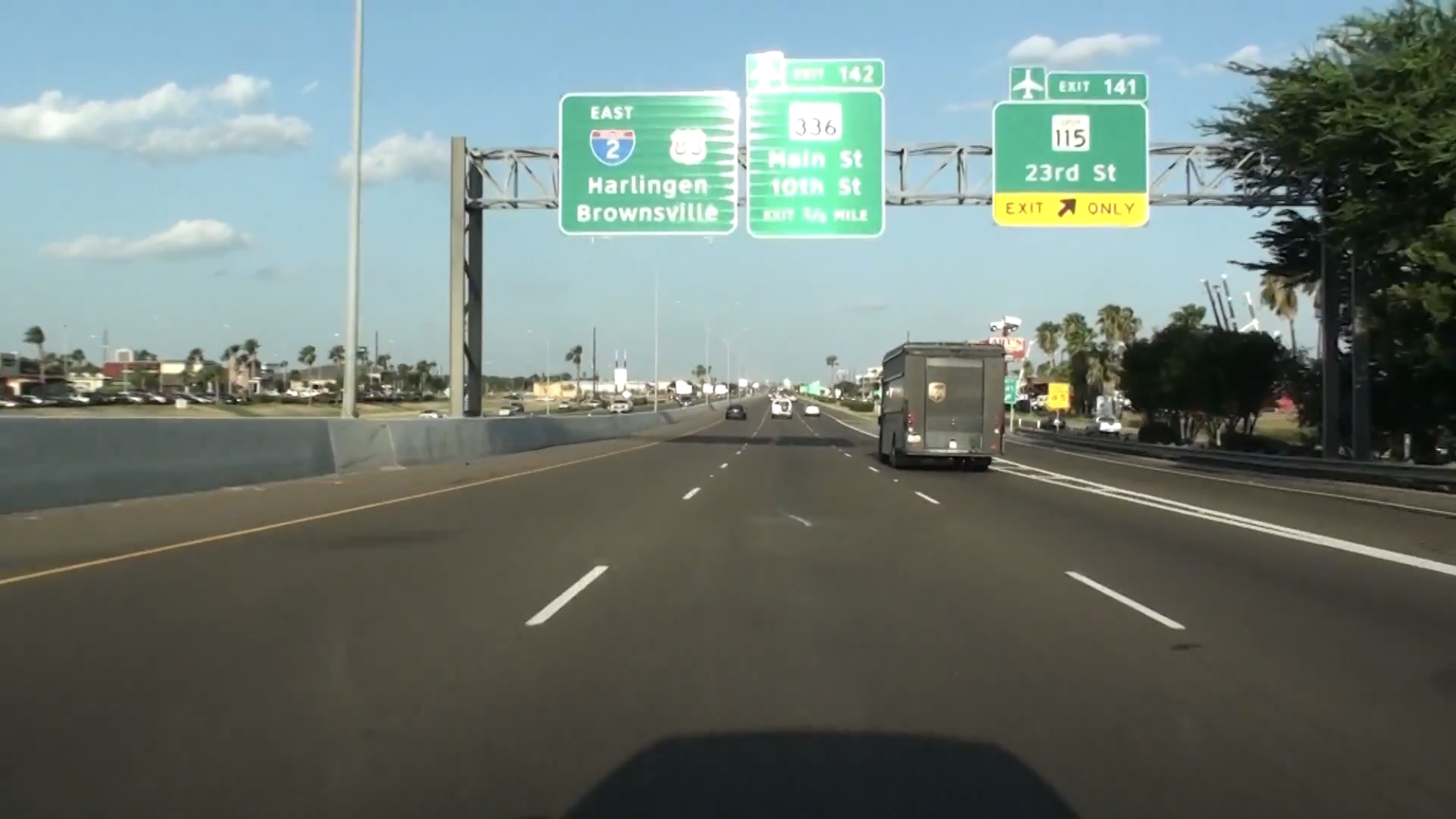
Interstate 2 in 2020

Due to increasing congestion, the US 83 La Joya Relief Route was built, a nine-mile (14 km) bypass built to interstate standards, bypassing Penitas, La Joya, and Sullivan City in three phases. Two phases were set for completion in May 2023, although this did not occur until July 2023. Traffic opening was delayed until August. Two phases of the segment from west of Palmview to east of Sullivan City were estimated to cost $183-197 million according to TxDOT.

A portion of the US 83 La Joya relief route opened in August 2023. It opened the eastbound and westbound US 83 main lanes and frontage roads from the US 83 west connector in Peñitas —located east of Showers Road — to Jara Chinas Road as well as the westbound US 83 frontage road between FM 2221 and the US 83 East connector in Sullivan City. The final phase, which built the main lanes west of FM 2221, was completed in early 2024. The total cost for construction was estimated at $197 million.

=== Interstate 69 (Rio Grande Valley Interstate Network) ===
Due to the nature of the Interstate 69 Corridor and branches, they have always been linked to the I-2 project, as a part of the interstate network in the Rio Grande Valley. When the Federal Highway Administration approved the I-2 designation on May 24, 2013, and TxDOT followed suit on May 30, 2013, the designations of the sections of I-69E from Brownsville to Raymondville, I-69C from Pharr north to the end of the US 281 freeway facility near Edinburg, and I-369 along a short segment of US 59 freeway west of Texarkana, which will be part of the proposed 115-mile (185 km) connector between the main I-69 trunk in Tenaha and Texarkana were all also finalized. These approvals added over 100 miles (160 km) to the Interstate Highway System in the Rio Grande Valley.

The cluster consisting of the recently designated portions of I-2, I-69C, and I-69E in the Rio Grande Valley is not connected to the national Interstate network. This situation is slated to be remedied by scheduled projects to complete I-69E along US 77 between Raymondville and Kingsville and to connect to I-37 west of Corpus Christi. Environmental Protection Agency approval for the expansion of the US 77 alignment to Interstate standards, including bypasses of the towns along the 91-mile (146 km) routing, was obtained through a Finding of No Significant Impact statement issued in July 2012. Gradual work continues on the segments, consisting of upgrades to existing 4-lane highway, widening, and bypass relief routes, to ultimately convert the route to I-69E.

== Future ==
In August of 2023, TxDOT completed the US 83 Corridor Study, which evaluated improvements to the US 83 corridor from the I-2/US-83 junction in Palmview to the I-69W/US 59/Loop 20 junction in Laredo. The corridor follows US 83 before shifting to Loop 20 in Laredo and terminating at US 59 (Future I-69W corridor). The study, which included collecting and analyzing data and requesting public feedback, began in April 2022 and was completed in August 2023. Part of the study looked into another relief route in Starr County.

== Exit list ==
The exit numbers are set up to reflect the likely future western terminus of I-2, which would be in Laredo.

County	Location	mi	km	Exit	Destinations	Notes
Hidalgo		0.00	0.00	–	US 83 – Sullivan City, Rio Grande City	Temporary western terminus
Hidalgo		2.00	3.22	123	Bus. US 83	Opened August 2023
Hidalgo		3.30	5.31	124	US 83 (Frontage Road)	Opened August 2023
Hidalgo	La Joya	5.70	9.17	126	FM 2221 (Jara Chinas Road)	Opened August 2023; signed as exit 125 eastbound
Hidalgo	Peñitas	7.10	11.43	127A	Tom Gill Road	Opened August 2023
Hidalgo		7.50	12.07	127B	US 83 (Frontage Road)	Opened August 2023
Hidalgo		8.10	13.04	128A	Bus. US 83 – Peñitas, La Joya	Opened August 2023
Hidalgo		8.40	13.52	128B	US 83 (Frontage Road)	Opened 2022
Hidalgo		0.00	0.00	130	Showers Road	Western terminus; No exit number eastbound.
Hidalgo	Palmview	1.50	2.41	131	FM 492 (Goodwin Road) / Abram Road	
Hidalgo	Palmview	3.36	5.41	133	SH 364 (La Homa Road) / Bentsen Palm Drive	
Hidalgo	Mission	4.67	7.52	134	Bus. US 83 / Inspiration Road	
Hidalgo	Mission	5.28	8.50	135	Los Ebanos Road	
Hidalgo	Mission	6.42	10.33	136	SH 107 north / FM 1016 south (Conway Avenue)	
Hidalgo	Mission	7.44	11.97	137	FM 396 (Bryan Road, Anzalduas Highway)	
Hidalgo	Mission	8.92	14.36	138	FM 494 (Shary Road)	
Hidalgo	McAllen	10.47	16.85	140	FM 2220 (Ware Road)	
Hidalgo	McAllen	11.50	18.51	141A	Spur 115 (23rd Street) – Airport	
Hidalgo	McAllen	11.91	19.17	141B	Main Street, Bicentennial Boulevard – Airport	
Hidalgo	McAllen	12.45	20.04	142	SH 336 (10th Street) / 2nd Street	2nd Street not signed eastbound
Hidalgo	McAllen	12.55	20.20	143A	2nd Street	Eastbound exit only
Hidalgo	McAllen	12.90	20.76	143B	McColl Road, Jackson Avenue	
Hidalgo	McAllen–Pharr line	13.57	21.84	144	Bus. US 83 / FM 2061 to FM 3362 (Jackson Road)	
Hidalgo	Pharr	17.22	27.71	146A	US 281 south – Pharr	Signed as exit 146B westbound
Hidalgo	Pharr	17.22	27.71	146B	I-69C north / US 281 north – Edinburg	Southern terminus of I-69C; I-69C exits 1A-B southbound; tri-stack interchange; signed as exit 146A westbound
Hidalgo	Pharr–San Juan line	18.24	29.35	147A	Veterans Boulevard	Formerly I Road
Hidalgo	San Juan	18.72	30.13	147B	FM 1426 to FM 2557 – San Juan	
Hidalgo	San Juan	20.40	32.83	149	Cesar Chavez Road	
Hidalgo	Alamo	21.15	34.04	150A	FM 907 (Alamo Road)	
Hidalgo	Alamo	21.90	35.24	150B	Tower Road	
Hidalgo	Donna	22.35	35.97	151	SH 68 north	Future southern terminus of SH 68
Hidalgo	Donna	23.41	37.67	152	FM 1423 (Val Verde Road)	
Hidalgo	Donna	24.66	39.69	153	Hutto Road	
Hidalgo	Donna	25.52	41.07	154	Spur 433 (Main Street)	
Hidalgo	Donna	26.23	42.21	155A	FM 493 (Salinas Boulevard)	
Hidalgo		27.03	43.50	155B	Victoria Road, Midway Road	Midway Road not signed westbound
Hidalgo	Weslaco	28.42	45.74	157	Westgate Drive, Mile 6 West Road	
Hidalgo	Weslaco	29.42	47.35	158	FM 88 (Texas Boulevard)	
Hidalgo	Weslaco	30.45	49.00	159	Airport Drive, Pike Boulevard	Serves Mid Valley Airport
Hidalgo	Weslaco	31.64	50.92	160	FM 1015 (International Boulevard)	
Hidalgo	Mercedes	32.79	52.77	161	Spur 31 (Mile 2 West Road)	
Hidalgo	Mercedes	34.19	55.02	163A	Vermont Avenue	
Hidalgo	Mercedes	34.64	55.75	163B	FM 491 (Texas Avenue)	
Hidalgo	Mercedes	35.87	57.73	164	Mile 1 East Road	
Hidalgo	Mercedes	36.88	59.35	165	FM 1425 (Mile 2 East Road)	
Hidalgo–Cameron county line	Mercedes–La Feria line	37.87	60.95	166	Mile 3 East Road	No direct westbound exit (signed at exit 167)
Cameron	La Feria	39.09	62.91	167	FM 2556 (Cantu Road)	
Cameron	La Feria	39.52	63.60	168	Rabb Road	No direct eastbound exit (signed at exit 167)
Cameron	La Feria	40.29	64.84	169	FM 506 – La Feria, Santa Rosa	
Cameron		40.97	65.93	170	FM 733 (Kansas City Road); White Ranch Road	FM 733 (Kansas City Road) not signed westbound
Cameron	Harlingen	42.93	69.09	171	FM 800 (Bass Boulevard)	
Cameron	Harlingen	43.90	70.65	172	Altas Palmas Road	
Cameron	Harlingen	44.75	72.02	173	FM 3195 (Stuart Place Road)	
Cameron	Harlingen	46.50	74.83	174	Bus. US 83 / Lewis Lane	Bus. US 83 not signed westbound
Cameron	Harlingen	47.04	75.70	175	Downtown – Tyler Avenue; Dixieland Road; Bass Pro Drive	Eastbound exit and westbound entrance; access via Bus. US 83; I-69E exit 26C
Cameron	Harlingen	47.31	76.14	176	I-69E north / US 77 north – Raymondville, Corpus Christi	Eastbound left exit and westbound entrance; I-69E exit 26B; serves Valley International Airport
Cameron	Harlingen	47.31	76.14		I-69E south / US 77 south / US 83 south – Brownsville	Eastern terminus; eastern end of US 83 concurrency; I-69E exit 26B
1.000 mi = 1.609 km; 1.000 km = 0.621 mi: Concurrency terminus; Incomplete access; Unopened
