= Rio Bank =

Micro Bank

- Company type: Private company
- Industry: Financial services
- Founded: 1985; 40 years ago
- Headquarters: McAllen, Texas, United States
- Area served: Rio Grande Valley (Texas)
- Products: Banking services
- Website: www.rio.bank

Rio Bank is an American community bank that is owned and headquartered in McAllen, Texas. The bank has 16 locations in Texas across the Rio Grande Valley. It serves the communities along the Mexican border in deep South Texas and central Texas with many of the bank's customers being Mexican.

== History ==
The bank was established in February 1985, with Rio Bank opening its doors as a retail oriented bank primarily catering to consumers for both deposit and loan business.

In 1995, the bank opened its second banking center in North McAllen, Texas. In 2002, the bank opened two new banking centers one in San Juan, Texas and the other in Palmview, Texas. In 2005, the bank opened a new banking center in Brownsville, Texas and in 2009 opened a new banking center in Weslaco, Texas.

In 2018, Rio Bank acquired Elsa State Bank & Trust. The merger increased Rio Bank's current $350 million in assets by an additional $200 million. The merger added locations that Rio Bank previously did not service, such as Starr County, Texas and Cameron County, Texas.

In 2019, it complete its new corporate headquarters building and moved their operations to the new location.

In April 2023, Rio Bank and the Texas Bankers Association sued the Consumer Financial Protection Bureau and then-director Rohit Chopra over the agency's rule mandating that lenders collect and report demographic information on small business loans.
