= Palmview High School =

Location
- 3901 North La Homa Road; Palmview, Texas 78574; United States; 26.258785°N 98.359467°W

Information
- School type: Public, high school
- Motto: "Here at Palmview High School we say: GO LOBOS!"
- Founded: 2008
- School district: La Joya ISD
- Principal: Ciro Gonzalez
- Staff: 140.47 (FTE)
- Grades: 9–12
- Enrollment: 2,153 (2023-2024)
- Student to teacher ratio: 15.33
- Language: English
- Campus: Suburban
- Colors: Red and Black
- Mascot: Lobos
- Feeder schools: Ann Richards Middle School; Irene Garcia Middle School; Memorial Middle School
- Sister schools: La Joya High School; Juarez-Lincoln High School
- Website: https://phs.lajoyaisd.com/

Palmview High School is a public senior high school in the La Homa census-designated place in unincorporated Hidalgo County, Texas, with a Mission postal address, and a part of the La Joya Independent School District.

Palmview is a Texas UIL Division 5A high school named after the city of Palmview. The school is home to students that live on the east side of La Joya ISD.

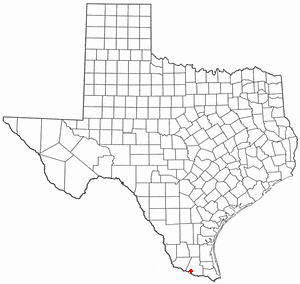
Map of Texas with a red dot on Palmview.

Palmview High serves sections of Alton, Mission, and Palmview, as well as parts of the census-designated places of Doffing, La Homa, Palmview South, Perezville, and West Sharyland.

== Foundation ==
Due to increasing population in the area, the school district, which formerly had only one high school, had to be split into three separate high schools. The 2008–2009 school year became the inaugural year for Palmview High School, and it was classified as a 6A school. The official Palmview High School campus opened in January 2009 at 2.5 miles (4 km) north La Homa Road in Mission.

== Administration ==
Principal	Years served
Mary Ann Contreras	2008–2011
Norma Garcia	2011–2012
Yvonne Ayala	2012– 2021
Lionel Perez	2021–Present

== Athletics ==
=== Lobo Football ===
The Palmview Lobos share their field with La Joya Coyotes and Juarez-Lincoln Huskies at La Joya Stadium, a 12,500-seating capacity stadium which opened in 2000. The lobos made it to playoffs in 2014 for the first time and also became bi-district champs.

=== Lady Lobo Basketball ===
The Lady Lobos are coached by Anisa Reyna and assisted by Jose Reyna, along with many other staff members who are allocated positions on the Lady Lobos Basketball staff. The Lady Lobos made the playoffs for the first time in school history in 2015.

=== Other sports ===
- Baseball
- Golf
- Softball
- Soccer
- Marching band
- Swimming
- Track and field
- Volleyball
- Weightlifting
- Wrestling
- Cross country running
- Public speaking

== Fine arts ==
=== Palmview Lobo Marching Band ===
The Palmview Lobo Band marches to the motto "The Pride of the Pack". The band has earned consecutive Sweepstakes Awards since its start as a new band program. The Lobo Band won the USSBA Group IV A State Championship in 2008. In 2014 the band advanced to the 6A Area G Marching Contest Finals. In addition, the band has earned "firsts" awards in the district: the first 4-year All state band student in the district; 2 US Army All American Marching Band Members, Winterguard State Championship.

== Other Clubs/Organizations ==
- The Lobo Times, Palmview High School's newspaper
- Palmview National Honor Society
- Palmview Media Society
- Palmview Rubies (Dance/Drill Team)
- Palmview Orchestra
- H.O.S.A. (Health Occupations Students of America)
- S.W.A.T. (Students With A Testimony)
- Lobos Computer Science Team
- Palmview HS Reading Club
- Gear Up
- GO Center
- JROTC
- F.F.A. (Future Farmers of America)
- Cosmetology
- Palmview High School Student Council
- Palmview High School Math Club
- Hispanic National Honor Society
- Palmview High School Senior Class
- G-FORCE

== New traditions ==
=== Alma mater ===
Palmview's school song, "Alma Mater", uses the music of La Joya High School's original Alma Mater. THIS SONG WAS WRITTEN BY AKZA RIOS MUNSEY AND COMPOSED BY MR.FLORES.

=== Texas Fight ===
Palmview's fight song, "Texas Fight", is the University of Texas fight song.
