= La Joya Independent School District =

School district in Texas, United States

Coordinates: 26.2525°N 98.4772°W

Address
- 201 East Expressway 83 La Joya, Texas, 78560; United States

District information
- Grades: PK–12
- Schools: 37
- NCES District ID: 4826130

Students and staff
- Students: 23,998 (2023–2024)
- Teachers: 1,687.38 (on an FTE basis)
- Student–teacher ratio: 14.22:1

Other information
- Website: www.lajoyaisd.com

La Joya Independent School District is a school district headquartered in La Joya, Texas, United States.

The La Joya Independent School District, located in the western portion of Hidalgo County, Texas consist of more than 226 square miles (590 km^{2}) stretching west of Mission (small portions of Mission are in LJISD) to Sullivan City, including the smaller communities of La Joya, Palmview, and Peñitas. Boundaries extend from the United States border formed by the Rio Grande to the 13-mile (21 km) line near McCook.

Incorporated places served by LJISD include La Joya, Palmview, Penitas, Sullivan City, and sections of Alton and Mission. La Joya ISD also serves other unincorporated communities including Abram, Citrus City, Cuevitas, Doffing, Havana, La Homa, Los Ebanos, Palmview South, and Perezville, as well as portions of West Sharyland.

In 2009, the school district was rated "academically acceptable" by the Texas Education Agency.

The Texas Education Agency's college readiness performance data shows that only 2.4% (31 out of 1288 students) of the graduates of the class of 2010 of the La Joya school district met TEA's average performance criterion on SAT or ACT college admission tests.

Jimmy Carter Early College High School is a 2018 recipient of the U.S. Department of Education's Blue Ribbon School of Excellence award.

== District growth ==
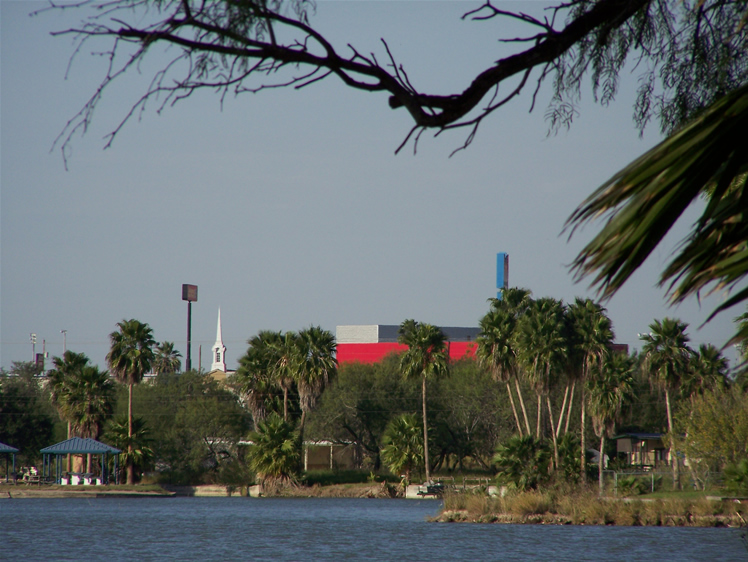
Picture taken from one of La Joya's lakes, with the red, grey, and black Alejandro "Alex" H. Saenz Performing Arts Center in the background, along with the white steeple of the Church of Jesus Christ of Latter-day Saints.

With a peak enrollment of 23,444 students for the 2004-2005 academic school year, of which Hispanic students account for over 99 percent of enrollment, La Joya ISD is one of the fastest growing school districts in Texas with an estimated increase of 1,400 students per year. Overall, La Joya ISD boasts over 30 campuses; twenty-three elementary schools, eight middle schools, four Alternative Education Centers, three "Early College" high schools, and three comprehensive high schools. La Joya ISD employs over 4,260 individuals from all across the Rio Grande Valley and some from overseas.

== History ==
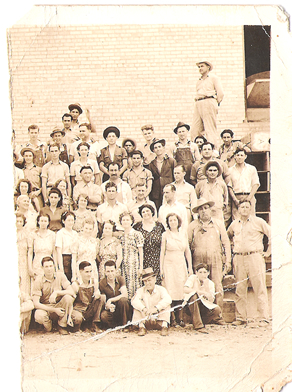
Nellie Schunior Memorial High School Being Built.

The first schools were established during the 19th century to provide educational opportunities for the people living in western Hidalgo County who did not have access to existing educational institutions. One of the first of these schoolhouses was built in Havana in 1849 when citizens from the towns and villages of Abram-Perezville (Ojo de Agua), Penitas, Tabasco (now La Joya), Havana, Los Ebanos and Cuevitas established a place of learning. Although far from the little red schoolhouse one might envision, the structure of rock and adobe sheltered the students of this area and gave them a solid education. This building would later become known as the La Joya Independent School District.

In 1993 the district was majority Hispanic, and as of that year, annually 1,000 new students enrolled in the district. Over 3,000 students were enrolled at La Joya High School. In 1992, one elementary had a growth rate of 17% and another had a growth rate of 18%. James E. Garcia of the Austin American-Statesman stated that, according to experts, birthrates in La Joya ISD were among the highest in the United States and "rival those of some undeveloped countries like Bangladesh". Garcia said that many of the new students are born in the district or more there with their parents, while some are Mexican immigrants who are legally and illegally in the United States.

In December 1993, there was a proposal for a new policy stating that all students were required to live with their parents or legal guardians so that the increasing enrollment trends would be reduced. Garcia stated that the school board was "expected" to approve the measure on Tuesday December 14, 1993, and that few of the district residents expressed opposition. Garcia wrote "While hundreds of students could be denied admission under the policy change, the proposal appears to be drawing more interest from educators and others statewide than within the school district's boundaries." Officials from the Texas Education Agency (TEA) believed that the district was violating state law by doing this. Groups favoring more rights for immigrants argued that the district was trying to prevent Mexican migrants from enrolling. Garcia stated that other school districts along the Texas-Mexico border were trying to determine if such a policy was workable.

As of 2018 it had about 30,000 students.

== Facilities ==
In 2018 it was building a school district-owned water park with financing from the district's general fund, making it the first water park in the state owned by a school district. The 90,000-square-foot (8,400 m^{2}) water park is open to the public for six days of the week. In addition LJISD built a 21,993-square-foot (2,043.2 m^{2}) natatorium, a 27-hole golf course, and four tennis courts; the district previously used City of La Joya swimming pool facilities. These developments are in the LJISD Sports and Learning Complex, in unincorporated Hidalgo County. It includes the 12,600-capacity La Joya ISD Stadium.

== Schools ==
=== High schools (grades 9–12) ===
School	Address	Principal
La Joya High School	604 N. Coyote Blvd., La Joya, TX 78560	Ricardo Estrada
Palmview High School	3901 N. La Homa Rd, Mission, TX 78572	Lionel Perez
Juarez-Lincoln High School	7801 W. Mile 7 Rd., Mission, TX 78574	Ricardo Estrada
Jimmy Carter Early College High School	603 N. Coyote Dr., La Joya, TX 78560	Claudia Gomez-Perez
Thelma Salinas STEM Early College High School	801 N. Coyote Dr., La Joya, TX 78560	Victor Rodriguez
La Joya Early College High School	604 N. Coyote Blvd., La Joya, TX 78560	Domingo Villarreal III
College & Career Center	200 W. Expressway 83, La Joya, TX 78560	Ronny Cabrera
HOPE Academy	221-A N. Stadium Dr., La Joya, TX 78560	Juan De Dios Quiroz

=== Middle schools (grades 6-8) ===
School	Address	Principal
César E. Chávez Middle School	78 Showers Rd., Mission, TX 78572	
Lorenzo De Zavala Middle School	603 N. Tabasco St., La Joya, TX 78560	
Irene M. García Middle School	933 Paula Dr., Mission, TX 78572	Santana Galvan
Memorial Middle School	2610 N. Moorefield Rd., Mission, TX 78572	Daniel Villarreal
Ann Richards Middle School	7005 Ann Richards Rd., Mission, TX 78572	Thomas Ocanas
Dr. Javier Saenz Middle School	39200 Mile 7 Road, Peñitas, TX 78576	Marena Contreras
Juan De Dios Salinas Middle School	6101 N. Bentsen Palm Dr., Mission, TX 78574	Nidia Ortiz
Domingo Trevino Middle School	301 S. Inspiration Rd., Alton, TX 78573	Jose Garcia

=== Elementary schools (grades PK-5) ===
School	Address	Principal
Rosendo Benavides Elementary School	1882 El Pinto Rd., Sullivan City, TX 78595	Juan José Olvera
Lloyd M. Bentsen Elementary School	2916 Mile 3, Mission, TX 78574	Magda S. Palacios
Enrique Camarena Elementary School	2612 N. Moorefield Rd., Mission, TX 78572	Dulce Diaz
Narciso G. Cavázos Elementary School	4563 Minnesota Rd., Mission, TX 78572	Marisa Garza
Elodia R. Chapa Elementary School	5670 Daffing Rd., Mission, TX 78572	Laura Lopez
William J. Clinton Elementary School	39202 Mile 7 Road, Peñitas, TX 78576	Sheila Mata
Kika De la Garza Elementary School	5441 La Homa Rd., Mission, TX 78572	Irene Fernandez
Díaz-Villareal Elementary School	5543 La Homa Rd., Mission, TX 78572	
José De Escandón Elementary School	700 N. Shuerbach Rd., Mission, TX 78572	
Guillermo Flores Elementary School	1913 Roque Salinas, Mission, TX 78572	Leroy Garcia
Sam Fordyce Elementary School	801 FM 886, Sullivan City, TX 78595	
Evangelina Garza Elementary School	8731 N Doffing Rd, Mission, TX 78572	Alma Perez-Campos
Henry B. Gonzalez Elementary School	3912 N. Goodwin Rd., Mission, TX 78572	Yolanda Salazar-Meave
John F. Kennedy "JFK" Elementary School	1801 Diamond Ave., Peñitas, TX 78576	
Leo J. Leo Elementary School	1625 Roque Salinas, Mission, TX 78572	Maria E. Jazinski
Dr. Palmira Mendiola Elementary School	6401 N. Abram Rd., Mission, TX 78572	Alicia Gutierrez
Dr. Americo Paredes Elementary School	5301 N. Bentsen Palm Dr., Mission, TX 78572	
Corina Peña Elementary School	4800 Liberty Blvd, Peñitas, TX 78576	Yesenia Gonzalez
Patricio Pérez Elementary School	4431 Minnosota Rd., Mission, TX 78572	Myra Trigo Ramos
E.B. Reyna Elementary School	900 E. Veterans Blvd., Mission, TX 78572	Melissa Arteaga
Juan N. Seguin Elementary School	8500 N. Western Rd., Mission, TX 78574	Alejandro Carranza
Tabasco Elementary School	223 S. Leo Ave., La Joya, TX 78560	Karen Villarreal-Leanos
Emiliano Zapata Elementary School	9100 N. La Homa, Mission, TX 78574	Rosa Gonzalez-Vela

== UIL district alignment ==
=== 2014–2016 District 30-6A ===
The new UIL realignment changed the classifications of high schools in the State of Texas. High schools, based on enrollment numbers, are divided into classifications and districts, with 6A schools being the larger schools (enrollment of 2100+). La Joya ISD will have all three comprehensive high schools in the new 6A classification, and will once again join the three McAllen ISD schools, along with long-time rival Mission CISD's Mission High School.

- La Joya ISD
  - La Joya High School Coyotes
  - Palmview High School Lobos
  - Juarez-Lincoln High School Huskies
- McAllen ISD
  - McAllen High School Bulldogs
  - McAllen Memorial High School Mustangs
  - James "Nikki" Rowe High School Warriors
- Mission CISD
  - Mission High School Eagles
