= La Joya High School =

Location
- 604 North Coyote Boulevard; La Joya, Texas 78560; United States; 26.253452°N 98.472927°W

Information
- School type: Public, High School
- Founded: 1941
- School district: La Joya ISD
- School number: (956)-323-2870
- Principal: Ricardo Estrada
- Teaching staff: 223.87 (FTE)
- Grades: 9–12
- Enrollment: 2,624 (2023-2024)
- Student to teacher ratio: 11.72
- Language: English
- Campus: Suburban
- Colors: Red and White
- Mascot: Coyote
- Communities served: Sullivan City; La Joya; Peñitas; Palmview
- Feeder schools: Lorenzo De Zavala Middle School; Cesar E. Chavez Middle School; Dr. Javier Saenz Middle School; Ann Richards Middle School
- Sister schools: Palmview High School; Juarez-Lincoln High School
- Website: ljhs.lajoyaisd.com

La Joya High School is a Texas UIL Division 6A high school in the La Joya Independent School District named after the city it resides in, La Joya. The school is home to students that live on the west and south areas of La Joya ISD.

La Joya HS serves the cities of La Joya, Peñitas, and Sullivan City, as well as the census-designated places of Abram, Cuevitas, Havana, and Los Ebanos. It also serves parts of the City of Palmview and parts of the census-designated places of Doffing, Palmview South, and Perezville.

== History ==
La Joya ISD had been home to a single high school entity since the district (then known as Tabasco ISD) erected Nellie Schunior Memorial High School in 1926, six years after the death of Nellie Leo Schunior, the first education pioneer in the district's current boundaries. La Joya High School was later created, in order to house the growing number of students that Nellie Schunior Memorial High School could not accommodate. As the years rapidly passed, the communities within the district boundaries began to flourish, and the district population exploded. La Joya High School, being the sole high school within the 226 square miles (590 km^{2}) of land, grew to enormous proportions. For a long time, La Joya High School housed 9-12 grades. Eventually, the student population grew too much and a separate Ninth Grade Campus was built adjacent to La Joya High School. In 1993 over 3,000 students were enrolled at La Joya High School, and enrollment was sharply increasing throughout the La Joya Independent School District.

== Early College High School ==
La Joya Early College High School is a designated early college established in 2012 and located within La Joya High School as a school-within-a-school. The school-within-a-school model allows students at La Joya Early College to participate in all extracurricular activities offered at La Joya High School. Dating back to its founding, the school has made use of classrooms and facilities that are part of larger host schools, at one point sharing space alongside the La Joya ISD College and Career Center, South Texas College, and Jimmy Carter Early College.

La Joya Early College has established a Memorandum of Understanding (MOU) with South Texas College. This partnership offers dual enrollment courses, enabling students to attain an associate degree in interdisciplinary studies.
