= Juarez-Lincoln High School =

Location
- 7801 W. Mile 7 Line; Mission, Texas 78574; 26.32687°N 98.39867°W

Information
- School type: Public, High School
- Motto: Educational Excellence: The Right of Every Student
- Founded: 2008
- School district: La Joya ISD
- Principal: Jose Peña
- Staff: 147.59 (FTE)
- Grades: 9–12
- Enrollment: 1,974 (2023-2024)
- Student to teacher ratio: 13.37
- Language: English
- Campus: Suburban
- Colors: Red and Silver
- Mascot: Huskies
- Feeder schools: Ann Richards Middle School; Domingo Trevino Middle School; Juan De Dios Salinas Middle School
- Rival schools: La Joya High School; Palmview High School
- Website: jlhs.lajoyaisd.com

La Joya Juarez-Lincoln High School (JLHS) is a public senior high school in the Citrus City census-designated place in unincorporated Hidalgo County, Texas (with a Mission postal address), and a part of the La Joya Independent School District. Juarez-Lincoln, a Texas UIL Class 5A high school, is named after two presidents: Benito Juarez of Mexico, and Abraham Lincoln, 16th President of the United States. The school is home to students that live on the central and north side of La Joya ISD. It is known as Zone 2 in LJISD's maps.

Juarez-Lincoln serves Citrus City, sections of Alton and sections of La Homa CDP.

== District History ==
La Joya ISD had been home to a single high school entity since the district (then known as Tabasco ISD) erected Nellie Schunior Memorial High School in 1926, six years after the death of Nellie Leo Schunior, the first education pioneer in the district's current boundaries.

La Joya High School was later created, in order to house the growing number of students that Nellie Schunior Memorial High School could not accommodate. As the years rapidly passed, the communities within the district boundaries began to flourish, and the district population exploded. La Joya High School, being the sole high school within the 226 square miles (590 km^{2}) of land, grew to enormous proportions. For many decades, La Joya High School housed 9-12 grades. Eventually, the student population grew too much and a separate Ninth Grade Campus was built adjacent to La Joya High School. This campus proved to be too small for the 1500 freshman class by the year 2000, so a larger and brand new Ninth Grade Campus was built behind the existing campus, opening its doors to students in October 2000.

As the Freshman Class of 2000 was housed at the brand new Ninth Grade Campus, the remodeling project to expand the old Ninth Grade Campus went underway. By the year 2002, La Joya ISD was home to three high schools, but still only had one senior class, as all three campuses (conveniently located next to each other in a triangle) shared students. La Joya High School became known as La Joya Senior High School (housing only 11th and 12th graders), the newer Ninth Grade Campus changed its name to Juarez-Lincoln High School (housing half of the 9th and 10th grade students), and the newly remodeled old Ninth Grade Campus became Jimmy Carter High School (housing the other half of the 9th and 10th grade students).

Once again, population spurts in western Hidalgo County contributed to overcrowding at all three high schools. La Joya ISD had no choice but to split the district into three completely separate high schools, and for the first time ever, have multiple senior classes, multiple sports teams, and multiple mascots. The 2008-2009 school year became the inaugural year for both the Juarez-Lincoln Huskies and the Palmview Lobos. With a much smaller student population, Juarez-Lincoln High School was classified as a 4A school, but Palmview High School, with a student population parallel with La Joya High School, was classified as a 5A school.

== Juarez-Lincoln High School history ==
Juarez-Lincoln High School opened its permanent campus doors to its student population in January 2011. The school had been housed at the old campus from August 2008 through December 2010.

The school was reclassified in the 2012 UIL realignment as a 5A high school, and joined its sister schools (La Joya High School and Palmview High School) in the UIL rosters for athletic and fine art contests. Later, in 2014, UIL renamed all classifications in the state, and all three LJISD schools became Class 6A schools, which are schools with student enrollments of 2100+.

== Athletics ==
The Juarez-Lincoln Huskies are members of the District 15-Division 5A classification of the University Interscholastic League for all athletic, academic, and music competitions. The school offers athletic programs in:

- Baseball
- Basketball
- Cross Country
- Football
- Golf
- Powerlifting
- Soccer
- Softball
- Special Olympics
- Swimming and Diving
- Track and Field
- Volleyball
- Wrestling
- E-Sports(CTG)

== Fine Arts ==
The Juarez-Lincoln High School Fine Arts Department is a very large department, with a large percentage of the student body participating in at least one of these departments.

== New Traditions ==
=== Alma mater ===
Juarez-Lincoln High School's school song, "Alma Mater", uses the music of La Joya High School's original Alma Mater. The words to the song were written by Miss Anna Loya with the input of the First Graduating class and Student Council Officers of 2009.

=== Fight Song ===
Juarez-Lincoln High School's fight song uses Texas A&M's "Aggie War Hymn".
