= Sullivan City, Texas =

- City
- City of Sullivan City
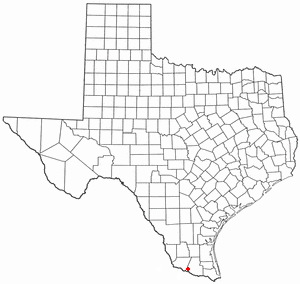
- Location of Sullivan City, Texas

- Coordinates: 26°16′30″N 98°34′6″W
- Country: United States of America
- State: Texas
- County: Hidalgo

Area
  - Total: 3.59 sq mi (9.30 km^{2})
  - Land: 3.59 sq mi (9.30 km^{2})
  - Water: 0 sq mi (0.00 km^{2})
- Elevation: 200 ft (61 m)

Population (2020)
  - Total: 3,908
  - Density: 1,161.7/sq mi (448.55/km^{2})
- Time zone: UTC-6 (Central (CST))
  - Summer (DST): UTC-5 (CDT)
- ZIP code: 78595
- Area code: 956
- FIPS code: 48-70868
- GNIS feature ID: 1348049
- Website: www.sullivancity.org

Sullivan City is a city in Hidalgo County, Texas, United States. The population was 3,908 at the 2020 United States Census. It is part of the McAllen–Edinburg–Mission and Reynosa–McAllen metropolitan areas.

== History ==
Sullivan City was named for Captain Ed Sullivan, a World War veteran, who owned a ranch. The town was formally opened in 1908. In 1911, the town was incorporated, with Sam Hargrove as mayor. William Jennings Bryan purchased land in the area in 1910, and he established a store and filling station.

== Geography ==
Sullivan City is located at 26°16′30″N 98°34′6″W (26.275087, –98.568330).

According to the United States Census Bureau, the city has a total area of 3.6 square miles (9.3 km^{2}), all land.

== Demographics ==
Historical population
Census	Pop.	Note	%±
1990	2,371		—
2000	3,998		68.6%
2010	4,002		0.1%
2020	3,908		−2.3%
U.S. Decennial Census; 1850–1900 1910; 1920 1930 1940; 1950 1960 1970; 1980 1990 2000; 2010 2020

Sullivan City first appeared as a census designated place in the 1990 U.S. census; and after incorporation, as a city in the 2000 U.S. census;

=== Racial and ethnic composition ===
Sullivan City city, Texas – Racial and ethnic composition Note: the US Census treats Hispanic/Latino as an ethnic category. This table excludes Latinos from the racial categories and assigns them to a separate category. Hispanics/Latinos may be of any race.
Race / Ethnicity (NH = Non-Hispanic)	Pop 2000	Pop 2010	Pop 2020	% 2000	% 2010	% 2020
White alone (NH)	53	15	45	1.33%	0.37%	1.15%
Black or African American alone (NH)	0	0	2	0.00%	0.00%	0.05%
Native American or Alaska Native alone (NH)	1	1	14	0.03%	0.02%	0.36%
Asian alone (NH)	0	0	0	0.00%	0.00%	0.00%
Native Hawaiian or Pacific Islander alone (NH)	0	0	0	0.00%	0.00%	0.00%
Other race alone (NH)	0	0	11	0.00%	0.00%	0.28%
Mixed race or Multiracial (NH)	0	0	0	0.00%	0.00%	0.00%
Hispanic or Latino (any race)	3,944	3,986	3,836	98.65%	99.60%	98.16%
Total	3,998	4,002	3,908	100.00%	100.00%	100.00%

=== 2020 census ===
As of the 2020 census, Sullivan City had a population of 3,908. The median age was 31.9 years, 30.1% of residents were under the age of 18, and 13.3% of residents were 65 years of age or older. For every 100 females there were 91.0 males, and for every 100 females age 18 and over there were 87.8 males age 18 and over.

0.0% of residents lived in urban areas, while 100.0% lived in rural areas.

There were 1,143 households in Sullivan City, of which 48.0% had children under the age of 18 living in them. Of all households, 57.1% were married-couple households, 11.2% were households with a male householder and no spouse or partner present, and 27.6% were households with a female householder and no spouse or partner present. About 13.2% of all households were made up of individuals and 6.2% had someone living alone who was 65 years of age or older.

There were 1,264 housing units, of which 9.6% were vacant. The homeowner vacancy rate was 1.8% and the rental vacancy rate was 8.7%.

Racial composition as of the 2020 census
Race	Number	Percent
White	1,259	32.2%
Black or African American	7	0.2%
American Indian and Alaska Native	39	1.0%
Asian	2	0.1%
Native Hawaiian and Other Pacific Islander	0	0.0%
Some other race	986	25.2%
Two or more races	1,615	41.3%
Hispanic or Latino (of any race)	3,836	98.2%

=== 2000 census ===
As of the census of 2000, there were 3,998 people, 981 households, and 909 families residing in the city. The population density was 1,117.1 inhabitants per square mile (431.3/km^{2}). There were 1,136 housing units at an average density of 317.4 per square mile (122.5/km^{2}). The racial makeup of the city was 64.96% White, 0.10% African American, 0.03% Native American, 34.09% from other races, and 0.83% from two or more races. Hispanic or Latino of any race were 98.65% of the population.

There were 981 households, out of which 60.2% had children under the age of 18 living with them, 74.0% were married couples living together, 14.5% had a female householder with no husband present, and 7.3% were non-families. 6.6% of all households were made up of individuals, and 3.4% had someone living alone who was 65 years of age or older. The average household size was 4.08 and the average family size was 4.29.

In the city, the population was spread out, with 38.5% under the age of 18, 12.9% from 18 to 24, 27.4% from 25 to 44, 16.1% from 45 to 64, and 5.1% who were 65 years of age or older. The median age was 24 years. For every 100 females, there were 96.2 males. For every 100 females age 18 and over, there were 94.5 males.

The median income for a household in the city was $17,743, and the median income for a family was $18,056. Males had a median income of $16,628 versus $12,670 for females. The per capita income for the city was $5,131. About 49.0% of families and 47.8% of the population were below the poverty line, including 52.2% of those under age 18 and 60.5% of those age 65 or over.

== Education ==
Sullivan City is served by the La Joya Independent School District. Elementary schools that serve the city are Rosendo Benavides Elementary and Sam Fordyce Elementary School. The secondary schools serving the city are Lorenzo de Zavala Middle School, and La Joya High School.

In addition, South Texas Independent School District operates magnet schools that serve the community.

Areas to the west of Sullivan City are served by the Rio Grande City Consolidated Independent School District.

== Government and infrastructure ==
The United States Postal Service operates the Sullivan City Post Office.
