= Palmview South, Texas =

- Census-designated place
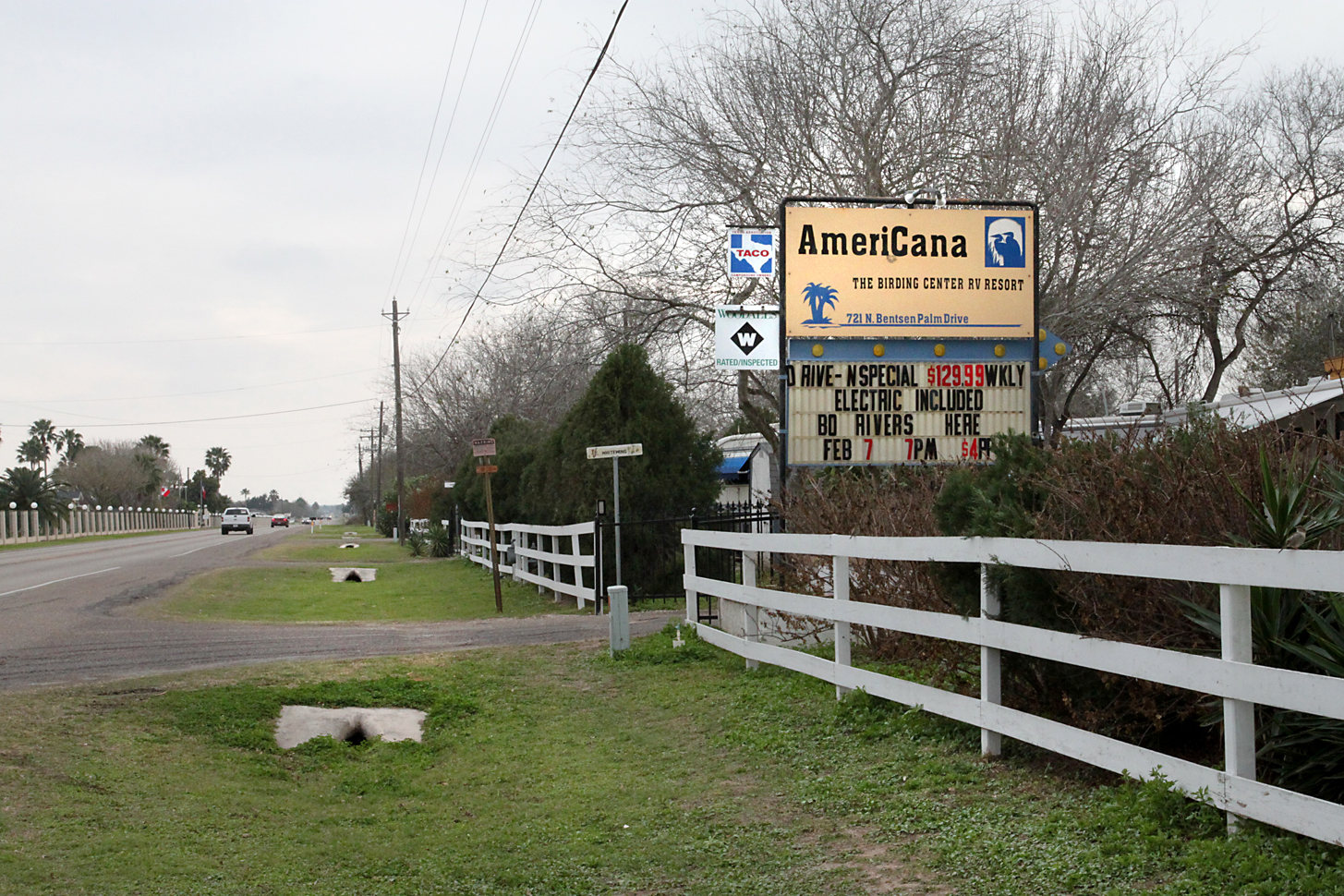
- RV park in Palmview South, Texas

- Coordinates: 26°13′11″N 98°22′29″W
- Country: United States of America
- State: Texas
- County: Hidalgo

Area
  - Total: 3.1 sq mi (7.9 km^{2})
  - Land: 3.0 sq mi (7.8 km^{2})
  - Water: 0.039 sq mi (0.1 km^{2})
- Elevation: 135 ft (41 m)

Population (2020)
  - Total: 2,008
  - Density: 670/sq mi (260/km^{2})
- Time zone: UTC-6 (Central (CST))
  - Summer (DST): UTC-5 (CDT)
- ZIP code: 78572
- Area code: 956
- FIPS code: 48-54810
- GNIS feature ID: 1852749

Palmview South is a census-designated place (CDP) in Hidalgo County, Texas, United States. The population was 2,008 at the 2020 United States Census. It is part of the McAllen–Edinburg–Mission Metropolitan Statistical Area.

== Geography ==
Palmview South is located at 26°13′11″N 98°22′29″W (26.219769, -98.374852).

According to the United States Census Bureau, the CDP has a total area of 3.0 square miles (7.9 km^{2}), of which 3.0 square miles (7.8 km^{2}) is land and 0.04 square mile (0.1 km^{2}) (0.99%) is water.

== Demographics ==
Historical population
Census	Pop.	Note	%±
2000	6,219		—
2010	5,575		−10.4%
2020	2,008		−64.0%
U.S. Decennial Census; 1850–1900 1910; 1920 1930 1940; 1950 1960 1970; 1980 1990 2000; 2010 2020

Palmview South first appeared as a census designated place in the 2000 U.S. census.

=== 2020 census ===
Palmview South CDP, Texas – Racial and ethnic composition Note: the US Census treats Hispanic/Latino as an ethnic category. This table excludes Latinos from the racial categories and assigns them to a separate category. Hispanics/Latinos may be of any race.
Race / Ethnicity (NH = Non-Hispanic)	Pop 2000	Pop 2010	Pop 2020	% 2000	% 2010	% 2020
White alone (NH)	900	878	114	14.47%	15.75%	5.68%
Black or African American alone (NH)	3	1	0	0.05%	0.02%	0.00%
Native American or Alaska Native alone (NH)	0	2	0	0.00%	0.04%	0.00%
Asian alone (NH)	5	4	2	0.08%	0.07%	0.10%
Pacific Islander alone (NH)	1	0	0	0.02%	0.00%	0.00%
Other race alone (NH)	0	1	4	0.00%	0.02%	0.20%
Mixed race or Multiracial (NH)	13	8	7	0.21%	0.14%	0.35%
Hispanic or Latino (any race)	5,297	4,681	1,881	85.17%	83.96%	93.68%
Total	6,219	5,575	2,008	100.00%	100.00%	100.00%

As of the census of 2000, there were 6,219 people, 1,714 households, and 1,523 families residing in the CDP. The population density was 2,066.7 inhabitants per square mile (798.0/km^{2}). There were 2,950 housing units at an average density of 980.4 per square mile (378.5/km^{2}). The racial makeup of the CDP was 78.71% White, 0.19% African American, 0.05% Native American, 0.08% Asian, 0.02% Pacific Islander, 19.81% from other races, and 1.14% from two or more races. Hispanic or Latino of any race were 85.17% of the population.

There were 1,714 households, out of which 49.1% had children under the age of 18 living with them, 76.3% were married couples living together, 9.7% had a female householder with no husband present, and 11.1% were non-families. 9.6% of all households were made up of individuals, and 6.2% had someone living alone who was 65 years of age or older. The average household size was 3.63 and the average family size was 3.89.

In the CDP, the population was spread out, with 35.7% under the age of 18, 10.1% from 18 to 24, 25.6% from 25 to 44, 14.4% from 45 to 64, and 14.3% who were 65 years of age or older. The median age was 28 years. For every 100 females, there were 96.7 males. For every 100 females age 18 and over, there were 92.1 males.

The median income for a household in the CDP was $21,649, and the median income for a family was $22,292. Males had a median income of $15,387 versus $11,538 for females. The per capita income for the CDP was $7,912. About 31.6% of families and 38.3% of the population were below the poverty line, including 51.8% of those under age 18 and 16.1% of those age 65 or over.

== Education ==
Palmview South is served by the La Joya Independent School District. Zoned schools include:

- Elementary: Enrique Camarena, Jose de Escandon, Guillermo Flores, and Leo J. Leo.
- Middle: C. Chavez and Irene Garcia
- Palmview High School and La Joya High School

In addition, South Texas Independent School District operates magnet schools that serve the community.
