= South Alamo, Texas =

- Census-designated place
- Nickname: "Little Mex"
- Coordinates: 26°9′3″N 98°6′43″W
- Country: United States of America
- State: Texas
- County: Hidalgo

Area
  - Total: 2.0 sq mi (5.2 km^{2})
  - Land: 2.0 sq mi (5.2 km^{2})
  - Water: 0 sq mi (0.0 km^{2})
- Elevation: 95 ft (29 m)

Population (2020)
  - Total: 3,414
  - Density: 1,700/sq mi (660/km^{2})
- Time zone: UTC-6 (Central (CST))
  - Summer (DST): UTC-5 (CDT)
- ZIP code: 78516
- FIPS code: 48-68846
- GNIS feature ID: 1852768

South Alamo is a census-designated place (CDP) in Hidalgo County, Texas, United States. The area is known locally as "Little Mex (Mexico)". The population was 3,414 at the 2020 United States Census. It is part of the McAllen–Edinburg–Mission Metropolitan Statistical Area.

== Geography ==
South Alamo is located at 26°9′3″N 98°6′43″W (26.150741, -98.111956).

According to the United States Census Bureau, the CDP has a total area of 2.0 square miles (5.2 km^{2}), all land.

== Demographics ==
Historical population
Census	Pop.	Note	%±
2000	3,101		—
2010	3,361		8.4%
2020	3,414		1.6%
U.S. Decennial Census; 1850–1900 1910; 1920 1930 1940; 1950 1960 1970; 1980 1990 2000; 2010 2020

South Alamo first appeared as a census designated place in the 2000 U.S. census.

=== Racial and ethnic composition ===
South Alamo CDP, Texas – Racial and ethnic composition Note: the US Census treats Hispanic/Latino as an ethnic category. This table excludes Latinos from the racial categories and assigns them to a separate category. Hispanics/Latinos may be of any race.
Race / Ethnicity (NH = Non-Hispanic)	Pop 2000	Pop 2010	Pop 2020	% 2000	% 2010	% 2020
White alone (NH)	47	32	38	1.52%	0.95%	1.11%
Black or African American alone (NH)	0	0	3	0.00%	0.00%	0.09%
Native American or Alaska Native alone (NH)	0	0	0	0.00%	0.00%	0.00%
Asian alone (NH)	1	1	8	0.03%	0.03%	0.23%
Native Hawaiian or Pacific Islander alone (NH)	0	0	1	0.00%	0.00%	0.03%
Other race alone (NH)	1	0	8	0.03%	0.00%	0.23%
Mixed race or Multiracial (NH)	1	0	11	0.03%	0.00%	0.32%
Hispanic or Latino (any race)	3,051	3,328	3,345	98.39%	99.02%	97.98%
Total	3,101	3,361	3,414	100.00%	100.00%	100.00%

=== 2020 census ===
As of the 2020 census, South Alamo had a population of 3,414. The median age was 28.2 years. 32.8% of residents were under the age of 18 and 9.0% of residents were 65 years of age or older. For every 100 females there were 100.0 males, and for every 100 females age 18 and over there were 95.1 males age 18 and over.

86.6% of residents lived in urban areas, while 13.4% lived in rural areas.

There were 801 households in South Alamo, of which 55.1% had children under the age of 18 living in them. Of all households, 54.7% were married-couple households, 14.7% were households with a male householder and no spouse or partner present, and 26.0% were households with a female householder and no spouse or partner present. About 10.1% of all households were made up of individuals and 4.9% had someone living alone who was 65 years of age or older.

There were 864 housing units, of which 7.3% were vacant. The homeowner vacancy rate was 0.8% and the rental vacancy rate was 5.8%.

=== 2000 census ===
As of the census of 2000, there were 3,101 people, 649 households, and 608 families residing in the CDP. The population density was 1,536.2 inhabitants per square mile (593.1/km^{2}). There were 703 housing units at an average density of 348.3 per square mile (134.5/km^{2}). The racial makeup of the CDP was 97.07% White, 0.19% African American, 0.29% Asian, 1.68% from other races, and 0.77% from two or more races. Hispanic or Latino of any race were 98.39% of the population.

There were 649 households, out of which 70.6% had children under the age of 18 living with them, 76.6% were married couples living together, 12.3% had a female householder with no husband present, and 6.2% were non-families. 4.8% of all households were made up of individuals, and 1.8% had someone living alone who was 65 years of age or older. The average household size was 4.78 and the average family size was 4.92.

In the CDP, the population was spread out, with 45.6% under the age of 18, 11.6% from 18 to 24, 28.5% from 25 to 44, 10.9% from 45 to 64, and 3.3% who were 65 years of age or older. The median age was 20 years. For every 100 females, there were 104.1 males. For every 100 females age 18 and over, there were 103.9 males.

The median income for a household in the CDP was $13,906, and the median income for a family was $14,598. Males had a median income of $14,944 versus $11,094 for females. The per capita income for the CDP was $3,162. About 66.2% of families and 69.2% of the population were below the poverty line, including 76.7% of those under age 18 and 75.9% of those age 65 or over. It is the poorest place in the United States with a population of over 1,000, and the 15th poorest overall.

== Education ==
South Alamo is in the Donna Independent School District.

In addition, South Texas Independent School District operates magnet schools that serve the community.
