= La Homa, Texas =

- Census-designated place
- Coordinates: 26°16′34″N 98°21′32″W
- Country: United States of America
- State: Texas
- County: Hidalgo

Area
  - Total: 6.9 sq mi (17.8 km^{2})
  - Land: 6.9 sq mi (17.8 km^{2})
  - Water: 0 sq mi (0.0 km^{2})
- Elevation: 160 ft (50 m)

Population (2020)
  - Total: 11,267
  - Density: 1,640/sq mi (633/km^{2})
- Time zone: UTC-6 (Central (CST))
  - Summer (DST): UTC-5 (CDT)
- ZIP code: 78574
- Area code: 956
- FIPS code: 48-40342
- GNIS feature ID: 1867552

La Homa is a census-designated place (CDP) in Hidalgo County, Texas, United States. The population was 11,267 at the 2020 United States Census. It is part of the McAllen–Edinburg–Mission Metropolitan Statistical Area.

== Geography ==
La Homa is located at 26°16′34″N 98°21′32″W (26.275973, -98.358892).

According to the United States Census Bureau, the CDP has a total area of 6.9 square miles (18 km^{2}), all land.

== Demographics ==
Historical population
Census	Pop.	Note	%±
1990	1,403		—
2000	10,433		643.6%
2010	11,985		14.9%
2020	11,267		−6.0%
U.S. Decennial Census; 1850–1900 1910; 1920 1930 1940; 1950 1960 1970; 1980 1990 2000; 2010 2020

La Homa first appeared as a census designated place in the 1990 U.S. census.

=== Racial and ethnic composition ===
La Homa CDP, Texas – Racial and ethnic composition Note: the US Census treats Hispanic/Latino as an ethnic category. This table excludes Latinos from the racial categories and assigns them to a separate category. Hispanics/Latinos may be of any race.
Race / Ethnicity (NH = Non-Hispanic)	Pop 2000	Pop 2010	Pop 2020	% 2000	% 2010	% 2020
White alone (NH)	222	343	331	2.13%	2.86%	2.94%
Black or African American alone (NH)	4	2	1	0.04%	0.02%	0.01%
Native American or Alaska Native alone (NH)	1	3	3	0.01%	0.03%	0.03%
Asian alone (NH)	7	4	10	0.07%	0.03%	0.09%
Native Hawaiian or Pacific Islander alone (NH)	0	0	0	0.00%	0.00%	0.00%
Other race alone (NH)	1	0	18	0.01%	0.00%	0.16%
Mixed race or Multiracial (NH)	2	1	20	0.02%	0.01%	0.18%
Hispanic or Latino (any race)	10,196	11,632	10,884	97.73%	97.05%	96.60%
Total	10,433	11,985	11,267	100.00%	100.00%	100.00%

=== 2020 census ===
As of the 2020 census, La Homa had a population of 11,267. The median age was 28.6 years. 31.9% of residents were under the age of 18 and 9.6% of residents were 65 years of age or older. For every 100 females there were 94.1 males, and for every 100 females age 18 and over there were 90.0 males age 18 and over.

100.0% of residents lived in urban areas, while 0.0% lived in rural areas.

There were 2,880 households in La Homa, of which 52.4% had children under the age of 18 living in them. Of all households, 55.0% were married-couple households, 13.2% were households with a male householder and no spouse or partner present, and 27.1% were households with a female householder and no spouse or partner present. About 12.6% of all households were made up of individuals and 4.9% had someone living alone who was 65 years of age or older.

There were 3,362 housing units, of which 14.3% were vacant. The homeowner vacancy rate was 0.6% and the rental vacancy rate was 13.6%.

=== 2010 census ===
As of the 2010 census, there were 11,985 people, 2,381 households, and 2,211 families residing in the CDP. The population density was 1,521.6 inhabitants per square mile (587.5/km^{2}). There were 2,856 housing units at an average density of 416.5 per square mile (160.8/km^{2}). The racial makeup of the CDP was 87.89% White, 0.12% African American, 0.02% Native American, 0.07% Asian, 11.46% from other races, and 0.44% from two or more races. Hispanic or Latino of any race were 97.73% of the population.

There were 2,381 households, out of which 67.0% had children under the age of 18 living with them, 75.7% were married couples living together, 13.3% had a female householder with no husband present, and 7.1% were non-families. 6.0% of all households were made up of individuals, and 2.3% had someone living alone who was 65 years of age or older. The average household size was 4.37 and the average family size was 4.52.

In the CDP, the population was spread out, with 43.2% under the age of 18, 11.9% from 18 to 24, 29.0% from 25 to 44, 11.7% from 45 to 64, and 4.2% who were 65 years of age or older. The median age was 22 years. For every 100 females, there were 99.6 males. For every 100 females age 18 and over, there were 95.3 males.

The median income for a household in the CDP was $16,887, and the median income for a family was $17,707. Males had a median income of $15,295 versus $13,897 for females. The per capita income for the CDP was $5,180. About 53.8% of families and 57.4% of the population were below the poverty line, including 63.9% of those under age 18 and 62.2% of those age 65 or over.

== Education ==
La Homa is served by the La Joya Independent School District.

Zoned schools include:

- Elementary: Lloyd Bentsen, Kika de la Garza, Henry B. González, Américo Paredes, Patricio Pérez, and E. B. Reyna
- Middle: I. Garcia, Memorial, J. D. Salinas, and Domingo Treviño
- Juarez-Lincoln High School and Palmview High School

In addition, South Texas Independent School District operates magnet schools that serve the community.
