= Cuevitas, Texas =

- Census-designated place
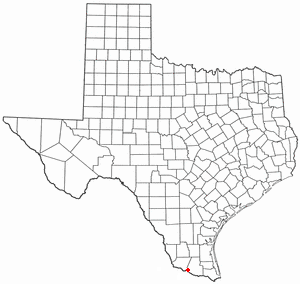
- Location of Cuevitas, Texas

- Coordinates: 26°15′46″N 98°34′44″W
- Country: United States of America
- State: Texas
- County: Hidalgo

Area
  - Total: 0.31 sq mi (0.8 km^{2})
  - Land: 0.27 sq mi (0.7 km^{2})
  - Water: 0.039 sq mi (0.1 km^{2})
- Elevation: 141 ft (43 m)

Population (2020)
  - Total: 33
  - Density: 120/sq mi (47/km^{2})
- Time zone: UTC-6 (Central (CST))
  - Summer (DST): UTC-5 (CDT)
- FIPS code: 48-18104
- GNIS feature ID: 1333792

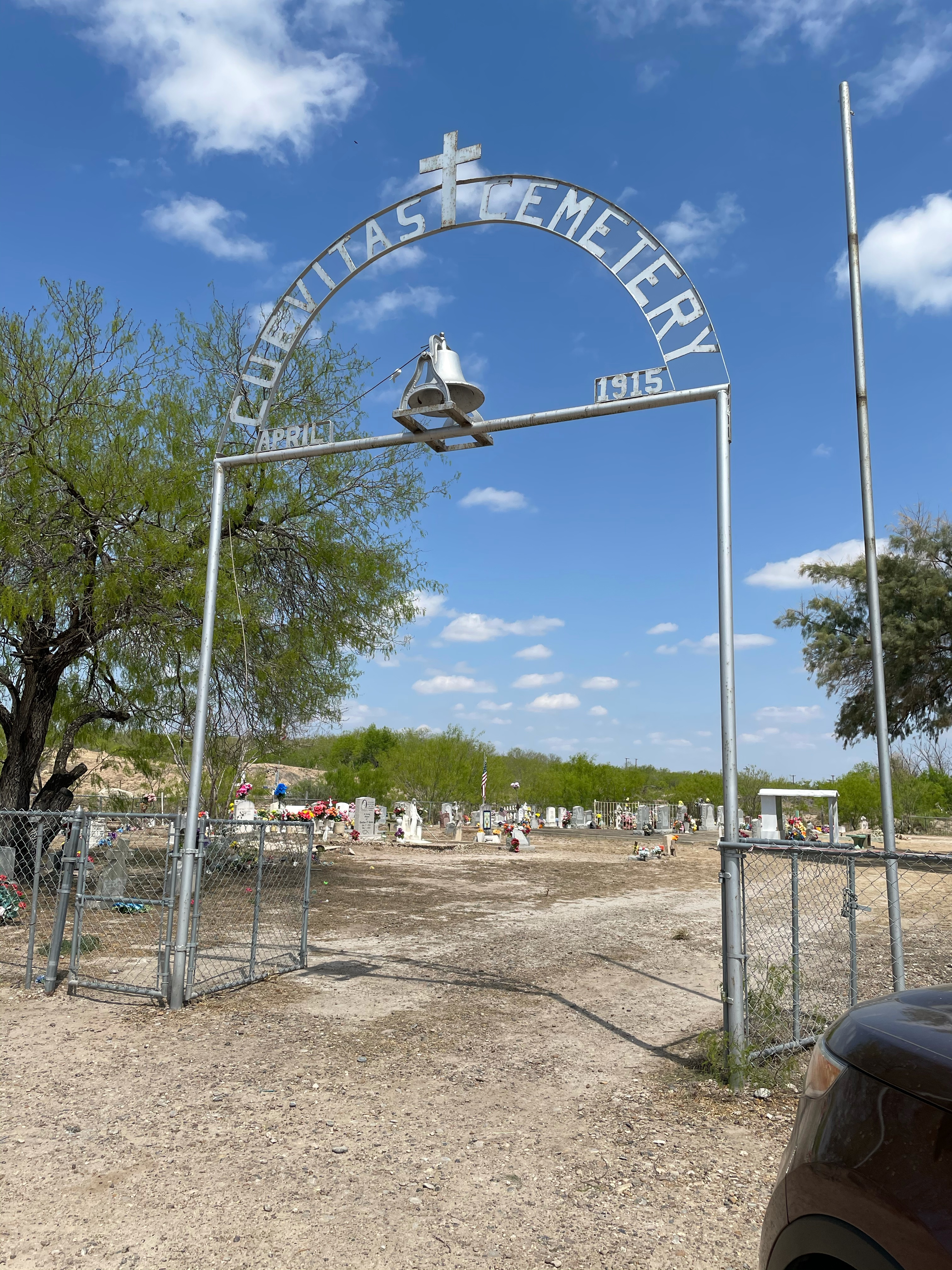
Photo taken March 21, 2021

Cuevitas is a census-designated place (CDP) in Hidalgo County, Texas, United States. As of the 2020 census, Cuevitas had a population of 33. Rated the poorest community in Texas, it is part of the McAllen–Edinburg–Mission Metropolitan Statistical Area.

== Geography ==
Cuevitas is located at 26°15′46″N 98°34′44″W (26.262686, -98.578912).

According to the United States Census Bureau, the CDP has a total area of 0.3 square miles (0.78 km^{2}), of which 0.3 square miles (0.78 km^{2}) is land and 0.04 square miles (0.10 km^{2}) (10.00%) is water.

== Demographics ==
Historical population
Census	Pop.	Note	%±
2000	37		—
2010	40		8.1%
2020	33		−17.5%
U.S. Decennial Census; 1850–1900 1910; 1920 1930 1940; 1950 1960 1970; 1980 1990 2000; 2010 2020

Cuevitas first appeared as a census designated place in the 2000 U.S. census.

=== 2020 census ===
Cuevitas CDP, Texas – Racial and ethnic composition Note: the US Census treats Hispanic/Latino as an ethnic category. This table excludes Latinos from the racial categories and assigns them to a separate category. Hispanics/Latinos may be of any race.
Race / Ethnicity (NH = Non-Hispanic)	Pop 2000	Pop 2010	Pop 2020	% 2000	% 2010	% 2020
White alone (NH)	0	0	0	0.00%	0.00%	0%
Black or African American alone (NH)	0	0	0	0.00%	0.00%	0.00%
Native American or Alaska Native alone (NH)	0	0	0	0.00%	0.00%	0.00%
Asian alone (NH)	0	0	0	0.00%	0.00%	0.00%
Native Hawaiian or Pacific Islander alone (NH)	0	0	0	0.00%	0.00%	0.00%
Other race alone (NH)	0	0	0	0.00%	0.00%	0.00%
Mixed race or Multiracial (NH)	0	0	2	0.00%	0.00%	6.06%
Hispanic or Latino (any race)	37	40	31	100.00%	100.00%	93.94%
Total	37	40	33	100.00%	100.00%	100.00%

As of the census of 2000, there were 37 people, 12 households, and 9 families residing in the CDP. The population density was 136.3 inhabitants per square mile (52.6/km^{2}). There were 16 housing units at an average density of 58.9 per square mile (22.7/km^{2}). The racial makeup of the CDP was 100.00% Hispanic.

There were 12 households, out of which 25.0% had children under the age of 18 living with them, 58.3% were married couples living together, 16.7% had a female householder with no husband present, and 16.7% were non-families. 16.7% of all households were made up of individuals, and 8.3% had someone living alone who was 65 years of age or older. The average household size was 3.08 and the average family size was 3.50.

In the CDP, the population was spread out, with 24.3% under the age of 18, 13.5% from 18 to 24, 24.3% from 25 to 44, 18.9% from 45 to 64, and 18.9% who were 65 years of age or older. The median age was 38 years. For every 100 females, there were 68.2 males. For every 100 females age 18 and over, there were 86.7 males.

The median income for a household in the CDP was $8,750, and the median income for a family was $8,750. Males had a median income of $0 versus $0 for females. The per capita income for the CDP was $1,703, which is the lowest in the state of Texas. There were 100.0% of families and 100.0% of the population living below the poverty line, including 100.0% of under 18s and none of those over 64.

== Education ==
Cuevitas is within the boundary of La Joya Independent School District. The zoned schools for residents are Sam Fordyce Elementary School, Lorenzo de Zavala Middle School, and La Joya High School.

In addition, South Texas Independent School District operates magnet schools that serve the community.

== Popular Culture ==
Cuevitas is mentioned in the episode "Greater Love" of the television western Gunsmoke.
