= Doffing, Texas =

- Census-designated place
- Coordinates: 26°16′23″N 98°23′5″W
- Country: United States of America
- State: Texas
- County: Hidalgo

Area
  - Total: 4.3 sq mi (11.2 km^{2})
  - Land: 4.3 sq mi (11.2 km^{2})
  - Water: 0 sq mi (0.0 km^{2})
- Elevation: 194 ft (59 m)

Population (2020)
  - Total: 5,618
  - Density: 1,300/sq mi (502/km^{2})
- Time zone: UTC-6 (Central (CST))
  - Summer (DST): UTC-5 (CDT)
- ZIP code: 78574
- FIPS code: 48-20734
- GNIS feature ID: 1852698

Doffing is a census-designated place (CDP) in Hidalgo County, Texas, United States. As of the 2020 census, Doffing had a population of 5,618. It is part of the McAllen–Edinburg–Mission Metropolitan Statistical Area.

== Geography ==
Doffing is located at 26°16′23″N 98°23′5″W (26.273076, -98.384741).

According to the United States Census Bureau, the CDP has a total area of 4.3 square miles (11 km^{2}), all land.

== Demographics ==
Historical population
Census	Pop.	Note	%±
2000	4,256		—
2010	5,091		19.6%
2020	5,618		10.4%
U.S. Decennial Census; 1850–1900 1910; 1920 1930 1940; 1950 1960 1970; 1980 1990 2000; 2010 2020

Doffing first appeared as a census designated place in the 2000 U.S. census.

=== 2020 census ===
Doffing CDP, Texas – Racial and ethnic composition Note: the US Census treats Hispanic/Latino as an ethnic category. This table excludes Latinos from the racial categories and assigns them to a separate category. Hispanics/Latinos may be of any race.
Race / Ethnicity (NH = Non-Hispanic)	Pop 2000	Pop 2010	Pop 2020	% 2000	% 2010	% 2020
White alone (NH)	34	172	49	0.80%	3.38%	0.87%
Black or African American alone (NH)	0	3	5	0.00%	0.06%	0.09%
Native American or Alaska Native alone (NH)	0	7	0	0.00%	0.14%	0.00%
Asian alone (NH)	0	1	0	0.00%	0.02%	0.00%
Native Hawaiian or Pacific Islander alone (NH)	0	0	0	0.00%	0.00%	0.00%
Other race alone (NH)	0	0	12	0.00%	0.00%	0.21%
Mixed race or Multiracial (NH)	0	1	9	0.00%	0.02%	0.16%
Hispanic or Latino (any race)	4,222	4,907	5,543	99.20%	96.39%	98.67%
Total	4,256	5,091	5,618	100.00%	100.00%	100.00%

As of the census of 2000, there were 4,256 people, 915 households, and 871 families residing in the CDP. The population density was 982.0 inhabitants per square mile (379.2/km^{2}). There were 1,024 housing units at an average density of 236.3 per square mile (91.2/km^{2}). The racial makeup of the CDP was 34.35% White, 0.02% African American, 64.92% from other races, and 0.70% from two or more races. Hispanic or Latino of any race were 99.20% of the population.

There were 915 households, out of which 75.7% had children under the age of 18 living with them, 79.9% were married couples living together, 11.8% had a female householder with no husband present, and 4.8% were non-families. 4.3% of all households were made up of individuals, and 1.3% had someone living alone who was 65 years of age or older. The average household size was 4.65 and the average family size was 4.74.

In the CDP, the population was spread out, with 45.7% under the age of 18, 10.7% from 18 to 24, 30.4% from 25 to 44, 10.9% from 45 to 64, and 2.4% who were 65 years of age or older. The median age was 20 years. For every 100 females, there were 96.9 males. For every 100 females age 18 and over, there were 95.2 males.

The median income for a household in the CDP was $18,192, and the median income for a family was $19,353. Males had a median income of $15,017 versus $12,784 for females. The per capita income for the CDP was $4,923. About 43.0% of families and 42.5% of the population were below the poverty line, including 48.5% of those under age 18 and 26.8% of those age 65 or over.

== Education ==
Doffing is served by the La Joya Independent School District. Zoned schools include:

- Elementary: Narciso Cavazos, E. R. Chapa, Henry B. González, and Patricio Perez
- Middle: Irene Garcia, A. Richards, and J. D. Salinas
- La Joya High School and Palmview High School

In addition, South Texas Independent School District operates magnet schools that serve the community.
