= Citrus City, Texas =

- Census-designated place
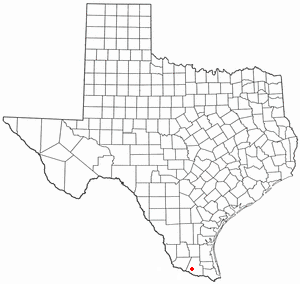
- Location of Citrus City, Texas

- Coordinates: 26°19′38″N 98°23′28″W
- Country: United States of America
- State: Texas
- County: Hidalgo

Area
  - Total: 2.0 sq mi (5.3 km^{2})
  - Land: 2.0 sq mi (5.3 km^{2})
  - Water: 0 sq mi (0.0 km^{2})
- Elevation: 217 ft (66 m)

Population (2020)
  - Total: 3,291
  - Density: 1,600/sq mi (620/km^{2})
- Time zone: UTC-6 (Central (CST))
  - Summer (DST): UTC-5 (CDT)
- ZIP code: 78572
- Area code: 956
- FIPS code: 48-15028
- GNIS feature ID: 1378124

Citrus City is a census-designated place (CDP) in Hidalgo County, Texas, United States. The population was 3,291 at the 2020 census. It is part of the McAllen–Edinburg–Mission Metropolitan Statistical Area. The town was founded in 1943 during World War II by Howard Moffitt, a builder known for his vernacular Moffitt cottage architectural style, as part of a planned regional orange and grapefruit growing community. The local irrigation system proved to be too saline for fruit production, and the plans for a large town were revised. A few Moffitt houses survive in Citrus City.

== Geography ==
Citrus City is located at 26°19′38″N 98°23′28″W (26.327092, -98.390987).

According to the United States Census Bureau, the CDP has a total area of 2.0 square miles (5.2 km^{2}), all land.

== Demographics ==
Historical population
Census	Pop.	Note	%±
2000	941		—
2010	2,321		146.7%
2020	3,291		41.8%
U.S. Decennial Census; 1850–1900 1910; 1920 1930 1940; 1950 1960 1970; 1980 1990 2000; 2010

Citrus City first appeared as a census designated place in the 2000 U.S. census.

=== Racial and ethnic composition ===
Citrus City CDP, Texas – Racial and ethnic composition Note: the US Census treats Hispanic/Latino as an ethnic category. This table excludes Latinos from the racial categories and assigns them to a separate category. Hispanics/Latinos may be of any race.
Race / Ethnicity (NH = Non-Hispanic)	Pop 2000	Pop 2010	Pop 2020	% 2000	% 2010	% 2020
White alone (NH)	12	292	56	1.28%	12.58%	1.70%
Black or African American alone (NH)	0	1	1	0.00%	0.04%	0.03%
Native American or Alaska Native alone (NH)	0	0	0	0.00%	0.00%	0.00%
Asian alone (NH)	0	0	1	0.00%	0.00%	0.03%
Native Hawaiian or Pacific Islander alone (NH)	0	0	0	0.00%	0.00%	0.00%
Other race alone (NH)	0	1	0	0.00%	0.04%	0.00%
Mixed race or Multiracial (NH)	0	1	9	0.00%	0.04%	0.27%
Hispanic or Latino (any race)	929	2,026	3,224	98.72%	87.29%	97.96%
Total	941	2,321	3,291	100.00%	100.00%	100.00%

=== 2020 census ===
As of the 2020 census, Citrus City had a population of 3,291. The median age was 22.9 years. 41.0% of residents were under the age of 18 and 5.0% of residents were 65 years of age or older. For every 100 females there were 89.8 males, and for every 100 females age 18 and over there were 85.6 males age 18 and over.

93.8% of residents lived in urban areas, while 6.2% lived in rural areas.

There were 728 households in Citrus City, of which 67.9% had children under the age of 18 living in them. Of all households, 55.9% were married-couple households, 11.8% were households with a male householder and no spouse or partner present, and 25.5% were households with a female householder and no spouse or partner present. About 6.7% of all households were made up of individuals and 2.3% had someone living alone who was 65 years of age or older.

There were 797 housing units, of which 8.7% were vacant. The homeowner vacancy rate was 0.0% and the rental vacancy rate was 3.4%.

=== 2000 census ===
As of the census of 2000, there were 941 people, 203 households, and 190 families residing in the CDP. The population density was 463.0 inhabitants per square mile (178.8/km^{2}). There were 222 housing units at an average density of 109.2 per square mile (42.2/km^{2}). The racial makeup of the CDP was 13.28% White, 0.21% African American, 85.76% from other races, and 0.74% from two or more races. Hispanic or Latino of any race were 98.72% of the population.

There were 203 households, out of which 67.5% had children under the age of 18 living with them, 74.4% were married couples living together, 15.3% had a female householder with no husband present, and 6.4% were non-families. 5.4% of all households were made up of individuals, and 2.0% had someone living alone who was 65 years of age or older. The average household size was 4.64 and the average family size was 4.68.

In the CDP, the population was spread out, with 43.1% under the age of 18, 13.8% from 18 to 24, 29.3% from 25 to 44, 11.1% from 45 to 64, and 2.7% who were 65 years of age or older. The median age was 21 years. For every 100 females, there were 94.4 males. For every 100 females age 18 and over, there were 89.7 males.

The median income for a household in the CDP was $15,278, and the median income for a family was $14,667. Males had a median income of $15,972 versus $14,886 for females. The per capita income for the CDP was $6,117. About 49.4% of families and 47.8% of the population were below the poverty line, including 45.2% of those under age 18 and 54.8% of those age 65 or over.

== Education ==
Citrus City is served by the La Joya Independent School District.

Zoned schools include:

- Sections are zoned to Juan M. Seguin Elementary School while others are zoned to Dr. Mendiola Elementary School
- Some are zoned to J. D. Salinas Middle School while others are zoned to A. Richards Middle School
- Juarez-Lincoln High School

In addition, South Texas Independent School District operates magnet schools that serve the community.
