= Peñitas, Texas =

- City
- Location of Peñitas, Texas
- Coordinates: 26.258315°N 98.438645°W
- Country: United States
- State: Texas
- County: Hidalgo
- Founded: mid-1520s

Government
  - Type: Council–manager
  - Mayor: Ramiro Loya
  - Mayor Pro-Tem: Osiel Ramos
  - City Council: Felipe Quintanilla

Area
  - Total: 9.407 sq mi (24.364 km^{2})
  - Land: 9.365 sq mi (24.255 km^{2})
  - Water: 0.042 sq mi (0.108 km^{2}) 0.45%
- Elevation: 144 ft (44 m)

Population (2020)
  - Total: 6,460
  - Estimate (2024): 6,568
  - Density: 701/sq mi (270.8/km^{2})
- Time zone: UTC–6 (Central (CST))
  - Summer (DST): UTC–5 (CDT)
- ZIP Code: 78576
- Area code: 956
- FIPS code: 48-56696
- GNIS feature ID: 1388195
- Website: cityofpenitas.com

Peñitas is a city in Hidalgo County, Texas, United States. The population was 6,460 at the 2020 census, and was estimated to be 6,568 in 2024.

It is part of the McAllen–Edinburg–Mission and Reynosa–McAllen metropolitan areas.

== History ==
Peñitas was founded in the mid-1520's.

== Geography ==
Peñitas is located in southwestern Hidalgo County at 26.258315°N 98.438645°W. It is bordered to the west by the city of La Joya. U.S. Route 83 runs through Peñitas, leading east 14 miles (23 km) to McAllen and west 26 miles (42 km) to Rio Grande City.

According to the United States Census Bureau, the city has a total area of 9.407 square miles (24.36 km^{2}), of which, 9.365 square miles (24.26 km^{2}) is land and 0.042 square miles (0.11 km^{2}) (0.45%) is water.

== Demographics ==
Historical population
Census	Pop.	Note	%±
1990	1,077		—
2000	1,167		8.4%
2010	4,403		277.3%
2020	6,460		46.7%
2024 (est.)	6,568		1.7%
U.S. Decennial Census; 2020 Census

Peñitas first appeared as a census designated place in the 1990 census.

According to realtor website Zillow, the average price of a home as of May 31, 2025, in Peñitas is $164,348.

As of the 2023 American Community Survey, there are 1,622 estimated households in Peñitas with an average of 3.92 persons per household. The city has a median household income of $52,857. Approximately 28.3% of the city's population lives at or below the poverty line. Peñitas has an estimated 55.3% employment rate, with 8.7% of the population holding a bachelor's degree or higher and 56.3% holding a high school diploma.

The top five reported ancestries (people were allowed to report up to two ancestries, thus the figures will generally add to more than 100%) were English (6.2%), Spanish (93.8%), Indo-European (0.0%), Asian and Pacific Islander (0.0%), and Other (0.0%).

The median age in the city was 30.2 years.

Peñitas, Texas – racial and ethnic composition Note: the US Census treats Hispanic/Latino as an ethnic category. This table excludes Latinos from the racial categories and assigns them to a separate category. Hispanics/Latinos may be of any race.
Race / ethnicity (NH = non-Hispanic)	Pop. 1990	Pop. 2000	Pop. 2010	Pop. 2020	% 1990	% 2000	% 2010	% 2020
White alone (NH)	26	20	75	109	2.41%	1.71%	1.70%	1.69%
Black or African American alone (NH)	0	1	0	6	0.00%	0.09%	0.00%	0.09%
Native American or Alaska Native alone (NH)	2	1	3	2	0.19%	0.09%	0.07%	0.03%
Asian alone (NH)	0	0	0	7	0.00%	0.00%	0.00%	0.11%
Pacific Islander alone (NH)	—	0	0	0	—	0.00%	0.00%	0.00%
Other race alone (NH)	0	0	0	7	0.00%	0.00%	0.00%	0.11%
Mixed race or multiracial (NH)	—	1	2	6	—	0.09%	0.05%	0.09%
Hispanic or Latino (any race)	1,049	1,144	4,323	6,323	97.40%	98.03%	98.18%	97.88%
Total	1,077	1,167	4,403	6,460	100.00%	100.00%	100.00%	100.00%

=== 2020 census ===
As of the 2020 census, there were 6,460 people, 1,736 households, 1,538 families residing in the city. The population density was 0.0 inhabitants per square mile (0.0/km^{2}). There were 1,985 housing units at an average density of 0.0 per square mile (0.0/km^{2}). The racial makeup of the city was 29.52% White, 0.23% African American, 0.74% Native American, 0.15% Asian, 0.02% Pacific Islander, 22.89% from some other races and 46.44% from two or more races. [[Hispanic and Latino Americans|Hispanic or Latino]] people of any race were 97.88% of the population.

=== 2010 census ===
As of the 2010 census, there were 4,403 people, 1,081 households, and _ families residing in the city. The population density was 0.0 inhabitants per square mile (0.0/km^{2}). There were 1,210 housing units at an average density of 0.0 per square mile (0.0/km^{2}). The racial makeup of the city was 99.39% White, 0.00% African American, 0.07% Native American, 0.02% Asian, 0.00% Pacific Islander, 0.41% from some other races and 0.11% from two or more races. [[Hispanic and Latino Americans|Hispanic or Latino]] people of any race were 98.18% of the population.

=== 2000 census ===
As of the 2000 census, there were 1,167 people, 319 households, and 279 families residing in the city. The population density was 582.1 inhabitants per square mile (224.8/km^{2}). There were 421 housing units at an average density of 210.0 per square mile (81.1/km^{2}). The racial makeup of the city was 83.29% White, 0.09% African American, 0.09% Native American, 0.00% Asian, 0.00% Pacific Islander, 16.20% from some other races and 0.34% from two or more races. [[Hispanic and Latino Americans|Hispanic or Latino]] people of any race were 98.03% of the population.

There were 319 households, out of which 48.9% had children under the age of 18 living with them, 73.7% were married couples living together, 10.7% had a female householder with no husband present, and 12.5% were non-families. 10.3% of all households were made up of individuals, and 6.3% had someone living alone who was 65 years of age or older. The average household size was 3.66 and the average family size was 3.99.

In the city, the population was spread out, with 32.9% under the age of 18, 10.5% from 18 to 24, 27.8% from 25 to 44, 19.6% from 45 to 64, and 9.1% who were 65 years of age or older. The median age was 29 years. For every 100 females, there were 91.0 males. For every 100 females age 18 and over, there were 86.4 males.

The median income for a household in the city was $26,071, and the median income for a family was $28,355. Males had a median income of $21,932 versus $14,583 for females. The per capita income for the city was $8,500. About 25.4% of families and 28.2% of the population were below the poverty line, including 32.9% of those under age 18 and 28.0% of those age 65 or over.

== Education ==
Peñitas is served by the La Joya Independent School District.

Schools include:

- John F. Kennedy "JFK" Elementary School
- Cesar E. Chavez Middle School
- La Joya High School

In addition, South Texas Independent School District operates magnet schools that serve the community.

== Government and infrastructure ==
The United States Postal Service operates the Peñitas Post Office.
