= Havana, Texas =

- Census-designated place
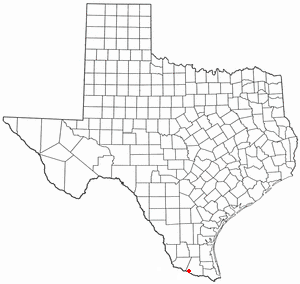
- Location of Havana, Texas

- Coordinates: 26°15′1″N 98°30′22″W
- Country: United States of America
- State: Texas
- County: Hidalgo

Area
  - Total: 0.81 sq mi (2.1 km^{2})
  - Land: 0.81 sq mi (2.1 km^{2})
  - Water: 0 sq mi (0.0 km^{2})
- Elevation: 157 ft (48 m)

Population (2020)
  - Total: 361
  - Density: 450/sq mi (170/km^{2})
- Time zone: UTC-6 (Central (CST))
  - Summer (DST): UTC-5 (CDT)
- ZIP code: 78572
- Area code: 956
- FIPS code: 48-32792
- GNIS feature ID: 1378428

Havana is a census-designated place (CDP) in Hidalgo County, Texas, United States. The population was 361 at the 2020 United States Census. It is part of the McAllen–Edinburg–Mission Metropolitan Statistical Area.

== Geography ==
Havana is located at 26°15′1″N 98°30′22″W (26.250269, -98.506181).

According to the United States Census Bureau, the CDP has a total area of 0.8 square miles (2.1 km^{2}), all land.

== Demographics ==
Historical population
Census	Pop.	Note	%±
2000	452		—
2010	407		−10.0%
2020	361		−11.3%
U.S. Decennial Census; 1850–1900 1910; 1920 1930 1940; 1950 1960 1970; 1980 1990 2000; 2010 2020

Havana first appeared as a census designated place in the 2000 U.S. census.

=== 2020 census ===
Havana CDP, Texas – Racial and ethnic composition Note: the US Census treats Hispanic/Latino as an ethnic category. This table excludes Latinos from the racial categories and assigns them to a separate category. Hispanics/Latinos may be of any race.
Race / Ethnicity (NH = Non-Hispanic)	Pop 2000	Pop 2010	Pop 2020	% 2000	% 2010	% 2020
White alone (NH)	6	2	3	1.33%	0.49%	0.83%
Black or African American alone (NH)	0	1	0	0.00%	0.25%	0.00%
Native American or Alaska Native alone (NH)	0	0	0	0.00%	0.00%	0.00%
Asian alone (NH)	0	0	1	0.00%	0.00%	0.28%
Native Hawaiian or Pacific Islander alone (NH)	0	0	0	0.00%	0.00%	0.00%
Other race alone (NH)	0	0	0	0.00%	0.00%	0.00%
Mixed race or Multiracial (NH)	0	0	0	0.00%	0.00%	0.00%
Hispanic or Latino (any race)	446	404	357	98.67%	99.26%	98.89%
Total	452	407	361	100.00%	100.00%	100.00%

At the 2000 census, there were 452 people, 108 households and 100 families residing in the CDP. The population density was 551.3 inhabitants per square mile (212.9/km^{2}). There were 125 housing units at an average density of 152.5 per square mile (58.9/km^{2}). The racial makeup of the CDP was 57.30% White, 0.66% Native American, 41.81% from other races, and 0.22% from two or more races. Hispanic or Latino of any race were 98.67% of the population.

There were 108 households, of which 58.3% had children under the age of 18 living with them, 71.3% were married couples living together, 15.7% had a female householder with no husband present, and 7.4% were non-families. 5.6% of all households were made up of individuals, and 3.7% had someone living alone who was 65 years of age or older. The average household size was 4.19 and the average family size was 4.26.

33.6% of the population were under the age of 18, 13.1% from 18 to 24, 29.6% from 25 to 44, 15.3% from 45 to 64, and 8.4% who were 65 years of age or older. The median age was 27 years. For every 100 females, there were 98.2 males. For every 100 females age 18 and over, there were 98.7 males.

The median household income was $21,346 and the median family income was $21,346. Males had a median income of $11,384 compared with $0 for females. The per capita income for the CDP was $5,345. About 39.4% of families and 35.8% of the population were below the poverty line, including 43.3% of those under age 18 and 59.5% of those age 65 or over.

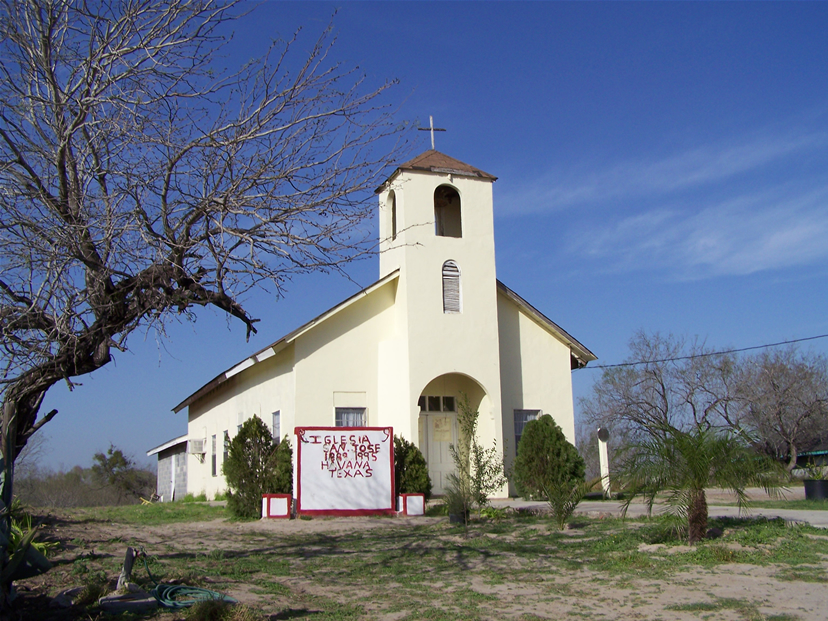
San Jose Church, Havana Tx. Est. 1880

== Education ==
Havana is served by the La Joya Independent School District. The zoned schools for residents are Sam Fordyce Elementary School, Lorenzo de Zavala Middle School, and La Joya High School.

In addition, South Texas Independent School District operates magnet schools that serve the community.
