= La Joya, Texas =

- City
- La Joya
- Nickname: The Jewel City
- Motto: The Jewel of the Rio Grande Valley
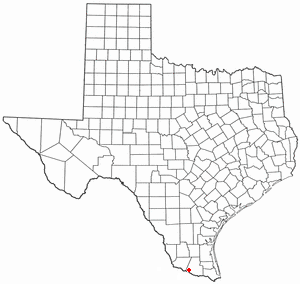
- Location of La Joya, Texas

- Coordinates: 26°14′31″N 98°28′48″W
- Country: United States
- State: Texas
- County: Hidalgo
- Incorporated: 1965

Area
  - Total: 4.38 sq mi (11.35 km^{2})
  - Land: 4.20 sq mi (10.89 km^{2})
  - Water: 0.18 sq mi (0.46 km^{2})
- Elevation: 174 ft (53 m)

Population (2020)
  - Total: 4,457
  - Density: 1,060/sq mi (409.3/km^{2})
- Time zone: UTC-6 (Central (CST))
  - Summer (DST): UTC-5 (CDT)
- ZIP code: 78560
- Area code: 956
- FIPS code: 48-40384
- GNIS feature ID: 1339334
- Website: www.cityoflajoya.com

La Joya is a city in Hidalgo County, Texas, United States. The population was 4,457 at the 2020 United States Census. It is part of the McAllen–Edinburg–Mission and Reynosa–McAllen metropolitan areas.

== History ==
Its name, meaning "the jewel", was inspired by a small natural lake west of the city; early settlers were said to observe that the lake shined in the sun like a jewel. The site on which La Joya was founded was part of what was known as "Los Ejidos de Reynosa Viejo". The ejidos were the shared grazing lands used for the livestock of the settlers of Reynosa Viejo ("Old Reynosa"). During the early 1800s, at the site of what is now La Joya, Francisco de la Garza, a descendant of the early colonizers of the area who soon decided to change his last name from de la Garza to Garza, founded a community, called "Tabasco", adjacent to the northern bank of the Rio Grande. It was a prosperous community that died out after floods in 1908 and 1909. The settlers moved their belongings just north to higher and less flood-prone ground, present-day La Joya.

== Geography ==
La Joya is located in southwestern Hidalgo County at 26°14′31″N 98°28′48″W (26.241996, –98.480138). It is bordered to the east by the city of Peñitas and to the west by unincorporated Havana. Interstate 2 passes through the center of La Joya, leading east 16 miles (26 km) to the center of McAllen and northwest 24 miles (39 km) to Rio Grande City.

According to the United States Census Bureau, La Joya has a total area of 4.4 square miles (11.4 km^{2}), of which 4.2 square miles (10.9 km^{2}) are land and 0.2 square miles (0.5 km^{2}), or 4.05%, are water. Walker Lake is in the southeastern part of the city limits.

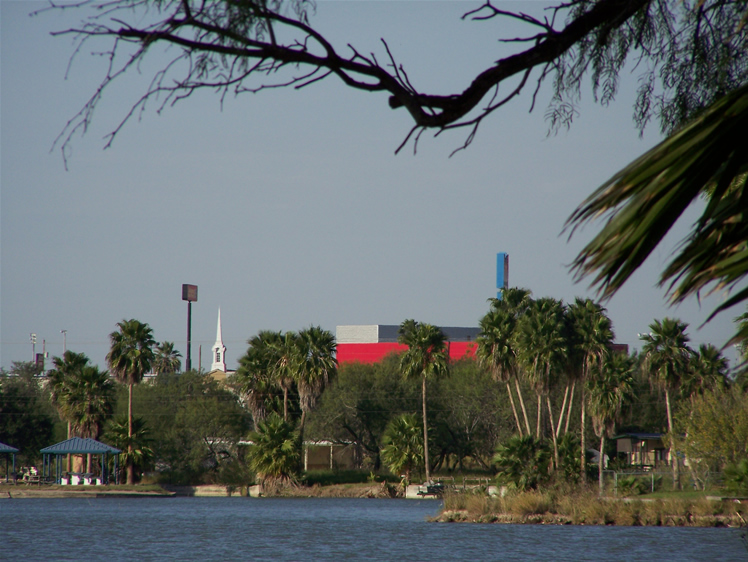
Walker Lake Reservoir

Climate data for La Joya, Texas (1981–2010)
Month	Jan	Feb	Mar	Apr	May	Jun	Jul	Aug	Sep	Oct	Nov	Dec	Year
Mean daily maximum °F (°C)	71.1 (21.7)	75.3 (24.1)	82.2 (27.9)	87.2 (30.7)	91.4 (33.0)	96.4 (35.8)	97.3 (36.3)	98.5 (36.9)	93.6 (34.2)	88.4 (31.3)	81.7 (27.6)	72.1 (22.3)	86.3 (30.2)
Mean daily minimum °F (°C)	48.0 (8.9)	51.5 (10.8)	57.5 (14.2)	63.7 (17.6)	70.8 (21.6)	75.2 (24.0)	75.7 (24.3)	75.8 (24.3)	72.1 (22.3)	64.8 (18.2)	56.8 (13.8)	47.8 (8.8)	63.3 (17.4)
Average precipitation inches (mm)	1.56 (40)	1.41 (36)	0.86 (22)	1.27 (32)	1.53 (39)	2.16 (55)	2.56 (65)	0.94 (24)	4.26 (108)	2.76 (70)	1.22 (31)	1.50 (38)	22.03 (560)
Source: NOAA

== Demographics ==
Historical population
Census	Pop.	Note	%±
1970	1,217		—
1980	2,018		65.8%
1990	2,604		29.0%
2000	3,303		26.8%
2010	3,985		20.6%
2020	4,457		11.8%
U.S. Decennial Census

=== 2020 census ===
As of the 2020 census, La Joya had a population of 4,457, 1,346 households, and 880 families residing in the city. The median age was 31.2 years; 30.4% of residents were under the age of 18 and 12.2% of residents were 65 years of age or older. For every 100 females there were 93.5 males, and for every 100 females age 18 and over there were 86.7 males age 18 and over.

99.4% of residents lived in urban areas, while 0.6% lived in rural areas.

There were 1,346 households in La Joya, of which 51.5% had children under the age of 18 living in them. Of all households, 51.7% were married-couple households, 12.6% were households with a male householder and no spouse or partner present, and 30.6% were households with a female householder and no spouse or partner present. About 14.1% of all households were made up of individuals and 5.6% had someone living alone who was 65 years of age or older.

There were 1,512 housing units, of which 11.0% were vacant. The homeowner vacancy rate was 2.0% and the rental vacancy rate was 8.1%.

Racial composition as of the 2020 census
Race	Number	Percent
White	1,466	32.9%
Black or African American	11	0.2%
American Indian and Alaska Native	31	0.7%
Asian	5	0.1%
Native Hawaiian and Other Pacific Islander	1	0.0%
Some other race	951	21.3%
Two or more races	1,992	44.7%
Hispanic or Latino (of any race)	4,332	97.2%

=== 2000 census ===
As of the census of 2000, there were 3,303 people, 860 households, and 766 families residing in the city. The population density was 1,187.6 inhabitants per square mile (458.5/km^{2}). There were 969 housing units at an average density of 348.4 per square mile (134.5/km^{2}). The racial makeup of the city was 63.94% White, 0.18% African American, 0.51% Native American, 0.48% Asian, 0.03% Pacific Islander, 33.18% from other races, and 1.67% from two or more races. Hispanic or Latino of any race were 97.18% of the population (Latinos and Hispanics are not an official race).

There were 860 households, out of which 51.3% had children under the age of 18 living with them, 66.0% were married couples living together, 18.8% had a female householder with no husband present, and 10.9% were non-families. 9.2% of all households were made up of individuals, and 5.1% had someone living alone who was 65 years of age or older. The average household size was 3.84 and the average family size was 4.10.

In the city, the population was spread out, with 34.9% under the age of 18, 12.2% from 18 to 24, 27.0% from 25 to 44, 17.4% from 45 to 64, and 8.4% who were 65 years of age or older. The median age was 27 years. For every 100 females, there were 88.7 males. For every 100 females age 18 and over, there were 86.1 males.

The median income for a household in the city was $22,820, and the median income for a family was $23,156. Males had a median income of $18,494 versus $14,597 for females. The per capita income for the city was $7,923. About 38.9% of families and 40.7% of the population were below the poverty line, including 50.6% of those under age 18 and 31.2% of those age 65 or over.

== Government and infrastructure ==
The United States Postal Service operates the La Joya Post Office.

== Education ==
La Joya is served by the La Joya Independent School District. The zoned schools for residents of La Joya city are Tabasco Elementary School, Lorenzo de Zavala Middle School, and La Joya High School.

In addition, residents are allowed to apply to magnet schools operated by the South Texas Independent School District.

La Joya Public Library is located in the city.

== Notable people ==
- Sergio Castillo, CFL Winnipeg Blue Bombers Place Kicker, 2021 Grey Cup Champion
- Macarena Hernandez, award-winning journalist, educator and La Joya High School graduate
- Mayra Rosales, one of the heaviest women of all time
