= Palmview, Texas =

- City
- Nickname: City of Palms
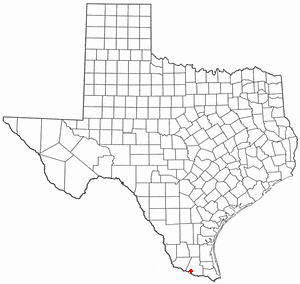
- Location of Palmview, Texas

- Coordinates: 26°13′36″N 98°22′32″W
- Country: United States of America
- State: Texas
- County: Hidalgo
- Incorporated: 1978

Government
  - Mayor: Ricardo Villarreal
  - Mayor Pro-Tem: Alexandra Flores

Area
  - Total: 7.61 sq mi (19.71 km^{2})
  - Land: 7.58 sq mi (19.63 km^{2})
  - Water: 0.035 sq mi (0.09 km^{2})
- Elevation: 148.1 ft (45.15 m)

Population (2020)
  - Total: 15,830
  - Density: 2,297/sq mi (886.9/km^{2})
- Time zone: UTC-6 (Central (CST))
  - Summer (DST): UTC-5 (CDT)
- ZIP codes: 78539, 78572
- Area code: 956
- FIPS code: 48-54804
- GNIS feature ID: 1388588
- Website: cityofpalmview.gov

Palmview is a city in Hidalgo County, Texas, United States. Its population is 17,410 as of the 2020 United States Census. It is part of the McAllen–Edinburg–Mission and Reynosa–McAllen metropolitan areas.

== Geography ==
Palmview is in southwestern Hidalgo County, to the west of Mission. Interstate 2 passes through the city as a freeway, leading east 10 miles (16 km) to McAllen and west 30 miles (48 km) to Rio Grande City.

According to the United States Census Bureau, Palmview has a total area of 7.61 square miles (19.71 km^{2}), all land.

== Demographics ==
Historical population
Census	Pop.	Note	%±
1980	683		—
1990	1,818		166.2%
2000	4,107		125.9%
2010	5,460		32.9%
2020	15,830		189.9%
U.S. Decennial Census

=== 2020 census ===
As of the 2020 census, Palmview had a population of 15,830 and 4,261 families. The median age was 33.7 years. 27.6% of residents were under the age of 18 and 14.9% of residents were 65 years of age or older. For every 100 females there were 94.5 males, and for every 100 females age 18 and over there were 91.1 males age 18 and over.

Racial composition as of the 2020 census
Race	Number	Percent
White	5,408	34.2%
Black or African American	34	0.2%
American Indian and Alaska Native	86	0.5%
Asian	15	0.1%
Native Hawaiian and Other Pacific Islander	0	0.0%
Some other race	3,512	22.2%
Two or more races	6,775	42.8%
Hispanic or Latino (of any race)	14,705	92.9%

100.0% of residents lived in urban areas, while 0.0% lived in rural areas.

There were 4,641 households in Palmview, of which 44.8% had children under the age of 18 living in them. Of all households, 57.6% were married-couple households, 13.3% were households with a male householder and no spouse or partner present, and 25.1% were households with a female householder and no spouse or partner present. About 14.5% of all households were made up of individuals and 7.7% had someone living alone who was 65 years of age or older.

There were 5,789 housing units, of which 19.8% were vacant. The homeowner vacancy rate was 1.2% and the rental vacancy rate was 9.0%.

=== 2000 census ===
As of the 2000 census, 4,107 people, 1,093 households, and 977 families were residing in the city. The population density was 1,712.5 inhabitants per square mile (661.2/km^{2}). The 1,671 housing units had an average density of 696.7 per square mile (269.0/km^{2}). The racial makeup of the city was 67.35% White, 0.02% Black, 0.12% Native American, 0.12% Asian, 31.19% from other races, and 1.19% from two or more races. Hispanics or Latinos of any race were 93.21% of the population.

Of the 1,093 households, 57.7% had children under 18 living with them, 73.8% were married couples living together, 12.0% had a female householder with no husband present, and 10.6% were not families. About 9.2% of all households were made up of individuals, and 4.8% had someone living alone who was 65 or older. The average household size was 3.76 and the average family size was 4.01.

In the city, the age distribution was 37.2% under 18, 12.0% from 18 to 24, 29.0% from 25 to 44, 13.5% from 45 to 64, and 8.3% who were 65 or older. The median age was 26 years. For every 100 females, there were 96.5 males. For every 100 females 18 and over, there were 89.0 males.

The median income for a household in the city was $35,684, and for a family was $33,953. Males had a median income of $27,884 versus $23,577 for females. The per capita income for the city was $11,585. About 25.2% of families and 30.3% of the population were below the poverty line, including 35.1% of those under 18 and 11.1% of those 65 or over.

== Education ==
Palmview is served by the La Joya Independent School District. Zoned schools include:

- Elementary: Enrique Camarena, Guillermo Flores, Henry B. González, Leo J. Leo, and E. B. Reyna
- Middle: C. Chavez, Irene Garcia, Memorial, and A. Richards
- Palmview High School and La Joya High School

In addition, South Texas Independent School District and IDEA Public Schools (charter) operate magnet schools that serve the community.

== Commute ==
The average commute time to work in the city of Palmview is 18.4 min. The average car ownership in Palmview is 2.2 vehicles per family.
