= Natalia Anciso =

Chicana-Tejana visual artist

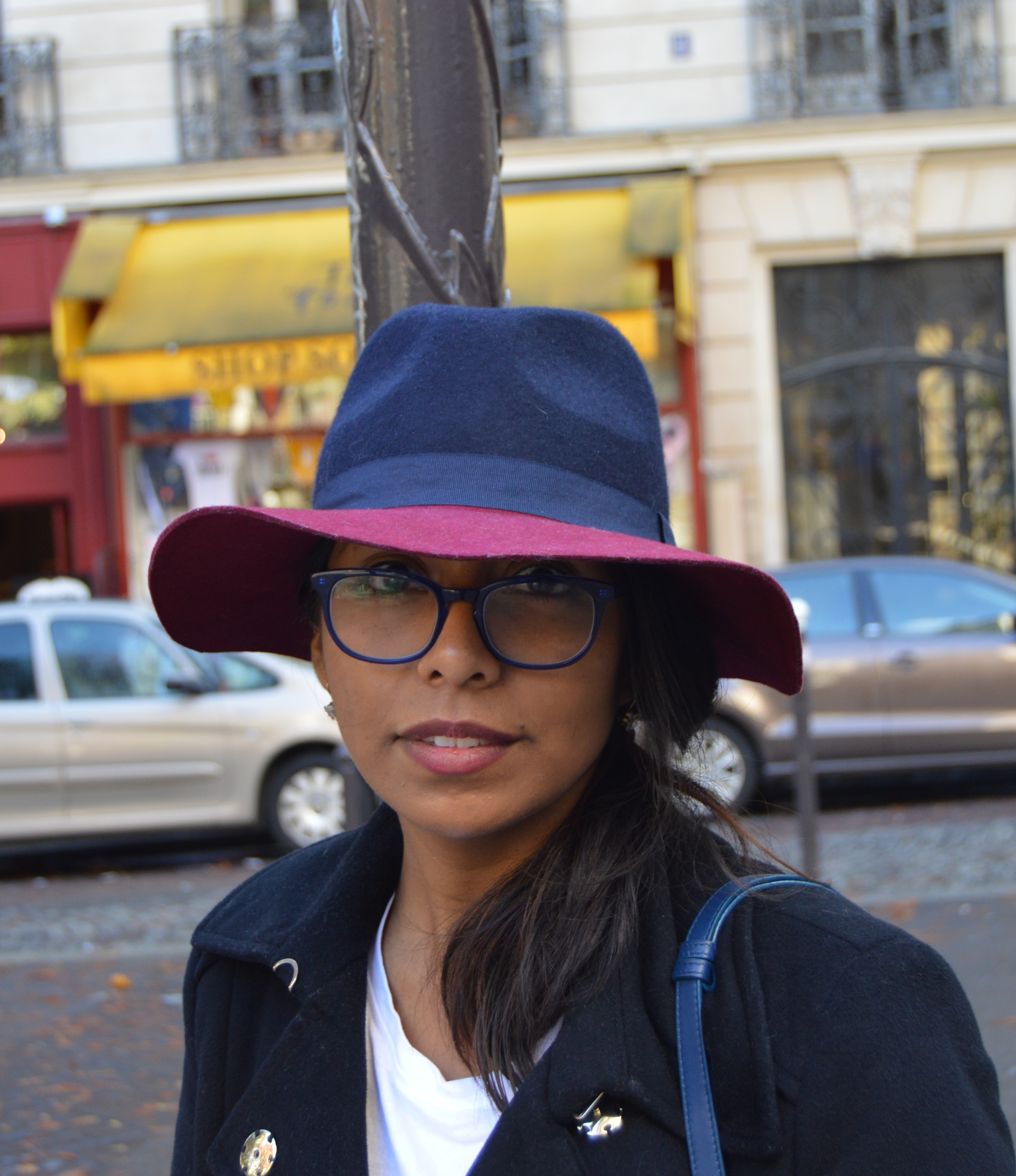
- Natalia Anciso in Paris, 2015.
- Born: March 25, 1985 (age 41); Weslaco, Texas
- Education: The University of Texas at Austin; California College of the Arts; University of California, Berkeley
- Known for: Visual art, installation art
- Notable work: Smile Series, Pinches Rinches Series, Platicando con las Comadres, School Series, Don't Shoot
- Movement: Contemporary art

Natalia Anciso (born March 25, 1985) is an American Chicana-Tejana contemporary artist and educator. Her artwork focuses primarily on issues involving Identity, especially as it pertains to her experiences growing up along the U.S.-Mexico Border, via visual art and installation art. Her more recent work covers topics related to education, human rights, and social justice, which is informed by her experience as an urban educator in the San Francisco Bay Area. She is a native of the Rio Grande Valley of South Texas and currently lives and works in Oakland, California.

== Biography ==
Natalia Anciso was born in Weslaco, Texas in 1985, the eldest of three children to Armando and Idalia Anciso. A fifth-generation Tejana, her family has resided along the Texas Borderlands since the Texas Revolution. Her family lineage has been traced to San Nicolás de los Garza near Monterrey, in the Mexican state of Nuevo León, as well as to Tejones y Sacatiles Indians indigenous to the areas surrounding the Zacatal Ranch between Relampago and Santa Maria, along the Rio Grande.

Shortly after her birth, Anciso's family moved to Austin, where they would reside until she was the age of 10. She would eventually move back to the Rio Grande Valley to her parents' hometown of Mercedes, Texas, graduating from Mercedes High School in 2003. Coming from a long line of migrant farmworkers and laborers, Anciso is the first in her family to graduate from college. She earned her B.A. in Studio Art at The University of Texas at Austin in 2008, before moving to the Fruitvale District of Oakland, California, earning her Master of Fine Arts at California College of the Arts in 2011. A Berkeley Distinguished Graduate Fellow, Anciso earned her M.A. in Education at the University of California, Berkeley Graduate School of Education in 2015.

== Work ==
=== Art ===
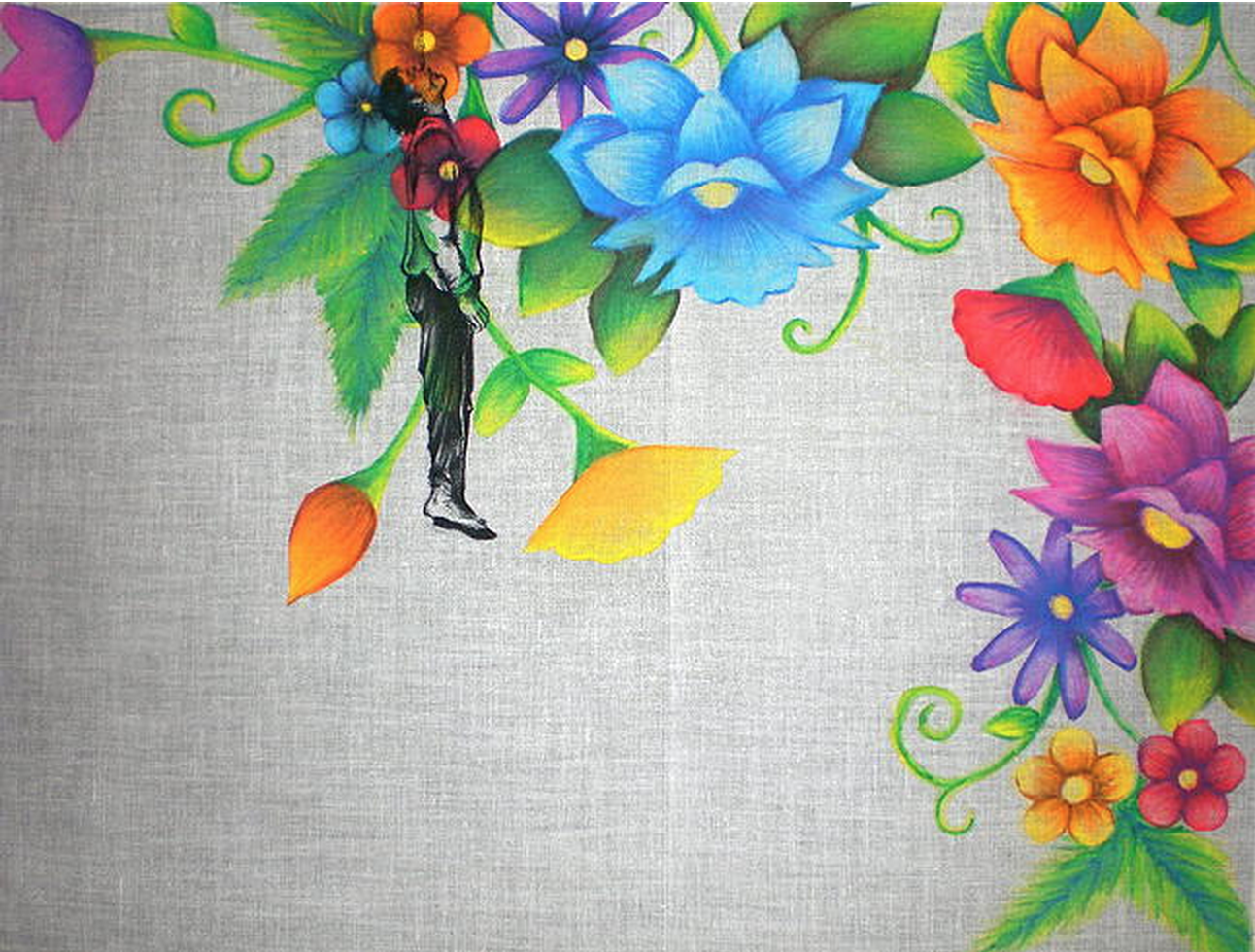
Pinches Rinches (detail), "Joe" (2011) by Natalia Anciso. Pen, watercolor, and embroidery on fabric.

Anciso creates art predicated on realities and legends of her upbringing. Her works are visual records of family, community, and border culture along her native Rio Grande. Her work has historically covered issues surrounding the Borderlands, which have long been subject to poverty, human trafficking, and the drug war. She depicts Chicano history and struggles on both sides of the border in her work, especially as it pertains to the notion of Identity.

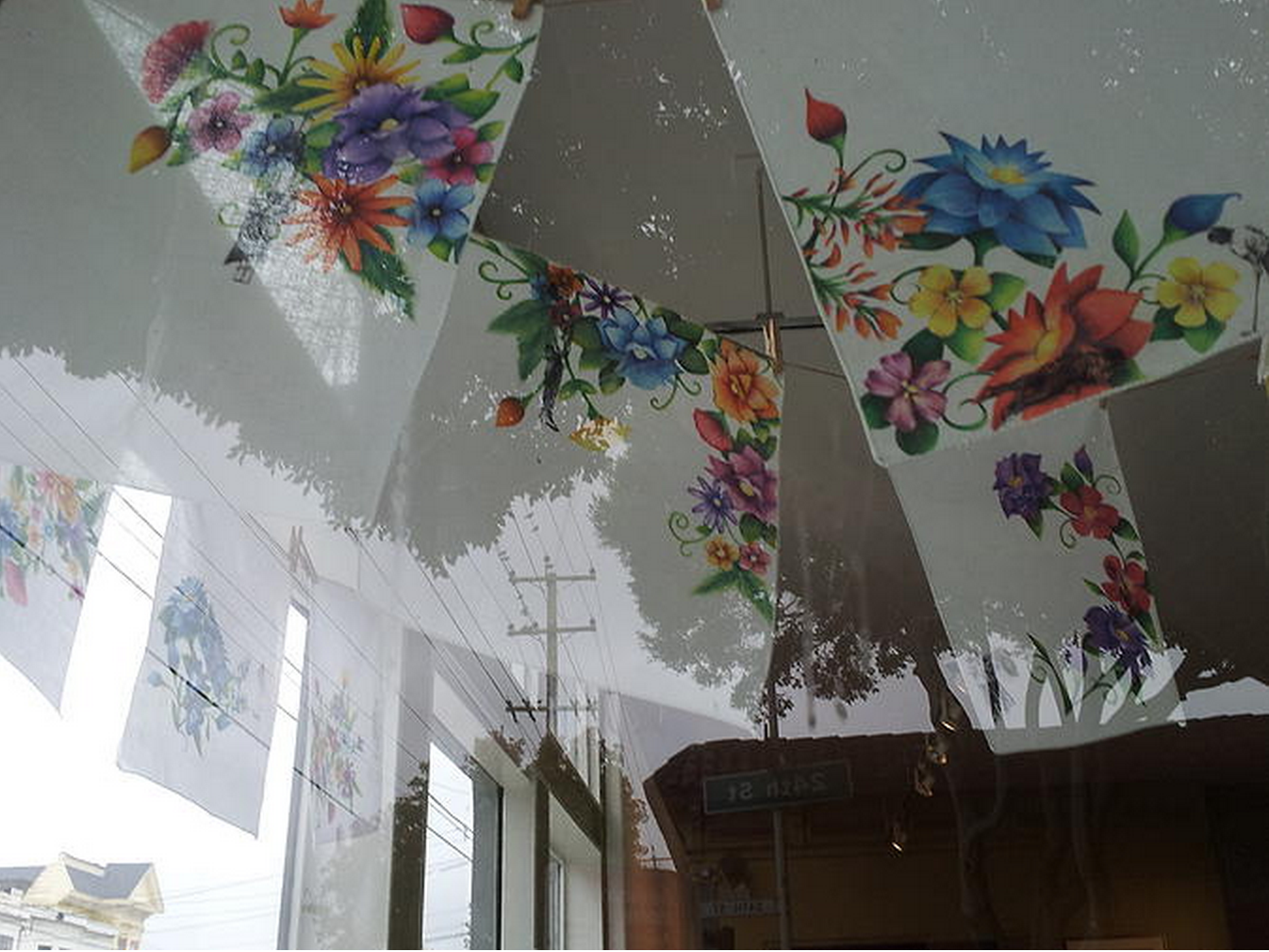
Pinches Rinches Series by Natalia Anciso, as seen from Galeria de la Raza's Studio 24, on the corner of 24th and Bryant in the Mission District of San Francisco.

Anciso researches vernacular arts like pano arte, handkerchief art believed to have emerged from Chicano prisoners in the 1940s, and the huipil, embroidered Mayan textiles worn by indigenous women in Southern and Central America. These art forms are reconfigured to tell contemporary stories of life along the Texas/Mexico border. Using pen, pencil, and paint on domestic textiles such as handkerchiefs, pillowcases, and bed sheets, Anciso's work examines psycho-political struggles of life along La Frontera. Specific subjects include the lynchings of Mexicans and Tejanos in Texas from the Texas Rangers, as evident in her Pinches Rinches series, which draws from both historical references and stories of her family in the Rio Grande Valley.

Much of Anciso's research and work surrounding her native Borderlands and her personal identity as a Mexican-American, informed a deeper self-critique and understanding of the complexities of being a Tejana in the Rio Grande Valley. On bridging her dual identities as both a Texan and as an American-born Mexican, Anciso came to a new realization of herself and identity.

I love having those two cultures...I love that duality, that being in between. I didn’t like it in the beginning, but now that I’m older, I love it. I’m proud to be Mexican. I’m proud to be Tejana.

Her most recent work covers issues around education, human rights, class and race, as evident in her piece, Don't Shoot (2014), which is featured as the cover of the globally-released human rights education book, Bringing Human Rights Education to US Classrooms: Exemplary Models from Elementary Grades to University, published by London-based Palgrave Macmillan and edited by University of San Francisco professors, Dr. Susan Roberta Katz and Dr. Andrea McEvoy Spero. In the book's final chapter titled, "Afterword: Will Human Rights Education Be Decolonizing?," Dr. K. Wayne Yang, associate professor of ethnic studies at University of California, San Diego, makes a reference to Anciso and connects her work on her native La Frontera in the Texas Borderlands with that of the plight of "urban frontiers" in Detroit, Ferguson, Oakland, New Orleans and Watts, Los Angeles.

Anciso's art has been included in exhibitions throughout the country and internationally. Her work has been exhibited at venues including the San Jose Museum of Art, the Oakland Museum of California, the Vincent Price Art Museum of Los Angeles (as part of the MexiCali Biennial), the Mexic-Arte Museum of Austin, the Smithsonian-affiliated Alameda National Center for Latino Arts and Culture of San Antonio, the National Museum of Mexican Art and the Center for Book and Paper Arts in Chicago, Centro Cultural de la Raza of San Diego, Galeria de la Raza of San Francisco, the historic residence museum of the Sam and Alfreda Maloof Foundation for the Arts and Crafts, a Smithsonian Affiliate in Alta Loma, California (in conjunction with Los Angeles-based Craft in America), the National Hispanic Cultural Center Art Museum in Albuquerque and Recyclart in Brussels, Belgium.

=== Education ===
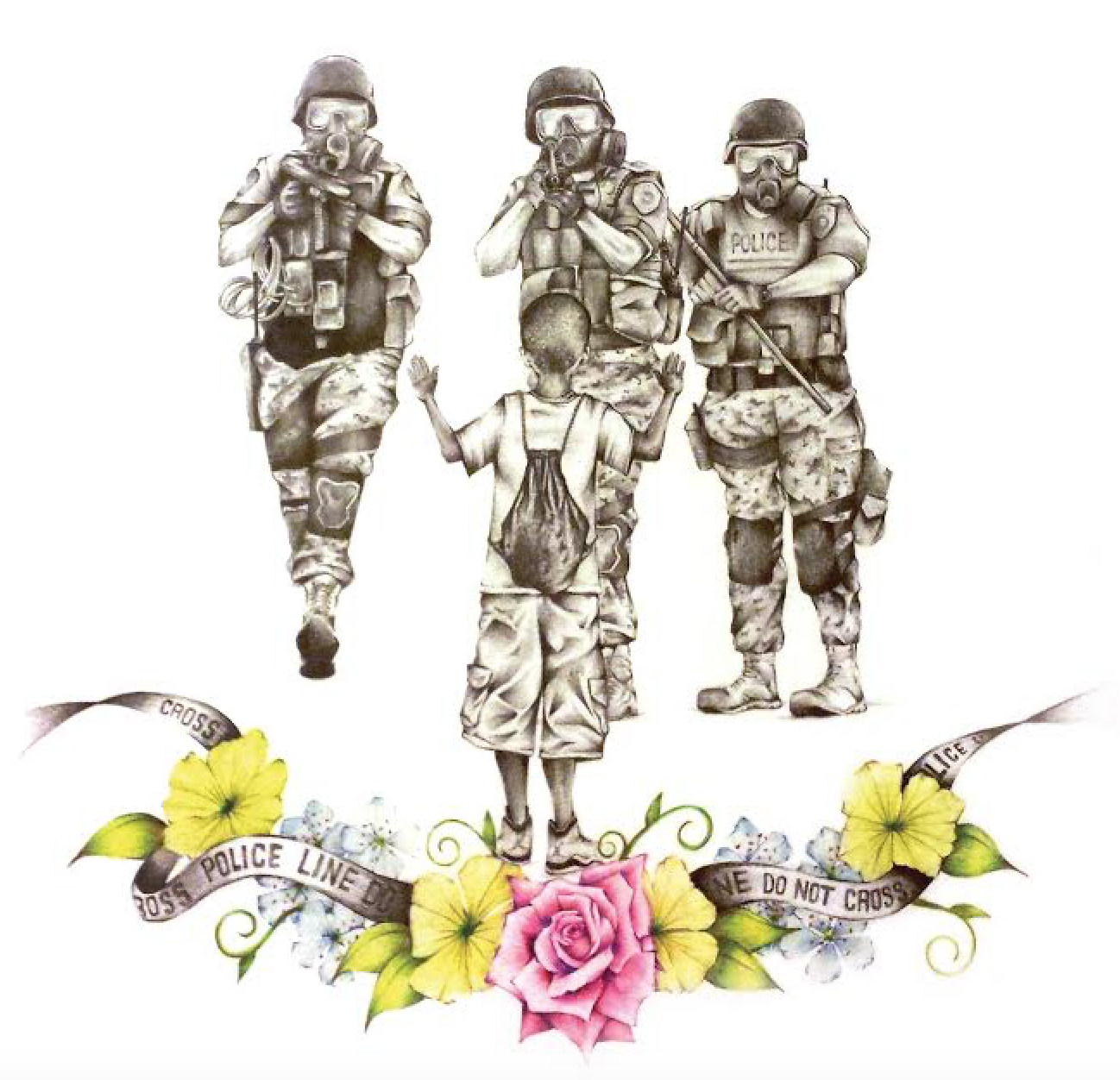
Don't Shoot (2014) by Natalia Anciso. Made with Ink, graphite, prisma, and watercolor on paper.

In addition to practicing art and exhibiting her work, Anciso has taught art to a diverse array of youth through non-profit organizations, ranging from the Oakland Leaf Foundation's Urban Arts Program in the Fruitvale District of East Oakland to the Summer Institute for the Gifted at the University of California, Berkeley. She also worked as Art Director for the Mission Clubhouse of the Boys & Girls Clubs of San Francisco.

For several years, she has taught Grades K-8 as a substitute teacher, both day-to-day and long-term, in the San Lorenzo Unified School District, the San Leandro Unified School District, and the Oakland Unified School District. In fulfillment of her teaching credential requirements, Anciso finished her student teaching in elementary schools in East Oakland through the University of California, Berkeley Graduate School of Education's Developmental Teacher Education program. She currently teaches full-time at an urban elementary school in the East Bay.

Anciso has collaborated with the likes of the Princeton Theological Seminary's Zoe Project and the Rex Foundation's The World As It Could Be Human Rights Education Program.

She has also facilitated various art workshops as a guest lecturer and speaker to undergraduates, as well as Master's and Doctoral students through the University of San Francisco School of Education, the University of Illinois at Urbana-Champaign (with the campus's MEChA organization), and The George Washington University among other venues and forums.

== Recognition ==
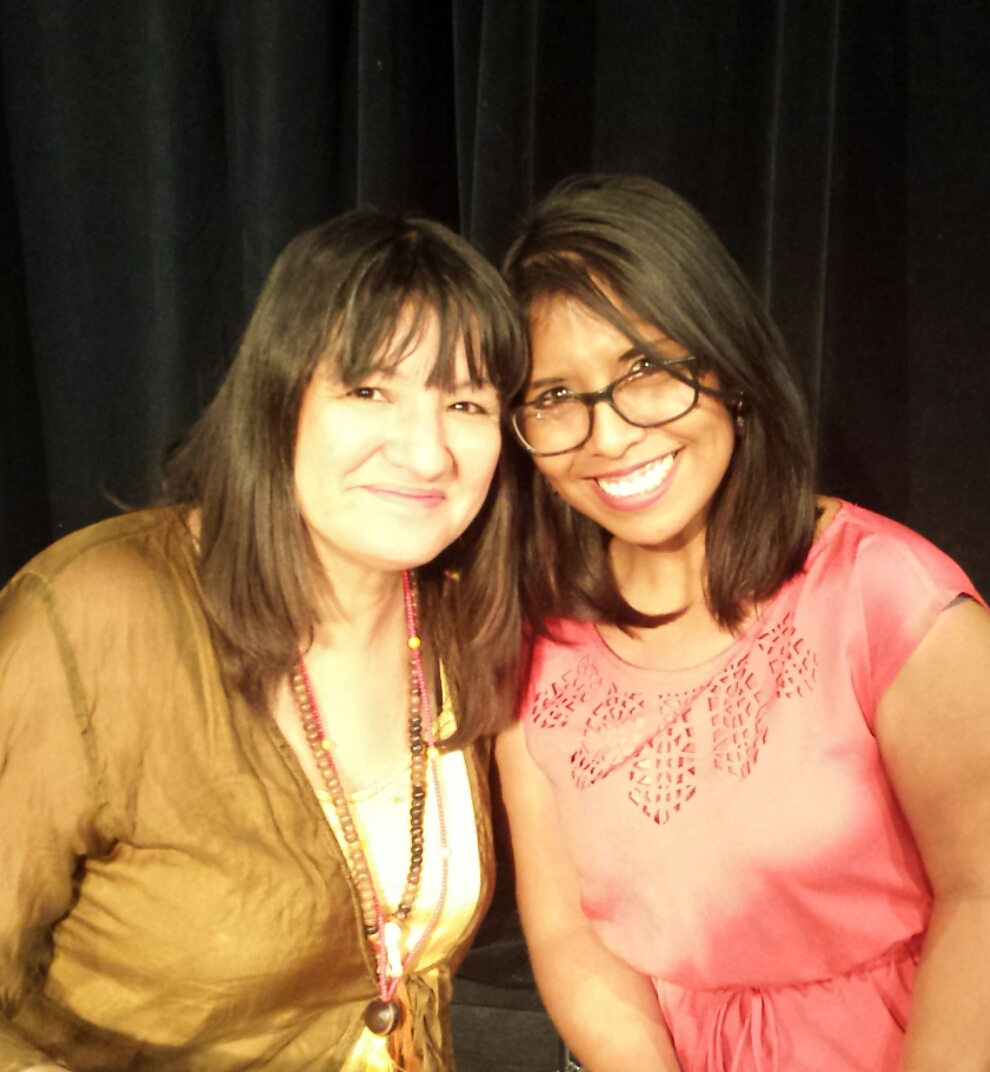
Natalia Anciso (right) with author Sandra Cisneros (left)

Anciso's contributions as an artist have been acknowledged by The Huffington Post, who identified her as one of "13 Latina Artists Under 35 You Should Know," as well as Latina Magazine, which named her as an Innovator in their Latina 30 Under 30 list of the "Brightest Young Stars in Film, Music, Social Media and Activism."

Anciso was included in Elle Magazine's 30th Anniversary Issue, as part of its feature portfolio, “This is 30,” which was photographed by renowned American photographer Mark Seliger, and styled by Brandon Maxwell. The portfolio highlights 35 women who are recognized as "outstanding musicians, comedians, politicians, artists, activists, novelists, athletes, and actors" who turned 30 in 2015. She appears in a double-page spread with supermodel, Bar Refaeli, actress, model and trans activist, Carmen Carrera, and actress and recording artist, Mary Elizabeth Winstead.

More recently, TVyNovelas named Anciso to their "Lideres de la Hispanidad/Los 50 hispanos más importantes de hoy" list of accomplished Latinos. In the Arte category, she is joined by Los Angeles Philharmonic music director, Gustavo Dudamel, and photographer, Omar Cruz.

On the day of his confirmation, 10th United States Secretary of Education John King, Jr. referenced Anciso alongside other contemporary artists in his piece for Medium, titled, "What I Hope Students (and Education Policymakers) will see in Hamilton," highlighting Lin-Manuel Miranda's hit Broadway musical, Hamilton, and the importance of social studies, civic education, and the arts. In it he asks, "How can we expect a student to make the next Hamilton or to become the next Kara Walker, Natalia Anciso, or Kehinde Wiley if she's never been inside a theater, analyzed a painting, or had the chance to deeply study American history?"
