= South Texas Preparatory Academy =

South Texas Preparatory Academy (STPA)

Location
- 724 Sugar Road; Edinburg, TX, Texas 78539; United States; 26.297406°N 98.178074°W

Information
- Type: Public junior high school
- Motto: "We are leaders! We are Spartans!"
- Established: 2008
- School district: South Texas Independent School District
- Principal: Marco Zamora
- Faculty: 40.78(on FTE basis)
- Grades: 6–8
- Enrollment: 573 (2017-18)
- Student to teacher ratio: 14.05
- Mascot: Spartans
- Website: STPA

South Texas Preparatory Academy, also known as 'STPA', is part of the South Texas Independent School District, in Edinburg, Texas, United States.

STPA is a tuition-free magnet junior high school for students in a three-county area along the Texas-Mexico border (Hidalgo, Willacy and Cameron).

The school was founded in 2008 as South Texas Preparatory Academy. It previously shared the name South Texas BETA with its neighboring South Texas Business Education & Technology Academy from 2003 to 2008, and before that it was named the Teacher Academy of South Texas. In 2008 the South Texas ISD School Board decided to split up the Jr. High and High School, which are now independently their own name, STPA and BETA, respectively.

STPA serves 6th, 7th, and 8th grade, after leaving STPA, students choose to go to one of four high schools in the STISD district; South Texas ISD World Scholars, The Science Academy of South Texas, South Texas High School for Health Professions, and South Texas ISD Medical Professions. It has also been recognized as a blue ribbon school in the 2015–2016 academic school year.
