= Biblioteca Las Américas =

- 26.1567°N 97.9410°W
- Location: Mercedes, Texas, USA
- Established: January 5, 1998
- Branch of: South Texas Independent School District
- Branches: 3

Collection
- Items collected: books, journals, ebooks, periodicals, art, videos, microfiches
- Size: 50,000+ print volumes

Access and use
- Population served: 1,600 high school students

Other information
- Director: Lucy Hansen
- Employees: 13
- Website: http://bla.stisd.net/

Biblioteca Las Américas (BLA) is the main library of the South Texas Independent School District.

== History ==
Groundbreaking for Biblioteca Las Américas took place on November 21, 1996, and it opened on January 5, 1998. The dedication of BLA took place on January 21, 1998, with featured speaker Barbara Bush. BLA comprises 33,370 square feet and is located in the Mercedes complex of South Texas Independent School District. This library is shared by two campuses: The Science Academy of South Texas and South Texas High School for Health Professions.
