= Vital Information for a Virtual Age =

- Abbreviation: ¡VIVA!
- Formation: 2001

Vital Information for a Virtual Age, also known as '¡VIVA!', is to empower high school students and assist them in serving their communities; to improve the awareness and use of quality health information resources in communities; and to create student-centered programs for community health outreach.

== History ==
In 2001, four juniors from Med High were selected to be part of the Peer Tutor project at Biblioteca Las Américas to teach MedlinePlus and PubMed to their peers, their families and the staff of Med High. Goals included increasing the utilization of MedlinePlus and other health information resources and obtaining feedback about factors that are important to users of these information resources. The project continues to grow with more peer tutors being included each year. Services expand each year as well, educating community groups about the valuable information resources offered by NLM.

== Funding ==
This project has been funded in whole or in part with Federal funds from the National Library of Medicine, National Institutes of Health, under Contract No. HHSN-276-2011-00007-C with the Houston Academy of Medicine-Texas Medical Center Library.

== Awards ==
- 2012 National School Library Media Program of the Year - District libraries category.
- 2006 National School Library Media Program of the Year - Individual Library category.
- 2004 U.S. National Commission on Libraries and Information Science Blue Ribbon Consumer Health Information Recognition Awards. We shared this award for libraries with the RAHC.
- 2004 The Institute of Museum and Library Services National Award for Museum and Library Service was awarded to the Regional Academic Health Center, in part, for their Train the Trainer approach in their partnership with Med High.
- 2003 Texas Library Association Project of the Year.
- 2003 Med High project using MedlinePlus won second place at the state Health Occupations Student Association (HOSA) meet.

== Publications ==
Click here to view a complete list of publications.

- Helping Friends and Family Find Health Information: A Photovoice Evaluation of Teens Promoting MedlinePlus presented at MLA 2014 in a poster session.
- NN/LM Evaluation Liaisons’ Teleconference

September 28, 2010 “Adolescent Health Literacy: The Importance of Credible Sources” Dr. Suad Ghaddar, Associate Director at the South Texas Border Health Disparities Center at The University of Texas-Pan American

- Reibman, Sara, and Heike Piornak. "Can I Trust This Website? - Read, Think, Use." Englisch Sekundarstufe I Oct. 2007: 20 pp.
- Peer Power PLUS an online symposium on peer tutors, online health resources, and community outreach presented at MLA 2007 in a poster session.
- Teens Promote Health Awareness ¡VIVA! Peer Tutor Summer Institutes 2005-2007 presented at MLA 2007 in a poster session.
- High school peer tutors teach MedlinePlus: a model for Hispanic outreach. Warner DG, Olney CA, Wood FB, Hansen L, Bowden VM.
