= Heidelberg, Texas =

- Census-designated place
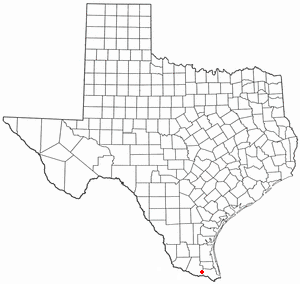
- Location of Heidelberg, Texas

- Coordinates: 26°11′15″N 97°52′59″W
- Country: United States of America
- State: Texas
- County: Hidalgo

Area
  - Total: 2.9 sq mi (7.4 km^{2})
  - Land: 2.9 sq mi (7.4 km^{2})
  - Water: 0 sq mi (0.0 km^{2})
- Elevation: 59 ft (18 m)

Population (2020)
  - Total: 1,507
  - Density: 530/sq mi (200/km^{2})
- Time zone: UTC-6 (Central (CST))
  - Summer (DST): UTC-5 (CDT)
- ZIP code: 78570
- Area code: 956
- FIPS code: 48-33092
- GNIS feature ID: 1337561

Heidelberg is a census-designated place (CDP) in Hidalgo County, Texas, United States. The population was 1,507 at the 2020 United States Census. It is part of the McAllen–Edinburg–Mission Metropolitan Statistical Area.

== Geography ==
Heidelberg is located at 26°11′15″N 97°52′59″W (26.187387, -97.883154) about 21 km north of the US/Mexico border at Progreso.

It is a small residential community, grouped around Heidelberg Park.

According to the United States Census Bureau, the CDP has a total area of 2.8 square miles (7.3 km^{2}), all land.

== Demographics ==
Historical population
Census	Pop.	Note	%±
2000	1,586		—
2010	1,725		8.8%
2020	1,507		−12.6%
U.S. Decennial Census; 1850–1900 1910; 1920 1930 1940; 1950 1960 1970; 1980 1990 2000; 2010 2020

Heidelberg first appeared as a census designated place in the 2000 U.S. census.

=== 2020 census ===
Heidelberg CDP, Texas – Racial and ethnic composition Note: the US Census treats Hispanic/Latino as an ethnic category. This table excludes Latinos from the racial categories and assigns them to a separate category. Hispanics/Latinos may be of any race.
Race / Ethnicity (NH = Non-Hispanic)	Pop 2000	Pop 2010	Pop 2020	% 2000	% 2010	% 2020
White alone (NH)	75	50	30	4.73%	2.90%	1.99%
Black or African American alone (NH)	2	0	2	0.13%	0.00%	0.13%
Native American or Alaska Native alone (NH)	1	0	0	0.06%	0.00%	0.00%
Asian alone (NH)	0	0	0	0.00%	0.00%	0.00%
Native Hawaiian or Pacific Islander alone (NH)	0	1	0	0.00%	0.06%	0.00%
Other race alone (NH)	1	1	0	0.06%	0.06%	0.00%
Mixed race or Multiracial (NH)	0	4	0	0.00%	0.23%	0.00%
Hispanic or Latino (any race)	1,507	1,669	1,475	95.02%	96.75%	97.88%
Total	1,586	1,725	1,507	100.00%	100.00%	100.00%

As of the census of 2000, there were 1,586 people, 371 households, and 339 families residing in the CDP. The population density was 558.2 inhabitants per square mile (215.5/km^{2}). There were 423 housing units at an average density of 148.9 per square mile (57.5/km^{2}). The racial makeup of the CDP was 81.59% White, 0.13% African American, 0.38% Native American, 17.02% from other races, and 0.88% from two or more races. Hispanic or Latino of any race were 95.02% of the population.

There were 371 households, out of which 55.5% had children under the age of 18 living with them, 70.9% were married couples living together, 16.4% had a female householder with no husband present, and 8.4% were non-families. 7.3% of all households were made up of individuals, and 4.3% had someone living alone who was 65 years of age or older. The average household size was 4.27 and the average family size was 4.51.

In the CDP, the population was spread out, with 39.4% under the age of 18, 12.6% from 18 to 24, 23.6% from 25 to 44, 17.1% from 45 to 64, and 7.3% who were 65 years of age or older. The median age was 24 years. For every 100 females, there were 98.5 males. For every 100 females age 18 and over, there were 96.1 males.

The median income for a household in the CDP was $15,926, and the median income for a family was $16,759. Males had a median income of $12,663 versus $13,036 for females. The per capita income for the CDP was $4,922. About 40.3% of families and 42.9% of the population were below the poverty line, including 45.8% of those under age 18 and 39.1% of those age 65 or over.

== Climate ==
Heidelberg possesses a humid subtropical climate (Köppen Cfa): winters are mild to warm, summers are hot and humid. Due to its proximity to the deserts of Chihuahua and Gulf Coastal Plains, Heidelberg's geographic location lies near the boundary of a hot semi-arid climate. Snow is a very rare event in Heidelberg. Heidelberg has a wet season concentrated during the late summer and early fall months, peaking in September, when the threat from tropical cyclones is greatest. In most years, November through April is the dry season. Moreover, Heidelberg receives modest annual rainfall, averaging about 24.8 in (630 mm) annually.

Climate data for Heidelberg, Texas
Month	Jan	Feb	Mar	Apr	May	Jun	Jul	Aug	Sep	Oct	Nov	Dec	Year
Mean daily maximum °F (°C)	69.8 (21.0)	73.6 (23.1)	79.6 (26.4)	85.0 (29.4)	89.7 (32.1)	93.7 (34.3)	94.8 (34.9)	96.0 (35.6)	91.7 (33.2)	86.7 (30.4)	79.3 (26.3)	71.4 (21.9)	84.3 (29.1)
Mean daily minimum °F (°C)	48.9 (9.4)	52.0 (11.1)	57.4 (14.1)	63.9 (17.7)	70.4 (21.3)	74.3 (23.5)	75.0 (23.9)	75.2 (24.0)	72.1 (22.3)	65.6 (18.7)	57.8 (14.3)	44.9 (7.2)	63.1 (17.3)
Average precipitation inches (mm)	1.1 (28)	1.4 (36)	1.1 (28)	1.3 (33)	2.6 (66)	2.6 (66)	2.7 (69)	2.0 (51)	5.1 (130)	2.5 (64)	1.3 (33)	1.3 (33)	25 (637)
Source: Bestplaces.net

== Education ==
Heidelberg is served by the Mercedes Independent School District.

In addition, South Texas Independent School District operates magnet schools that serve the community.
