= Indian Hills, Texas =

- Census-designated place
- Coordinates: 26°12′50″N 97°55′7″W
- Country: United States of America
- State: Texas
- County: Hidalgo

Area
  - Total: 2.5 sq mi (6.5 km^{2})
  - Land: 2.4 sq mi (6.2 km^{2})
  - Water: 0.12 sq mi (0.3 km^{2})
- Elevation: 66 ft (20 m)

Population (2020)
  - Total: 2,694
  - Density: 1,100/sq mi (430/km^{2})
- Time zone: UTC-6 (Central (CST))
  - Summer (DST): UTC-5 (CDT)
- ZIP code: 78570
- Area code: 956
- FIPS code: 48-35915
- GNIS feature ID: 1852715

Indian Hills is a census-designated place (CDP) in Hidalgo County, Texas, United States. At the 2020 United States Census, the population was 2,694. It is part of the McAllen–Edinburg–Mission Metropolitan Statistical Area.

== Geography ==
Indian Hills is located at 26°12′50″N 97°55′7″W (26.213900, -97.918494).

According to the United States Census Bureau, the CDP has a total area of 2.5 square miles (6.5 km^{2}), of which 2.4 square miles (6.2 km^{2}) is land and 0.1 square miles (0.26 km^{2}) (4.00%) is water.

== Demographics ==
Historical population
Census	Pop.	Note	%±
2000	2,036		—
2010	2,591		27.3%
2020	2,694		4.0%
U.S. Decennial Census; 1850–1900 1910; 1920 1930 1940; 1950 1960 1970; 1980 1990 2000; 2010 2020

Indian Hills first appeared as a census designated place in the 2000 U.S. census.

=== 2020 census ===
Indian Hills CDP, Texas – Racial and ethnic composition Note: the US Census treats Hispanic/Latino as an ethnic category. This table excludes Latinos from the racial categories and assigns them to a separate category. Hispanics/Latinos may be of any race.
Race / Ethnicity (NH = Non-Hispanic)	Pop 2000	Pop 2010	Pop 2020	% 2000	% 2010	% 2020
White alone (NH)	53	78	78	2.60%	3.01%	2.90%
Black or African American alone (NH)	0	7	0	0.00%	0.27%	0.00%
Native American or Alaska Native alone (NH)	0	4	0	0.00%	0.15%	0.00%
Asian alone (NH)	1	0	0	0.05%	0.00%	0.00%
Native Hawaiian or Pacific Islander alone (NH)	0	0	0	0.00%	0.00%	0.00%
Other race alone (NH)	0	0	3	0.00%	0.00%	0.11%
Mixed race or Multiracial (NH)	0	0	2	0.00%	0.00%	0.07%
Hispanic or Latino (any race)	1,982	2,502	2,611	97.35%	96.57%	96.92%
Total	2,036	2,591	2,694	100.00%	100.00%	100.00%

As of the census of 2000, there were 2,036 people, 424 households, and 399 families residing in the CDP. The population density was 850.7 inhabitants per square mile (328.5/km^{2}). There were 567 housing units at an average density of 236.9 per square mile (91.5/km^{2}). The racial makeup of the CDP was 57.47% White, 1.28% Native American, 0.29% Asian, 0.05% Pacific Islander, 40.47% from other races, and 0.44% from two or more races. Hispanic or Latino of any race were 97.35% of the population.

There were 424 households, out of which 73.6% had children under the age of 18 living with them, 76.4% were married couples living together, 12.7% had a female householder with no husband present, and 5.7% were non-families. 5.2% of all households were made up of individuals, and 2.4% had someone living alone who was 65 years of age or older. The average household size was 4.80 and the average family size was 4.97.

In the CDP, the population was spread out, with 47.6% under the age of 18, 11.3% from 18 to 24, 26.5% from 25 to 44, 10.7% from 45 to 64, and 3.9% who were 65 years of age or older. The median age was 19 years. For every 100 females, there were 97.7 males. For every 100 females age 18 and over, there were 92.8 males.

The median income for a household in the CDP was $14,877, and the median income for a family was $14,921. Males had a median income of $12,147 versus $9,485 for females. The per capita income for the CDP was $3,583. About 58.6% of families and 62.3% of the population were below the poverty line, including 68.9% of those under age 18 and 59.8% of those age 65 or over.

== Education ==
Indian Hills is served by the Mercedes Independent School District.

In addition, South Texas Independent School District operates magnet schools that serve the community.
