= National Society =

National Society may refer to:

- Italian National Society
- National Society for Colitis and Crohn's Disease
- National Society of the Colonial Dames of America
- National Society Colonial Dames XVII Century
- National Society of the Dames of the Court of Honor
- National Society Daughters of the American Colonists
- National Society Daughters of the American Revolution
- National Society Daughters of Colonial Wars
- National Society of Daughters of Founders and Patriots of America
- National Society Daughters of the Union 1861-1865
- National Society Descendants of American Farmers
- National Society for Earthquake Technology - Nepal
- National Society for Hispanic Professionals
- National Society for Human Rights
- National Society for Medical Research
- National Society of New England Women
- National Society for Promoting Religious Education
- National Society for Road Safety
- National Society for Women's Suffrage
- National Society for the Gifted and Talented
- National Society for the Prevention of Cruelty to Children
- National Society of Accountants
- National Society of Arts and Letters
- National Society of Black Engineers
- National Society of Black Physicists
- National Society of Blackjacks
- National Society of Brushmakers and General Workers
- National Society of Collegiate Scholars
- National Society of Consulting Soil Scientists
- National Society of Film Critics
- National Society of Genetic Counselors
- National Society of Hispanic Physicists
- National Society of Metal Mechanics
- National Society of Mural Painters
- National Society of Operative Printers and Assistants
- National Society of Professional Engineers
- National Society Southern Dames of America
