= Mercedes High School =

Public school in Texas, United States

Location
- 1200 South Florida Street; Mercedes, Hidalgo County, Texas 78570; United States; 26.137212°N 97.908764°W

Information
- Type: Public school
- School district: Mercedes Independent School District
- Principal: David Aguirre
- Teaching staff: 69.14 (FTE)
- Grades: 9-12
- Enrollment: 895 (2023-2024)
- Student to teacher ratio: 12.94
- Colors: Black; Burnt Orange; White
- Mascot: Tiger
- Yearbook: The Bengal
- Website: mhs.misdtx.net

Mercedes High School is a public high school located in Mercedes, Texas, and is part of the Mercedes Independent School District. The school has about 1000 students.

== History ==
Mercedes High School was originally located at 837 S Ohio St. and a second high school was built directly across the street and used until the present-day campus was built and opened in 1967. The old high school is now part of Mercedes Early College Academy. In 2002 a new complex was added to the southeast part of the school called the Career and Technical Education Unit. In 2010, MHS plans to open new Physics labs located just outside the east and west I-halls and a new P.E. locker room located just north of the gymnasium. Mercedes High School's notable accomplishments include their division I boys soccer team winning their division's region final against Westlake High School in 2007, where they won 2-1. Also, two Tiger Baseball teams have qualified for the State Finals, in 1974 and 1986.

== Sports ==
According to Mercedes High School's Athletic Directory, the school offers the following sports programs:

- Baseball
- Boys' Basketball
- Boys' Cross Country
- Boys' Golf
- Boys' Soccer
- Boys' Track
- Cheerleading
- Dance
- Football
- Girls' Athletics
- Girls' Basketball
- Girls' Cross Country
- Girls' Golf
- Girls' Soccer
- Girls' Tennis
- Girls' Track
- Jr. High Athletics
- Powerlifting
- Softball
- Sports Medicine
- Tennis
- Tiger Beat
- Volleyball

== Notable alumni ==
- Natalia Anciso, Contemporary artist and educator. Class of 2003.
- Amanda McBroom, Singer, song-writer, actress, "The Rose" composer. Class of 1965.
- Billy Gene Pemelton, 1964 Olympic pole vaulter
- Elida Reyna, Tejano singer. Lead singer of Latin Grammy Award winning band Elida Y Avante. Class of 1990.
