= South Texas ISD World Scholars =

Public school in Edinburg, Texas, United States

Location
- 510 S. Sugar Rd. Edinburg, Texas 78539; United States
- 26.298187°N 98.178480°W

Information
- Type: Public High School
- School district: South Texas Independent School District
- Principal: Dr. Cynthia Chairez
- Grades: 9-12
- Website: worldscholars.stisd.net

World Scholars Academy (officially South Texas ISD World Scholars) is a public magnet high school in Edinburg, Texas, United States, serving students in grades 9 through 12 as part of the South Texas Independent School District (STISD). The school offers the International Baccalaureate (IB) Diploma Programme and provides opportunities for dual enrollment and career and technical education. World Scholars Academy draws students from the tri-county area of Cameron, Hidalgo, and Willacy Counties, and operates on an open enrollment basis for residents within the district.

== History ==
The school originated in 1993 as The Teacher Academy of South Texas when South Texas High School in Edinburg was redirected to focus on teacher preparation and career-oriented education. In 2003, the curriculum expanded to include business and technology programs, and the school was renamed South Texas Business, Education & Technology Academy (commonly known as BETA).

From 2003 to 2008, the academy served both middle school and high school students. In 2008, the junior high portion of BETA separated and became South Texas ISD Preparatory Academy (STPA), leaving the high school as a standalone magnet campus.

In 2011, South Texas BETA was ranked 94 in Texas.

On April 17, 2012, South Texas BETA was accredited as an International Baccalaureate School in the Americas.

In 2019, BETA underwent a programmatic reorganization and was renamed South Texas ISD World Scholars to reflect an increased focus on the International Baccalaureate Diploma Programme and advanced academic pathways.
