= Billy Gene Pemelton =

American pole vaulter

William Eugene Pemelton (born September 5, 1941, in Mercedes, Texas) is a retired American track and field athlete. He represented the United States in the pole vault at the 1964 Olympics where he finished in eighth place. He qualified by finishing third at the United States Olympic Trials. He vaulted collegiately for Abilene Christian University. Prior to that he went to Mercedes High School, winning the Texas State Championship in the 180 yard low hurdles. After the Olympics, he was the National Indoor Pole Vault Champion in 1965.
