= Mercedes Independent School District =

School district in Texas, United States

Address
- 206 West 6th Street Mercedes, TX, USA ESC Region 1
- Coordinates: 26°9′13″N 97°55′13″W

District information
- Motto: All in. Every day.
- Grades: PK-12
- Established: 1908; 118 years ago
- Superintendent: Dr. Alicia Noyola
- Governing agency: Texas Education Agency
- Schools: 8
- NCES District ID: 4830250

Students and staff
- Students: 3,941 (2025-2026)
- Athletic conference: UIL Class AAAA
- District mascot: Tigers
- Colors: Black Orange White

Other information
- Website: www.misdtx.net

Mercedes Independent School District is a public school district based in Mercedes, Texas, United States.

Covering approximately 46 square miles in Hidalgo County, the district serves the City of Mercedes and the unincorporated communities of Heidelberg, Indian Hills, and Relampago.

As of 2026, Mercedes ISD operates 7 campuses, including 1 high school, 1 middle school, 3 elementary schools, and 2 alternative high school academies. The district most recently received a "C" rating from the Texas Education Agency (TEA).

== History ==
As of 1984, Mercedes ISD operated 7 campuses, including Mercedes High School (grades 9-12), Mercedes Junior High School (7-8), and the following elemtary schools: Leon R. Graham (6), Zachary Taylor (5), William B. Travis (3-4), John F. Kennedy (1-2), and West (K). Pre-kindergarten (PK) was added to West ES in 1986.

1994 saw the addition of a Student Alternative Program for grades 9-12, which expanded to 7-12 in 1996. Hidalgo County Youth Village opened in 1997, a Juvenile Justice Alternative Education Program (JJAEP) for grades 6-12. In 1998, the Student Alternative Program became the Mercedes Alternative Academy and expanded to add 6th grade students. It added grades 4-5 in 1999.

MISD underwent a massive grade reconfiguration with the closing of West ES in 2000. Graham ES began housing 5th grade in addition to 6th, Taylor ES moved to a 1-4 setup, Kennedy ES housed K-4, and Travis ES had PK-4. The Mercedes Discipline Alternative Education Program (DAEP) also opened to grades 5-12 in 2000.

In 2001, PK and K were removed from Kennedy ES and Travis ES and placed in the new Mercedes Early Childhood Center. This was followed by the opening of Ruben Hinojosa Elementary School (1-4) in 2002 as Kennedy ES closed. Kennedy reopened in 2004 with grades 5-6, replacing Graham ES. North Elementary School opened in 2009, all elementary campuses moved to a 1-5 configuration, and Kennedy became a 6th grade center. Additionally, the former Graham campus was reopened as Mercedes Early College Academy, serving grades 9-12.

2015 saw a few changes. The Kennedy campus became Sgt. William G.Harrell Middle School (initially serving 6-7 before adding 8th grade the following year) and Mercedes JH became Sgt. Manuel Chacon Middle School (6-8). The North ES campus was renamed after John F. Kennedy.

The Mercedes Early Childhood Center closed in 2016 and the elementary schools became PK-5 campuses. This campus returned to service in 2018 as the Mercedes Early Literacy Program, a PK and early learning program - this did not affect the elementary grade configuration.

In 2025, Kennedy ES and Taylor ES were closed due to budget cuts and Harrell transitioned from a middle school to elementary campus. Kennedy now serves as the administration building.

== Schools ==
=== Current schools ===
Name	Grades	Established	Additional information
Mercedes High School	9-12	1912	
Mercedes Early College Academy	9-12	2009	Locally known as MECA
Mercedes Academic Academy	9-12	1994	Alternative education
Sgt. Manuel Chacon Middle School	6-8	unknown	renamed
Sgt. William G.Harrell Elementary School	PK-5	2004	Former middle school
Ruben Hinojosa Elementary School	PK-5	2002	
William B. Travis Elementary School	PK-5	unknown	

=== Former schools ===
Name	Opened	Closed	Additional information
John F. Kennedy Elementary School	2009	2025	
Zachary Taylor Elementary School		2025	
West Elementary School			
