= Relampago, Texas =

- Census-designated place
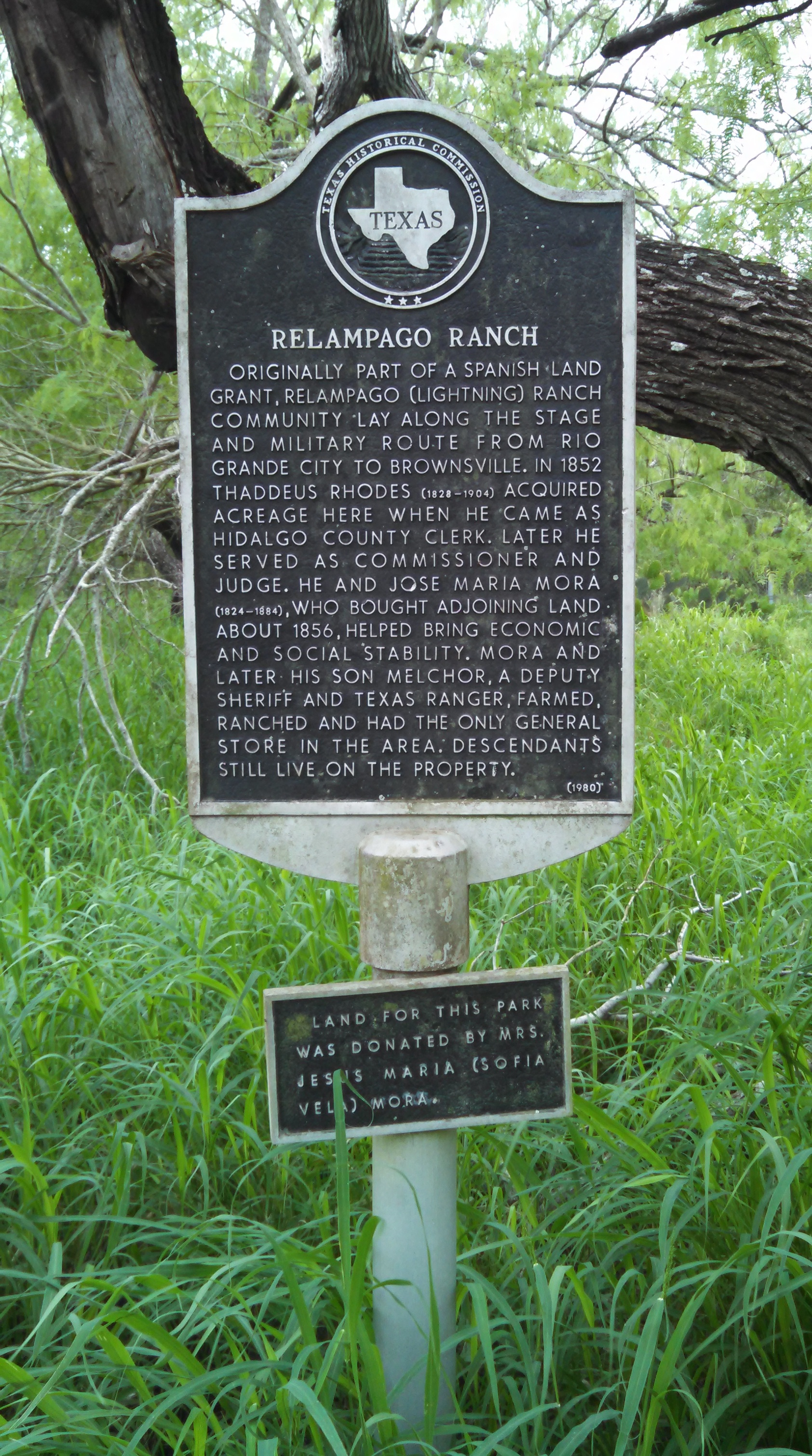
- Texas State Historical Marker for 19th century Relampago Ranch.

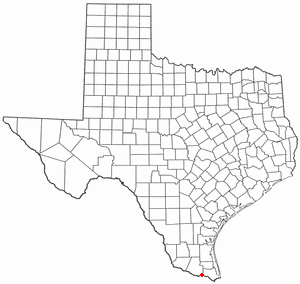
- Location of Relampago, Texas

- Coordinates: 26°5′16″N 97°54′17″W
- Country: United States of America
- State: Texas
- County: Hidalgo

Area
  - Total: 1.3 sq mi (3.4 km^{2})
  - Land: 1.3 sq mi (3.4 km^{2})
  - Water: 0 sq mi (0.0 km^{2})
- Elevation: 69 ft (21 m)

Population (2020)
  - Total: 129
  - Density: 98/sq mi (38/km^{2})
- Time zone: UTC-6 (Central (CST))
  - Summer (DST): UTC-5 (CDT)
- ZIP code: 78570
- Area code: 956
- FIPS code: 48-61532
- GNIS feature ID: 1345031

Relampago is a census-designated place (CDP) in Hidalgo County, Texas, United States. The population was 129 at the 2020 United States Census. It is part of the McAllen–Edinburg–Mission Metropolitan Statistical Area.

The town was named for the Relampago Ranch, a rancho started in 1856 by José María Mora and Thaddeus Rhodes. Relámpago is Spanish and Portuguese for "lightning flash." The town for some years has been a first stop on the so-called ferrocarril subterráneo for migrants.

== Demographics ==
Historical population
Census	Pop.	Note	%±
2000	104		—
2010	132		26.9%
2020	129		−2.3%
U.S. Decennial Census; 1850–1900 1910; 1920 1930 1940; 1950 1960 1970; 1980 1990 2000; 2010 2020

Relampago first appeared as a census designated place in the 2000 U.S. census.

=== 2020 census ===
Relampago CDP, Texas – Racial and ethnic composition Note: the US Census treats Hispanic/Latino as an ethnic category. This table excludes Latinos from the racial categories and assigns them to a separate category. Hispanics/Latinos may be of any race.
Race / Ethnicity (NH = Non-Hispanic)	Pop 2000	Pop 2010	Pop 2020	% 2000	% 2010	% 2020
White alone (NH)	4	7	4	3.85%	5.30%	3.10%
Black or African American alone (NH)	0	0	0	0.00%	0.00%	0.00%
Native American or Alaska Native alone (NH)	0	0	0	0.00%	0.00%	0.00%
Asian alone (NH)	0	0	1	0.00%	0.00%	0.78%
Native Hawaiian or Pacific Islander alone (NH)	0	0	0	0.00%	0.00%	0.00%
Other race alone (NH)	0	0	0	0.00%	0.00%	0.00%
Mixed race or Multiracial (NH)	0	0	0	0.00%	0.00%	0.00%
Hispanic or Latino (any race)	100	125	124	96.15%	94.70%	96.12%
Total	104	132	129	100.00%	100.00%	100.00%

As of the census of 2000, there were 104 people, 36 households, and 29 families residing in the CDP. The population density was 80.2 inhabitants per square mile (31.0/km^{2}). There were 44 housing units at an average density of 33.9 per square mile (13.1/km^{2}). The racial makeup of the CDP was 93.27% White, 6.73% from other races. Hispanic or Latino of any race were 96.15% of the population.

There were 36 households, out of which 38.9% had children under the age of 18 living with them, 52.8% were married couples living together, 27.8% had a female householder with no husband present, and 19.4% were non-families. 16.7% of all households were made up of individuals, and 16.7% had someone living alone who was 65 years of age or older. The average household size was 2.89 and the average family size was 3.28.

In the CDP, the population was spread out, with 23.1% under the age of 18, 7.7% from 18 to 24, 29.8% from 25 to 44, 23.1% from 45 to 64, and 16.3% who were 65 years of age or older. The median age was 41 years. For every 100 females, there were 85.7 males. For every 100 females age 18 and over, there were 66.7 males.

The median income for a household in the CDP was $17,250, and the median income for a family was $62,891. Males had a median income of $0 versus $28,182 for females. The per capita income for the CDP was $9,207. There were 18.5% of families and 38.3% of the population living below the poverty line, including 51.7% of under eighteens and 66.7% of those over 64.

== Education ==
Relampago is served by the Mercedes Independent School District.

In addition, South Texas Independent School District operates magnet schools that serve the community.
