= South Texas Academy for Medical Professions =

South Texas ISD Medical Professions

Location
- 10650 North Expressway 77/83; San Benito, Texas 78575; United States
- Coordinates: 26.049433°N 97.553773°W

Information
- School type: Public high school
- School district: South Texas Independent School District
- Principal: Jose Lucio
- Teaching staff: 56.64 (FTE)
- Grades: 9-12
- Enrollment: 817 (2017-18)
- Student to teacher ratio: 14.42
- Colors: light blue, blue, white
- Mascot: Angel
- Website: medicalprofessions.stisd.net

South Texas ISD Medical Professions, also known as Medical Academy, is a high school in Olmito,Texas, Texas, United States.

The school was opened in 2003 as South Texas Academy of Medical Technology in San Benito and changed its name in 2012 to South Texas Academy for Medical Professions (Medical Academy). The school relocated to Olmito, Texas to its bigger campus which opened in 2015. The school serves as an alternative to larger high schools of local independent school districts for students interested in pursuing careers in health care. South Texas ISD Medical Professions is part of the South Texas Independent School District. It has notable partnerships with Baylor College of Medicine, Harlingen Medical Center, Regional Academic Health Center, Texas State Technical College, Valley Baptist Medical Center and University of Texas at Brownsville and UTRGV.
