= The Science Academy of South Texas =

Public school in Texas, United States

South Texas ISD Science Academy
- Vitruvian Man

Location
- 900 Med High Drive; Mercedes, Texas 78570; United States; 26.157108°N 97.939356°W

Information
- Type: Public high school
- Motto: Keep Scitech weird!
- Established: 1989
- School district: South Texas Independent School District
- Principal: Eric Gutierrez
- Faculty: 65.12 (on FTE basis)
- Grades: 9-12
- Enrollment: 840 (as of 2024-25)
- Student to teacher ratio: 13:1
- Website: scienceacademy.stisd.net

South Texas ISD Science Academy (formerly known as Science Academy of South Texas), also known as "SciTech", is a high school in Mercedes, Texas, United States, as part of the South Texas Independent School District. This campus is ranked among the top 1% Best Public High Schools in America.

The school serves as an alternative to high schools of local independent school districts for students interested in pursuing careers in science, technology, and engineering. The school's unique curriculum has given it national recognition. Being a public magnet school, open enrollment has been the school's policy since its creation, although application is required. The Science Academy is part of the South Texas Independent School District which is ranked #7 out of 10,932 school districts in the United States.

The South Texas ISD Science Academy has partnerships with Cornell University, Stanford University, Rice University, Rochester Institute of Technology, University of Texas-Pan American and South Texas College. Its sister school South Texas ISD Health Professions, commonly known as "Med High", resides on the same campus. Both schools are served by Biblioteca Las Américas, the campus library.

A study called The Science Academy a "dropout factory," citing a 55% retention rate.

As of the 2018-19 school year, the school had an enrollment of 764 students and 54.42 classroom teachers (on a FTE basis), for a student-teacher ratio of 13:1.

== History ==
Logo used in South Texas ISD advertising, ?-2019

The school was founded in 1989 as the Math and Science Academy. Jorge Lopez, the principal of neighboring Med High served as principal. After a year, the school's name was changed to The Science Academy of South Texas. In 1992, the main building was completed and classes moved out of the portables.

In 2018, construction of The Science Academy's Congressman Rubén Hinojosa Innovation Lab was completed. A supporting beam signed by the Class of 2018 can be seen near the building's mezzanine.

A detailed history of The Science Academy can be found in Dr. Anna Rudolph Canter's dissertation entitled In the Middle of an Orange Grove, Across the Street From the Tortilla Factory: The Science Academy of South Texas.

== Awards and recognition ==
During the 2005-06 school year, The South Texas ISD Science Academy was recognized with the Blue Ribbon School Award of Excellence by the United States Department of Education, the highest award an American school can receive.

In 2003, it was placed 8th on Newsweek magazine's listing of "America's Best High Schools".

In 2007, U.S. News & World Report ranked The Science Academy 23rd on its list of America's Best High Schools. SciTech's sister schools South Texas Business, Education & Technology Academy, or BETA (currently known as South Texas ISD World Scholars), and South Texas High School for Health Professions, or Med High (currently known as South Texas ISD Health Professions), were ranked 54th and 64th respectively.

In 2010, The Science Academy was ranked number twelve on Newsweek's ranking of the best high schools in the nation. It was also ranked third among other Texas high schools.

In 2011, The Science Academy was ranked number twenty six on The Washington Review.

In the 2012 issue of the U.S. News & World Report, The Science Academy ranked at number 48. Med High and BETA ranked at 104th and 245th respectively. SciTech's Advanced Placement (AP) exam passing rate was at 44%. BETA had a passing rate of 15%, and Med High had a passing rate of 27%.

In the 2014 issue of the U.S. News & World Report, The Science Academy ranked at number 38 in the nation.

In 2018, it was placed at 13th for Best Public High Schools in Texas and 1st in the Rio Grande Valley.

In 2019, The Science Academy received the PLTW Distinguished High School award. Only 9 out of 1,624 schools in Texas received this prestigious award.

In 2026, Science Academy of south Texas ISD was recognized by Apple by being recognized as an Apple Distinguished School for 2026-2029 for inspiring, imagining, and impacting teaching and learning schoolwide through continuous innovation.

== Extracurricular activities ==
SciTech has numerous extracurricular organizations including but not limited to:

- Physics Club
- Spanish Club
- Astronomy Club
- National Honor Society (NHS)
- Student Council
- Science National Honor Society (SNHS)
- Mu Alpha Theta
- PE Club (includes Running Club)
- University Interscholastic League (UIL)
- Technology Student Association (TSA)
- Robotics Club
- Rubik's Cube Club
- Culinary Arts and Crafts Club
- Environmental Science Club
- PALS (Peer Assistance and Learning Club)
- Students Against Destructive Decisions (SADD)
- Pan American Student Forum (PASF)
- Poetry Club
- Music Club
- Drama Club
- CinTech
- Stock Market Club
- Order of the Phoenix Club
- Chess Club

== See also ==
- Magnet school
