= National Society for the Gifted and Talented =

The National Society for the Gifted and Talented (NSGT) is a Stamford, Connecticut based not-for-profit 501(c)(3) organization created to honor and encourage gifted and talented (G&T) children and youth. It is committed to acknowledging and supporting the needs of these children and youth by providing recognition of their significant academic and artistic accomplishments and access to educational resources and advanced learning opportunities directly related to their interests and talent areas.

The goal of the NSGT is to provide a structure where gifted and talented children and youth are identified, and as members, can expect to find information and opportunities that directly relate to, and cultivate, their abilities and desires to achieve at a high level.

NSGT collaborates closely with other gifted and talented program providers, school districts, colleges and universities, community programs, and corporations.

== Board of trustees ==
- Chair: Arie L. Nettles, Ph.D., NCSP, HSP - Associate Professor of Clinical Pediatrics, Center for Child Development, Vanderbilt University
- Vice Chair: Judith Parker, Ph.D. - Executive Director, Carmel Hill Fund Education Program
- Executive Director: Barbara Swicord Ed.D. - President and CEO, Summer Institute for the Gifted
- Treasurer: Jack Burg - Chief Financial Officer, American Institute For Foreign Study
- Benjamin Davenport - Principal, Eastern Middle School (retired), Riverside, CT
- Rachael Dubin (Alumna, SIG) Product Manager, IBM - Doctoral Student, Drexel University College of Computing and Informatics
- Julia To Dutka, Ed.D. - Strategist, Commission on Graduates of Foreign Nursing Schools
- William L. Gertz - President and CEO, American Institute For Foreign Study
- Matthew Greene. Ph.D. - Educational Director, Howard Greene and Associates
- Felice Kaufmann, Ph.D. - Educational Consultant
- Joseph Renzulli, Ed.D. - Director, National Research Center for the Gifted and Talented, University of Connecticut
- Leonard M. Robinson - Executive Director, New Jersey YMHA-YWHA Camps
- Sir Cyril Taylor, GBE - Chairman, American Institute For Foreign Study
- Abby Weisberg - Summer Institute for the Gifted Parent
