= Mercedes, Texas =

- City
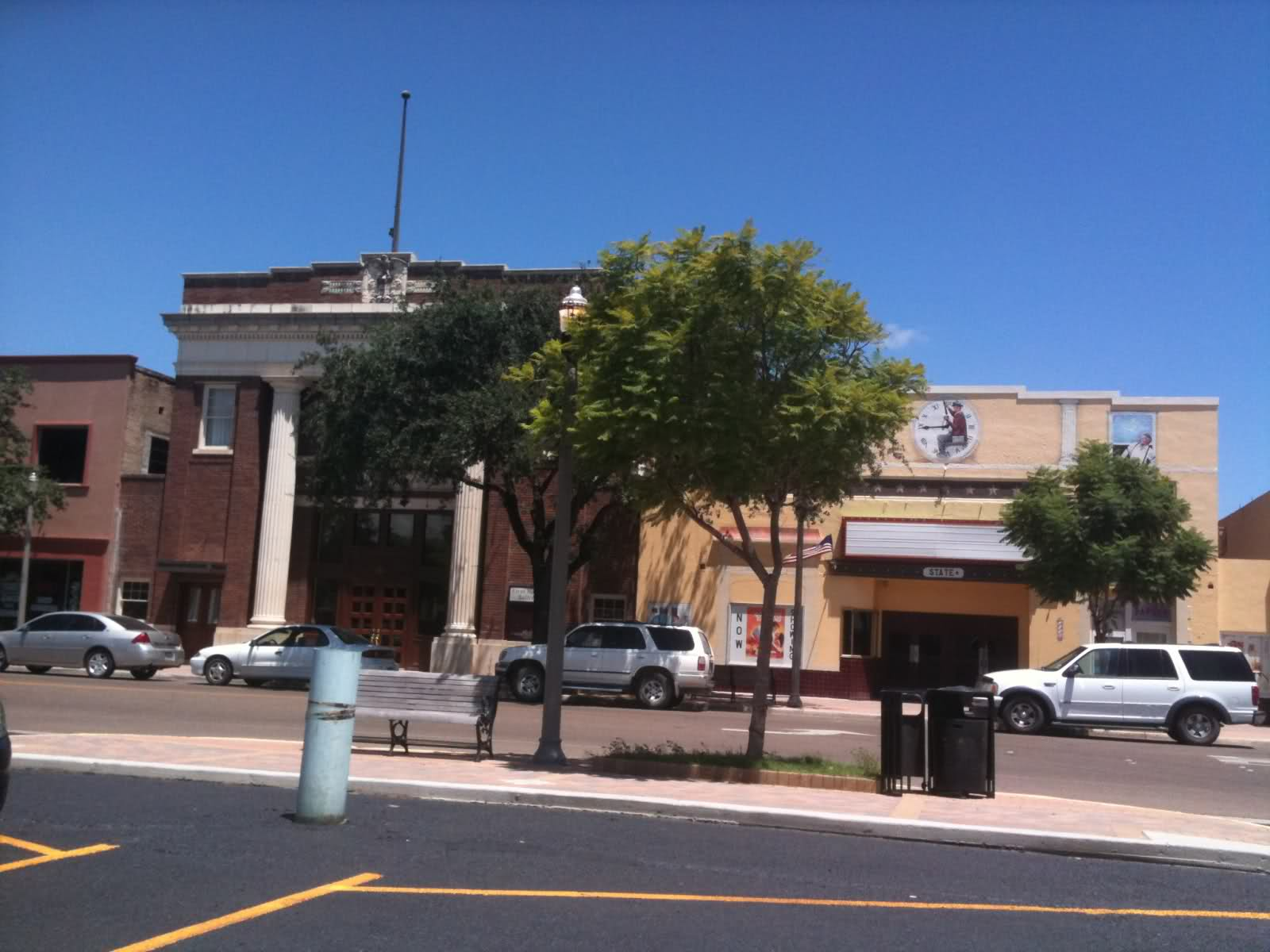
- Downtown Mercedes in August 2010
- Nickname: The Queen City
- Motto: "It Starts Here!"
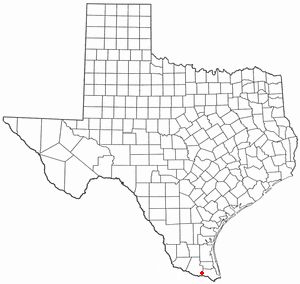
- Location of Mercedes, Texas

- Coordinates: 26°8′58″N 97°55′7″W
- Country: United States
- State: Texas
- County: Hidalgo

Area
  - Total: 11.86 sq mi (30.72 km^{2})
  - Land: 11.80 sq mi (30.56 km^{2})
  - Water: 0.066 sq mi (0.17 km^{2})
- Elevation: 69 ft (21 m)

Population (2020)
  - Total: 16,258
  - Density: 1,407.2/sq mi (543.34/km^{2})
- Time zone: UTC-6 (Central (CST))
  - Summer (DST): UTC-5 (CDT)
- ZIP code: 78570
- Area code: 956
- FIPS code: 48-47700
- GNIS feature ID: 1341366
- Website: cityofmercedes.com

Mercedes is a U.S. city in Hidalgo County, Texas. As of the 2020 census, Mercedes had a population of 16,258. It is part of the McAllen–Edinburg–Mission and Reynosa–McAllen metropolitan areas.

== Geography ==
Mercedes is located in southeastern Hidalgo County at 26°8′58″N 97°55′7″W (26.149315, –97.918675). It is bordered to the west by Weslaco and to the east, in Cameron County, by La Feria.

The Interstate 2/U.S. Route 83 freeway passes through the northern side of Mercedes, leading west 21 miles (34 km) to McAllen and east 14 miles (23 km) to Harlingen. Mercedes is 9 miles (14 km) north of the Progreso–Nuevo Progreso International Bridge over the Rio Grande, connecting Texas with the Mexican state of Tamaulipas.

According to the United States Census Bureau, Mercedes has a total area of 11.5 square miles (29.8 km^{2}), of which 11.4 square miles (29.6 km^{2}) are land and 0.1 square miles (0.2 km^{2}), or 0.55%, are water.

== History ==
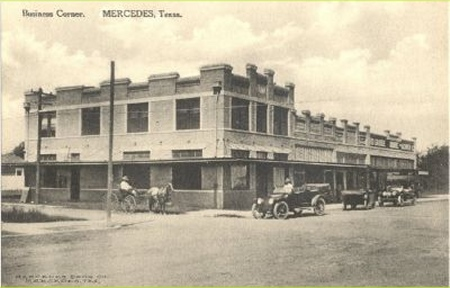
Downtown Mercedes in 1915

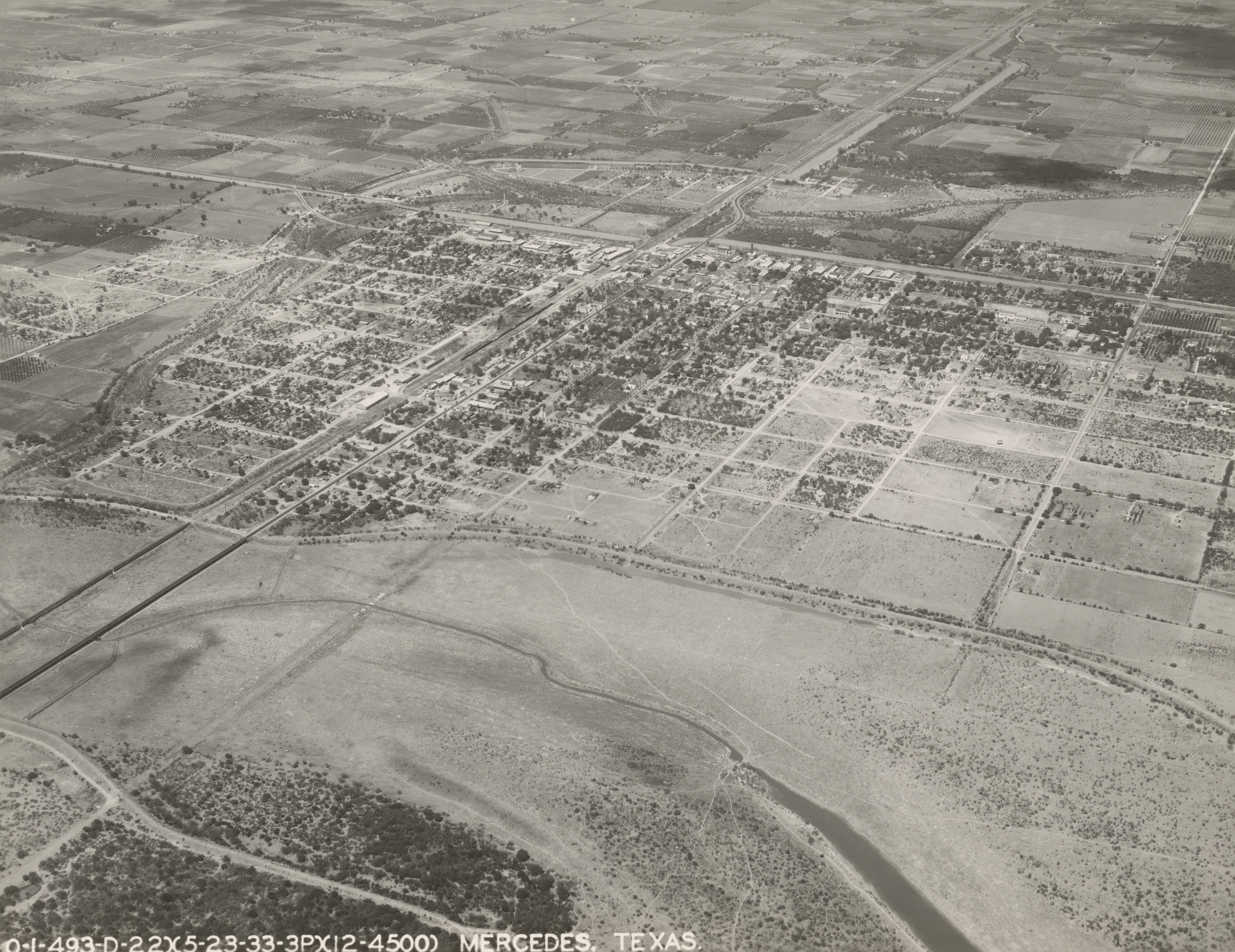
Mercedes in 1933

Mercedes is known as "The Queen City of the Valley" or "La Reina del Valle". Mercedes was founded September 15, 1907, by the American Rio Grande Land & Irrigation Company, and was incorporated March 8, 1909. It is one of the oldest towns in the Rio Grande Valley, and the city celebrated its centennial in 2007.

The city was located in Capisallo Pasture, part of Capisallo Ranch owned by Jim Welles. This location was known as the Pear Orchard because of the vast numbers of prickly pear cactus growing there at that time.

The origin of the city name - Mercedes - is not clear. A common claim is that the first name given to the city was "Diaz" in honor of Porfirio Diaz, then president of Mexico. Later it was supposedly renamed "Mercedes Diaz" in honor of the president's wife, and from that, Mercedes became the Queen City. This story, however, is historically inaccurate, given that neither of Diaz's two wives were named Mercedes.

During President Woodrow Wilson's administration, Camp Llano Grande was founded in 1916 southwest of Mercedes. Today, its location is in Weslaco, Texas, a town that didn't exist in 1916 and Mercedes was the nearest town. The National Defense Act called for the establishment of several National Guard camps, including Camp Llano Grande, to counter cross-border attacks led by Pancho Villa. Soldiers from Indiana, Minnesota and North Dakota were stationed at the camp from 1916 - 1917. Upon the onset or World War I, the camp merged with Camp Mercedes to train soldiers for service in France.

General John J. Pershing chose Mercedes as the site for a permanent training camp when the United States entered WW1 in 1916. Construction of Camp Mercedes on an 80-acre tract southeast of town was completed in early 1917. Until the WWI recruits arrived, a 16th Cavalry training cadre occupied the camp. The soldiers who later arrived for WWI training specialized in the management of horses for service in France. At its peak, Camp Mercedes hosted 16 officers, 700 enlisted men and 600 horses. After the armistice, the camp was demobilized and closed in 1922.

The old Toluca Ranch still stands east of the International Bridge at Progreso, the sister city to the south. This ranch was close to the river and a prized target for the bandidos during the days of Pancho Villa. It was built with many secret rooms and passages, and had heavy wooden shutters on the windows to protect its residents.

== Demographics ==
Historical population
Census	Pop.	Note	%±
1910	1,209		—
1920	3,414		182.4%
1930	6,608		93.6%
1940	7,624		15.4%
1950	10,081		32.2%
1960	10,943		8.6%
1970	9,355		−14.5%
1980	11,851		26.7%
1990	12,694		7.1%
2000	13,649		7.5%
2010	15,570		14.1%
2020	16,258		4.4%
U.S. Decennial Census

=== 2020 census ===
As of the 2020 census, Mercedes had a population of 16,258 people living in 5,081 households and 3,726 families. Of those households, 43.3% had children under the age of 18 living in them, 43.9% were married-couple households, 15.1% were households with a male householder and no spouse or partner present, and 34.7% were households with a female householder and no spouse or partner present. About 20.6% of all households were made up of individuals and 11.6% had someone living alone who was 65 years of age or older.

The median age was 32.7 years, with 30.8% of residents under the age of 18 and 16.3% 65 years of age or older. For every 100 females there were 90.2 males and for every 100 females age 18 and over there were 84.9 males.

There were 6,098 housing units, of which 16.7% were vacant; the homeowner vacancy rate was 2.3% and the rental vacancy rate was 10.4%.

98.4% of residents lived in urban areas while 1.6% lived in rural areas.

Racial composition as of the 2020 census
Race	Number	Percent
White	7,583	46.6%
Black or African American	72	0.4%
American Indian and Alaska Native	120	0.7%
Asian	29	0.2%
Native Hawaiian and Other Pacific Islander	12	0.1%
Some other race	3,161	19.4%
Two or more races	5,281	32.5%
Hispanic or Latino (of any race)	14,948	91.9%

=== 2000 census ===
At the 2000 census, there were 13,649 people, 4,170 households and 3,348 families residing in the city. The population density was 1,591.2 inhabitants per square mile (614.4/km^{2}). There were 5,455 housing units at an average density of 636.0 per square mile (245.6/km^{2}). The racial makeup of the city was 79.42% White, 0.36% African American, 0.89% Native American, 0.07% Asian, 0.01% Pacific Islander, 16.95% from other races, and 2.31% from two or more races. Hispanic or Latino of any race were 90.01% of the population.

There were 4,170 households, of which 41.1% had children under the age of 18 living with them, 54.7% were married couples living together, 21.4% had a female householder with no husband present, and 19.7% were non-families. 18.0% of all households were made up of individuals, and 11.4% had someone living alone who was 65 years of age or older. The average household size was 3.27 and the average family size was 3.75.

32.9% of the population were under the age of 18, 11.5% from 18 to 24, 22.8% from 25 to 44, 18.4% from 45 to 64, and 14.4% who were 65 years of age or older. The median age was 29 years. For every 100 females, there were 88.6 males. For every 100 females age 18 and over, there were 82.3 males.

The median household income was $23,064 and the median family income was $25,339. Males had a median income of $19,945 versus $18,387 for females. The per capita income for the city was $8,658. About 30.4% of families and 36.4% of the population were below the poverty line, including 49.4% of those under age 18 and 30.3% of those age 65 or over.

== Shopping ==
The Rio Grande Valley Premium Outlets, owned by Chelsea Property Group which is a brand of Simon Property Group, opened in November 2006. The city is roughly the geographical center of the Rio Grande Valley urban agglomeration and is located on Interstate 2/U.S. Highway 83, which connects the major urban centers of McAllen, Brownsville and Harlingen. The city is located near a major Mexico–United States border crossing making it accessible to the growing middle class population of Nuevo León and Tamaulipas.

== Government and infrastructure ==
The United States Postal Service operates the Mercedes Post Office.

Mercedes incorporated in 1909 and formed a City Council style government. The first city election installed six council members: John Puckett, Gouverneur K Watson, Mayor William Lingenbrink, Dr. Edward Schoonmaker, Fred Cutting, and Lyle Harrison.

Current elected city officials (2023):

- Oscar Montoya, Mayor
- Jacob Howell, Commissioner Place 1
- Armando Garcia, Commissioner Place 2
- Joe Martinez, Commissioner Place 3
- Ruben Saldana, Commissioner Place 4
- Alberto Perez, City Manager

Police department

- Pedro Estrada, Chief of Police

== Education ==
Mercedes is divided between two school districts: eastern Mercedes is in the Mercedes Independent School District, zoned to Mercedes High School, while western Mercedes is in the Weslaco Independent School District, zoned to Weslaco East High School

In addition, South Texas Independent School District, which is headquartered in Mercedes, serves magnet students in many Rio Grande Valley communities, including Mercedes.

The Science Academy of South Texas and South Texas High School for Health Professions, schools of STISD, are in Mercedes.

In 2015, the city joined other cities in south Texas in support of the newly formed University of Texas Rio Grande Valley by adopting a resolution declaring August 31 as UTRGV day. Also, they recognized the university by installing a boot with the university logos right across the municipal city hall.

Colegio Jacinto Treviño located in Mercedes, Texas, was a pioneering Chicano institution of higher education founded in 1970. It played a critical role in the Mexican-American civil rights movement, focusing on bilingual and bicultural education for underserved communities. Established in response to the limited access Mexican-Americans had to higher education and to challenge mainstream educational systems, the college became an emblem of Chicano self-determination and empowerment. The college was founded during the height of the Chicano Movement, a period in which Mexican-Americans were organizing for civil rights, labor rights, and educational equity. Named after Jacinto Treviño, a Mexican-American revolutionary and educator, the institution was conceived as a space where Chicano students could receive an education relevant to their cultural identity, history, and the socioeconomic challenges faced by their communities. It was created by activists and educators who sought to decolonize education, asserting that traditional institutions failed to reflect the realities and needs of Mexican-American students.

=== Public libraries ===
Dr Hector P Garcia Library serves Mercedes.

== Public arts ==
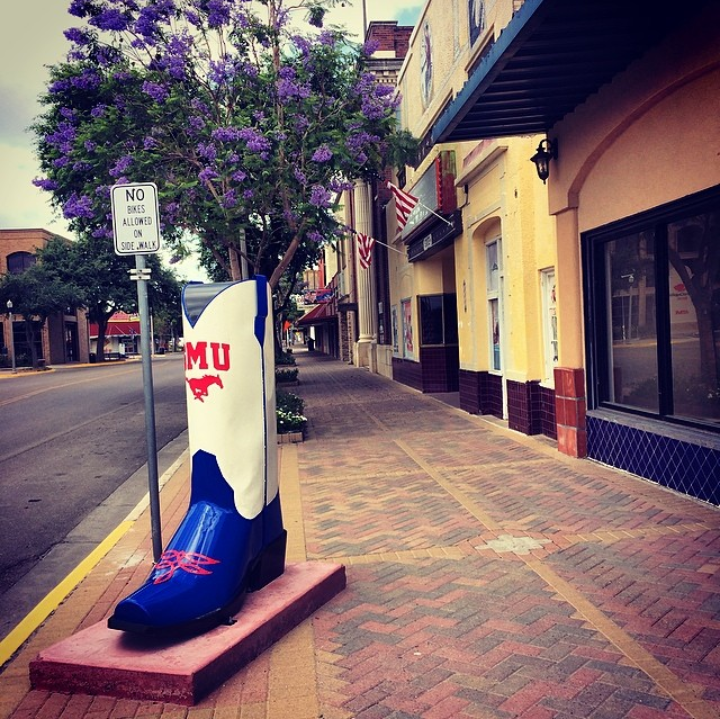
One of many cowboy boots displayed throughout Mercedes

Mercedes is home to a public art project: there are 30 handcrafted 5 1/2-foot-tall (1.7 m) cowboy boots dispersed throughout the city, each painted with the insignia of different colleges from around the state, country and even Mexico.

== Radio stations ==
These FM radio stations broadcast from Mercedes:

- KFRQ 94.5
- KKPS 99.5
- KTEX 100.3
- KNVO 101.1
- KJAV 104.9
- KHKZ 106.3
- KVLY 107.9

== Notable people ==
- Rolando Hinojosa-Smith, author and professor of English
- Billy Gene Pemelton, Olympic pole vaulter (1964)
- Elida Reyna, Tejano musician
- Jeff Wentworth, state senator
- Nancy Nash, born Maude Miller, movie actress
- Amanda McBroom, Singer Songwriter, 2007 Golden Globe Award for Best Original Song "The Rose"
- Jack Morava, mathematician

== Climate ==
The climate in this area is characterized by hot, humid summers and generally mild to cool winters. According to the Köppen Climate Classification system, Mercedes has a humid subtropical climate, abbreviated "Cfa" on climate maps.
