= South Texas High School for Health Professions =

Public school in Texas, United States

South Texas ISD Health Professions

Location
- 700 Med High Dr. Mercedes, Texas; United States; 26.1557°N 97.94°W

Information
- Type: Public high school
- Established: 1984
- School district: South Texas Independent School District
- Principal: Michele Guajardo, Ph.D.
- Faculty: 58.40 (on FTE basis)
- Grades: 9-12
- Enrollment: 791 (2017-18)
- Student to teacher ratio: 13.54
- Mascot: Caduceus
- Website: healthprofessions.stisd.net

South Texas ISD Health Professions (Health Professions) is one of four STISD magnet high schools in the Rio Grande Valley and is located in Mercedes, Texas. Students at Health Professions develop clinical skills in area hospitals, nursing homes and pharmacies, as well as doctor, dentist and veterinary offices. Many students earn certifications as certified nursing assistants, dental assistants, emergency medical technicians, personal trainers and veterinary assistants.

== Awards and recognition ==
In 2006, it was placed 91st on Newsweek's Top 100 High Schools list. In 2007, it rose in the standings to 21st school in Newsweek's Top 100 High Schools list.

In its November 30, 2007 issue, U.S. News & World Report ranked Med High at number 64 on its list of America's Best High Schools. Med High's sister schools Science Academy of South Texas (SciTech) came in at 23rd place, and South Texas Business Education & Technology Academy (BETA) was ranked 54th.

In the 2012 issue of the U.S. News & World Report, Med High ranked at number 104. Its sister schools BETA and Sci Tech ranked 245th and 48th, respectively.

South Texas High School for Health Professions was given the prestigious Blue Ribbon Award in 2010. In the 2013 edition of "America's Best High Schools" by Newsweek, Med High ranked at 257. Its sister schools were also ranked in the list: Science Academy of South Texas (94th), BETA (592nd), and Med Tech (1080th).

== See also ==
- Magnet school
