= South Texas Independent School District =

School district in Texas, United States

Location
- 7001 E. Expressway 83; Mercedes, Texas 78570 ESC Region 1 United States

District information
- Type: Public School District
- Motto: Always Innovating
- Grades: 6-12
- Established: 1964
- Superintendent: Marco Antonio Lara Jr., Ed.D.
- Schools: 7 (6 in-person, 1 virtual)
- NCES District ID: 4837150

Students and staff
- Students: 4,251 (as of 2021-22)
- Teachers: 311 (as of 2021-22)

Other information
- Website: www.stisd.net

South Texas Independent School District (STISD) is a magnet school district headquartered in Mercedes, Texas (USA). STISD operates magnet schools that draw students from three counties: Cameron, Hidalgo and Willacy. STISD covers an area of 3,643 square miles (9,440 km^{2}), overlapping 28 other school districts.

The only all-magnet school district in the state, STISD offers students an educational alternative. STISD schools provide hands-on training in various professional career fields.

Because it is a magnet school district, there is no cost for students to attend, and school bus transportation is also free of charge. STISD schools maintain an open enrollment policy, meaning any student can attend so long as they reside within the tri-county area.

All schools are accredited by the Texas Education Agency and Southern Association of Colleges and Schools. Over 95 percent of STISD graduates continue their education at major universities or technical colleges.

== History ==
The district was created in 1964 by the Texas legislature to provide education to disabled youth who were then excluded from public education. It was known as Rio Grande Rehabilitation District until 1973 and renamed South Texas Independent School District (STISD) in 1974.

STISD started as a residential school in Edinburg, named South Texas High School. To better accommodate the students of the lower Rio Grande Valley, STISD opened another school by the same name in Harlingen in 1967. In 1982, STISD moved the Harlingen school to a new campus in San Benito.

Lawmakers extended STISD’s purpose in 1983 to encourage the operation of vocational magnet schools. Soon after, South Texas High School for Health Professions (Med High) opened in Mercedes in 1984. It was followed by The Science Academy of South Texas (Sci Tech), also in Mercedes, in 1989.

In 1993, South Texas High School in Edinburg was redirected and reopened as The Teacher Academy of South Texas (Teacher Academy).

In 2003, Teacher Academy added business and technology programs and the school was renamed South Texas Business, Education & Technology Academy (BETA). That same year, South Texas High School in San Benito was redirected and reopened as South Texas Academy of Medical Technology (Med Tech).

In 2008, the junior high from BETA separated and opened as South Texas Preparatory Academy (STPA).

In 2012, South Texas Academy of Medical Technology (Med Tech) was renamed South Texas Academy for Medical Professions (Medical Academy).

In 2015, a second junior high school was opened as Rising Scholars Academy of South Texas (Rising Scholars) on the San Benito campus. That same year, Medical Academy was moved to a new campus in Brownsville.

In 2019, BETA increased its focus on its International Baccalaureate (IB) Diploma Programme and concurrent enrollment programs and was renamed South Texas ISD World Scholars (World Scholars).

In 2021, the district will open South Texas ISD Virtual Academy, a standalone school where students will take courses 100 percent virtually. In its first year, the school will serve students in grades 6-9 but will eventually serve students in grades 6-12.

Preparatory Academy and Rising Scholars Academy will expand its programs and begin serving sixth-grade students for the 2022-2023 school year.

Though the district’s mission has evolved since 1964, STISD continues to provide educational and occupational training to students with special needs through the Half-Day Career & Technology Program offered at STISD high schools.

== Student body ==
For the 2014-2015 school year, the district reported a total enrollment of 3,394.

Demographics	2021-22	2015-16	2010-11	2005-06
African-American	1.0%	1.0%	1.2%	1.1%
Hispanic	81.0%	82.9%	81.6%	78.3%
White	9.6%	5.2%	7.5%	12.9%
American Indian	0.2%	0.0%	0.3%	—
Asian	7.5%	9.9%	8.8%	7.6%
Pacific Islander	0.0%	0.0%	0.0%	—
Two or More Races	0.7%	1.0%	0.5%	—

== CATE half-day programs ==
The Half-Day Career & Technology Program began in August 1996. Through the program, students with special needs can take the majority of their academic classes at their home high schools and take career and technology classes at STISD high schools. The purpose of the Half-Day Career & Technology Program is to teach students in a real work environment so they gain a marketable edge in the workforce.

The following high schools offer the following programs:

- Med High: Nursing Assistant
- Medical Academy: Culinary Arts, Patient Care Assistant
- Sci Tech: Automotive Technology, Welding

== Academic achievement ==
Until 2012 a school district in Texas could receive one of four possible rankings from the Texas Education Agency: Exemplary (the highest possible ranking), Recognized, Academically Acceptable, and Academically Unacceptable (the lowest possible ranking).

Until 2017 a school district in Texas could receive one of three possible rankings from the Texas Education Agency: Met Standard (the highest possible ranking), Met Alternative Standard, and Improvement Required (the lowest possible ranking).

In 2018 the Texas Education Agency released a new accountability scale. A school district in Texas can receive one of five possible ratings from the Texas Education Agency: A (90-100) (the highest possible ranking), B (80-89), C (70-79), D (60-69), and F (0-59) (the lowest possible ranking).

Historical district TEA accountability ratings
School Year	Rating
2022	A (97)
2021	Not Rated: Declared State of Disaster
2020	Not Rated: Declared State of Disaster
2019	A (97)
2018	A (97)
2017	Met Standard
2016	Met Standard
2015	Met Standard
2014	Met Standard
2013	Met Standard
2012	No state accountability ratings were assigned in 2012.
2011	Exemplary
2010	Exemplary
2009	Exemplary
2008	Recognized
2007	Recognized
2006	Recognized
2005	Recognized
2004	Recognized

- All Districts and Schools Were Not Rated in 2020 Due to COVID-19.
- Distinction designations were not awarded in 2021.

== STISD Education Foundation ==
The purpose of the STISD Education Foundation is to raise, manage and invest funds for the benefit of STISD students.

== Schools ==
=== High schools ===
NAME	STUDENTS	FACULTY	12	11	10	9	8	7	6	5	4	3	2	1	K	PK	MAP	ZONE	LISTING	PROFILE	WEBSITE	NOTES
South Texas ISD Medical Professions (Medical Academy)	864 (20-21)		12	11	10	9											26.049433°N 97.553773°W			P	W	
South Texas ISD World Scholars (World Scholars)	534 (20-21)		12	11	10	9											26°17′55.67″N 98°10′41.42″W			P	W	
South Texas ISD Health Professions (Med High)	940 (20-21)		12	11	10	9											26°9′19.81″N 97°56′22.49″W			P	W	
South Texas ISD Science Academy (Sci Tech)	764 (20-21)		12	11	10	9											26°9′25.42″N 97°56′21.91″W			P	W	

=== Middle schools ===
NAME	STUDENTS	FACULTY	12	11	10	9	8	7	6	5	4	3	2	1	K	PK	MAP	ZONE	LISTING	PROFILE	WEBSITE	NOTES
South Texas ISD Rising Scholars (RSA)	535 (20-21)						8	7	6								26°9′18.8″N 97°39′40.35″W			P	W	
South Texas ISD Preparatory Academy (STPA)	614 (20-21)						8	7	6								26°17′50.22″N 98°10′42.43″W			P	W	
