= Henrietta M. King Early College High School =

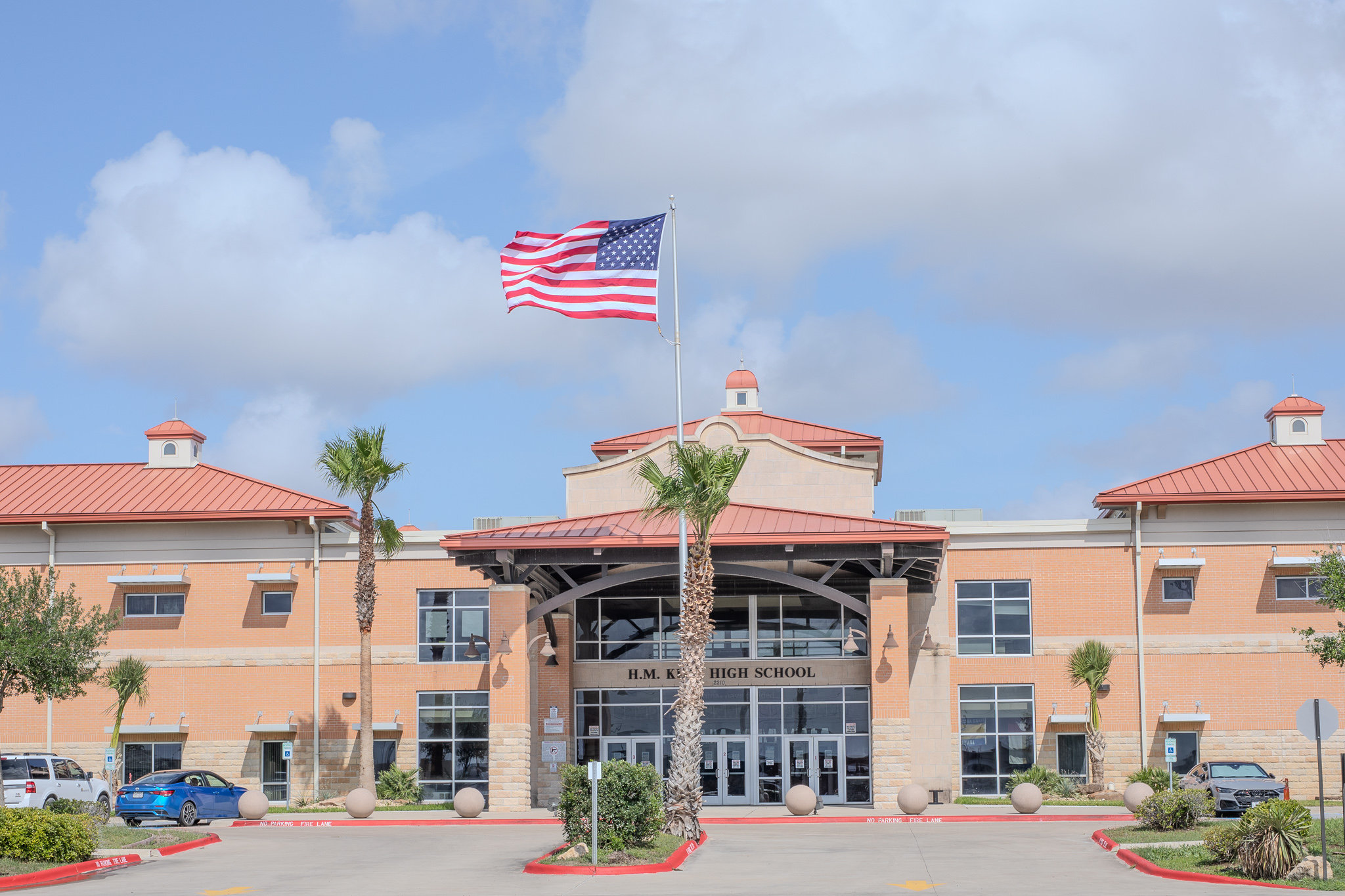
- Henrietta M. King Early College High School campus building in Kingsville, Texas.

Location
- 2210 S Brahma Blvd; Kingsville, Texas 78363-7108; United States; 27.4954°N 97.8541°W

Information
- School type: Public high school
- Established: 1910
- School district: Kingsville Independent School District
- Teaching staff: 61.98 (FTE)
- Grades: 9–12
- Enrollment: 933 (2023–2024)
- Student to teacher ratio: 15.05
- Colors: Black & gold
- Athletics conference: UIL Class 16 AAAA Div. I
- Mascot: Brahma
- Website: Henrietta M. King High School

Henrietta M. King Early College High School is a public high school located in Kingsville, Texas, US. It is part of the Kingsville Independent School District located in west central Kleberg County.

== History ==
- Henrietta M. King High School
- U.S. National Register of Historic Places
- Recorded Texas Historic Landmark
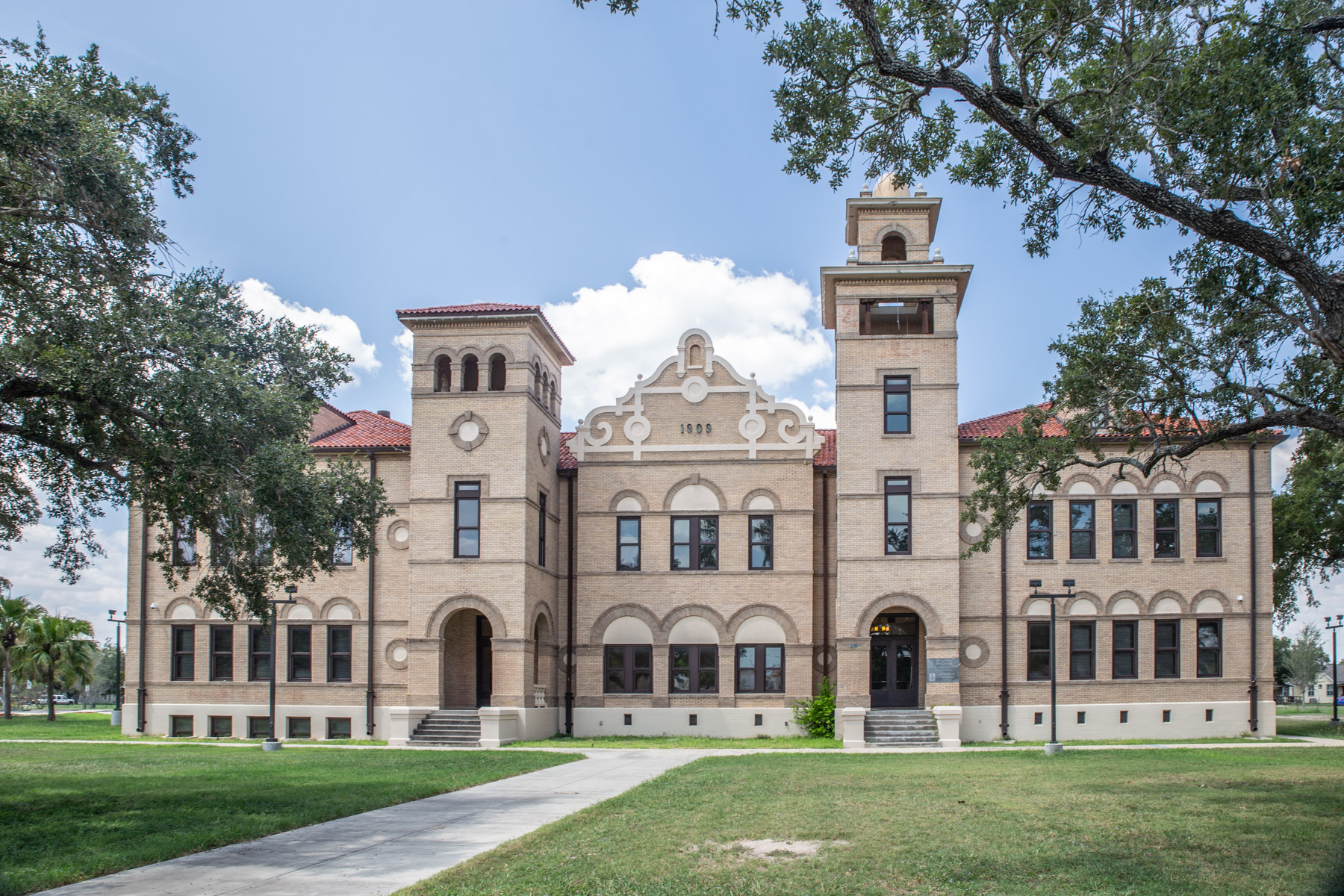
- Former H. M. King High School building

- Location within Texas Location within the United States
- Location: Kleberg Ave. and 3rd St., Kingsville, Texas
- Coordinates: 27°30′38″N 97°52′0″W
- Area: 6 acres (2.4 ha)
- Built: 1909
- Architectural style: Mission/Spanish Revival
- NRHP reference No.: 83003145
- RTHL No.: 2440

Significant dates
- Added to NRHP: May 9, 1983
- Designated RTHL: 1981

H. M. King High School is named after Henrietta King, the wife of Richard King, founder of the King Ranch. The school was previously located on a campus located at 400 West King Avenue. The Mission/Spanish Revival school building constructed on that site in 1909 was placed on the National Register of Historic Places in 1983 and designated a Recorded Texas Historic Landmark in 1981.

== Athletics ==
The Kingsville Brahmas compete in cross country, volleyball, football, basketball, powerlifting, soccer, golf, tennis, track & field, softball, and baseball.

=== State finalists ===
- Football – 1958 (3A)

=== Football ===
The school's football team plays its home games at Javelina Stadium.

=== Soccer ===
Both the girls' and boys' soccer teams play their home games at Mopac Field. The girls' soccer team is a 3-time district champion, area champion, and regional quarterfinalist.

== Arts ==
The school has a musical program which includes concert bands and a marching band. The H. M. King Mighty Brahma Marching Band reached the state-level UIL Marching Band Competition in San Antonio for the 14th time in the 2014–2015 marching season.

== Notable alumni ==
- Laura Canales, Tejano musician and member of the Tejano Music Hall of Fame
- Lauro Cavazos, Former Secretary of Education under Ronald Reagan and George H. W. Bush
- Richard E. Cavazos, First Mexican-American 4-star general
- James Jefferson (gridiron football), Former professional football player
- Reality Winner, federal contractor who pled guilty to illegally leaking top-secret information

== See also ==
- National Register of Historic Places listings in Kleberg County, Texas
- Recorded Texas Historic Landmarks in Kleberg County
