= Caesar Kleberg =

American conservationist and rancher (1873–1946)

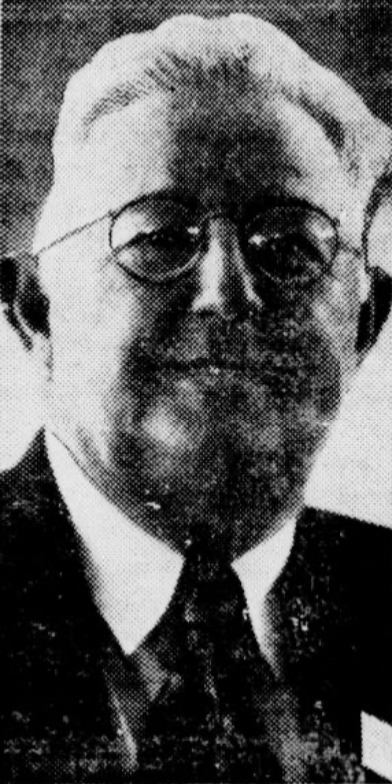
- Kleberg in a 1937 publication of The Nome Nugget
- Born: September 20, 1873; Cuero, Texas, US
- Died: April 19, 1946 (aged 72); King Ranch, Texas, US
- Education: St. Edward's University
- Occupations: Conservationist, rancher
- Known for: The father of wildlife conservation in Texas
- Political party: Democratic
- Father: Rudolph Kleberg
- Family: Kleberg

Caesar Kleberg (September 20, 1873 – April 19, 1946) was an American conservationist and rancher. A member of the Kleberg family, he operated part of King Ranch and helped modernize its production methods.

== Biography ==
Kleberg was born on September 20, 1873, in Cuero, Texas, to Rudolph and Mathilda Kleberg (née Eckhart). He studied at St. Edward's University, and following his graduation, moved to Washington, D.C. and worked as his father's secretary.

In 1900, Kleberg returned to Texas to work for King Ranch, under Henrietta King and his uncle, Robert J. Kleberg Jr.. He began in the Santa Gertrudis Division, later being transferred and becoming foreman on the Norias Division for thirty years, during which he was involved in the Raid on Norias Ranch in 1915. At King Ranch, he helped modernize its production and breeding. He helped develop the communities in King Ranch: he cofounded Kingsville and the St. Louis, Brownsville and Mexico Railway. He also was the one to purchase Old Sorrel for King Ranch, having first seen him in 1915. He lived in a two-story home on King Ranch, which lacked electricity and plumbing and had its bathtub on the porch.

A conservationist, Kleberg and Robert J. Kleberg Jr. were members of the Texas Animal Health Commission, and helped eradicate babesiosis from the state. He helped restore the northern bobwhite, turkey, and white-tailed deer in Texas, as well as introducing the nilgai to the state in 1924, its first appearance in the Western Hemisphere.

== Later life and legacy ==
A Democrat, Kleberg served as a delegate in five of its national conventions. He was a Freemason. He never married. He died on April 19, 1946, aged 72, in the Santa Gertrudis Division of King Ranch. In his will, he put his funds toward the establishment of the Caesar Kleberg Foundation for Wildlife Conservation.

In 1981, Texas A&M University–Kingsville established the Caesar Kleberg Wildlife Research Institute, which researches livestock and plant diseases. Since 2008, The Wildlife Society has awarded the Caesar Kleberg Award for Excellence in Applied Wildlife Research to "those who have distinguished themselves in applied wildlife research". In 2009, Kleberg was acknowledged as "the father of wildlife conservation in Texas" by the Texas Legislature. In 2017, Caesar Kleberg and The King Ranch by Duane M. Leach, a biography on Kleberg, was published.
