= Henrietta King =

American rancher and philanthropist (1832–1925)

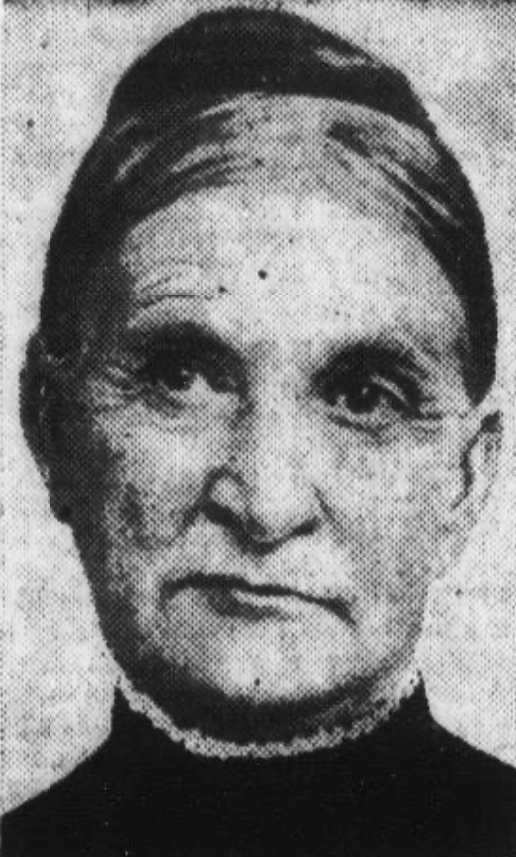
- King in a 1937 publication
- Born: Henrietta Maria Morse Chamberlain; July 21, 1832; Boonville, Missouri, US
- Died: March 31, 1925 (aged 92); King Ranch, Texas, US
- Education: Holly Springs Female Institute
- Occupations: Rancher, philanthropist
- Spouse: Richard King (m. 1854; died 1885)
- Children: 5
- Father: Hiram Chamberlain

Henrietta Maria King (née Morse Chamberlain; July 21, 1832 – March 31, 1925) was an American rancher and philanthropist. The wife of entrepreneur Richard King, she and Robert J. Kleberg Jr. managed King Ranch after his death in 1885.

== Biography ==
King was born on July 21, 1832, in Boonville, Missouri, to minister Hiram Chamberlain and his wife Maria (née Morse). Her mother died in 1835, and she and her father moved often throughout her childhood. For two years, beginning at age 14, she attended the Holly Springs Female Institute.

King and her father moved to Brownsville, Texas in early 1850. There, she taught at the Rio Grande Female Institute, which her father cofounded with Melinda Rankin. Her father could not find housing and rented a riverboat for them to live in. Her father tied the boat where Richard King dock his freighter. It resulted in conflict, though Richard found romantic interest in Henrietta. It ended with her ending an engagement with a Sunday school teacher and them marrying on December 10, 1854; between 1856 and 1864, they had five children together: Henrietta Maria (1856 – 1917), Ella Morse (1858 – 1900), Nathan Richard (1860 – 1922), Alice Gertrudis (1862 – 1944) and Robert E. Lee (1864 – 1883).

Their family lived in a jacal built of mud and sticks on the King Ranch, which her husband founded in 1852; the jacal was replaced by a house with a view of Santa Gertrudis Creek. While Richard King operated the ranch, she oversaw education and housing of communities living on the ranch. During the American Civil War, the King Ranch was a trade post for cotton. In 1863, Richard King left Henrietta and their children in their house alone, as he fled from Union capture. Henrietta too moved, to San Antonio, after the ranch was robbed by Union forces; they all returned when it became safe.

Following the death of Richard King in 1885, Henrietta inherited King Ranch, which was approximately 500,000 acres at the time, as well as his $500,000 of debt.The land was in a decade-long drought, which King later resolved. She and her son-in-law, Robert J. Kleberg Jr., worked to pay off the debt and expand the ranch, saving it from bankruptcy. – it reached 650,000 acres by 1895 and 1,173,000 acres by 1925, doubling the acres. King developed the settlements located within King Ranch: c. 1903, she gave 90,000 acres to railroaders Uriah Lott and Benjamin Franklin Yoakum, who created the St. Louis, Brownsville and Mexico Railway. She furthered development in the cities of Raymondville and Kingsville in 1904. She also established the Kleberg Town and Improvement Company and the Kingsville Lumber Company, as well as investing in other local companies. She donated land for churches, Spohn Hospital, and Texas A&M University–Kingsville.

King died on March 31, 1925, aged 92, on King Ranch, and was one of the richest women in the world at the time. During her funeral in Kingsville, her hearse was surrounded by 200 vaquero, each whose horse was branded with the Running W of King Ranch. Every horse walked around her open grave once. Her daughter, Alice Gertrude King, was the namesake of Alice, Texas. Alice married Robert J. Kleberg Jr., thereby connecting the King family to the Kleberg family. She is the namesake of the Henrietta M. King Early College High School, which was built upon land she donated in 1909. In 2011, she was inducted into the Texas Trail of Fame.
