= Hiram Chamberlain =

American minister and businessman (1797–1866)

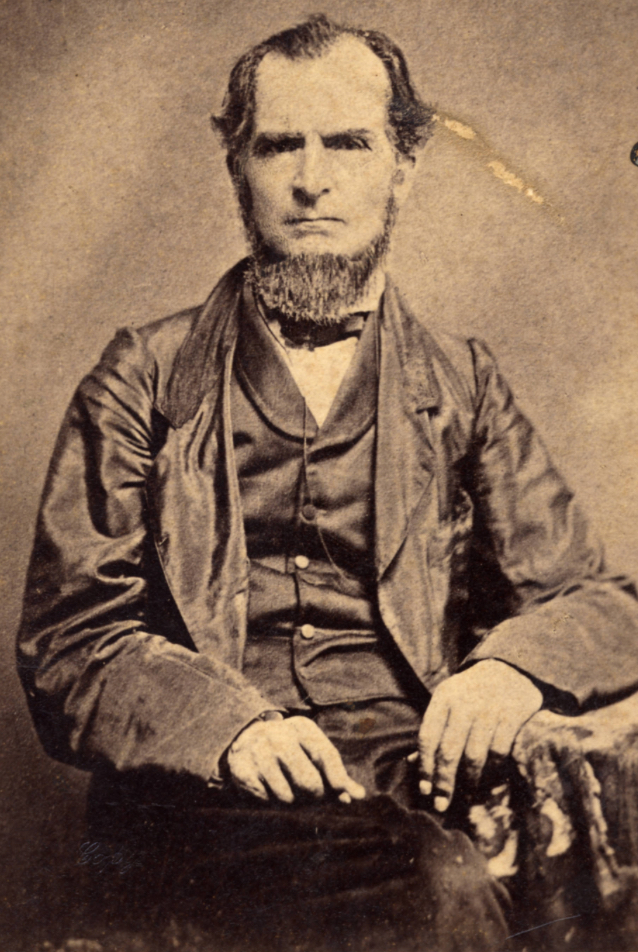
- Born: April 2, 1797; Monkton, Vermont, US
- Died: November 1, 1866 (aged 69); Brownsville, Texas, US
- Education: Middlebury College; Andover Theological Seminary; Princeton University
- Occupation: Minister
- Children: 10, including Henrietta

Hiram Chamberlain (April 2, 1797 – November 1, 1866) was an American minister and businessman. He was the father of rancher Henrietta King.

== Early life and education ==
Chamberlain was born on April 2, 1797, in Monkton, Vermont. Raised in the Burned-over district, he was a Presbyterian, being ordained a minister in 1818, by Gardiner Spring. He studied at Middlebury College, and following his 1822 graduation, he attended the Andover Theological Seminary. While in Andover, he was a founding member of the American Home Missionary Society. He graduated from the Andover Theological Seminary in 1825, which included a year of study at Princeton University.

== Career ==
Chamberlain was ordained a missionary on October 16, 1825. From 1825 to 1845, he preached at churches primarily in Eastern and Central Missouri, including churches in St. Louis and New Franklin. Other jobs of his included being a promoter of Marion College and publisher of the Herald of Religious Liberty, a St. Louis religious newspaper. In 1838, the Presbyterian Church in the United States of America split due to disagreements of slaveownership; Chamberlain, who owned no slaves, joined the pro-slavery side. He also believed in the separation of church and state.

Chamberlain moved to Memphis, Tennessee in 1845, then to Somerville, Tennessee in 1847, and to Brownsville, Texas in early 1850. On February 23 of the same year, he founded the First Presbyterian Church of Brownsville, also the first Presbyterian Church in the Lower Rio Grande Valley. In 1854, he and Melinda Rankin founded the Rio Grande Female Institute, an all-female school.

During the American Civil War, Chamberlain served as military chaplain of the 3rd Texas Infantry Regiment. Following the Confederate defeat, he accepted it as his god's will of keeping the country as one.

== Personal life and death ==
Chamberlain married Maria Morse on October 9, 1825. They had three children together, with only Henrietta surviving to adulthood. Throughout his life, he then married Sarah H. Wardlaw on April 19, 1836, followed by Anna Adelia Griswold, on October 16, 1842, the latter of which he had seven children with; five lived to adulthood. He died on November 1, 1866, aged 69, in his church in Brownsville. He is buried in the Old City Cemetery in Brownsville.
