= Santa Gertrudis Independent School District =

School district in Texas, United States

Location
- Kingsville, (Kleberg County), Texas, 78363; United States

District information
- Type: Public
- Motto: "We can’t hide our Lion pride!"
- Grades: Pre-K–12
- Established: 1917; 109 years ago
- Superintendent: Veronica Alfaro, Interim Superintendent

Students and staff
- Athletic conference: University Interscholastic League
- District mascot: Lions
- Colors: Royal Blue and Silver

Other information
- Principal, Santa Gertrudis: Fatima Garcia
- Principal, Academy: Charles Odom
- Website: www.sgisd.net

Santa Gertrudis Independent School District (SGISD) is a public school district in Kingsville, Kleberg County, Texas, United States. The district covers approximately 190 square miles (490 km^{2}), and is located in 40 miles (64 km) south of the city of Corpus Christi. SGISD operates Santa Gertrudis Elementary and Academy High School. During the 2009–2010 school year, SGISD had 397 students enrolled, according to Texas Education Agency.

A small slice of western Kingsville is in the district boundary.

== History of SGISD ==
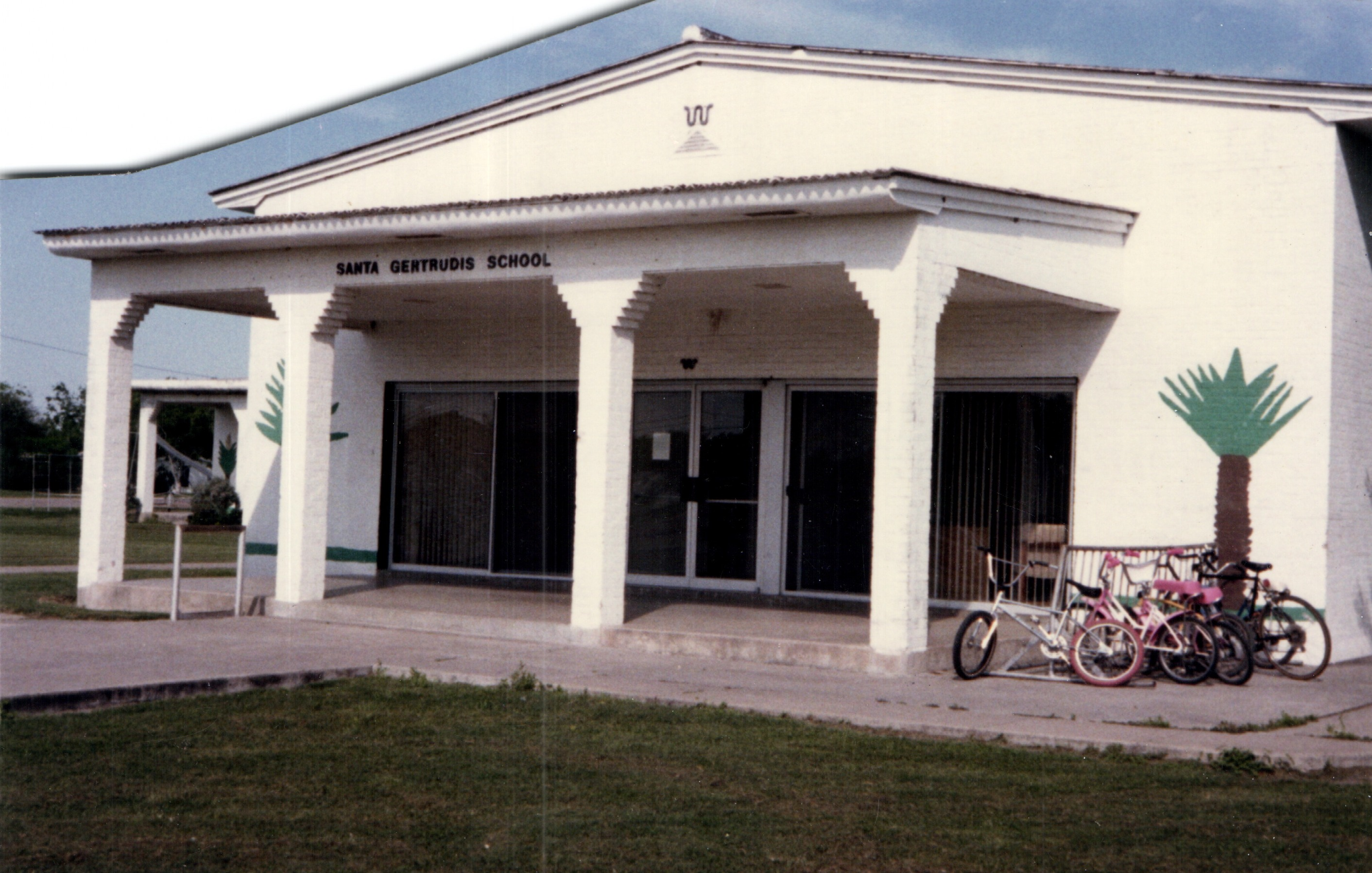
Santa Gertrudis School in 1987

Santa Gertrudis was formally established in 1917 as one of three schools associated with the King Ranch in South Texas. Today, Santa Gertrudis (now SGISD) is the only remaining school facility associated with the King Ranch. The district boundaries are located within the Santa Gertrudis division of the King Ranch and a small part of La Paloma Ranch. Santa Gertrudis ISD is fully accredited by the Texas Education Agency and has operated as an independent school district since 1942. Prior to 1942, the district operated as a common school and in 1953 the district was formally recognized by legislative action.

In 1993, Santa Gertrudis began accepting nonresident transfer student from other area districts (before then the school was intended solely for children of King Ranch employees). During the same year, the district also adopted a year around school calendar with four nine-week attendance periods, including two-week intersessions between attendance periods. The school year begins late July and runs through late May (or early June).

Prior to 1994 Santa Gertrudis was solely a pre-kindergarten through eighth-grade school. After eighth-grade, students left the district and entered area high schools. It was not until 1994 when a high school program, grades nine through twelve, was established in partnership with Driscoll Independent School District and Texas A&M University–Kingsville. The elementary school remained located on the King Ranch and the high school was, and is located on the Texas A&M University Kingsville Campus. The two campuses are five miles (8.0 km) apart in location.

=== Campus Construction ===
As of December 2009, SGISD is building a new campus for all students, located off of the King Ranch. This school is nearing completion and move in dates are scheduled for early 2010.

== Santa Gertrudis Elementary School ==
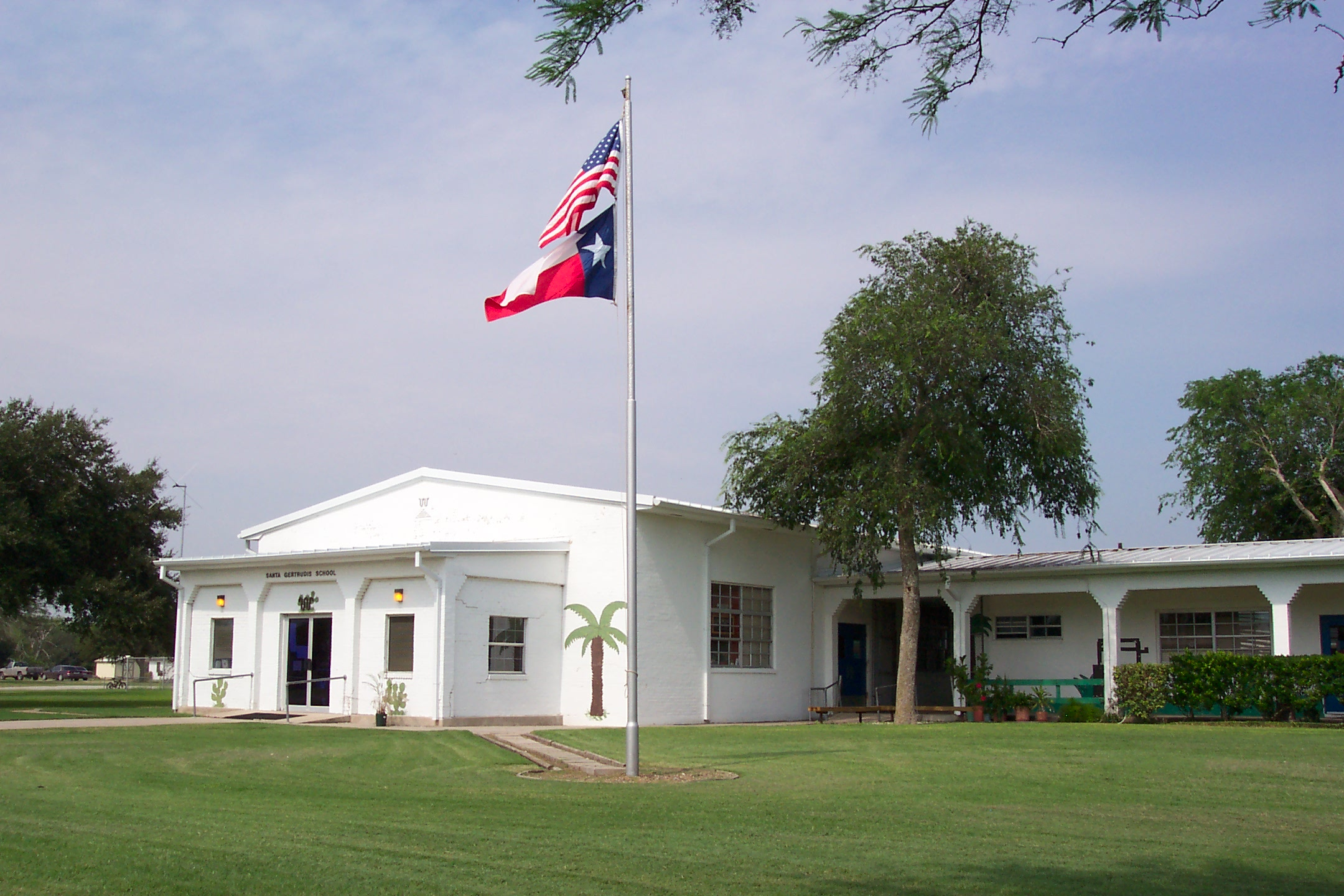
Front of the former Santa Gertrudis Elementary

Santa Gertrudis Elementary provides programs for pre-kindergarten through eighth-grade, and had 182 students enrolled during 2009–2010. The school is known for quality educational programs, advanced technology, a small student to teacher ratio, and a safe and supportive educational environment. Located in the heart of the King Ranch, Santa Gertrudis continues the tradition of educating the children of King Ranch that originated with the famed matriarch of Rancho Santa Gertrudis, Mrs. Henrietta M. King (1832–1925), wife of Richard King.

The current facility was designed by PBK Architects.

The previous facility, constructed in 1917, was leased from the King Ranch and located on ranch property. It was a 25,209-square-foot (2,342.0 m^{2}), 13 classroom complex with a classroom building, four annexes, two storage structures, and a gymnasium that had the possibility of being used for other reasons.

== Academy High School ==
Academy High School is a restructured, non-traditional high school program, with 210 enrolled during 2009–2010, located in Poteet Hall on the campus of Texas A&M University–Kingsville.

The non-traditional approach offers each student a program developed to meet individual needs and capabilities. Since students are allowed to progress at a pace conducive to their abilities, they can master course requirements and move on to the next higher level of work. Small class size allows extensive student-teacher interaction on a day-to-day basis.

=== History ===
Academy was approved by the Texas Education Agency in the spring of 1994 and the first year of operation was 1994–1995. Through support from Texas A&M University Kingsville, qualified students are able to begin college courses starting in the ninth grade.

Billy Bowman, then the superintendent of Santa Gertrudis ISD, created the concept.

The first graduation in 1998 was held at Naval Air Station Kingsville, and all 36 inaugural ninth grade students graduated. Fifty percent of the graduating seniors had earned 12 or more hours of college credit while in high school, 80% earned three or more hours, and 80% of the class entered post secondary education following graduation.

=== Athletics ===
Prior to 2007, Academy High School did not have a football team. In the fall of 07, academy successfully played its first season of six-man football, with a junior varsity team and five away games (no home games). During the first season, 44 athletes joined the team and became part of Academy High School history.

In 2018, the Lady Lions won the Class 3A Softball State Championship, defeating the Hughes Springs Lady Mustangs 8-3. The Lady Lions won their second state title in 2026, defeating the Coahoma Bulldogettes 8-1 in the Class 3A/D2 State Championship Game.

=== Entrepreneurship Program ===
In 1997, the Academy Entrepreneurship Program was established. The program is a school-based business in which students manage all facets of a computer business, from building desktops and computer maintenance and repair, to technology training for faculty and staff. The "Entre" program, Pride Computers, has built all the computers within the district, and it also performs all the computer maintenance for the district, including managing the network.

=== Advanced Studies Program ===
In the 2002–2003 school year, academy, working in collaboration with Coastal Bend College, established an Advanced Studies Program, offering students the opportunity to graduate high school with an Associate of Applied Science Degree in Computer Information Technology. Since the inception of the program, it has expanded to other career and degree areas within the community college. Students also have the opportunity to take courses at Texas A&M University Kingsville, to earn credits applicable towards a four-year degree. Students are allowed to take as many classes as desired, as long as they fit within a degree plan at an accredited university. All college courses are tuition free to the students and are funded through several grants from the State and other sources. Key developers of the Entrepreneurship Program and the Advanced Studies Program were Bill Fette, District Technology Coordinator, and Thom Driver, District Network Administrator. Bill Fette was the first to serve as Entrepreneurship Program Coordinator.

In 2005, due to the Advanced Studies Program, three students graduated with both a high school diploma and an associated degree from Coastal Bend College. The three students were: Hailee Bugenhagen, Justin Walker, and Omar Gonzalez.

==== College hours earned by each graduating class ====
- 1998 – 117 credit hours, 36 students
- 1999 – 98 credit hours, 34 students
- 2000 – 85 credit hours, 39 students
- 2001 – 101 credit hours, 28 students
- 2002 – 141 credit hours, 26 students
- 2003 – 221 credit hours, 35 students
- 2004 – 531 credit hours, 40 students
- 2005 – 587 credit hours, 32 students
- 2006 – 509 credit hours, 33 students
- 2007 – 486 credit hours, 43 students

== Demographics ==
The enrollment is 70.8% Hispanic, 27.2% Anglo, and 7% African American.

== Attendance rates ==
Santa Gertrudis had a 98.08% overall attendance rate for the week of 02/22/2010 to 02/26/2010.

- Pre-K = 99.26%
- Kinder = 98%
- 1st Grade = 94%
- 2nd Grade = 100%
- 3rd Grade = 96%
- 4th Grade = 81.02
- 5th Grade = 100%
- 6th Grade = 97.89%
- 7th Grade = 99.05%
- 8th Grade = 98.89%

Academy High school had a 94.72% overall attendance rate for the week of 02/22/2010 to 02/26/2010.

- 9th Grade = 95.36%
- 10th Grade = 97.02%
- 11th Grade = 93.49%
- 12th Grade = 92.53%

== School Board ==
- Jesse Garcia - President
- Carrie DeLaney – Vice-president
- Catherine Montalvo – Secretary
- Florinda Falcon – Trustee
- Delia Perez – Trustee
- Bobby Caldera – Trustee
- Oscar Cortez – Trustee
