= Driscoll Independent School District =

School district in Texas, United States

Address
- 425 West Dragon Street Driscoll, Texas, 78351; United States

District information
- Grades: PK–8
- Schools: 9
- NCES District ID: 4817550

Students and staff
- Students: 340 (2023–2024)
- Teachers: 25.35 (on an FTE basis)
- Student–teacher ratio: 13.41:1

Other information
- Website: www.driscollisd.us

Driscoll Independent School District is a public school district based in Driscoll, Texas, United States. The district serves students in prekindergarten to grade 8. In 2009, Driscoll ISD was rated as "exemplary" by the Texas Education Agency, the highest rating given by the state.

The district collaborated in the establishment of Academy High School of Santa Gertrudis Independent School District. The school opened in 1994.
