= Christian Congregational Churches in Mexico =

Aspect of religion in Mexico

Congregationalism in Mexico dates from the 19th century. In the 1850s and 1860s Melinda Rankin, a Congregational missionary, founded several communities, the majority of which joined the Presbyterian church. A small part remained independent. Later the Congregational Board of Mission in Boston, United States, planted additional congregations. In 1872 Reverend David Watkins with his wife founded churches in Guadalajara. Reverend Juan L. Stevens worked in Ahualulco but was assassinated by some fanatics. Later the work expanded in other parts in Mexico. In 2004 there were 800 members and 12 congregations.
