= Robert W. Lawless =

American academic (1937–2024)

16th President of the University of Tulsa
- In office 1996–2004
- Preceded by: Robert Donaldson
- Succeeded by: Steadman Upham

11th President of Texas Tech University
- In office 1989–1996
- Preceded by: Lauro Cavazos
- Succeeded by: Donald R. Haragan

Personal details
- Born: February 13, 1937 Baytown, Texas, U.S.
- Died: August 10, 2024 (aged 87) Lubbock, Texas, U.S.
- Education: Lee College; University of Houston; Texas A&M University

Robert William Lawless (February 13, 1937 – August 10, 2024) was an American academic and executive. He served as president of Texas Tech University from 1989 to 1996 and president of the University of Tulsa from 1996 to 2004. He held a Bachelor of Science degree (1964) from the University of Houston and a Doctor of Philosophy degree (1968) from Texas A&M University in operations research. Lawless also served as executive vice president and chief operations officer of Southwest Airlines from 1985 to 1989, after serving in various positions with the airline, including vice president for finance and chief financial officer.

Lawless succeeded Robert H. Donaldson, who announced his intention to resign at the end of the 1995-1996 year, after an often contentious 6-year tenure at TU, during which he often clashed with both students and faculty, (Note: Keith Bailey, chairman of the TU Board of Trustees, said that Donaldson's decision to resign was caused by "institutional stresses.") according to a news article. The same article noted that Lawless angered gay and lesbian students at Texas Tech in 1993 by a letter he wrote, calling their lifestyles "deviant...something that I can never condone, and hold in great contempt."

During his tenure at Tech, Lawless raised the school's endowment. from $40 million to $150 million. Tech also had 24,000 students when he moved from Lubbock, compared to TU's 4,386.

He died on August 10, 2024 in Lubbock, Texas.
