= Kingsville, Texas =

- City
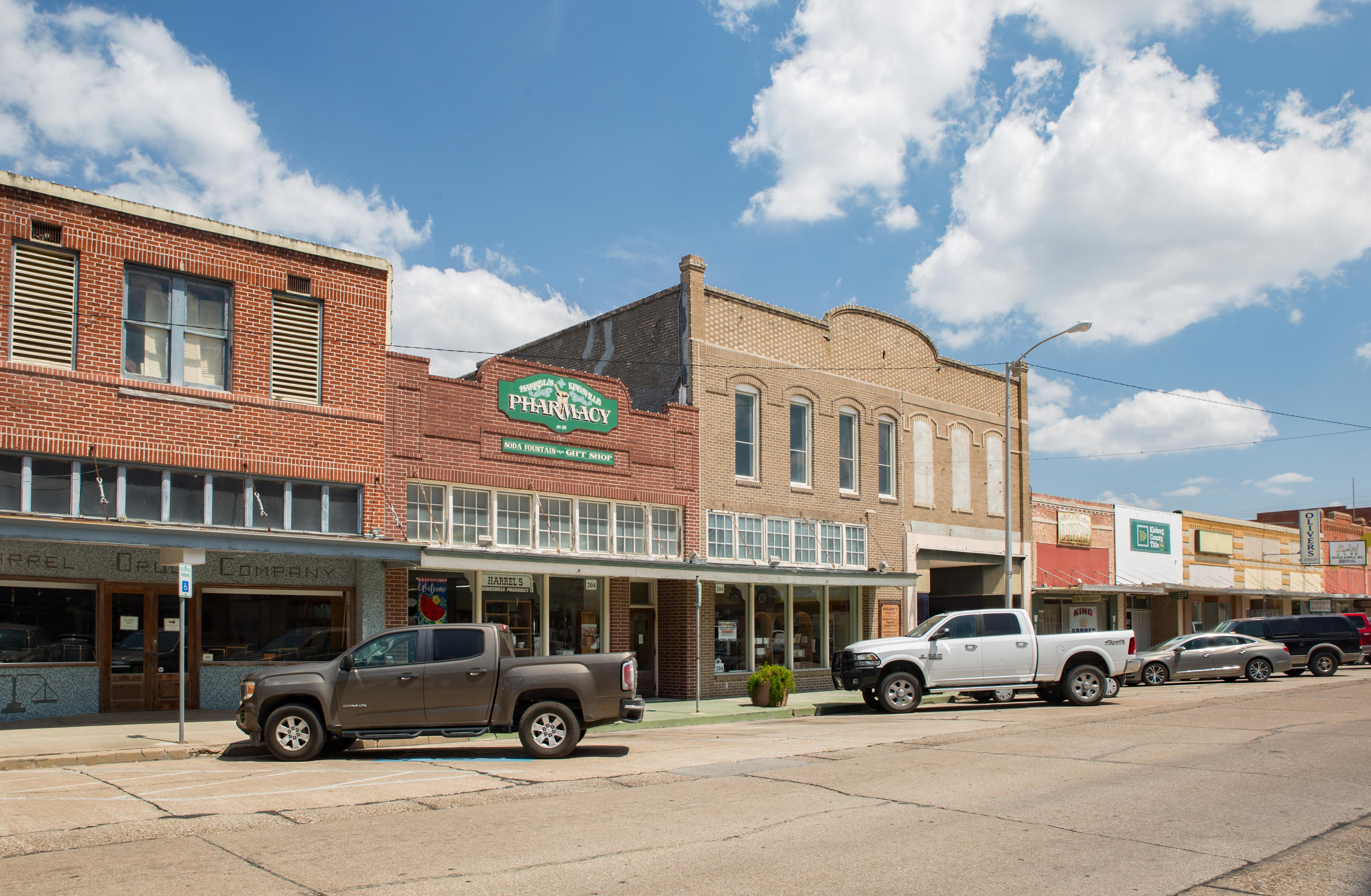
- Downtown Kingsville

- Location in the state of Texas Location in the United States
- Coordinates: 27°30′54″N 97°51′56″W
- Country: United States
- State: Texas
- County: Kleberg
- Settled: July 4, 1904 (122 years ago)
- Incorporated: 1911 (115 years ago)
- Named for: Richard King

Government
  - Type: Council-Manager
  - Mayor: Sam Fugate
  - Commissioners: Hector Hinojosa; Norma Nelda Alvarez; Edna Lopez; Lionel "Leo" Alarcon
  - Manager: Charles Sosa

Area
  - City: 13.91 sq mi (36.02 km^{2})
  - Land: 13.88 sq mi (35.96 km^{2})
  - Water: 0.023 sq mi (0.06 km^{2})
- Elevation: 59 ft (18 m)

Population (2020)
  - City: 25,402
  - Estimate (2022): 24,833
  - Density: 1,772.3/sq mi (684.27/km^{2})
  - Metro: 34,367
- Demonym: Kingsvillian
- Time zone: UTC-6 (Central (CST))
  - Summer (DST): UTC-5 (CDT)
- ZIP codes: 78363-78364
- Area code: 361
- FIPS code: 48-39352
- GNIS feature ID: 1374386
- Website: www.cityofkingsville.com

Kingsville is a city in the southern region of the U.S. state of Texas and the county seat of Kleberg County. Located on the U.S. Route 77 corridor between Corpus Christi and Harlingen, Kingsville is the principal city of the Kingsville Micropolitan Statistical Area, which is part of the larger Corpus Christi-Kingsville Combined Statistical Area. The population was 25,402 at the 2020 census, and in 2022 the U.S. Census Bureau estimated the population at 24,833.

Named in honor of Richard King, the city was founded to provide infrastructure for the adjacent King Ranch, as well as serve as the headquarters of the newly founded St. Louis, Brownsville and Mexico Railway. In 1904, the first tracks were laid and the first buildings constructed for the planned city. In 1911, the city was incorporated. It is home to Texas A&M University-Kingsville, a member of the Texas A&M University System, and Naval Air Station Kingsville, one of the U.S. Navy's two locations for jet aviation training.

== History ==
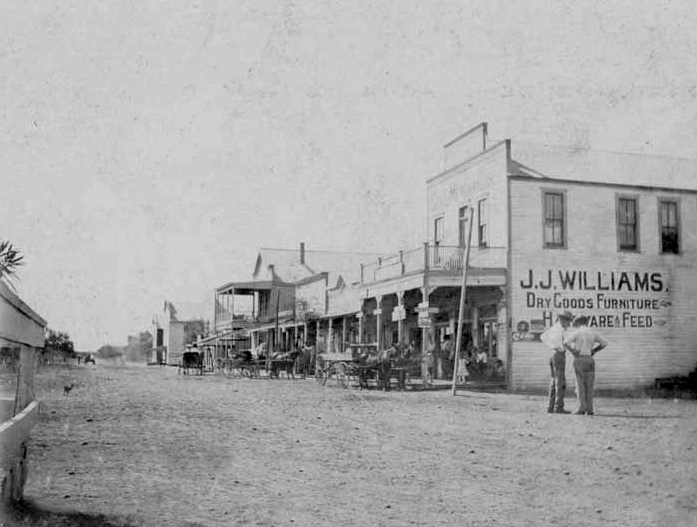
Kingsville, 1908

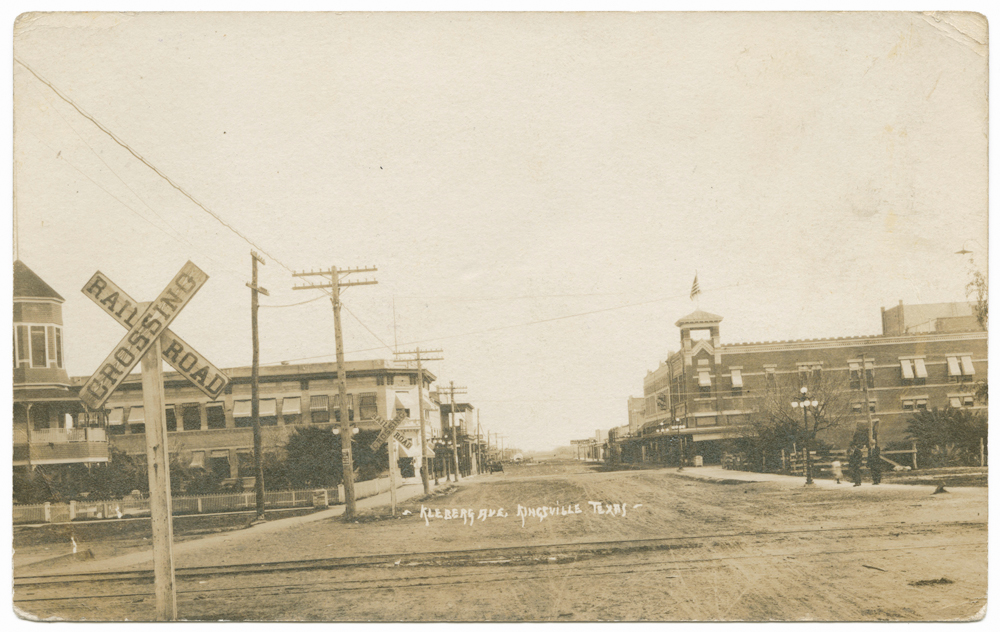
Kingsville, c. 1910s

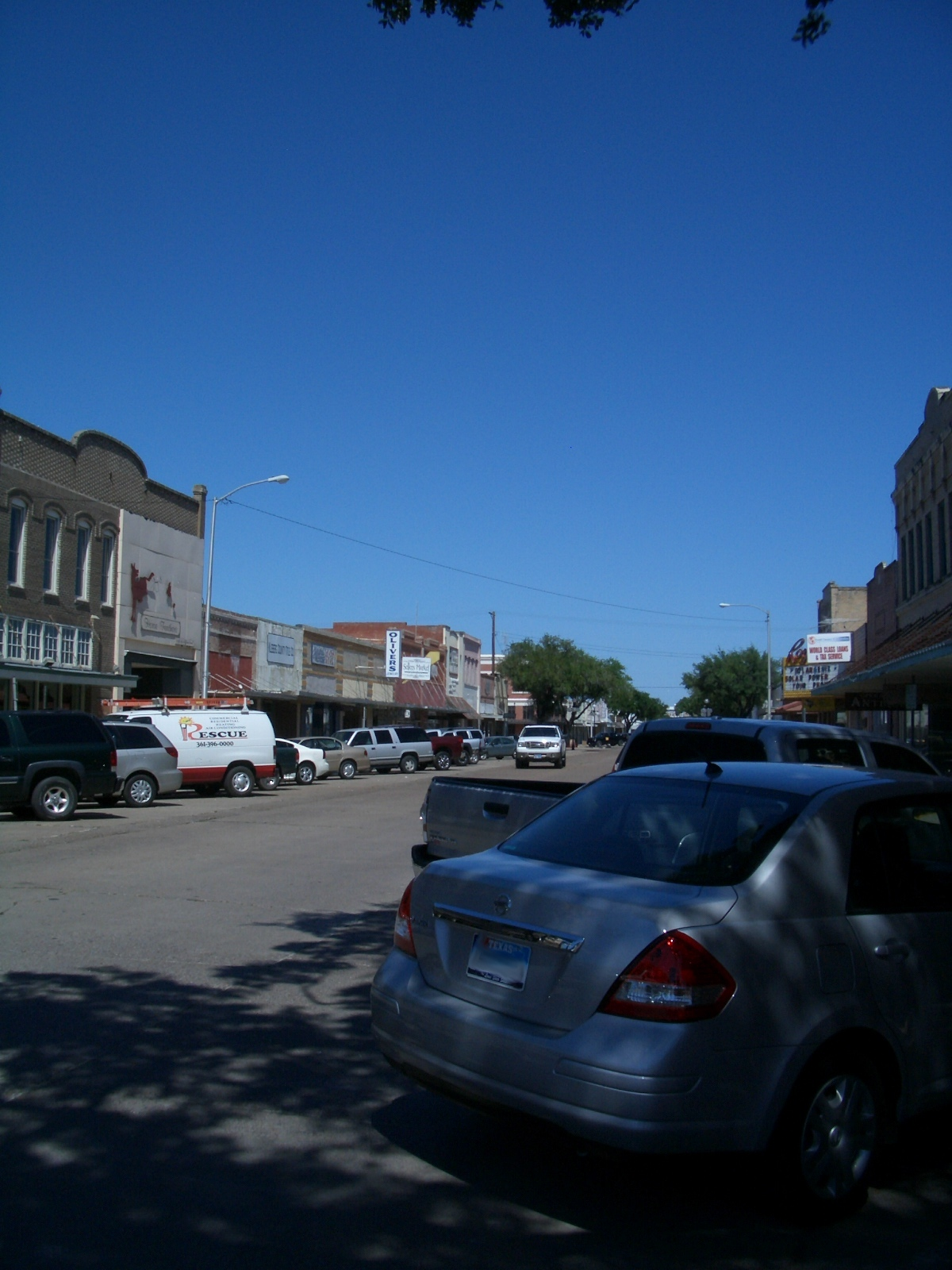
Kingsville, 2011

The history of Kingsville is closely intertwined with the city's main creek, the Santa Gertrudis. The first recorded inhabitants of the area were the Coahuiltecan Malaquites, surviving on seafood from nearby Baffin Bay, with settlements along the Santa Getrudis and San Fernando creeks, and the Cayo del Grullo branch of Baffin Bay. Large herds of mustangs roamed the south Texas plains, often drinking from the waters of spring fed creeks in and around present-day Kingsville. In 1803, Jose Lorenzo de la Garza established a settlement along the Santa Gertrudis. In 1846, General Zachary Taylor and his army camped along the banks of the Santa Gertrudis prior to their campaign into Mexico. In 1899, after many failed attempts, King ranch manager Robert J. Kleberg Jr., was finally able to tap into an underground lake of water. The discovery of readily accessible water paved the way for a future settlement next to the ranch.

=== 20th Century ===
With the continued growth of the King Ranch in the mid to late 19th century, the desire for a railroad through the region increased, both to connect the communities of the Rio Grande Valley to the rest of Texas, and to serve the King Ranch. At the turn of the 20th century, Henrietta King, widow of Richard King, deeded a portion of the ranch to entice the construction of a town and to bring a railroad adjacent to the ranch. Robert J. Kleberg, Jr. formed the Kleberg Town and Improvement Company in 1903, tasked with planning and constructing the town, at the bequest of his mother-in-law, Henrietta. In 1904, the community was planned three miles (4.8 km) from the King Ranch headquarters and was named in honor of the founder of the King Ranch, Richard King. The community would also house the headquarters of the newly formed St. Louis, Brownsville and Mexico Railway, a deal that was reached with railroad magnate Benjamin Yoakum. The first buildings were constructed, track was laid through the town, and the first train passed through Kingsville on July 4, 1904, considered the founding date of the city. Kingsville's first post office was also established that year.

By the close of the first decade of the 20th century, Kingsville already had a thriving business scene, with an active commercial club, that was the forerunner of the city's chamber of commerce today. In 1909, a library was established, an opera house built in 1910, and by 1911, the city was incorporated and the first city government was chartered. Two years later, in 1913, Kingsville was named the county seat of the newly established Kleberg County. Around 1920, oil and natural gas were discovered near Kingsville, leading to the city's first population boom.

Segregationalist policies and Jim Crow laws were present in Kingsville during the beginning of the 20th century. By the 1920s, three distinct segregated communities had emerged, the Spanish-speaking Tejano and migrant Mexican community of farm workers to the north, the African-American community that mostly worked the railroad to the south, and the Anglo-American community in the center of the city along the downtown region. Common practice in Anglo-American controlled towns in South Texas, in the early 20th century, was to create segregated neighborhoods, evidenced by the planning of separate schools and churches for the three segregated communities. The Ku Klux Klan had a presence in the town, boosting a mayor to election in 1922, and was responsible for the lynching of a visiting African-American physician from nearby Bishop in 1923.

In 1925, the South Texas Teachers College opened, one of only six normal schools in the entire state of Texas at the time, and the only south of College Station, Texas. The effort to open the school, led by King Ranch heir Caesar Kleberg and the city's commercial club, had been delayed due to political considerations in the state legislature, and funding issues from World War I. Later changing its name in 1929 to the Texas College of Arts and Industries (Texas A&I), then to Texas A&I University in 1967, the university went on to adopt its current name, Texas A&M University-Kingsville in 1993, after it joined the Texas A&M University System in 1989. In addition to offering a large swath of undergraduate and graduate degrees, the university is home to the National Natural Toxins Research Center, the Caesar Kleberg Wildlife Research Institute, and the Irma Lerma Rangel College of Pharmacy, the doctorate of pharmacy program for the Texas A&M University system.

During the national defense build up to World War II, local civic leaders and Congressman Richard Kleberg, another heir to the King Ranch, lobbied the War Department to choose Kingsville and other South Texas communities as a future site for a military airfield. In 1941, a naval air station opened in nearby Corpus Christi, after lobbying efforts by Congressman Kleberg, and began training pilots for the Navy and Marine Corps. Following Pearl Harbor and the United States' entry into the war, the need for increased pilot training and additional auxiliary airfields led to the Navy selecting Kingsville as the site of one, among several other municipalities. Plans were drawn up in 1941 and, in 1942, the U.S. Navy opened the new training airfield, Naval Air Auxiliary Station Kingsville, just to the east of town. Following World War II, the field was placed into a mothball status, but reopened shortly thereafter in 1951, and has been continuously operating since. NAS Kingsville is one of three major Naval Aviation jet training facilities for the Navy, and has had a significant impact on the economy and Kingsville's history.

Several major industries have called Kingsville home throughout the city's history. In 1944, the Celanese Corporation opened a plant north of Kingsville that is still in operation today. In the early 1960s, Humble Oil and Refining Company, now known as Exxon, relocated a district office to Kingsville due to the city's close proximity to nearby oil fields. Population steadily increased in Kingsville, peaking at just under 30,000 residents in the mid-1980s. Since that time, the city has experienced a mild economic slump, with the closing of Exxon's district office, decreased enrollment at the university, and the decreased economic impact of the petroleum industry all cited as factors for the city's decline.

In early 1997, Kleberg County commissioners ruled changed the official greeting to heaven-o at the request of Leonso Canales, Kingsville Flee Market owner, who said, "I see ‘hell’ in hello. It’s disguised by the ‘o,’ but once you see it, it will slap you in the face". The ruling was widely publicized but county staff called it "stupid" and "ridiculous", and few adopted the greeting.

== Geography ==
Kingsville is located in South Texas, approximately 33 miles (53 km) southwest of Corpus Christi, 91 miles (146 km) north of Harlingen and 101 miles (163 km) east of Laredo. According to the United States Census Bureau, in 2010, the city has a total area of 13.9 square miles (36 km^{2}), of which 13.8 square miles (36 km^{2}) is land and 0.04 square miles (0.10 km^{2}) (0.22%) is water. Kingsville is located in the geographic Gulf Coastal Plain region of the United States, known as the Coastal Bend in Texas, bordered by the Gulf of Mexico and Baffin Bay to the east, and the South Texas Plains or brush country to the north, west and south. Mesquite trees are found throughout the region, along with several types of cacti. Several creeks, fed by fresh-water springs, run through the city, including the San Fernando, Santa Gertrudis, and Escondido Creeks, all feeding into Baffin Bay.

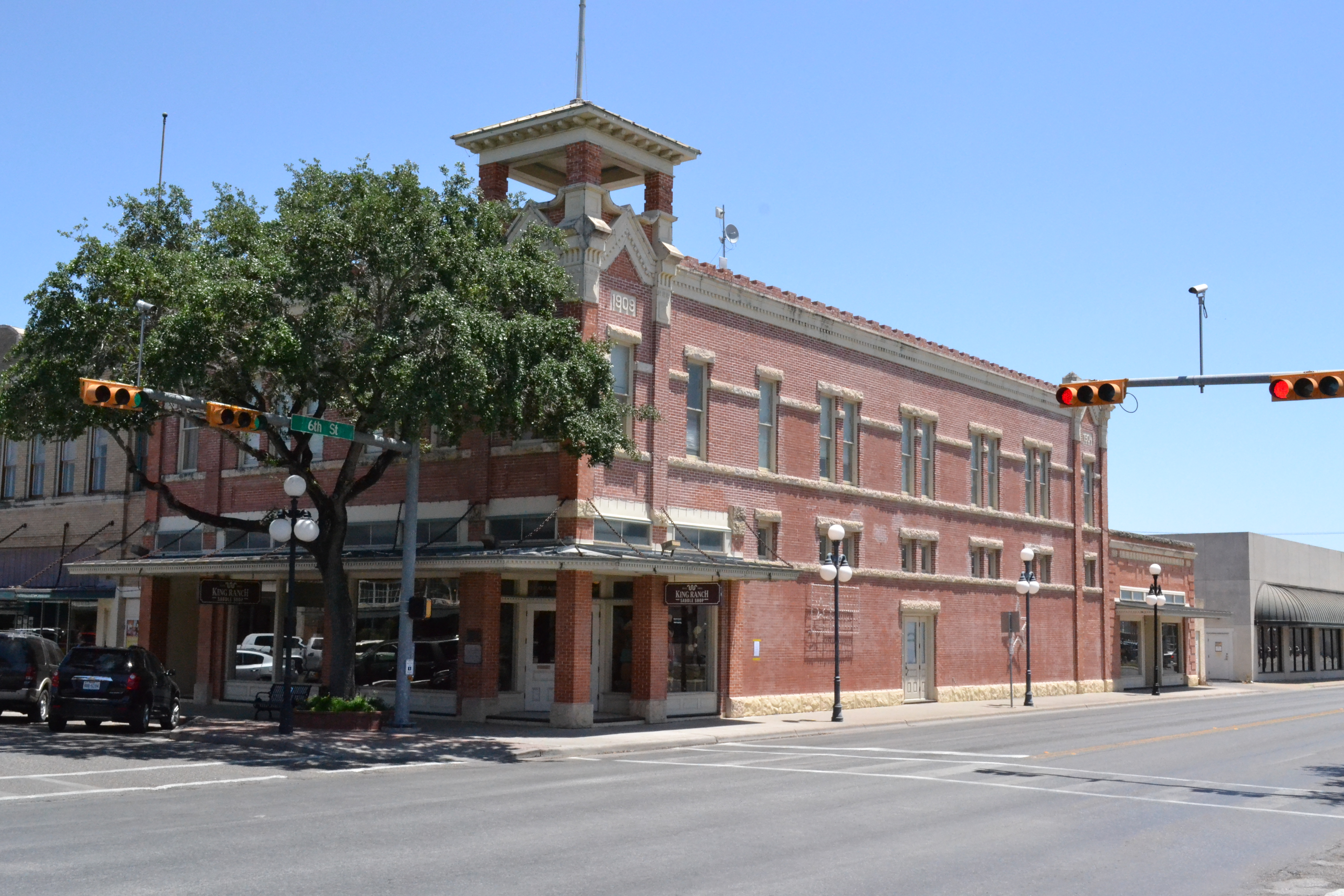
Ragland Mercantile Company Building, in downtown Kingsville

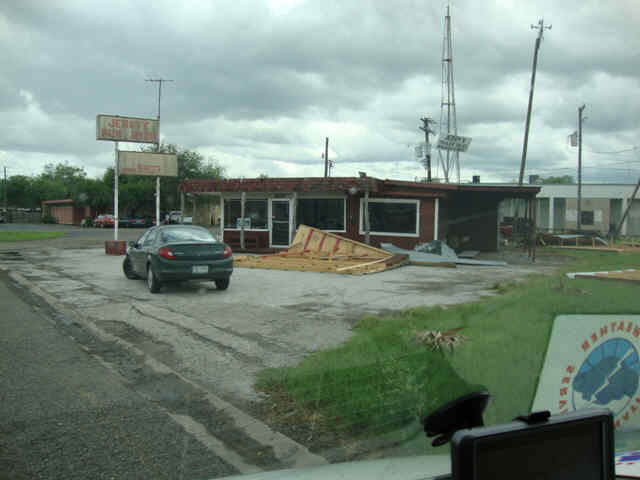
Damage from Tropical Storm Hermine in 2010

Kingsville is located in the historic Wild Horse Desert, an area of South Texas and northern Mexico where enormous herds of wild mustangs roamed. Due to water pumping and other environmental factors, the abundance of spring-fed creeks has decreased. Wildlife surrounding Kingsville include deer, wild turkey, and javelinas. Additionally, Kingsville is a winter home to a large number of waterfowl species, including geese, ducks, and pelicans. The city is surrounded by farmland producing various crops including cotton and sorghum. The terrain around Kingsville is generally flat, with an elevation of 59 feet above sea level at city center.

The city was planned in a grid system, and consists mostly of neighborhoods and subdivisions, as well as retail strip malls, located north and south of the main downtown area. Historic downtown runs from City Hall to the Kleberg County Courthouse, and features several buildings dating back to the turn of the century. Texas A&M University-Kingsville is located in the northwest section of the city, and Naval Air Station Kingsville is located east of Interstate 69E/U.S. Highway 77, which bisects the city north to south. There are several buildings in Kingsville recognized on the National Register of Historic Places, including the Kleberg County Courthouse, the Nance-Jones House, the John B. Ragland Mercantile Company Building located in the historic downtown area, which is also recognized as a historic district, and the original schoolhouse for the Henrietta M. King High School, which was recently renovated and houses the offices of the city government today.

=== Climate ===
The climate in this area is characterized by hot, humid summers and generally mild winters. According to the Köppen Climate Classification system, Kingsville has a humid subtropical climate, abbreviated "Cfa" on climate maps. Due to the city's close proximity to the Gulf of Mexico, several hurricanes and tropical storms have made landfall in Kingsville. In 1916, a Category 4 hurricane made landfall at Baffin Bay and directly hit Kingsville, inflicting nearly $100,000 of damage. Illinois' Governor Edward Fitzsimmons Dunne, who had been in the state inspecting Army camps along the Texas-Mexico border, was marooned in Kingsville overnight during the storm.

Climate data for Kingsville, Texas, 1991–2020 normals, extremes 1951–present
Month	Jan	Feb	Mar	Apr	May	Jun	Jul	Aug	Sep	Oct	Nov	Dec	Year
Record high °F (°C)	94 (34)	101 (38)	103 (39)	108 (42)	107 (42)	111 (44)	107 (42)	108 (42)	111 (44)	101 (38)	98 (37)	93 (34)	111 (44)
Mean maximum °F (°C)	84.5 (29.2)	89.0 (31.7)	92.8 (33.8)	96.6 (35.9)	97.6 (36.4)	100.3 (37.9)	101.3 (38.5)	102.4 (39.1)	99.3 (37.4)	94.9 (34.9)	89.4 (31.9)	85.4 (29.7)	104.5 (40.3)
Mean daily maximum °F (°C)	68.4 (20.2)	72.4 (22.4)	77.8 (25.4)	84.2 (29.0)	88.9 (31.6)	93.7 (34.3)	95.5 (35.3)	96.7 (35.9)	91.7 (33.2)	86.1 (30.1)	77.1 (25.1)	70.3 (21.3)	83.6 (28.7)
Daily mean °F (°C)	57.5 (14.2)	61.8 (16.6)	67.3 (19.6)	73.8 (23.2)	79.6 (26.4)	84.4 (29.1)	85.6 (29.8)	86.4 (30.2)	82.0 (27.8)	75.2 (24.0)	66.2 (19.0)	59.6 (15.3)	73.3 (22.9)
Mean daily minimum °F (°C)	46.6 (8.1)	51.2 (10.7)	56.9 (13.8)	63.4 (17.4)	70.3 (21.3)	75.1 (23.9)	75.8 (24.3)	76.1 (24.5)	72.4 (22.4)	64.2 (17.9)	55.3 (12.9)	48.9 (9.4)	63.0 (17.2)
Mean minimum °F (°C)	31.2 (−0.4)	34.7 (1.5)	38.8 (3.8)	46.4 (8.0)	57.2 (14.0)	68.6 (20.3)	70.8 (21.6)	70.9 (21.6)	61.8 (16.6)	46.1 (7.8)	36.9 (2.7)	31.0 (−0.6)	28.2 (−2.1)
Record low °F (°C)	11 (−12)	17 (−8)	24 (−4)	33 (1)	40 (4)	54 (12)	63 (17)	60 (16)	47 (8)	32 (0)	27 (−3)	10 (−12)	10 (−12)
Average precipitation inches (mm)	1.51 (38)	1.25 (32)	1.94 (49)	1.49 (38)	3.99 (101)	2.95 (75)	2.25 (57)	2.80 (71)	6.04 (153)	3.29 (84)	1.92 (49)	1.52 (39)	30.95 (786)
Average snowfall inches (cm)	0.0 (0.0)	0.0 (0.0)	0.0 (0.0)	0.0 (0.0)	0.0 (0.0)	0.0 (0.0)	0.0 (0.0)	0.0 (0.0)	0.0 (0.0)	0.0 (0.0)	0.0 (0.0)	0.1 (0.25)	0.1 (0.25)
Average precipitation days (≥ 0.01 in)	7.0	6.3	6.2	5.5	5.9	5.5	5.1	4.9	9.6	5.2	6.3	6.0	73.5
Average snowy days (≥ 0.1 in)	0.0	0.0	0.0	0.0	0.0	0.0	0.0	0.0	0.0	0.0	0.0	0.0	0.0
Source 1: NOAA
Source 2: National Weather Service

== Demographics ==
Historical population
Census	Pop.	Note	%±
1920	4,770		—
1930	6,815		42.9%
1940	7,782		14.2%
1950	16,898		117.1%
1960	25,297		49.7%
1970	28,995		14.6%
1980	29,949		3.3%
1990	25,276		−15.6%
2000	25,575		1.2%
2010	26,213		2.5%
2020	25,402		−3.1%
U.S. Decennial Census

In 2009, the population density of Kingsville was 1,848.8 inhabitants per square mile (713.8/km^{2}). There were 10,427 housing units, with an average density of 753.8 per square mile (291.0/km^{2}).

=== 2020 census ===
As of the 2020 census, Kingsville had a population of 25,402, 9,491 households, and 5,813 families residing in the city. The median age was 30.1 years; 23.4% of residents were under the age of 18 and 13.5% of residents were 65 years of age or older. For every 100 females there were 100.9 males, and for every 100 females age 18 and over there were 99.3 males age 18 and over.

Of the 9,491 households in Kingsville, 32.0% had children under the age of 18 living in them. Of all households, 36.6% were married-couple households, 25.3% were households with a male householder and no spouse or partner present, and 30.7% were households with a female householder and no spouse or partner present. About 29.3% of all households were made up of individuals and 9.3% had someone living alone who was 65 years of age or older.

There were 11,416 housing units, of which 16.9% were vacant. The homeowner vacancy rate was 2.0% and the rental vacancy rate was 16.9%.

98.1% of residents lived in urban areas, while 1.9% lived in rural areas.

Racial composition as of the 2020 census
Race	Number	Percent
White	13,669	53.8%
Black or African American	1,090	4.3%
American Indian and Alaska Native	213	0.8%
Asian	790	3.1%
Native Hawaiian and Other Pacific Islander	1	0.0%
Some other race	3,121	12.3%
Two or more races	6,518	25.7%
Hispanic or Latino (of any race)	18,276	71.9%

=== 2007-2011 ACS 5-Year Estimate ===
There were 25,994 residents in 9,103 households, and 5,837 families living in the city. 1,192 housing units were vacant. The rental vacancy rate was 9.3 percent while the homeowner vacancy rate was 3.9 percent. 57.1 percent of all housing units were built between 1950 and 1979. Only 9.9 percent were built in 2000 or later. The median value of an owner-occupied unit was $69,500.

Of the 9,103 households, 36.5 percent had children under the age of 18. 40.6 percent were married couples living together, 17.5 percent had a female householder with no husband present, and 35.9 percent were non-families. 25.0 percent of all households were made up of single individuals, and 8.5 percent had someone living alone who was aged 65 or above. The average household size was 2.67, and the average family size was 3.26.

The racial makeup of the city was 83.3 percent White, 4.7 percent African American, 2.8 percent Asian, 0.6 percent Native American, 0.1 percent Pacific Islander, 6.8 percent from other races, and 1.7 percent from two or more races. Hispanics or Latinos of any race made up 72.4 percent of the population.

The population was spread out, with 30.1 percent under 20 years of age, 39.2 percent aged 20 to 44, 18.9 percent aged 45 to 64, and 11.9 percent aged 65 or above. The median age was 27.6. For every 100 females, there were 106.5 males. For every 100 females aged 18 and over, there were 107.3 males. For every 100 females aged 18 to 64, there were 114.1 males. For every 100 females aged 65 and over, there were 74.2 males.

The median household income in the city was $33,785, and that for a family was $43,167. Males had a median income of $44,854 versus $26,447 for females. The per capita income for the city was $18,271. About 20.0 percent of families and 27.7 percent of the population were below the poverty line, including 30.7 percent of those under 18 and 12.0 percent of those aged 65 or over. The unemployment rate expressed as a percentage of persons aged 16 and over, was 6.7 percent. The unemployment rate, when expressed as a percentage of labor force participants aged 16 and over, was 11.4 percent.

== Economy ==
The main economic driving forces in the city and the surrounding region are agriculture, oil and natural gas production, chemical refining, tourism, and the military. Westwater Resources owns and operates one of only a handful of uranium mines in Texas in Kingsville. The mine, called the Kingsville Dome mine and processing plant, has operated on and off between 1989 and 2009, and produced nearly 4.2 million pounds of uranium through an in situ recovery process, pulling uranium from groundwater. NAS Kingsville has had a large economic impact on the city since it opened in 1942. Today, an estimated one in seven residents of the Kingsville area are in some way associated with the base. The base employs just over 1,600 residents.

== Government ==
In the United States House of Representatives, Kingsville is in Texas's 34th congressional district, represented by Democrat Vicente Gonzalez.

== Education ==
=== Primary and secondary schools ===
Due to the structure and zoning of Texas independent school districts, they cross city boundaries. Public primary and secondary school districts that include portions of Kingsville include: Kingsville Independent School District (KISD) for the majority of the city, Ricardo Independent School District (for a small southern portion), and the Santa Gertrudis Independent School District (SGISD) (for a small western portion). There are two high schools within Kingsville: Henrietta M. King Early College High School operated by KISD, and Academy High School operated by SGISD. Ricardo ISD high school students move on to Kaufer Early College High School, which is operated by Riviera Independent School District. Other KISD schools include John S. Gillett Middle school, and A.D. Harvey, Alice G.K. Kleberg, Jesus R. Perez, and N.M. Harrel elementary schools. Additionally, KISD operates the Pogue Options Alternative Academy. SGISD operates one elementary and junior high school, the Santa Gertrudis School. In 2018, KISD received an 'F' rating from the Texas Education Agency, and no grade for 2019, due to data integrity. Conversely, SGSID received a grade of 'A' for both 2018 and 2019.

Private schools include the Epiphany Episcopal School, Christian Life Academy, and the Presbyterian Pan American School.

St. Gertrude the Great School of the Roman Catholic Diocese of Corpus Christi was formerly in Kingsville. The school closed in 2019. It was the final Catholic school in the Kingsville region.

=== Tertiary education ===
Bell tower atop College Hall, Texas A&M University-Kingsville

The main campus of Texas A&M University-Kingsville (TAMUK) is located in the northwest portion of the city. Additionally, the Irma Lerma Rangel College of Pharmacy (part of Texas A&M University Health) is located on the campus of TAMUK.

Under Texas law, the Kingsville ISD, Santa Gertrudis ISD, and Ricardo ISD areas are all in the boundary of Coastal Bend College (referred to in legislation under its former name, "Bee County College"). Coastal Bend College has a campus in Kingsville offering several certificate and associate degree programs.

== Infrastructure ==
=== Transportation ===
==== Highways ====
- Interstate 69E/U.S. Highway 77
- State Highway 141

==== Air travel ====
- Kleberg County Airport (in Kingsville)
- Corpus Christi International Airport (in Corpus Christi)

==== Railway ====
- Union Pacific Railroad

== Notable people ==
- Lynn Adams, golfer, a one-time winner on the LPGA Tour
- Santa Barraza, visual artist
- Ronnie Bull, professional football player
- Jeff & Greg Burns, composers of electronic and orchestral music
- Laura Canales, Tejano musician
- Brothers Lauro Cavazos and Richard E. Cavazos. Lauro served as Secretary of Education and was the first Hispanic to serve in the United States Cabinet. Richard was the U.S. Army's first Hispanic four-star general and served as head of the U.S. Army Forces Command
- Chuck Clements, quarterback for the New York Jets
- Kennedy M. Crockett, U.S. Ambassador to Nicaragua from 1967 to 1970
- Matthew Dear, music producer, D.J. and electronic avant pop artist
- Steve Denton, professional tennis player, and tennis coach at Texas A&M University
- M. Stanton Evans, journalist, author and educator
- Donald Hollas, professional football player
- James Jefferson, professional football player
- Zona Jones, country music singer, and attorney
- Richard M. Kleberg, a seven-term member of U.S. House of Representatives and an heir to King Ranch
- David L. Lindsey, a novelist working primarily in the mystery and crime fiction genres
- Carmen Lomas Garza, visual artist and illustrator
- José Manuel Lozano, member of the Texas House of Representatives since 2011 from Kingsville
- Jack Mildren, an All-American quarterback at The University of Oklahoma, professional football player, oil company owner, 13th Lieutenant Governor of Oklahoma, and bank executive
- Jim Morrison, musician
- Dwayne Nix, football player elected to the College Football Hall of Fame
- Luke Patterson, professional football player
- Kit Pongetti, actress, singer, and writer
- Irma Lerma Rangel, former member of the Texas House of Representatives, first Mexican-American female attorney in Kingsville
- Kimberly Scott, actress
- Reality Winner (born 1991), American intelligence specialist pled guilty to felony transmission of national defense information
- Willie Wood, a professional golfer who played on the PGA Tour, Nationwide Tour, and Champions Tour
