= Richard E. Cavazos =

United States Army general (1929–2017)

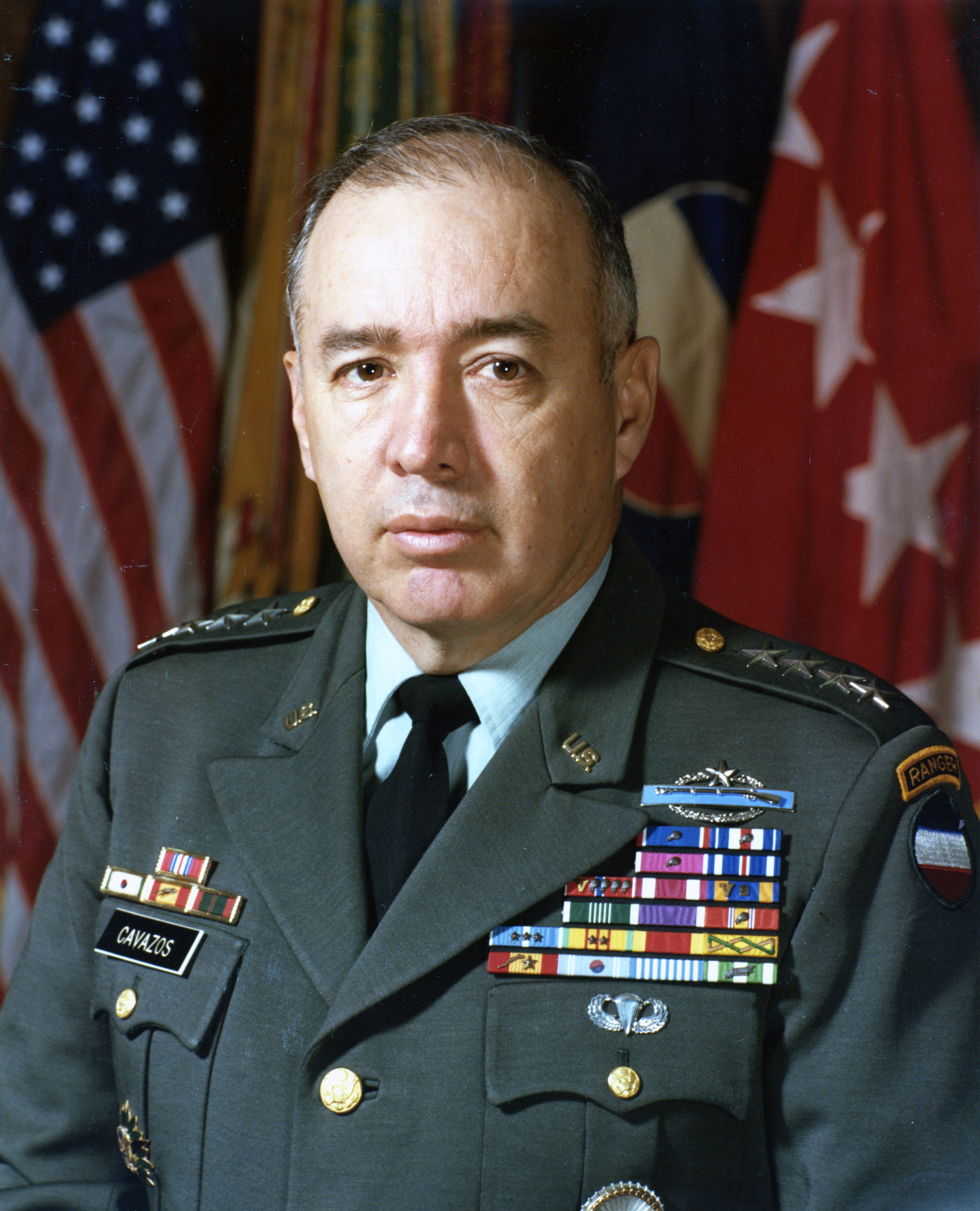
- General Richard E. Cavazos
- Born: 31 January 1929; Kingsville, Texas, U.S.
- Died: 29 October 2017 (aged 88); San Antonio, Texas, U.S.
- Burial place: Fort Sam Houston National Cemetery
- Alma mater: Texas Tech University (BS)
- Military career
- Allegiance: United States
- Branch: United States Army
- Service years: 1951–1984
- Rank: General
- Commands: United States Army Forces Command (1982–84); III Corps (1980–82); 9th Infantry Division (1977–80); 2nd Brigade, 1st Infantry Division (1976); 1st Battalion, 18th Infantry Regiment (1967); Company E, 2d Battalion, 65th Infantry Regiment, 3d Infantry Division (1953)
- Conflicts: Korean War; Vietnam War; Operation Urgent Fury
- Awards: Medal of Honor; Distinguished Service Cross; Army Distinguished Service Medal; Silver Star (2); Defense Superior Service Medal; Legion of Merit (2); Distinguished Flying Cross; Bronze Star Medal (5); Purple Heart
- Other work: Texas Tech University Board of Regents

Richard Edward Cavazos (31 January 1929 – 29 October 2017) was a United States Army four-star general. He was a Korean War recipient of the Distinguished Service Cross as a first lieutenant and advanced in rank to become the United States Army's first Hispanic four-star general. During the Vietnam War, as a lieutenant colonel, Cavazos was awarded a second Distinguished Service Cross. In 1976, Cavazos became the first Mexican-American to reach the rank of brigadier general in the United States Army. Cavazos served for 33 years, with his final command as head of the United States Army Forces Command. On 25 May 2022, the Naming Commission recommended that Fort Hood be renamed to Fort Cavazos, in recognition of Cavazos' military service. Defense Secretary Lloyd Austin ordered the renaming on 6 October 2022. The re-designation as Fort Cavazos occurred on 9 May 2023, although in 2025 it was renamed Fort Hood. Cavazos' Korean War Distinguished Service Cross was upgraded to the Medal of Honor and posthumously awarded to him on 3 January 2025.

== Early life and education ==
Richard Cavazos, a Mexican-American, was born on 31 January 1929, in Kingsville, Texas. His brother was former United States Secretary of Education, Lauro Cavazos. He earned a Bachelor of Science degree in geology from Texas Technological College (now Texas Tech University) in 1951, where he played on the football team and was a distinguished graduate of the Reserve Officers' Training Corps program. He received further military education at the Command and General Staff College, the British Army Staff College, the Armed Forces Staff College, and the United States Army War College. He received basic officer training at Fort Benning, Georgia, followed by training at Airborne School. He then deployed to Korea with the 65th Infantry.

== Military career ==
=== Korean War ===
During the Korean War, as a member of the 65th Infantry Regiment, a unit of mostly natives of Puerto Rico, he distinguished himself, receiving both Distinguished Service Cross and Silver Star for his heroic actions. On January 3, 2025 his DSC was upgraded to the Medal of Honor.

On 25 February 1953, Cavazos's Company E was attacked by the enemy. During the fight against a numerically superior enemy force, Cavazos distinguished himself and received the Silver Star for his actions. His company was able to emerge victorious from the battle. On 14 June 1953, Cavazos again distinguished himself during an attack on Hill 142, and was awarded the Distinguished Service Cross for his heroic actions on that day.

=== Vietnam War ===
In February 1967, Cavazos, then a lieutenant colonel, became commander of the 1st Battalion, 18th Infantry Regiment. In October and November 1967, his battalion was engaged in fighting near the Cambodian border. During an attack at Loc Ninh in October 1967, his unit was able to repulse the enemy. For his valiant leadership at Loc Ninh, he was awarded a second Distinguished Service Cross.

==== Distinguished Service Cross citation (second award) ====
On 17 December 1967, per General Orders No. 6479, Lieutenant Colonel Cavazos was awarded his second Distinguished Service Cross for his actions on 30 October 1967. His citation reads:

The Distinguished Service Cross (First Oak Leaf Cluster) is presented to Richard E. Cavazos, Lieutenant Colonel (Infantry), U.S. Army, for extraordinary heroism in connection with military operations involving conflict with an armed hostile force in the Republic of Vietnam, while serving with Headquarters and Headquarters Company, 1st Battalion, 18th Infantry, 3d Brigade, 1st Infantry Division. Lieutenant Colonel Cavazos distinguished himself by exceptionally valorous actions on 30 October 1967 while, as battalion commander, he led his unit on a search and destroy operation in a large rubber plantation near Loc Ninh. One of his companies was making a reconnaissance when it suddenly began receiving heavy fire from a Viet Cong battalion in well-entrenched positions on the slope of a hill. Colonel Cavazos immediately led his other elements forward and engaged the enemy forces as they began assaulting the company. Constantly exposed to savage hostile fire and shrapnel from exploding grenades, he moved among his troops directing a counterattack. As the Viet Cong broke contact and fled to their fortified positions on the hillside, Colonel Cavazos called for air strikes and artillery fire on the crest and forward slopes of the hill in order to cut off the insurgents' line of retreat. When the fighting reached such close quarters that supporting fire could no longer be used, he completely disregarded his own safety and personally led a determined assault on the enemy positions. The assault was carried out with such force and aggressiveness that the Viet Cong were overrun and fled their trenches. Colonel Cavazos then directed artillery fire on the hilltop, and the insurgents were destroyed as they ran. His brilliant leadership in the face of grave danger resulted in maximum enemy casualties and the capture of many hostile weapons. Lieutenant Colonel Cavazos' extraordinary heroism and devotion to duty were in keeping with the highest traditions of the military service and reflect great credit upon himself, his unit, and the United States Army.

=== Post-Vietnam ===
After Vietnam, Cavazos served as commander of the 2nd Brigade, 1st Infantry Division, and commander of the 9th Infantry Division.

In 1976, Cavazos became the first Hispanic to reach the rank of brigadier general in the United States Army. In 1980, he became commander of III Corps.

In 1982, Cavazos again made military history by being appointed the army's first Hispanic four-star general. The same year, Cavazos assumed command of the United States Army Forces Command. His early support for the National Training Center and his involvement in the development of the Battle Command Training Program enormously influenced the war fighting capabilities of the United States Army.

On 17 June 1984, after thirty-three years of distinguished service, General Cavazos retired from the United States Army.

=== In retirement ===
In 1985, Cavazos was appointed to the Chemical Warfare Review Committee by President Reagan. Cavazos served on the Board of Regents of his alma mater, Texas Tech University.

=== Personal life ===
Born in Kingsville, Texas, Cavazos grew up on King Ranch. Cavazos was married with four children. He resided in San Antonio, Texas.

He was the brother of Lauro Cavazos, former Texas Tech University president and former United States Secretary of Education.

Cavazos died at the age of 88 in San Antonio on 29 October 2017, due to complications of Alzheimer's disease. He was buried with full military honors at Fort Sam Houston National Cemetery.

== Medal of Honor citation ==

The President of the United States of America, authorized by Act of Congress, March 3, 1863, has awarded in the name of Congress the Medal of Honor to

FIRST LIEUTENANT
RICHARD E. CAVAZOS
UNITED STATES ARMY

For conspicuous gallantry and intrepidity at the risk of his life above and beyond the call of duty:

First Lieutenant Richard E. Cavazos distinguished himself by acts of gallantry and intrepidity above and beyond the call of duty, while serving as the Company Commander, Company E, 2d Battalion, 65th Infantry Regiment, 3d Infantry Division, on June 14–15, 1953, in the vicinity of Sagimak, Korea. On the night of June 14, First Lieutenant Cavazos led his company in a raid on an entrenched enemy outpost with the mission of destroying the personnel and installation thereon. During the initial attack, First Lieutenant Cavazos led his men through intense enemy mortar and artillery fire. Upon entering the trenches, fierce close combat ensued during which First Lieutenant Cavazos directed heavy fire on the enemy and their positions. When an extremely intense enemy mortar and artillery barrage hit his position, First Lieutenant Cavazos withdrew the company and regrouped his men. Twice more he led his men through intense enemy fire in assaults on the enemy position, destroying vital enemy fortifications and personnel. During the entire assault, First Lieutenant Cavazos gave effective commands and words of encouragement to his men and by his personal example and leadership inspired them to heroic heights of achievement. When ordered to withdraw his company, First Lieutenant Cavazos complied but remained alone on the enemy outpost to search for missing men. Although exposed to enemy fire, First Lieutenant Cavazos located five battle casualties and evacuated each, one by one, to a point on the reverse slope of a nearby hill where they could be safely recovered by friendly forces. Returning to the battlefield, he found a small group of men who had become separated from the main assaulting force and personally led them to safety. When informed that there were still men missing, First Lieutenant Cavazos again returned to the scene of the battle where he located and led another small group of men to safety. First Lieutenant Cavazos then made two more unassisted trips to the battlefield searching for missing soldiers. Not until he was personally satisfied that the battlefield was cleared on the morning of June 15, did he allow treatment of his own combat wounds sustained during the action. First Lieutenant Cavazos' conspicuous gallantry, extraordinary heroism, and intrepidity at the risk of his life, above and beyond the call of duty, are in keeping with the highest traditions of military service and reflect great credit upon himself, his unit, and the United States Army.

== Awards and Decorations ==
Cavazos's military awards include the Medal of Honor, Distinguished Service Cross, Army Distinguished Service Medal, two Silver Stars, Defense Superior Service Medal, two Legion of Merit awards, five Bronze Star Medals, the Purple Heart, the Combat Infantryman Badge, and the Parachutist Badge. Cavazos was also awarded an honorary lifetime membership in the National Guard Association of Texas; was inducted into the Fort Leavenworth Hall of Fame and Ranger Regiment Association Hall of Fame; and received the Doughboy Award of National Infantry Association, 1991.

Badge	Combat Infantryman Badge with Star denoting 2nd award		
1st row	Medal of Honor Upgraded from DSC, 2025		Distinguished Service Cross
2nd row	Army Distinguished Service Medal	Silver Star	Defense Superior Service Medal
3rd row	Legion of Merit with 1 Oak leaf cluster	Distinguished Flying Cross	Bronze Star Medal with "V" Device and 3 Oak leaf clusters
4th row	Bronze Star Medal 2nd ribbon required per Army regulation	Purple Heart	Meritorious Service Medal
5th row	Air Medal With "V" Device and Award numeral 9	Joint Service Commendation Medal	Army Commendation Medal
6th row	National Defense Service Medal with 1 Service star	Korean Service Medal with 4 Campaign stars	Vietnam Service Medal with 3 Campaign stars
7th row	Army Service Ribbon	Army Overseas Service Ribbon with Award numeral 2	Republic of Vietnam Gallantry Cross with Palm and 5/16 inch star
8th row	United Nations Service Medal Korea	Vietnam Campaign Medal	Korean War Service Medal Retroactively Awarded, 2003
Badge	Parachutist Badge		
Tab	Ranger Tab		
Unit awards	Valorous Unit Award		
Unit awards	Korean Presidential Unit Citation	Republic of Vietnam Gallantry Cross Unit Citation with Palm	Republic of Vietnam Civil Action Unit Citation 1st class with Palm

1st Row	National Order of Vietnam Knight		
2nd row	Army Distinguished Service Order 2nd Class	Order of National Security Merit Gukseon Medal	Order of Military Merit Grand Officer

== Naming of Fort Cavazos ==
The 2021 Defense Authorization Act directed the removal of names that "honor or commemorate the Confederate States of America." A goal of the Naming Commission is to inspire service members from diverse communities by giving military facilities "proud new names that are rooted in their local communities and that honor American heroes whose valor, courage, and patriotism exemplify the very best of the United States military."

On 25 May 2022, the Naming Commission recommended that Fort Hood be renamed to Fort Cavazos, in recognition of Cavazos's military service. Defense Secretary Lloyd Austin ordered the renaming on 6 October 2022. On July 28, 2025, Fort Cavazos was renamed Fort Hood.

== See also ==
- Borinqueneers Congressional Gold Medal
