= Coastal Bend College =

Community college in Texas, US

Coordinates: 28.4356°N 97.7567°W

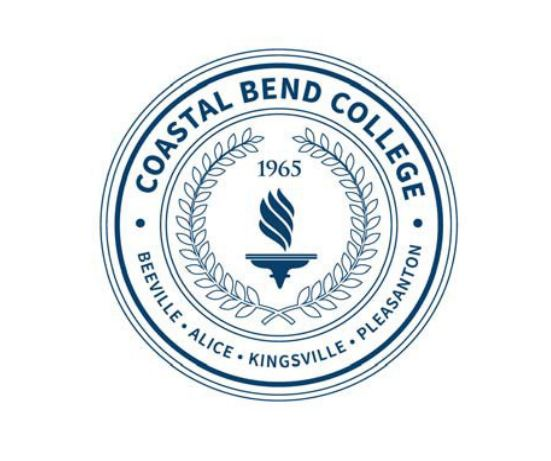
- Former name: Bee County College
- Motto: Success Happens Here
- Type: Public community college
- Established: 1965
- President: Zachary Z. Suarez
- Students: 4,105 (Fall 2021)
- Location: Beeville, Texas, United States
- Campus: Rural
- Colors: Bright blue and navy
- Mascot: Cougars
- Website: coastalbend.edu
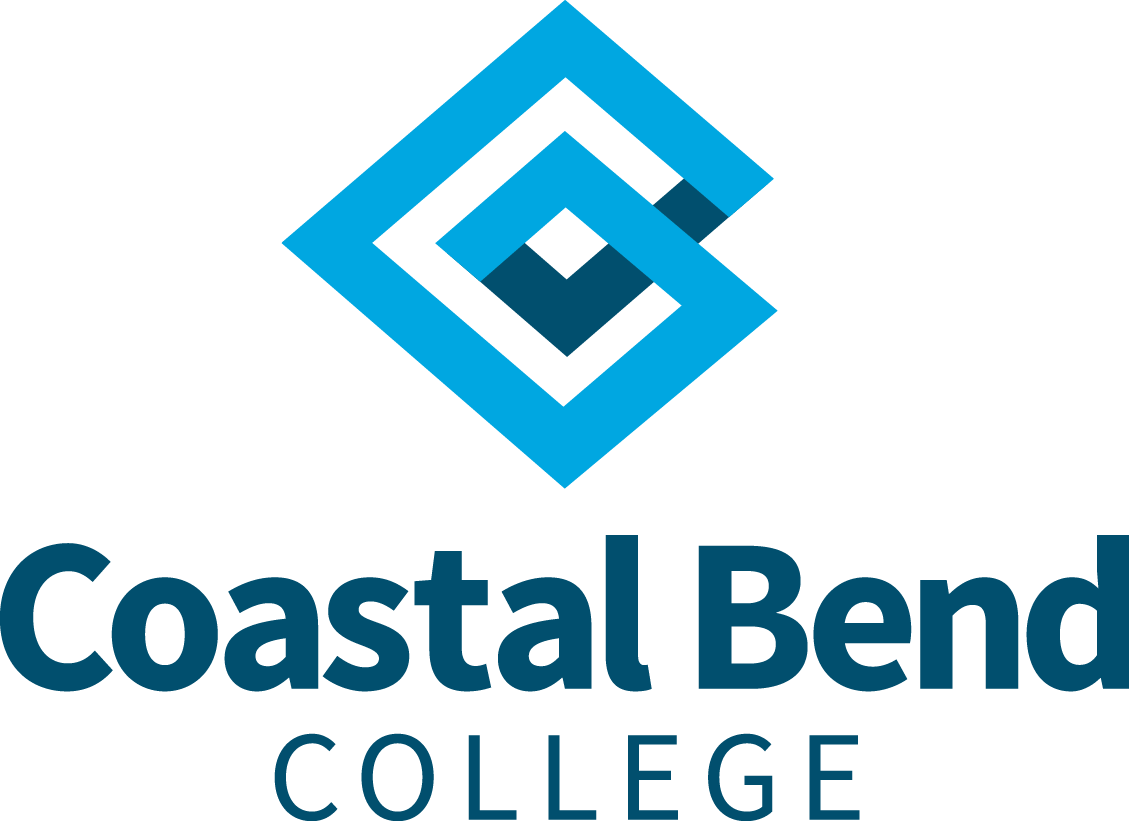

Coastal Bend College (CBC), formerly Bee County College, is a public community college that has its main campus in Beeville, Texas, and branch campuses in Alice, Kingsville, and Pleasanton, Texas.

As defined by the Texas Legislature, the official service area of CBC is:

- All of Bee, Brooks, Duval, Jim Wells, Karnes, Live Oak, and McMullen Counties,
- The Pleasanton Independent School District, located in Atascosa County, and
- The Kingsville, Ricardo, and Santa Gertrudis school districts, located within Kleberg County.

The school enrolled 4,105 students in academic, workforce education, and continuing education classes during the fall of 2021. The Beeville campus of CBC serves the educational needs of more than 1,248 students. The district serves a rural community of some 9,000 square miles (23,000 km^{2}).

== History ==
The Bee County Junior College District was created at an election on November 2, 1965. That election resulted from several years of study and work to establish a community college for Bee County. Support was shown in an overwhelming five-to-one majority for the creation of the district. The desire for a community college was demonstrated again on December 7, 1965, when district citizens approved a tax to support BCC, and to issue bonds to build the college.

The board of trustees selected Grady C. Hogue as the first BCC President. BCC opened in September 1967, with 790 students, 24 full-time instructors and 11 part-time teachers.

The board of trustees officially changed the college name from Bee County College to Coastal Bend College effective September 1, 1998. The name change was made because the service area was extended by an act of the Texas Legislature in 1995.

== Academics ==
The campus also offers hundreds of academic courses in 27 concentration areas, relatable to "majors", which are transferable to most four-year institutions.

== Branch campuses ==
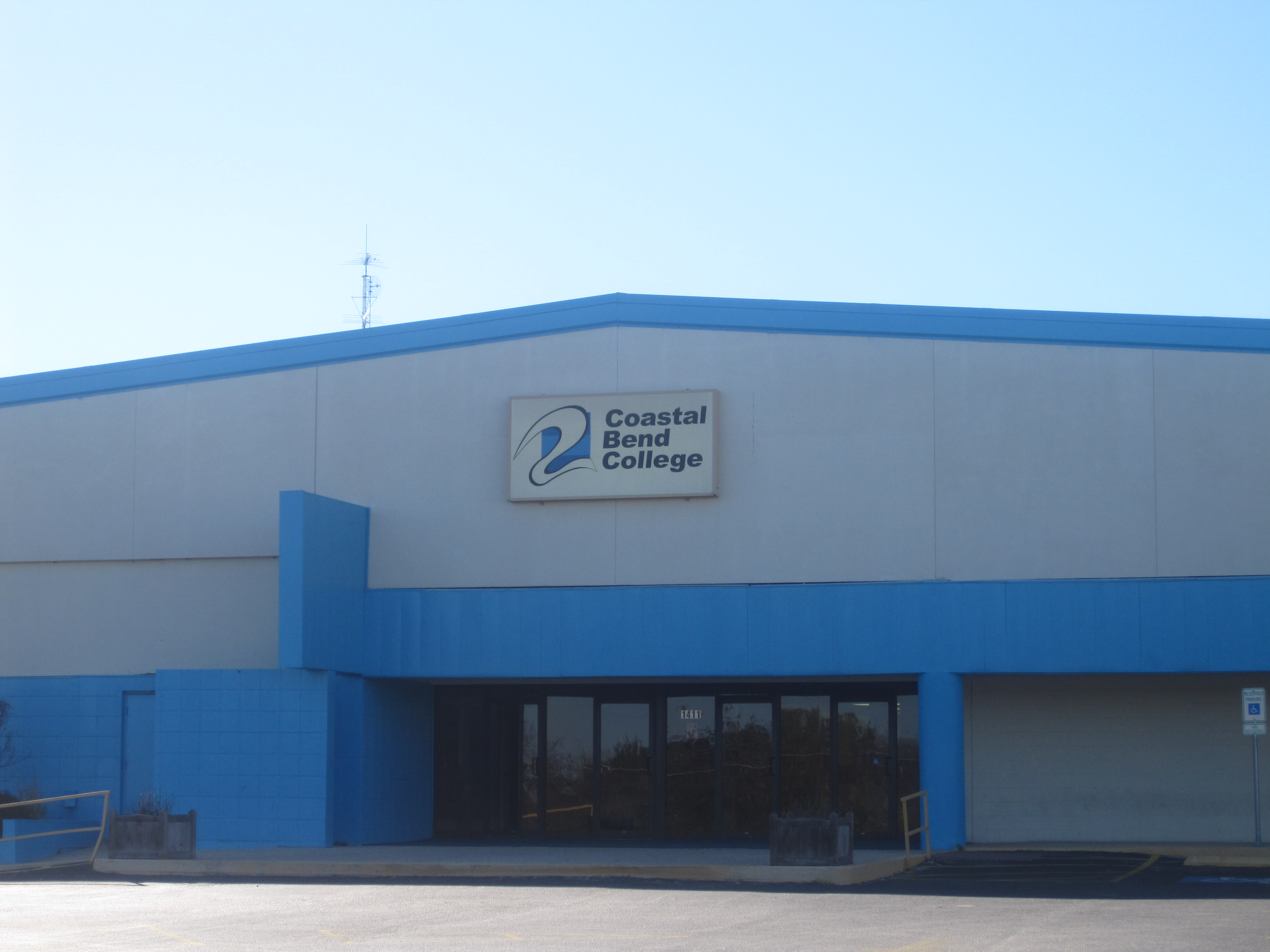
The Pleasanton - Atascosa County - campus of Coastal Bend College

Coastal Bend College has satellite campuses that operate conjunctively with the main campus, rather than independently like some other college systems. These locations offer a fraction of the programs that the main campus does, and students can move and attend classes between different campuses. Classes taken at any of the four CBC schools appear on the same transcript.

== Athletics ==
In 2006, the college reinstated a portion of its athletics program after years of absence from intramural competition. Coastal Bend College Cougars compete in National Junior College Athletic Association (NJCAA) Region 14 in men's basketball, soccer, and baseball, and women's basketball, softball, and volleyball.
