= Texas Animal Health Commission =

State agency of Texas

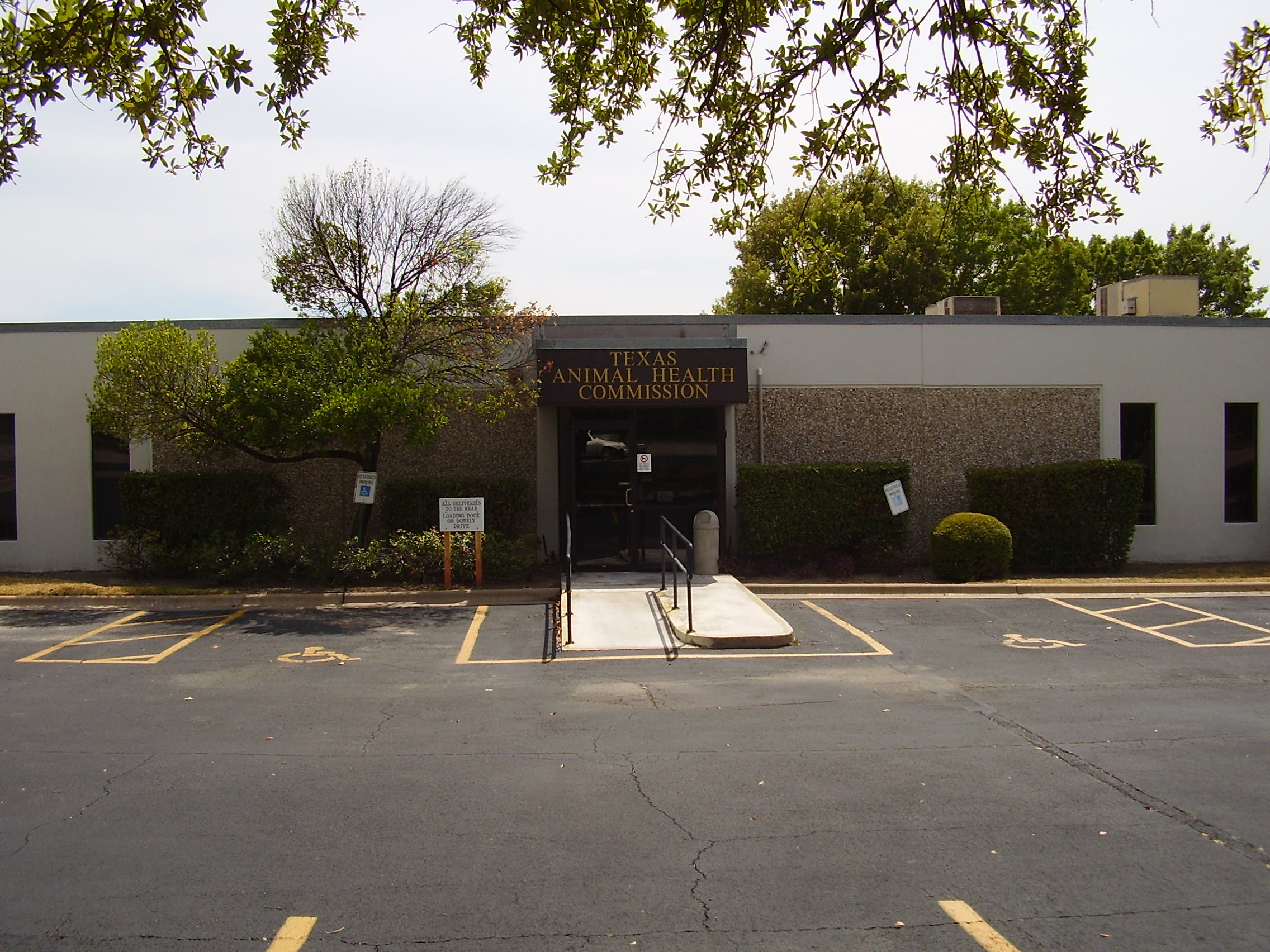
Texas Animal Health Commission offices, 2009

The Texas Animal Health Commission (TAHC) is a state agency of Texas. Its headquarters are located at 2105 Kramer Lane, in Austin, Texas. The commission exists to help protect the health of livestock within the state.

== History ==
One of Texas' oldest agencies, the TAHC was formed on April 20, 1893, and was named the Texas Livestock Sanitary Commission (TLLC) until 1959. It was created to find solutions to babesiosis, a bovine disease. Governor Jim Hogg funded it biannually, with $20,000. To eradicate babesiosis, the TAHC created regulations, which included quarantining infected cattle. Members Caesar and Robert J. Kleberg Jr. helped discover methods to stop its spread. By 1993, the quarantine area shrunk to 1,200 square miles (3,100 km^{2}).

Alongside the United States Department of Agriculture (USDA), it helped end bovine tuberculosis, in Texas c. 1917. Throughout its existence, it also stopped the spread foot-and-mouth disease in 1924. Eradicated Cochliomyia and classical swine fever from Texas, and brought the infection of equine infectious anemia from 750 to 25, from 1997 to 2017. In the 2000s, it successfully advocated for the recognition of several livestock diseases by the USDA.

== Organization ==
At its inception, the TAHC had three commissioners, and a veterinarian, the salary of whom was capped at $10 per day. The number of members increased to six in 1955, to nine in 1973, and to twelve in 1983. The members were unpaid.

As of 2021, the TAHC is operated by thirteen commissioners, who serve six-year staggered terms. It is divided between six regions: Amarillo, Beeville, Laredo, Rockdale, Stephenville, and Sulphur Springs, which are overseen by the executive director, known as the 'State Veterinarian'.
