= Donald R. Haragan =

American academic

12th President of Texas Tech University
- In office 1996–2000
- Preceded by: Robert W. Lawless
- Succeeded by: David J. Schmidly

Personal details
- Born: April 15, 1936 (age 90) Houston, Texas, U.S.
- Education: University of Texas at Austin; Texas A&M University

Donald Robert Haragen (born April 15, 1936) is an American academic. He served as president of Texas Tech University from 1996 to 2000. He is a professor in the Department of Geosciences. Haragan earned his Ph.D. at the University of Texas at Austin in 1969 in civil engineering, a master's degree in meteorology from Texas A&M University, and a Bachelor of Science degree from the University of Texas at Austin in 1969.
