= Kingsville Independent School District =

School district in Texas, United States

Address
- 207 North Third Street Kingsville, TX, 78363; United States

District information
- Grades: PK–12
- Schools: 5
- NCES District ID: 4825680

Students and staff
- Students: 2,603 (2023–2024)
- Teachers: 185.27 (on an FTE basis)
- Student–teacher ratio: 14.05:1

Other information
- Website: www.kingsvilleisd.com

Kingsville Independent School District is a public school district based in Kingsville, Texas (USA).

In 2009 the school district was rated "academically acceptable" by the Texas Education Agency.

== Schools ==
Secondary

- Henrietta M. King Early College High School (Grades 9–12)
- Memorial Middle School (Grades 7–8)

Primary

- Gillett Intermediate School (Grades 5–6)
- Grades PreK–4:
  - N.M. Harrel Elementary School
  - A.D. Harvey Elementary School
  - Alice G.K. Kleberg Elementary School
  - Jesus R. Perez Elementary School

Former buildings

- Flato Elementary School - Built in 1924. Used as a "Family Involvement Center" prior to 2010. Vacant after 2010.
