= Holly Springs Female Institute =

The Holly Springs Female Institute was an early female seminary for white women, founded in Holly Springs, Mississippi in 1836.

By 1838 the school had over 80 students and owned two pianos. The state of Mississippi granted the school a charter in 1839, at which time it had five faculty members including the Rev. C. Parish, president of the school. The charter was, evidently in error, assigned to the "Holly Springs Female Academy."

By 1839, the school had a permanent building in the Greek Revival style.

In 1841 the confusion over the name encouraged an Episcopalian clergyman named C. A. Foster to open a rival school also called the Holly Springs Female Institute. In early 1842, for reasons that are not clear, Foster replaced Parish as president of the original school.

Holly Springs offered advanced academics, with a focus on the liberal arts instead of traditionally feminine subjects like home economics. Students were required to participate in public examinations, rather than demonstrating competency through written examinations or term papers. Instruction of the Italian language, which experienced increased popularity in the U.S. in the mid-1800s, was among the subjects offered. Although the curriculum was of high quality, girls as young as 10 years old were admitted.

The school building was used as a hospital during the Civil War. The building was destroyed by the Union Army in 1864 and the school was unable to reopen.

== See also ==
- Women's colleges in the United States
- Timeline of women's colleges in the United States
