= Lauro Cavazos =

American educator and politician (1927–2022)

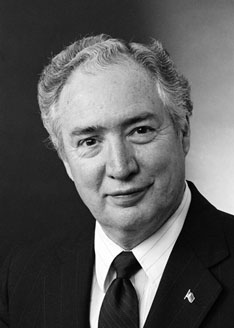
- Cavazos in 1988

4th United States Secretary of Education
- In office September 20, 1988 – December 12, 1990
- President: Ronald Reagan; George H. W. Bush
- Preceded by: William Bennett
- Succeeded by: Lamar Alexander

10th President of Texas Tech University
- In office 1980–1988
- Preceded by: Lawrence Graves (interim)
- Succeeded by: Robert W. Lawless

Personal details
- Born: Lauro Fred Cavazos; January 4, 1927 Kingsville, Texas, U.S.
- Died: March 15, 2022 (aged 95) Concord, Massachusetts, U.S.
- Party: Democratic
- Spouse: Peggy Ann Murdock
- Children: 10
- Parents: Lauro F. Cavazos Sr. (father); Tomasa (Quintanilla) Cavazos (mother)
- Relatives: descendant of Francita Alavez; Richard E. Cavazos (brother)
- Education: Texas Tech University (BS, MS); Iowa State University (PhD)

Military service
- Allegiance: United States
- Branch/service: United States Army
- Years of service: 1944—1946

Lauro Fred Cavazos Jr. (January 4, 1927 – March 15, 2022) was an American educator and politician. He served as the United States Secretary of Education and was the first Hispanic to serve in the United States Cabinet.

== Early life and education ==
A sixth-generation Texan, Cavazos was born on the King Ranch near Kingsville, Texas, and was the son of Lauro F. Cavazos Sr. and Tomasa (Quintanilla) Cavazos. His father served as foreman of the showcase Santa Gertrudis cattle division. Through his maternal ancestry, he was a descendant of Texas Revolution heroine Francita Alavez, the "Angel of Goliad".

Cavazos enlisted in the United States Army in 1944 and served state-side in an infantry unit in the waning days of World War II. He was the brother of U.S. Army General Richard E. Cavazos.

Shortly after his discharge from the Army, Cavazos enrolled at Texas College of Arts and Industries (currently Texas A&M University–Kingsville), majoring in journalism. He later transferred to Texas Technological College (currently Texas Tech University) where he earned B.A. and M.A. degrees in zoology in 1949 and 1951 respectively,. He later earned a Ph.D. in physiology in 1954 from Iowa State University (ISU) in Ames, Iowa. While in college, he was a member of Kappa Kappa Psi.

== Career ==
Following a stint on the faculties of Tufts University and the Medical College of Virginia, Cavazos served as Dean of the Tufts University School of Medicine from 1975 to 1980. From 1980 to 1988, he served as President of Texas Tech University.

A Democrat, Cavazos served as Secretary of Education from August 1988 to December 1990 during the Republican Reagan and George H. W. Bush administrations. He was confirmed by the Senate in a 94-0 vote. He resigned in December 1990.

Following his resignation as Secretary of Education, he returned to the faculty of Tufts University where he served as Professor of Public Health and Family Medicine.

=== Awards ===
In 2006, his alma mater Iowa State University awarded him the Distinguished Achievement Award, their highest honors.

== Personal life ==
Cavazos was married to the former Peggy Ann Murdock; they had ten children and lived in Massachusetts. He died in Concord, Massachusetts, on March 15, 2022, at the age of 95.

== Bibliography ==
- — (19 February 2008). A Kineño Remembers: From the King Ranch to the White House. Texas A&M University Press. pp. 113–114. ISBN 978-1603440448. LCCN 2005034155. OCLC 62509065. OL 37108732M.
- —; Preuss, Gene B. (6 June 2016). A Kineño's Journey: On Family, Learning, and Public Service. Texas Tech University Press. ISBN 978-0896729681. LCCN 2016017176. OCLC 951172368. OL 29322303M.

Political offices
Preceded by Bill Bennett	United States Secretary of Education; 1988–1990	Succeeded by Lamar Alexander
Academic offices
Preceded by Lawrence Graves; Interim	President of Texas Tech University; 1980–1988	Succeeded by Robert W. Lawless
