= King Ranch =

Largest ranch in the United States

- U.S. National Register of Historic Places
- U.S. National Historic Landmark District
- King Ranch logo - the running W brand

- Location within Texas Location within the United States
- Nearest city: Kingsville, Texas
- Coordinates: 27°31′7″N 97°55′1″W
- Area: 825,000 acres (334,000 ha)
- Built: 1852
- NRHP reference No.: 66000820

Significant dates
- Added to NRHP: October 15, 1966
- Designated NHLD: November 5, 1961

The King Ranch is the largest ranch in the United States, comprising some 825,000 acres (3,340 km^{2}; 1,289 sq mi). It is mainly a cattle ranch, but has also produced racehorses.

The headquarters of the King Ranch are in an office building in Houston, Texas. The ranch itself is located in South Texas between Corpus Christi and Brownsville, adjacent to Kingsville. It was founded in 1853 by Captain Richard King and Gideon K. Lewis. It includes parts of six Texas counties: most of Kleberg, much of Kenedy, and parts of Brooks, Jim Wells, Nueces, and Willacy counties.

The ranch consists of four divisions of land: Santa Gertrudis, Laureles, Encino, and Norias. The Santa Gertrudis and Laureles divisions share a short length of border, and the Encino and Norias divisions are both entirely separate. The ranch was designated a National Historic Landmark in 1961. The Texas Cowboy Hall of Fame inducted the ranch in 2019. The King Ranch was one of the first ranches to be added to the National Register of Historic Places on October 15, 1966, because of the National Historic Preservation Act of 1966 which was signed that same day.

== History ==
Richard King (1824–1885) was a river pilot, born in New York City to Irish immigrants. He was indentured to a jeweler at age 11, but later ran to sea, eventually attaining a pilot's rating. In 1843, King first met his future business partner in the King Ranch, Mifflin Kenedy (1818–1895), captain of the steamboat Champion. Both served under General Zachary Taylor (later the 12th US president), operating steamboats from Brazos Santiago Harbor in Texas, USA, to Matamoros in Mexico, and on up river to Camargo, Tamaulipas, in support of the U.S. invasion of Monterrey and Saltillo. After the Mexican–American War, King made a good living hauling merchandise on the Rio Grande, as far up river as Camargo, and Rio Grande City. In the meantime, Kenedy was able to make money by carrying goods overland into Mexico. By March 1, 1850, King, Kenedy, Charles Stillman, founder of Brownsville, and James O'Donnell entered into a business partnership (M. Kenedy & Co.) to transport Stillman's goods from Brazos Santiago Harbor on the Gulf of Mexico and up the Rio Grande. The enterprise required two types of steamers—the Grampus and Comanche. During the American Civil War, the steamboat fleet was reflagged under the name of the Matamoros, Mexico citizen Francisco Iturria and the Mexican flag. As Mexico was a neutral country, the steamboats could not be stopped by Union blockaders, and engaged in a lively commerce of transporting Texas cotton to many deep-water ships anchored offshore Matamoros, on the Mexican side of the Rio Grande. Stillman sold his share of the enterprise after the Civil War; the new firm operated as King, Kenedy & Co. until 1874.

King first saw the land that would become part of the King Ranch in April 1852 as he traveled north from Brownsville to attend the Lone Star Fair in Corpus Christi, a four-day trip by horseback. After a grueling ride, King caught sight of the Santa Gertrudis Creek, 124 mi (200 km) from the Rio Grande. It was the first stream he had seen on the Wild Horse Desert. The land, which was shaded by large mesquite trees, so impressed him, when he arrived at the fair, he and a friend, Texas Ranger Captain Gideon K. "Legs" Lewis, agreed then and there to make it into a ranch.

The King Ranch LK brand, still in use today, stands for partners Lewis and King.

King and Lewis established a cow camp on Santa Gertrudis Creek. During this time, Richard King purchased the Rincón de Santa Gertrudis grant, a 15,500 acres (63 km^{2}; 24.2 sq mi) holding that encompassed present-day Kingsville, Texas. It was purchased from the heirs of Juan Mendiola of Camargo on July 25, 1853, for $300. King sold Lewis an undivided half-interest in the land for $2,000. At the same time, Lewis sold King undivided half-interest in the ranchos of Manuel Barrera and of Juan Villareal for the same sum, on November 14, 1853. In 1854, King and Lewis purchased the de la Garza Santa Gertrudis grant from Praxides Uribe of Matamoros for $1,800, on the condition of a perfected title (complete documentation of the land grant) on May 20, 1854, to 53,000 acres (210 km^{2}; 83 sq mi). As the years passed, more land was added, growing to 1.2 million acres (1,875 sq mi, 4,900 km^{2}) at its largest extent, until reaching its current total.

In 1855, Lewis was killed by the husband of a woman with whom he had been having an affair. On July 1, 1856, a court sale of Lewis' property (including the undivided half-interest in the land of the Ranch) was held. King had arranged for Major W. W. Chapman (died 1859) to bid on the Rincón property, which Chapman acquired for $1,575. Chapman had been the quartermaster of Fort Brown in Brownsville, and regulated the steamboat contracts to supply Fort Ringgold, up river in Rio Grande City.

King interested Captain James Walworth in acquiring the entire de la Garza grant, and Walworth completed the purchase on December 26, 1856, for $5,000 paid to Praxides Uribe. King thus retained operational control of the Ranch, with Walworth as a silent partner who held title to the land, and who paid taxes on it.

King and Walworth's livestock brand was registered June 27, 1859, along with his earlier brands. (see below)

When King and his partners began hiring people to staff the ranch, they hired a number of Mexican hands. In one notable case, King traveled to the village of Cruillas, Tamaulipas, Mexico in the early months of 1854 (the village having been decimated by a severe drought) and purchased the village's entire cattle population. But shortly after leaving the village, King realized that by solving the village's short-term problem, by providing needed income to survive the drought, he had created a longer-term one by removing its source of future income. King thus returned to Cruillas and offered the villagers the opportunity to work for him, in exchange for food, shelter, and income. Many of the villagers accepted King's offer and relocated to Texas. As the ranch grew, these workers came to be called kineños, or "King's men". Over time, some original grantees returned to their land. King once said he "could not have kept on and held on if Andrés Canales had not been adjoining."

Records show a Mexican range cow cost $6 in 1854, a mustang horse cost $6, and a stud horse cost $200–300. In sum, in 1854, King paid $12,275.79. Lea estimated the 1855 expenses were smaller. The first brand was the ere flecha (an R with arrow through it).

In 1859, the ranch recorded its first official brands (HK and LK). In 1869, the ranch registered its "Running W" brand, which remains the King Ranch's official mark today. At the time, the ranch grazed cattle, horses, sheep and goats. By the mid-1870s, though, the ranch's hallmark stock had become the hardy Texas Longhorn. The ranch also boasted several Brahman bulls, as well as Beef Shorthorns and Herefords.

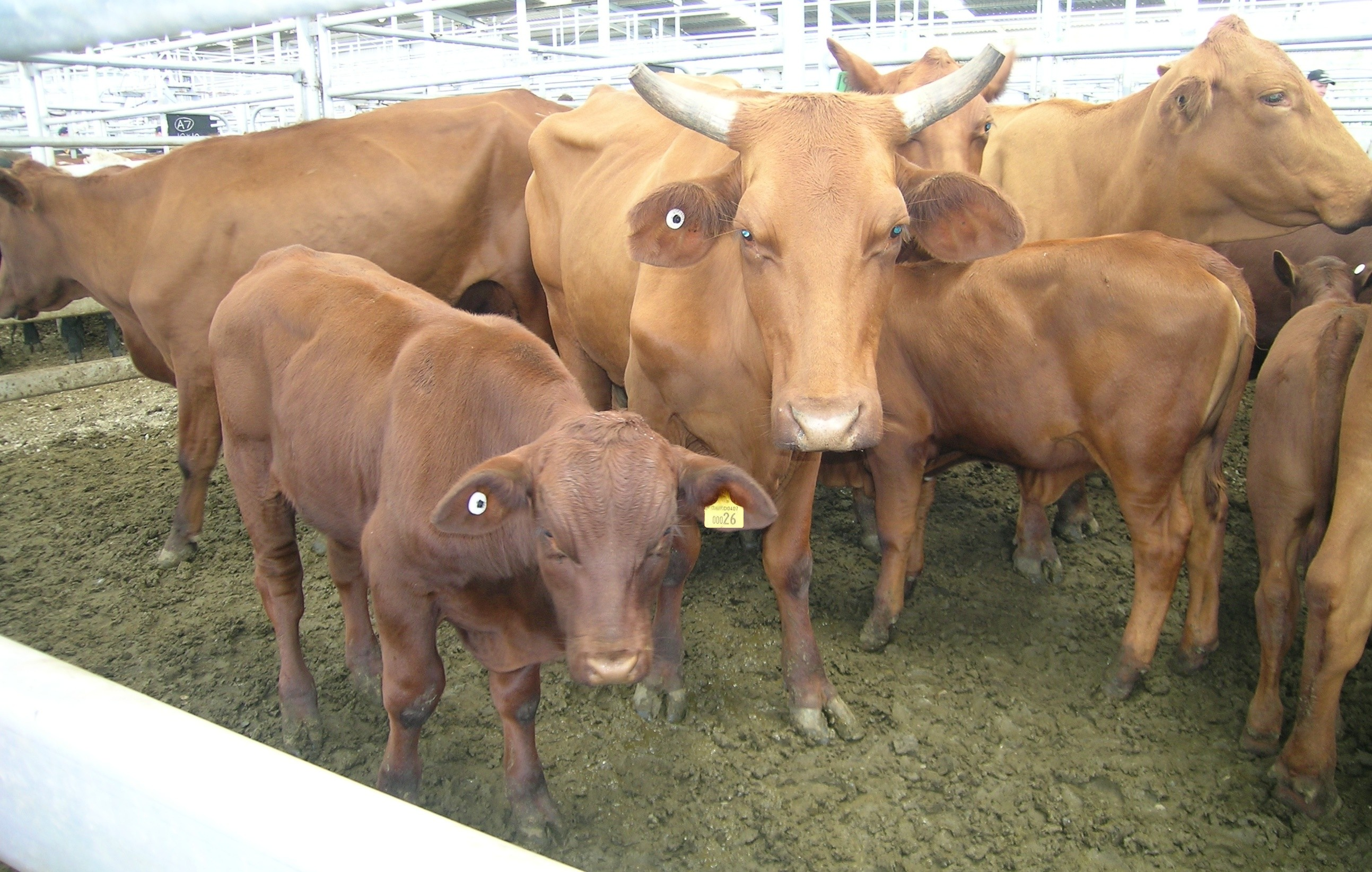
Santa Gertrudis cows and calves

The Brahmans, which were native to South Asia, were well adapted to thrive in South Texas' hot climate; they were crossed with the ranch's Beef Shorthorns to produce the ranch's own trademark stock—the Santa Gertrudis cattle, which were recognized as a breed in 1940.

Lea portrays King's purchase of the Ranch as motivated by his wooing of Henrietta Maria Morse Chamberlain (1832–1925), whom he married in the First Presbyterian Church, Brownsville, on Sunday, December 10, 1854. The King Ranch HK livestock brand stands for Henrietta King.

During the United States Civil War, the disruption of the flow of cattle to market initially caused a drop in beef prices. In 1861, the price of cattle dropped to $2 per head, but it rose again to $11 per head by August 1862.

The 1863-1864 winter pushed uncounted cattle south toward the Nueces River and Rio Grande. After the Civil War, the Texas Rangers were disbanded during the reconstruction of the United States. It became very tempting and low-risk to simply herd cattle across the Nueces or Rio Grande.

Even in this time of loss, by 1869, King was able to round up 48,664 of an estimated 84,000 head of cattle. Allowing for 10,000 remaining, King claimed a loss of 33,827 head from 1869 to 1872. To handle depredations (rustling), the ranchers formed the Stock Raisers Association of Western Texas in 1870; Mifflin Kenedy led the first meeting. By 1874, the Texas Rangers were re-established, and were a factor in controlling the depredations.

By 1870, 300,000 head of cattle made their way from the West to the railroads of Kansas, and thence to the stockyards of Chicago. On a Texas ranch, a steer worth $11 would bring $20 from a buyer in Abilene. The buyer in turn could ask $31.50 at the Union Stock Yards. King could drive his cattle for a hundred days to the railheads of Kansas.

By 1871, though, 700,000 head of cattle caused a market glut, which King avoided by personal negotiation in Abilene.

King managed to avoid the September 19, 1873, 'Black Friday panic' by selling early. During the lean year that followed, King continued to fence his land, and manage his cattle, horses, and sheep.

One technique King used to manage costs was to make his trail bosses the owners of the herd. The bosses would sign a note for the cattle, which they would begin to drive to market in February of each year, for the 100-day drive. The bosses were also the employers of the outfit. Upon the sale of the herd to the northern buyers, the trail bosses could relieve their indebtedness, and earn a profit greater than their ordinary wages.

Richard King died in 1885. At the death of Henrietta King in 1925, the ranch totaled 1.2 million acres that were divided among her heirs. Henrietta King's sole surviving child, Alice Gertrudis Kleberg, and her husband Robert J. Kleberg Jr. inherited over 800,000 acres that were incorporated as the King Ranch in 1934. The appraiser's Statement of Gross Estate, Mrs. H. M. King listed a net total of $5.4 million, as the owner of 997,444.56 acres (4,036.5 km^{2}), which did not include the Santa Gertrudis headquarters, nor did it include the Kleberg's Stillman and Lasater tracts, which were not of the estate. Her son-in-law, Robert J. Kleberg Jr., said "A valuation of four to five dollars an acre ($1236/km^{2}) on a million acres (4000 km^{2}) of raw ranchland was about right, but it took a long time for the Government to admit it." By 1929, the taxes ($859,000) had been paid up, in installments, but the trustees had to borrow money, so by the market crash of 1929, Henrietta King's estate was in debt $3,000,000.

Robert Justus Kleberg Jr. and Alice Gertrudis King had five children, including a son named Robert J. Kleberg III. In 1933, Robert J. Kleberg, III leased the exploration and drilling rights on the ranch to Humble Oil of Houston, Texas, for $127,824, in exchange for the usual royalty of 1/8th of the sale price for all oil and gas produced from the property. Humble Oil loaned enough money to pay the debts of the H.M. King estate, secured by a first mortgage on the land. Humble struck oil and gas by 1939. During all of this, the Ranch was a going concern, with a net profit of $227,382, as early as 1926. Robert Kleberg III was married to Helen Campbell, and together they had a daughter they named Helen.

Lauro Cavazos, who served as the first Hispanic United States Cabinet officer, was born on the King Ranch during his father's service as a ranch foreman in January 1927.

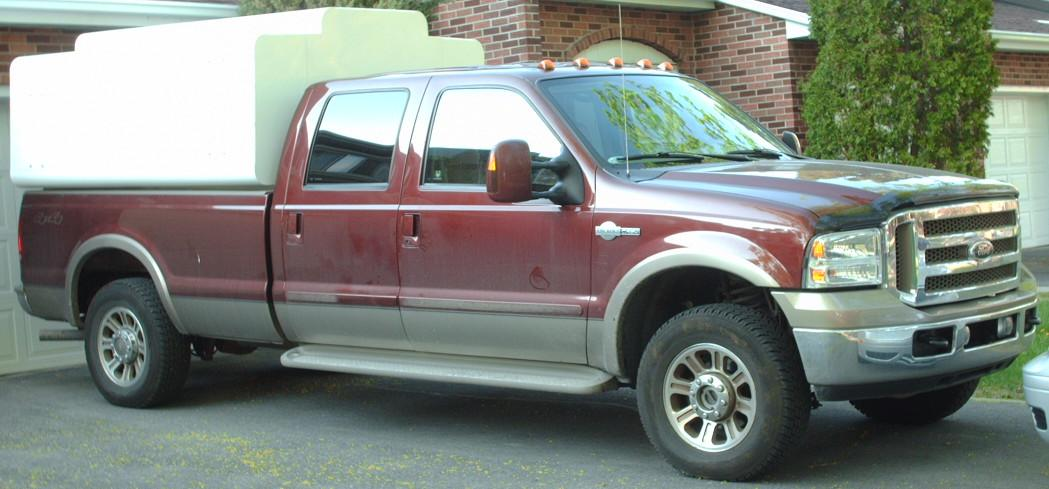
Example of a King Ranch; a Ford F-250 (2005–2007)

On November 18, 1936, Luther Blanton and his son, John, trespassed on the ranch by crawling through the fence surrounding it. They had intended to hunt ducks and nearby residents reported hearing shots fired. Shortly thereafter, locals organized a group to force their way onto the ranch around the area where they were known to have gone hunting. However, neither Blanton nor his son were ever seen again. A subsequent police investigation resulted in no arrests. Although most residents suspected them being murdered by ranch guards for trespassing, it remains a long-standing unsolved mystery.

During World War II, the Navy purchased lots of land to construct the Kingsville Naval Outlying Fields to support naval flight training. Many of these airfields have since been demolished and reverted to farmland.

In February 1961, National Geographic reported that the ranch covered 980,000 acres.

In 1999 (since the 2001 model year to present), Ford began using the King Ranch brand on its vehicles. Over the years there have been King Ranch versions of the F-150, Super Duty, Explorer, and Expedition. They include dark brown leather seats, and the badges show the King Ranch 'Running W' brand.

== Education ==
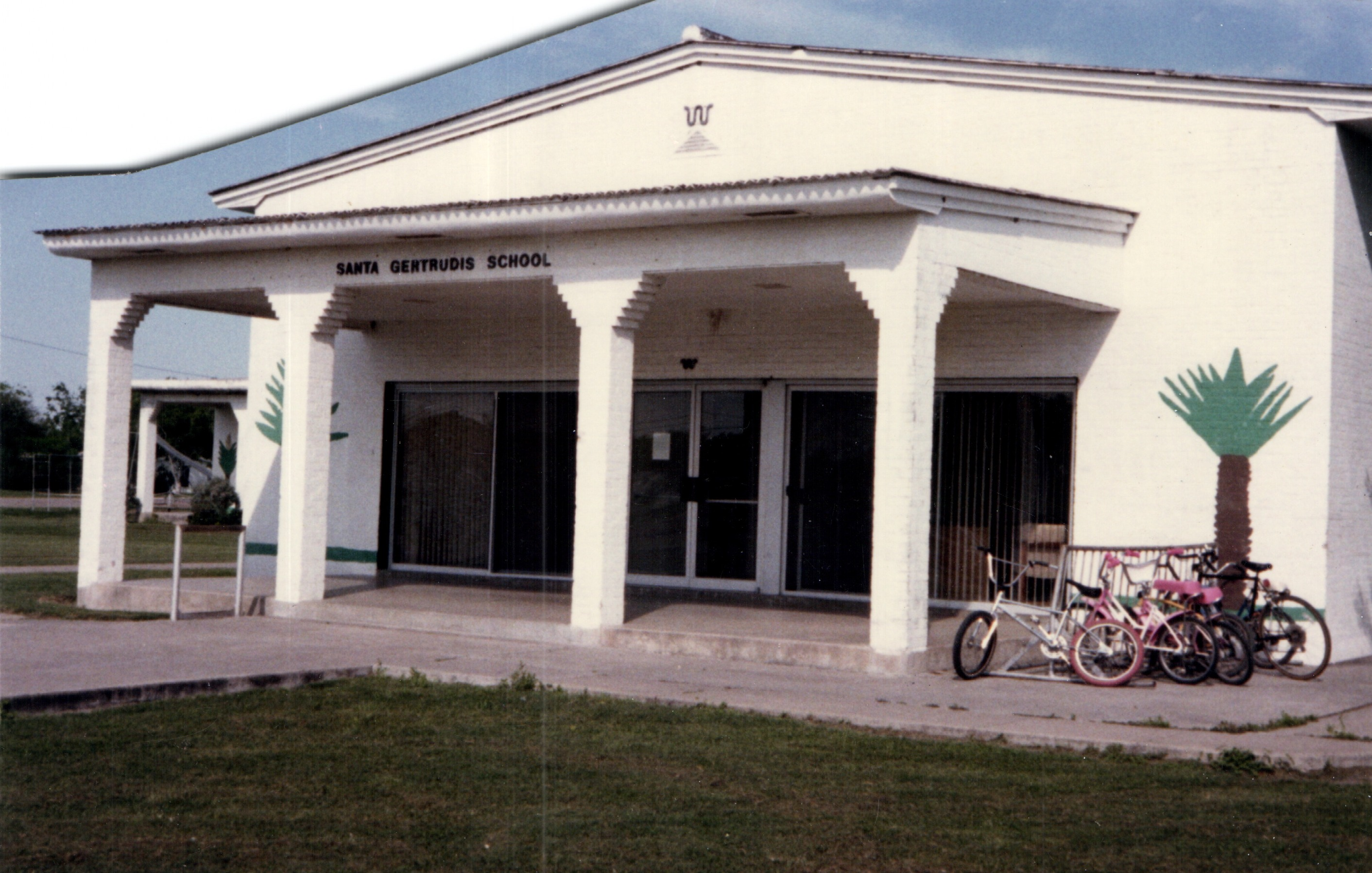
Santa Gertrudis School in 1987

Santa Gertrudis Independent School District's original elementary and middle school facility, built in 1917, was leased from the King Ranch and located on ranch property (the Santa Gertrudis portion). It was a 25,209-square-foot (2,342.0 m^{2}), 13 classroom complex with a classroom building, four annexes, two storage structures, and a gymnasium that had the possibility of being used for other reasons. The district now has a new campus designed by PBK Architects.

Under Texas law, the Santa Gertrudis ISD area is in the boundary of Coastal Bend College (referred to in legislation under its former name, "Bee County College").

== In popular culture ==
Edna Ferber's novel Giant, which was turned into a film of the same name, takes place on the King Ranch. The film and novel depict several events in the ranch's history, such as the discovery of oil on the property.

Forever Texas, the 2022 historical western novel by bestselling authors William W. Johnstone and J.A. Johnstone, is based on the true story of the founding of the King Ranch.

In the James Michener novel Centennial, the Venneford Ranch was said to be patterned after the King Ranch.

The historical fiction novel Lords of the Land by Matt Braun is based on the King Ranch and its founder, although names and some circumstance have been altered.

A cowboy's perspective on the King Ranch subsidiary in Australia, the cattle station Brunette Downs, is captured in the 2012 autobiography by Nick Campbell-Jones Don't Die Wondering. Campbell-Jones was a jackaroo (Australian cowboy) who started at Brunette Downs in 1963 and worked his way up to overseer and assistant manager before leaving in 1975.

== See also ==
- Anna Creek Station
- List of ranches and stations
- List of the largest stations in Australia

== Footnotes ==
- Lea, p. 2: For King's biographical details, Lea cites Richard King's sworn deposition before F.J. Parker, U.S. Commissioner, Eastern District of Texas, April 11, 1870, filed with the U.S. and Mexican Claims Commission, Washington, D.C., August 30, 1870.—Records of Boundary and Claims Commission and Arbitrations, Claims vs. Mexico - 1868, Claim No. 579, RG 76 GSA, National Archives and Records Services, Washington, D.C.
- Lea, pp128–9. Notes from the King Ranch vault in Henrietta King's handwriting.
- ,: Reminiscences by Henrietta King to members of her family.
