= Richard King (entrepreneur) =

American entrepreneur (1824–1885)

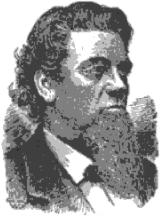
- Born: July 10, 1824; New York City
- Died: April 14, 1885 (aged 60); San Antonio, Texas
- Occupation: Rancher
- Known for: Founder of King Ranch
- Spouse: Henrietta King
- Children: 5 including Alice Gertrudis King Kleberg, the namesake of Alice, Texas

Richard King (July 10, 1824 – April 14, 1885) was a riverboat captain, Confederate, entrepreneur, and most notably, the founder of the King Ranch in South Texas, which at the time of his death in 1885 encompassed over 825,000 acres (3,340 km^{2}).

== Early years ==
Born in New York City on July 10, 1824 into a poor Irish family, King was indentured as an apprentice to a jeweler in Manhattan at the age of 9. In 1835, he ran away from his indenture, stowing away on a ship bound for Mobile, Alabama. Upon discovery, he was adopted into the crew and trained in navigation, becoming a steamboat pilot by the age of sixteen. While serving in the end of the Second Seminole War in 1842, he met Mifflin Kenedy, who would later become his partner. From 1842 to 1847, King would operate steamboats on the Apalachicola and Chattahoochee rivers, in Florida and Georgia.

== Riverboating ==
During the Mexican-American War, King's friend and subsequent ranching and steam boating partner, Mifflin Kenedy, enlisted as ship master. Having run men and supplies to the United States Army along the Rio Grande. Kenedy convinced King in 1846 to join the war effort along the Rio Grande, where King worked on the transport Colonel Cross, ferrying army supplies between Reynosa, Camargo, and Matamoros. In 1850, following the war, King, Kenedy and two other partners formed the M. Kenedy and Company steamboat firm, renamed in 1866 to King, Kenedy and Company when the two other partners were bought out. This firm achieved "nearly monopolistic" control on the Rio Grande for most of the years between 1850 and 1874, when the partnership was dissolved.

== American Civil War ==
In addition to selling cattle to the Confederacy for food, King was active in the Cotton Road trade route during the Civil War which sold Confederate cotton through Mexico. King profited from both cotton road caravans stopping in King Ranch for supplies, and from steamboats operating under Mexican registry transporting cotton to Mexico and returning to Texas with military supplies.

An entry in James Marten's book Slaves and Rebels: The Peculiar Institution in Texas, 1861-1865, confirms there were slaves on the King Ranch noting that "When Union troops invaded South Texas and tried to entice slaves away from the King Ranch, a Houston newspaper proudly reported, they 'remained with their mistress ... proving true to the last.'"

When the Union army invaded Texas to stop the Cotton Road trade, King participated in shifting the Cotton Road to Laredo. After the Battle of Brownsville, King Ranch was attacked by Union troops Christmastime 1863 by 80 men led by Captain James Speed. King was warned and fled the ranch house, leaving his family under the care of ranch hand Francisco Alvarado. When troops fired on the house, Alvarado was killed attempting to warn the soldiers that there were women and children inside. The troops searched the property for King, vandalized the house and took the ranch hands as prisoners.

King continued to work the cotton trade throughout the war, and stayed in Matamoros, Mexico waiting to see if his request for amnesty from the President was approved. He acquired letters of amnesty and returned to Texas July 14, 1865.

== Founding the King Ranch ==
As soon as King had arrived in Texas, he began speculating in land, beginning with lots in Brownsville, Texas and Cameron County, Texas, and continued investing the large profits from the riverboat firm. In 1852, King purchased a false title to the southern half of Padre Island. That same year, he traveled overland from Brownsville to Corpus Christi, and became fascinated with the grasslands along Santa Gertrudis Creek in the "Nueces Strip" (the land between the Nueces River and the Rio Grande). In 1853 and 1854 King began land acquisitions in the region of the creek, purchasing valid titles to two ranches of a combined 68,500 acres (277 km^{2}), forming the nucleus of the King Ranch. He continued acquiring land until his death in 1885, when the ranch had 614,000 acres (2,480 km^{2}).

== Family ==
King married Henrietta Chamberlain in 1854. The couple had five children: Henrietta Maria (1856 – 1917), Ella Morse (1858 – 1900), Nathan Richard (1860 – 1922), Alice Gertrudis (1862 – 1944) and Robert E. Lee (1864 – 1883).

== Death ==
In 1885, in obvious poor health, King traveled to San Antonio to see his doctor. He died of stomach cancer on April 14, at the Menger Hotel.

== Legacy ==
The King Ranch continues to be a dominant economic force in the region. The town of Kingsville, Texas is named for King. Corpus Christi has a high school named for King. In 1959, he was inducted into the Hall of Great Westerners of the National Cowboy & Western Heritage Museum.

== Bibliography ==
- Captain King of Texas: The man who made the King Ranch, Tom Lea, 1957, Atlantic Monthly Press.
- Richard King: Texas Cattle Rancher, William R. Sanford, Carl R. Green, 1997, Enslow Publishers. ISBN 0-89490-673-9
- "The Last Empire", William Broyles, Texas Monthly, October 1980
