= Melinda Rankin =

American missionary, teacher, and writer (1811–1888)

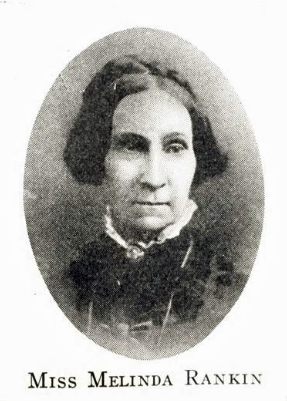
- Born: March 21, 1811; Littleton, New Hampshire, U.S.
- Died: December 1888 (aged 77); Bloomington, Illinois, U.S.
- Resting place: Evergreen Cemetery, Bloomington, Illinois
- Occupations: Presbyterian missionary; teacher; writer
- Writing career
- Language: English
- Genres: History; memoir
- Subject: Missionary work

Melinda Rankin (March 21, 1811 – December 6/7, 1888) was an American Presbyterian missionary, teacher, and writer. Born in New England, she found her life work in Mexico, opening the first Protestant mission in Mexico in 1866. She described her experiences in a memoir, Twenty Years Among the Mexicans, A Narrative of Missionary Labor (1875). Rankin also established the first bilingual school in Texas, the Rio Grande Female Institute.

== Early life and education ==
Melinda Rankin was born on March 21, 1811, in Littleton, New Hampshire. Her parents were Brigadier Gen. David Rankin (1783–1852), of Littleton, and Persis (Daniel) Rankin (d. 1854). David was born in New Hampshire, of Scotch parents, James Rankin and Margaret Wetherspoon Rankin, who had emigrated to the United States in 1776, settling in Thornton, New Hampshire. David and Persis married in 1808. Melinda's sisters – Clarissa, Mabina, Harriet, and Persis – all became teachers. Additional siblings included Elona, Chastina, David, Emily, and Ellen.

Rankin received a good education, and was converted to Christianity at an early age. Almost from girlhood, she consecrated herself to a missionary's life.

== Career ==
Rankin began teaching at age fourteen.

=== Kentucky and Mississippi ===
In 1840, a call was made for missionary teachers to go to the Mississippi Valley. European immigration brought great numbers of Roman Catholics into that portion of the country, and American Protestantism made appeals for counteracting influences. To this call, Rankin responded, and went as far as Kentucky, where she remained for two years, establishing schools, then pushed her way on to Mississippi. The sunny South charmed her, but this merely became to her an observatory from where she looked to the regions beyond.

At the close of the Mexican–American War, through officers and soldiers returning home, she learned much of the Mexican people, and their condition under a tyrannical priesthood, and her sympathy became so high that she immediately wrote articles for the papers, hoping thus to awaken an interest among the churches and missionary societies, but her appeals met with no response. But Mexico then was in a very unsettled state and she could not enter. Besides, the laws at that time positively forbade the introduction of Protestant Christianity in any form.

=== Texas ===
In 1847, she moved to Texas, where she taught at the Huntsville Male and Female Academy and became a writer for publications of religious article. With Rev. W. Adair, she opened a school at Cincinnati, Texas, in 1848. In Walker County, Texas, she wrote the introduction to her book, Texas in 1850 (1850).

In 1852, she settled at Brownsville, Texas, on the U.S. side of the Rio Grande, opposite Matamoras, Mexico. The outlook was not pleasant. With difficulty she found shelter, for there were no hotels. She succeeded in renting two rooms — one for a bedroom, the other for a school. She had no furniture, but a Mexican woman brought her a cot, an American sent her a pillow, and a German woman said she would cook her meals. In 1854, with the support of the Presbyterian Board of Education, she opened a school, Rio Grande Female Institute, for Mexican girls, many of whom were orphans. This prospered beyond her expectations.

To carry Bibles into Mexico was a direct violation of the laws of the country, yet she maintained that no one had a right to withhold it from the people, and so she devoted her energies to getting the Spanish-language Bible across the river. She found opportunities for sending hundreds of Bibles and 20,000 pages of tracts, furnished her by the American Bible and Tract Societies. Mexicans came to her house earnestly soliciting a copy of the book. Orders came to her from Monterrey and places in the interior for dozens of Bibles, and with money to pay for them. A Protestant portrait painter carried great quantities of books for her into the country. The Mexicans take your books to turn them over to the priests to be burned," said a friend to her; but in several instances she was told that they hid their books, and only read them at night when the priests were not about." She wrote home for help, but was told that a Christian colporteur, speaking the Spanish language could not be found; so, getting assistance for her school, she started out as the agent of the American and Foreign Christian Union, and the work received a new impulse. In 1857, she moved to Matamoras.

Religious liberty came slowly. While she was watching the struggle, severe domestic troubles came upon her. From 1855, her sister taught at Rankin's school, but died three years later, of yellow fever. Though Rankin herself was stricken with yellow fever in 1859, a Mexican woman cared for her, and Rankin recovered.

=== American Civil War ===
When the American Civil War began, Rankin was driven from her Brownsville school because she was not in sympathy with the Confederacy. She did not, however, relinquish her hold readily, but waited until three peremptory orders were sent, the last with the intimation that force would be used if she did not vacate at once. Confiscation of all her property was urged, but the receiver, a Roman Catholic, would not allow it. Rankin found shelter in Matamoras, and here she commenced her direct missionary labors for Mexicans on Mexican soil. But difficulties presented themselves, and often she would spend whole nights in prayer.

"The church will not forget that in Monterey, the very first standard of Protestantism was reared, and that by a courageous and self-denying woman. Miss Melinda Rankin was the true pioneer of missionary labor in Mexico, and it was chiefly through her example and appearls in this country that an interest was awakened." (The Forty-second Annual Report of the Board of Foreign Missions of the Presbyterian Church)

She made a decision to go to Monterrey, which on account of its commercial interest, was one of the most important cities, with a population of about 40,000, and was the center of strong Romish influences and power. In this place, this lone woman, after three months of careful consideration, decided to establish the first Protestant mission in Mexico. She rented house after house, each of which she had to abandon as soon as the priests found out what she was doing. Feeling the need of a chapel and school buildings for successfully carrying on this work, she visited her home in the U.S. and secured several thousand dollars, with which she bought land and erected the necessary buildings in Mexico. In the meantime, converts were multiplying, and some of them were selected by Rankin to go to the adjoining towns and villages within a circle of 100 miles (160 km).

She returned to Brownsville in 1864, but was again forced to leave because of Confederate forces, removing to New Orleans, where she worked in the soldier's hospitals, until 1865.

=== Back to Mexico ===
Then Zacatecas, 300 miles (480 km) away, was selected as another center, and in two years, a church was erected by the Mexicans. But there were more disturbances in 1871, and upon every available spot of her house was written in large letters, "Death to the Protestants." The mission followers were in constant apprehension of assault. Bloody battles were fought not far from Monterrey, and mounted soldiers entered the town and came to her home demanding "her money or her life." She said to these desperadoes: "I am alone and unprotected. You will not harm a helpless lady." She gave them food to appease their hunger, and they left, robbing, destroying other property, and shooting down people on the street. After a time order was restored, and the mission work which had been checked was continued. But all these responsibilities hampered Rankin's health.

In 1872, with 170 members, the Zacatecas center was made over to and occupied by the Presbyterian Board. The work spread on all sides. Mexicans themselves, after obtaining some knowledge of the Bible, would organize "societies" for the purpose of mutual instruction. She had developed the work until it assumed proportions which required ordained ministers. This fact and failing health were indications that her work in Mexico was done. Missionaries of Protestant denominations came forward. In 1872, she returned home and handed over her work to the American Board.

== Later life and death ==
Rankin spent her last years in Bloomington, Illinois. In 1875, she published Twenty Years Among the Mexicans, A Narrative of Missionary Labor. As long as she was able to do so, she traveled extensively around the country, addressing woman's societies and other missionary gathering. After long and severe suffering, she died in Bloomington, on December 6 or 7, 1888. (Note: According to the Texas State Historical Association, Rankin died December 6, 1888. According to Gracey (1898), Rankin died December 7, 1888.) She was buried in Bloomington Cemetery.

== Selected works ==
- Texas in 1850 (1851)
- Twenty Years Among the Mexicans, A Narrative of Missionary Labor (1875)

== See also ==
- Christian Congregational Churches in Mexico
- National Presbyterian Church in Mexico
