= National Register of Historic Places listings in the South Texas region of Texas =

This is a list of the National Register of Historic Places listings in Texas's South Texas region.

The South Texas region is an area of 28 counties defined by the Texas Comptroller for economic reporting in 2022, as mapped here.

The region included 2020 population of 2.4, or 8.3 percent of Texas' population, with about 32 percent in Hidalgo County (which includes McAllen) alone.

To see all locations together in a map, click on "Map all coordinates using OpenSourceMap" at right.

== Aransas County ==
	Name on the Register	Image	Date listed	Location	City or town	Description
1	Aransas Pass Light Station	Aransas Pass Light Station	August 3, 1977 (#77001423)	N of Port Aransas on Harbor Island; 27°51′51″N 97°03′23″W	Port Aransas	Brick lighthouse built in 1857
2	Bracht House	Bracht House	October 11, 2023 (#100009445)	902 East Cornwall St. 28°01′29″N 97°03′08″W	Rockport	
3	George W. Fulton Mansion	George W. Fulton Mansion	April 24, 1975 (#75001945)	Fulton Beach Rd. 28°03′27″N 97°02′05″W	Fulton	State Historic Site, State Antiquities Landmark, Recorded Texas Historic Landmark; Second Empire style house built between 1872 & 1875 for George Ware Fulton.
4	Hoopes-Smith House	Hoopes-Smith House	August 19, 1994 (#94001016)	417 N. Broadway; 28°01′37″N 97°02′59″W	Rockport	Recorded Texas Historic Landmark; Queen Anne style house built between 1890 & 1892 for James M. Hoopes and his family. Now a Bed & Breakfast.
5	Kent-Crane Shell Midden	Kent-Crane Shell Midden	June 21, 1984 (#84001565)	Address restricted	Fulton	41AS3
6	T. H. Mathis House	T. H. Mathis House	June 21, 1971 (#71000918)	612 Church St. 28°01′12″N 97°03′18″W	Rockport	Recorded Texas Historic Landmark; Greek Revival style residence still owned by the same family.
7	Rockport School	Rockport School	February 9, 2024 (#100009945)	619 North Live Oak Street; 28°01′43″N 97°03′09″W	Rockport	

== Bee County ==
	Name on the Register	Image	Date listed	Location	City or town	Description
1	Bee County Courthouse	Bee County Courthouse	February 9, 2001 (#01000105)	105 W. Corpus Christi St. 28°24′04″N 97°44′53″W	Beeville	State Antiquities Landmark, Recorded Texas Historic Landmark
2	Beeville Post Office	Beeville Post Office	April 4, 2007 (#07000272)	111 N. St. Mary's St. 28°24′10″N 97°44′55″W	Beeville	Recorded Texas Historic Landmark
3	Lott-Canada School	Lott-Canada School	December 7, 2010 (#10000981)	900 W. Corpus Christi St. 28°23′53″N 97°45′26″W	Beeville	Historic and Architectural Resources Associated with the Rosenwald School Program in Texas MPS; currently a branch location for the Coastal Bend College.
4	Medio Creek Bridge	Medio Creek Bridge	October 13, 1988 (#88002000)	CR 241; 28°31′46″N 97°47′39″W	Normanna	Recorded Texas Historic Landmark; also called Normanna Bridge
5	NAS Chase Field-Building 1001	NAS Chase Field-Building 1001	February 23, 1994 (#94000050)	Independence St., 0.45 mi. S of jct. with TX 202; 28°22′24″N 97°39′49″W	Beeville	Administration Building
6	NAS Chase Field-Building 1009	NAS Chase Field-Building 1009	February 23, 1994 (#94000051)	Essex St. 0.68 mi. SSE of the jct. of TX 202 and Independence St. 28°22′23″N 97°39′41″W	Beeville	Enlisted WAVES Barracks
7	NAS Chase Field-Building 1015	NAS Chase Field-Building 1015	February 23, 1994 (#94000052)	Byrd St. 0.82 mi. SSE of jct. of TX 202 and Independence St. 28°22′09″N 97°39′39″W	Beeville	Landplane Hangar
8	NAS Chase Field-Building 1040	NAS Chase Field-Building 1040	February 23, 1994 (#94000053)	Enterprise St. 0.37 mi. SSE of the jct. of TX 202 and Independence St. 28°22′32″N 97°39′46″W	Beeville	Auditorium/Gym/Chapel
9	NAS Chase Field-Building 1042	NAS Chase Field-Building 1042	February 23, 1994 (#94000054)	Ofstie Rd. 0.6 mi. SSE of the jct. of TX 202 and Independence St. 28°22′22″N 97°39′39″W	Beeville	Brig
10	NAS Chase Field-Quarters R	NAS Chase Field-Quarters R	February 23, 1994 (#94000055)	Essex St. 0.43 mi. SSW of the jct. of TX 202 and Independence St. 28°22′28″N 97°39′51″W	Beeville	Commanding Officer's Quarters
11	NAS Chase Field-Quarters S	NAS Chase Field-Quarters S	February 23, 1994 (#94000056)	Essex St. 0.45 mi. SSW of the jct. of TX 202 and Independence St. 28°22′29″N 97°39′55″W	Beeville	Executive Officer's Quarters
12	Praeger Building	Praeger Building	September 9, 1982 (#82004490)	110 W. Corpus Christi St. 28°24′06″N 97°44′57″W	Beeville	Recorded Texas Historic Landmark
13	Rialto Theater	Rialto Theater	November 21, 2001 (#01001265)	112-114 N. Washington St. 28°24′08″N 97°44′57″W	Beeville	Recorded Texas Historic Landmark; also called Hall-Rialto Theater

== Brooks County ==
	Name on the Register	Image	Date listed	Location	City or town	Description
1	Brooks County Courthouse	Brooks County Courthouse	April 10, 2012 (#12000193)	100 East Miller Street; 27°13′32″N 98°08′38″W	Falfurrias	Recorded Texas Historic Landmark

== Cameron County ==
	Name on the Register	Image	Date listed	Location	City or town	Description
1	Baxter Building	Baxter Building	March 6, 2019 (#100003420)	106 S. A St. 26°11′33″N 97°41′49″W	Harlingen	
2	Brazos Santiago Depot		July 14, 1971 (#71000923)	Address restricted	Port Isabel	
3	Samuel Wallace Brooks House	Samuel Wallace Brooks House	November 22, 1988 (#88002530)	623 E St. Charles St. 25°54′14″N 97°30′12″W	Brownsville	
4	Brown-Wagner House	Brown-Wagner House	August 29, 1977 (#77001430)	245 E St. Charles St. 25°54′23″N 97°30′22″W	Brownsville	Recorded Texas Historic Landmark
5	Brownsville City Cemetery and Hebrew Cemetery	Brownsville City Cemetery and Hebrew Cemetery	March 31, 2010 (#10000143)	Bound by E. 5th St., Madison St., E 2nd St., and Town Resaca; 25°54′34″N 97°30′00″W	Brownsville	
6	Brownsville City Hall and Market House	Brownsville City Hall and Market House	September 30, 2019 (#100004474)	1150 Market Square; 25°54′08″N 97°29′51″W	Brownsville	
7	Brownsville Freight Depot and Warehouse District	Brownsville Freight Depot and Warehouse District	March 26, 2018 (#100002266)	Roughly bounded by former RR alignment, E Fronton, E 4th & E 9th Sts. 25°54′09″N 97°30′22″W	Brownsville	
8	Old Brulay Plantation		October 10, 1975 (#75001961)	East of Brownsville off of TX 4; 25°51′16″N 97°24′01″W	Brownsville	Also known as the Nye Plantation
9	Cameron County Courthouse	Cameron County Courthouse	September 27, 1980 (#80004084)	1150 E Madison St. 25°54′15″N 97°29′43″W	Brownsville	State Antiquities Landmark, Recorded Texas Historic Landmark
10	Old Cameron County Jail	Old Cameron County Jail	January 24, 1995 (#94001594)	1201 E Van Buren; 25°54′19″N 97°29′34″W	Brownsville	Recorded Texas Historic Landmark
11	Augustine Celaya House	Augustine Celaya House	April 11, 1986 (#86000726)	504 E St. Francis St. 25°54′13″N 97°30′19″W	Brownsville	Recorded Texas Historic Landmark
12	Celaya-Creager House	Celaya-Creager House	May 5, 1988 (#88000523)	441 E Washington St. 25°54′25″N 97°30′09″W	Brownsville	
13	Central Brownsville Historic District		May 31, 2019 (#100004008)	Roughly bounded by E. Levee, E. 10th, E. Monroe, E. 14th & E. 15th Sts. & 2 blk. extension along 800 & 900 blks. of E. Elizabeth St. 25°54′10″N 97°29′51″W	Brownsville	
14	Lillian and George K. Aziz Essey House		September 8, 2021 (#100006889)	1205 West Elizabeth St. 25°55′03″N 97°30′57″W	Brownsville	
15	Fernandez and Laiseca Building		May 11, 2018 (#100002433)	1142-1154 Madison St. 25°54′13″N 97°29′44″W	Brownsville	
16	Miguel Fernandez Hide Yard	Miguel Fernandez Hide Yard	October 1, 1990 (#90001485)	1101-1121 E Adams St. 25°54′11″N 97°29′51″W	Brownsville	also known as El Aleman
17	Fort Brown	Fort Brown	October 15, 1966 (#66000811)	S edge of Brownsville off of International Blvd. 25°53′50″N 97°29′26″W	Brownsville	
18	M.E. and Estela Cueto Garcia House	M.E. and Estela Cueto Garcia House	June 5, 2017 (#100001038)	155 Calle Anacua; 25°55′01″N 97°30′11″W	Brownsville	
19	Garcia Pasture Site		February 23, 1972 (#72001355)	Address restricted	Port Isabel	
20	The Gem	The Gem	June 28, 1991 (#91000852)	400 E 13th St. 25°54′00″N 97°29′52″W	Brownsville	Recorded Texas Historic Landmark
21	Cieta Friedman and Harry W. Hollowell House		March 25, 2019 (#100003533)	622 E. Saint Charles St. 25°54′13″N 97°30′14″W	Brownsville	
22	Hicks-Gregg House	Hicks-Gregg House	July 1, 2009 (#09000486)	1249 W. Washington; 25°55′06″N 97°30′56″W	Brownsville	Recorded Texas Historic Landmark
23	Immaculate Conception Church	Immaculate Conception Church	March 26, 1980 (#80004085)	1218 E Jefferson St. 25°54′09″N 97°29′45″W	Brownsville	Recorded Texas Historic Landmark
24	La Madrilena	La Madrilena	November 17, 1988 (#88002384)	1002 E Madison; 25°54′17″N 97°29′49″W	Brownsville	Recorded Texas Historic Landmark
25	Manautou House	Manautou House	July 14, 1983 (#83003130)	5 E Elizabeth St. 25°54′33″N 97°30′23″W	Brownsville	Recorded Texas Historic Landmark
26	McNair House	McNair House	November 24, 2015 (#15000836)	39 Sunset Drive; 25°55′08″N 97°29′52″W	Brownsville	Recorded Texas Historic Landmark
27	Morris-Browne House	Morris-Browne House	October 25, 2006 (#06000955)	204 E Levee St. 25°54′25″N 97°30′22″W	Brownsville	
28	La Nueva Libertad	La Nueva Libertad	April 11, 1986 (#84001628)	1301 E Madison; 25°54′10″N 97°29′40″W	Brownsville	Recorded Texas Historic Landmark; also known as the Cueto Building
29	Palmito Ranch Battlefield	Palmito Ranch Battlefield	October 15, 1996 (#93000266)	Between TX 4 and the Rio Grande, 12 mi. E of Brownsville; 25°56′48″N 97°17′07″W	Brownsville	
30	Palmville		October 20, 2021 (#100007077)	1400 North Reagan St. 26°08′29″N 97°37′18″W	San Benito	
31	Palo Alto Battlefield National Historical Park	Palo Alto Battlefield National Historical Park	October 15, 1966 (#66000812)	6.3 miles N of Brownsville at intersection of FM 1847 and FM 511; 26°01′04″N 97°28′50″W	Brownsville	
32	Point Isabel Lighthouse	Point Isabel Lighthouse	April 30, 1976 (#76002014)	Corner of TX 100 and Garcia St. 26°04′39″N 97°12′27″W	Port Isabel	State Antiquities Landmark
33	Resaca de la Palma Battlefield	Resaca de la Palma Battlefield	April 11, 1986 (#66000813)	North of intersection of Paredes Line Rd and Price Rd. 25°56′15″N 97°29′10″W	Brownsville	Now a portion of the Palo Alto Battlefield National Historical Park
34	Rio Grande Valley Gas Company Building		August 8, 2022 (#100007983)	355 West Elizabeth St. 25°54′42″N 97°30′35″W	Brownsville	
35	Southern Pacific Railroad Passenger Depot	Southern Pacific Railroad Passenger Depot	November 17, 1978 (#78002903)	601 E Madison St. 25°54′27″N 97°29′57″W	Brownsville	Recorded Texas Historic Landmark
36	Charles Stillman House	Charles Stillman House	November 19, 1979 (#79003448)	1305 E Washington St. 25°54′03″N 97°29′47″W	Brownsville	Recorded Texas Historic Landmark

== Dimmit County ==
	Name on the Register	Image	Date listed	Location	City or town	Description
1	Dimmit County Courthouse	Dimmit County Courthouse	August 14, 1984 (#84001652)	Public Square; 28°31′19″N 99°51′35″W	Carrizo Springs	State Antiquities Landmark, Recorded Texas Historic Landmark
2	Asher and Mary Isabelle Richardson House	Asher and Mary Isabelle Richardson House	November 22, 1988 (#88002539)	US 83; 28°26′31″N 99°45′44″W	Asherton	Recorded Texas Historic Landmark
3	Valenzuela Ranch Headquarters		July 18, 1985 (#85001562)	Valenzuela Creek; 28°13′52″N 99°40′39″W	Catarina	Recorded Texas Historic Landmark

== Duval County ==
(has no NRHP listings)

== Edwards County ==
	Name on the Register	Image	Date listed	Location	City or town	Description
1	Edwards County Courthouse and Jail	Edwards County Courthouse and Jail	November 7, 1979 (#79002932)	Bounded by Austin, Sweeten, Well, and Main Sts. 30°00′58″N 100°12′30″W	Rocksprings	State Antiquities Landmark, Recorded Texas Historic Landmark

== Hidalgo County ==
	Name on the Register	Image	Date listed	Location	City or town	Description
1	1910 Hidalgo County Jail	1910 Hidalgo County Jail	May 26, 2020 (#100005230)	121 East McIntyre St. 26°18′09″N 98°09′42″W	Edinburg	Recorded Texas Historic Landmark
2	Border Theater	Border Theater	August 28, 1998 (#98001124)	905 North Conway Blvd. 26°12′54″N 98°19′33″W	Mission	Recorded Texas Historic Landmark
3	Casa de Palmas	Casa de Palmas	April 18, 2003 (#03000276)	101 N. Main St. 26°12′17″N 98°14′04″W	McAllen	Recorded Texas Historic Landmark
4	Cine El Rey	Cine El Rey	April 26, 2002 (#02000402)	311 S. 17th St. 26°12′05″N 98°14′17″W	McAllen	
5	Cortez Hotel	Cortez Hotel	December 23, 2004 (#04001397)	260 S. Texas Ave. 26°09′33″N 97°59′27″W	Weslaco	Recorded Texas Historic Landmark
6	El Sal Del Rey Archeological District		August 27, 1979 (#79002977)	Address Restricted; 26°32′16″N 98°03′24″W	Linn	
7	Mary S. and Gordon Griffin House	Mary S. and Gordon Griffin House	June 13, 2014 (#14000341)	704 N. 15th Street; 26°12′38″N 98°14′03″W	McAllen	
8	La Lomita Historic District	La Lomita Historic District	May 28, 1975 (#75002165)	5 mi (8.0 km). S of Mission on FM 1016; 26°09′12″N 98°19′32″W	Mission	Includes Recorded Texas Historic Landmark
9	Lomita Boulevard Commercial Historic District	Lomita Boulevard Commercial Historic District	September 18, 1998 (#98001184)	400 to 700 Blocks N. Conway Blvd. 26°12′40″N 98°19′34″W	Mission	
10	Louisiana-Rio Grande Canal Company Irrigation System	Louisiana-Rio Grande Canal Company Irrigation System	November 8, 1995 (#95001284)	S. 2nd St. at River Levee; 26°05′49″N 98°15′42″W	Hidalgo	Address is for First pump station. Listings also includes second pump station in McAllen and approximately 45000 acres of canals in southern Hidalgo County.
11	M and J Nelson Building	M and J Nelson Building	October 1, 2008 (#08000962)	300-308 S. 14th St. 26°12′05″N 98°14′06″W	McAllen	Recorded Texas Historic Landmark
12	McAllen Ranch		April 18, 2007 (#07000337)	FM 1017, 13 mi (21 km). W of TX 281; 26°37′25″N 98°18′02″W	Linn	
13	Sam and Marjorie Miller House	Sam and Marjorie Miller House	July 9, 1997 (#97000780)	707 N. 15th St. 26°12′39″N 98°14′04″W	McAllen	Recorded Texas Historic Landmark
14	Mission Canal Company Second Lift Pumphouse	Mission Canal Company Second Lift Pumphouse	August 30, 2002 (#02000910)	6th St. and Canal; 26°12′43″N 98°19′51″W	Mission	
15	Mission Citrus Growers Union Packing Shed	Mission Citrus Growers Union Packing Shed	August 30, 2002 (#02000911)	824 W. Business TX 83; 26°12′56″N 98°19′56″W	Mission	
16	Oblate Park Historic District	Oblate Park Historic District	December 22, 2005 (#05001459)	Roughly bounded by Doherty, Keralum, W. 16th St. and W 10th St. 26°13′13″N 98°19′17″W	Mission	Includes Recorded Texas Historic Landmark
17	Old Hidalgo Courthouse and Buildings	Old Hidalgo Courthouse and Buildings	February 1, 1980 (#80004136)	Flora and 1st Sts. 26°05′57″N 98°15′44″W	Hidalgo	Includes Recorded Texas Historic Landmarks
18	Old Hidalgo School	Old Hidalgo School	October 24, 1979 (#79002976)	Flora and 4th Sts. 26°05′55″N 98°15′35″W	Hidalgo	State Antiquities Landmark
19	Rancho Toluca		July 21, 1983 (#83004513)	FM 1015; 26°04′14″N 97°56′43″W	Progreso	Includes Recorded Texas Historic Landmarks
20	Roosevelt School Auditorium and Classroom Addition	Roosevelt School Auditorium and Classroom Addition	August 30, 2002 (#02000909)	407 E. 3rd St. 26°12′30″N 98°19′21″W	Mission	
21	John Shary Building	John Shary Building	August 30, 2002 (#02000907)	900 Doherty; 26°12′53″N 98°19′28″W	Mission	Recorded Texas Historic Landmark
22	Teatro La Paz	Teatro La Paz	August 30, 2002 (#02000908)	514,516,518 Doherty; 26°12′39″N 98°19′31″W	Mission	Recorded Texas Historic Landmark
23	Valley Fruit Company	Valley Fruit Company	December 7, 2011 (#11000897)	724 N. Cage Blvd. 26°12′06″N 98°10′54″W	Pharr	

== Jim Hogg ==
(has no NRHP listings)

== Jim Wells County ==
	Name on the Register	Image	Date listed	Location	City or town	Description
1	Hinojosa Site	Hinojosa Site	March 30, 1978 (#78002965)	Address restricted	Alice	

== Kenedy County ==
	Name on the Register	Image	Date listed	Location	City or town	Description
1	King Ranch	King Ranch	October 15, 1966 (#66000820)	Kingsville and its environs 27°31′07″N 97°55′01″W	Kingsville	Extends into Kleberg, Nueces, and Willacy counties
2	Mansfield Cut Underwater Archeological District	Mansfield Cut Underwater Archeological District	January 21, 1974 (#74002083)	Address restricted	Port Isabel	Extends into Willacy County

== Kinney County ==
	Name on the Register	Image	Date listed	Location	City or town	Description
1	1911 Kinney County Courthouse	1911 Kinney County Courthouse	March 22, 2004 (#04000230)	501 S. Ann St. 29°18′48″N 100°25′03″W	Brackettville	State Antiquities Landmark, Recorded Texas Historic Landmark
2	Fort Clark Historic District	Fort Clark Historic District	December 6, 1979 (#79002990)	Off U.S. 90; 29°18′16″N 100°25′23″W	Brackettville	Recorded Texas Historic Landmarks

== Kleberg County ==
	Name on the Register	Image	Date listed	Location	City or town	Description
1	Dunn Ranch, Novillo Line Camp	Dunn Ranch, Novillo Line Camp	October 1, 1974 (#74000277)	S of Corpus Christi in Padre Island National Seashore; 27°27′42″N 97°17′05″W	Corpus Christi	
2	King Ranch	King Ranch	October 15, 1966 (#66000820)	Kingsville and its environs 27°31′07″N 97°55′01″W	Kingsville	Includes Recorded Texas Historic Landmarks; extends into Kenedy, Nueces, and Willacy counties
3	Henrietta M. King High School	Henrietta M. King High School	May 9, 1983 (#83003145)	400 W. King Ave. 27°31′00″N 97°52′22″W	Kingsville	Recorded Texas Historic Landmark
3	Kingsville Downtown Historic District	Kingsville Downtown Historic District	October 15, 2018 (#100002845)	Roughly bound by E Yoakum & E King Aves., N 12th St. & UPRR, 27°31′00″N 97°52′00″W	Kingsville	Includes Recorded Texas Historic Landmarks
4	Kleberg County Courthouse	Kleberg County Courthouse	May 10, 2010 (#10000250)	700 E Kleberg Ave. 27°31′00″N 97°51′34″W	Kingsville	State Antiquities Landmark
5	Nance-Jones House	Nance-Jones House	November 21, 2006 (#06001064)	426 E. Johnston Ave. 27°30′39″N 97°51′48″W	Kingsville	
6	John B. Ragland Mercantile Company Building	John B. Ragland Mercantile Company Building	January 21, 1993 (#92001820)	201 E. Kleberg Ave. 27°30′59″N 97°52′03″W	Kingsville	

== La Salle County ==
	Name on the Register	Image	Date listed	Location	City or town	Description
1	Cotulla Downtown Historic District	Cotulla Downtown Historic District	April 16, 2013 (#13000177)	Roughly bounded by Kerr, Tilden, Market and Carrizo Sts. 28°26′08″N 99°14′12″W	Cotulla	Includes the La Salle County Courthouse.
2	Cotulla Ranch		June 13, 2014 (#14000342)	1 mi. W. of jct. of I-35 & Crockett St. 28°26′25″N 99°16′04″W	Cotulla vicinity	
3	La Salle County Courthouse	La Salle County Courthouse	July 11, 2007 (#07000690)	101 Courthouse Square; 28°26′08″N 99°14′12″W	Cotulla	State Antiquities Landmark; part of Cotulla Downtown Historic District
4	Welhausen School and Florita Plaza		September 23, 2021 (#100007001)	204 East Lane St. 28°25′50″N 99°13′43″W	Cotulla	

== Live Oak County ==
	Name on the Register	Image	Date listed	Location	City or town	Description
1	Fort Merrill	Fort Merrill	November 22, 1991 (#91001686)	Address restricted	Dinero	
2	Live Oak County Jail	Live Oak County Jail	February 25, 2004 (#04000098)	Public square in Oakville; 28°26′56″N 98°06′05″W	Oakville	Recorded Texas Historic Landmark
3	Pagan Site, 41 LK 58	Pagan Site, 41 LK 58	August 10, 1978 (#78002972)	Address restricted	Calliham	

== Maverick County ==
	Name on the Register	Image	Date listed	Location	City or town	Description
1	Fort Duncan	Fort Duncan	December 9, 1971 (#71000954)	Bounded by Monroe and Garrison Sts,. city limits on the S, and the Rio Grande on the W 28°42′07″N 100°30′17″W	Eagle Pass	State Antiquities Landmark, contains Recorded Texas Historic Landmark
2	Maverick County Courthouse	Maverick County Courthouse	February 15, 1980 (#80004141)	Public Sq. 28°42′32″N 100°30′05″W	Eagle Pass	State Antiquities Landmark, Recorded Texas Historic Landmark

== McMullen County ==
	Name on the Register	Image	Date listed	Location	City or town	Description
1	Mustang Branch Site		August 10, 1978 (#78003096)	Address restricted	Calliham	

== Nueces County ==
	Name on the Register	Image	Date listed	Location	City or town	Description
1	600 Building	600 Building	March 22, 2016 (#16000121)	600 Leopard Street; 27°47′47″N 97°23′48″W	Corpus Christi	
2	Britton-Evans House	Britton-Evans House	December 12, 1976 (#76002054)	411 N. Upper Broadway; 27°47′37″N 97°23′48″W	Corpus Christi	Recorded Texas Historic Landmark; also known as the Centennial House
3	Broadway Bluff Improvement	Broadway Bluff Improvement	October 11, 1988 (#88001829)	Roughly bounded by Upper and Lower Broadway, I-37, Mann and Mesquite Sts. 27°47′48″N 97°23′46″W	Corpus Christi	Recorded Texas Historic Landmark
4	Galvan Ballroom	Galvan Ballroom	June 3, 2015 (#15000336)	1632 Agnes; 27°47′14″N 97°24′33″W	Corpus Christi	
5	Simon Gugenheim House	Simon Gugenheim House	March 10, 1983 (#83003155)	1601 N. Chaparral St. 27°48′23″N 97°23′43″W	Corpus Christi	Recorded Texas Historic Landmark
6	King Ranch	King Ranch	October 15, 1966 (#66000820)	Kingsville and its environs 27°31′07″N 97°55′01″W	Kingsville	Extends into Kenedy, Kleberg, and Willacy counties
7	Richard King House	Richard King House	March 17, 1993 (#93000129)	611 S. Upper Broadway; 27°47′14″N 97°23′48″W	Corpus Christi	Recorded Texas Historic Landmark
8	S. Julius Lichtenstein House	S. Julius Lichtenstein House	March 10, 1983 (#83003156)	1617 N. Chaparral St. 27°48′26″N 97°23′44″W	Corpus Christi	Recorded Texas Historic Landmark; now the Institute of Hispanic Culture
9	Old Bayview Cemetery		October 21, 2020 (#100005689)	Ramirez St. at Padre St. 27°48′02″N 97°23′58″W	Corpus Christi	
10	Old Nueces County Courthouse	Old Nueces County Courthouse	June 24, 1976 (#76002055)	701 Mesquite at Belden Sts. 27°48′06″N 97°23′45″W	Corpus Christi	State Antiquities Landmark, Recorded Texas Historic Landmark
11	Old St. Anthony's Catholic Church	Old St. Anthony's Catholic Church	September 7, 1979 (#79003003)	S. Violet Rd. and TX 44; 27°46′57″N 97°35′40″W	Violet	Recorded Texas Historic Landmark
12	Oso Dune Site (41NU37)	Oso Dune Site (41NU37)	August 23, 1985 (#85001799)	Address restricted	Corpus Christi	
13	Ritz Theatre	Ritz Theatre	January 26, 2024 (#100009892)	715 North Chaparral Street; 27°47′54″N 97°23′38″W	Corpus Christi	
14	Wynn Seale Junior High School	Wynn Seale Junior High School	February 16, 1996 (#96000065)	1701 Ayers St. 27°46′12″N 97°24′12″W	Corpus Christi	Recorded Texas Historic Landmark
15	Sherman Building	Sherman Building	October 28, 2010 (#10000863)	317 Peoples St. 27°47′48″N 97°23′37″W	Corpus Christi	
16	Charlotte Sidbury House	Charlotte Sidbury House	March 10, 1983 (#83003157)	1609 N. Chaparral St. 27°48′24″N 97°23′44″W	Corpus Christi	Recorded Texas Historic Landmark
17	Tarpon Inn	Tarpon Inn	September 14, 1979 (#79003002)	200 E. Cotter St; 27°50′15″N 97°03′36″W	Port Aransas	
18	Tucker Site (41NU46)	Tucker Site (41NU46)	August 29, 1985 (#85001940)	Address restricted	Corpus Christi	
19	USS Lexington	USS Lexington	July 31, 2003 (#03001043)	USS Lexington Museum on the Bay, 2914 North Shoreline Blvd. 27°48′54″N 97°23′20″W	Corpus Christi	

== Real County ==
	Name on the Register	Image	Date listed	Location	City or town	Description
1	Mission San Lorenzo de la Santa Cruz	Mission San Lorenzo de la Santa Cruz	July 14, 1971 (#71000958)	Off State Hwy 55 north of Camp Wood; 29°40′37″N 100°00′54″W	Camp Wood	

== Refugio County ==
	Name on the Register	Image	Date listed	Location	City or town	Description
1	Amon B. King's Men Monument	Amon B. King's Men Monument	July 27, 2018 (#100002758)	807 Commerce St., King's Memorial Park; 28°17′47″N 97°16′30″W	Refugio	
2	Mitchell-Simmons House	Mitchell-Simmons House	February 1, 2024 (#100009893)	904 Commerce Street; 28°17′45″N 97°16′33″W	Refugio	Also known as "Anaqua". Severely damaged during Hurricane Harvey in 2017.
3	Mission Nuestra Senora del Refugio Monument	Mission Nuestra Senora del Refugio Monument	July 27, 2018 (#100002759)	1008 S Alamo St. 28°17′39″N 97°16′39″W	Refugio	
4	Refugio County Courthouse	Refugio County Courthouse	August 22, 2002 (#02000895)	808 Commerce; 28°17′48″N 97°16′33″W	Refugio	
5	John Howland Wood House	John Howland Wood House	October 13, 1983 (#83003811)	1 Copano Bay St. 28°05′32″N 97°12′45″W	Bayside	Recorded Texas Historic Landmark

== San Patricio County ==
	Name on the Register	Image	Date listed	Location	City or town	Description
1	James McGloin Homestead		July 14, 1971 (#71000961)	1 mi (1.6 km). NW of San Patricio on FM 666; 27°58′12″N 97°47′34″W	San Patricio	Boundary increase November 15, 1979; Recorded Texas Historic Landmark
2	San Patricio de Hibernia Monument	San Patricio de Hibernia Monument	April 19, 2018 (#100002352)	Main St,, Constitution Sq. 27°57′06″N 97°46′23″W	San Patricio	
3	Sons of San Patricio Monument	Sons of San Patricio Monument	April 19, 2018 (#100002353)	Cty. Rd. 1441 (21), Old San Patricio Cemetery; 27°57′34″N 97°45′43″W	San Patricio	
4	Taft Public Housing Development (North)	Taft Public Housing Development (North)	August 29, 2018 (#100002848)	407 through 426 Industrial St. 27°58′57″N 97°23′47″W	Taft	
5	Taft Public Housing Development (South)	Taft Public Housing Development (South)	August 29, 2018 (#100002849)	Roughly bounded by Ave. C, Walnut, 2nd & Ash Sts. 27°58′32″N 97°23′57″W	Taft	

== Starr County ==
	Name on the Register	Image	Date listed	Location	City or town	Description
1	Silverio de la Pena Drugstore and Post Office	Silverio de la Pena Drugstore and Post Office	September 2, 1980 (#80004150)	423 E. Main St. 26°22′39″N 98°49′00″W	Rio Grande City	Part of Rio Grande City Downtown Historic District
2	Fort Ringgold Historic District	Fort Ringgold Historic District	March 26, 1993 (#93000196)	Rio Grande City School grounds, 1/4 mi. SE of jct. of US 83 and TX 755; 26°22′25″N 98°48′26″W	Rio Grande City	Includes Recorded Texas Historic Landmarks
3	Fred and Nell Kain Guerra House		December 6, 2005 (#05001400)	800 Blk. W Main; 26°22′54″N 98°49′45″W	Rio Grande City	
4	LaBorde House, Store and Hotel	LaBorde House, Store and Hotel	May 29, 1980 (#80004149)	601 E. Main St. 26°22′38″N 98°48′56″W	Rio Grande City	Part of Rio Grande City Downtown Historic District
5	Mifflin Kenedy Warehouse and Old Starr County Courthouse	Mifflin Kenedy Warehouse and Old Starr County Courthouse	July 8, 2005 (#05000657)	200 Blk. W. Water St. 26°22′49″N 98°49′21″W	Rio Grande City	
6	Rio Grande City Downtown Historic District	Rio Grande City Downtown Historic District	July 8, 2005 (#05000656)	Roughly bounded by N. Corpus, E. Wimpy, N. Avasolo and E. Mirasoles; 26°22′41″N 98°49′01″W	Rio Grande City	Includes Recorded Texas Historic Landmarks
7	Roma Historic District	Roma Historic District	July 31, 1972 (#72001371)	Properties along Estrella and Hidalgo Sts. between Garfield St. and Bravo Alley; 26°24′22″N 99°01′05″W	Roma	Includes State Antiquities Landmarks, Recorded Texas Historic Landmarks
8	Roma-San Pedro International Bridge		March 23, 1984 (#84001959)	SW of Hidalgo St. and Bravo Alley; 26°24′13″N 99°01′06″W	Roma-Los Saenz	Part of Roma Historic District; State Antiquities Landmark
9	Yzaquirre-Longoria House		December 22, 2005 (#05001462)	107 W. Water St. 26°22′44″N 98°49′23″W	Rio Grande City	

== Uvalde County ==
	Name on the Register	Image	Date listed	Location	City or town	Description
1	First National Bank	First National Bank	March 31, 2014 (#14000106)	100 S. East St. 29°12′35″N 99°47′07″W	Uvalde	
2	Fort Inge Archeological Site	Fort Inge Archeological Site	September 12, 1985 (#85002298)	Southeast of Uvalde off FM 140; 29°10′45″N 99°45′57″W	Uvalde	Remnants of a frontier fort established in 1849. Now a county park.
3	John Nance Garner House	John Nance Garner House	December 8, 1976 (#76002074)	333 N. Park St. 29°12′45″N 99°47′33″W	Uvalde	State Antiquities Landmark, Recorded Texas Historic Landmark; former home of John Nance Garner, 32nd Vice-President of the United States. Now a museum about his life and times.
4	Grand Opera House	Grand Opera House	May 22, 1978 (#78002996)	E. North and N. Getty Sts. 29°12′37″N 99°47′12″W	Uvalde	Recorded Texas Historic Landmark; built in 1891 for plays, musicals, and cultural performances. It still serves the same function today making it the oldest functioning theater in the state of Texas.
5	Leona River Archeological Site	Leona River Archeological Site	May 6, 1976 (#76002075)	Address restricted	Uvalde	
6	Nicolas Street School	Nicolas Street School	November 27, 2010 (#10000963)	332 Nicolas Street; 29°12′08″N 99°47′35″W	Uvalde	Recorded Texas Historic Landmark
7	State Highway 3 Bridge at the Nueces River	State Highway 3 Bridge at the Nueces River	October 10, 1996 (#96001108)	US 90, 13 mi (21 km). E of jct. with Kinney Cnty. 29°12′20″N 99°54′07″W	Uvalde	
8	Taylor Slough Archeological Site	Taylor Slough Archeological Site	May 4, 1976 (#76002076)	Address restricted	Uvalde	
9	Uvalde Downtown Historic District	Uvalde Downtown Historic District	May 31, 2019 (#100004009)	Centered around jct. of US 90 & US 83, roughly bounded by School Ln., Hornby Pl., 2nd Alley & High St. 29°12′35″N 99°47′12″W	Uvalde	
10	Uvalde Flint Quarry	Uvalde Flint Quarry	June 3, 1976 (#76002077)	Address restricted	Uvalde	
11	Willingham Site	Willingham Site	April 26, 1976 (#76002078)	Address restricted	Uvalde	

== Val Verde County ==
	Name on the Register	Image	Date listed	Location	City or town	Description
1	Cassinelli Gin House		September 4, 1986 (#86002188)	Corner of Pecan and Academy Sts. 29°21′13″N 100°53′48″W	Del Rio	Recorded Texas Historic Landmark
2	Del Rio Cemeteries Historic District		July 11, 2003 (#03000664)	Roughly bounded by W 2nd St., Johnson Blvd., and St. Peter's St. 29°21′43″N 100°55′00″W	Del Rio	
3	Lower Pecos Canyonlands Archeological District	Lower Pecos Canyonlands Archeological District	January 13, 2021 (#100006256)	Lower Pecos River watershed area^{Coordinates missing}	Comstock	Thirty-five mostly discontiguous rock art and other archeological sites; also listed in part in several other listings in this county, including Seminole Canyon Archeological District, Lower Pecos Canyon Archeological District, Mile Canyon, and the Rattlesnake Canyon Site.
4	Lower Pecos Canyon Archeological District	Lower Pecos Canyon Archeological District	March 31, 1971 (#71000966)	Address restricted	Comstock	
5	Mile Canyon	Mile Canyon	October 15, 1970 (#70000773)	Just downstream from Langtry; 29°48′35″N 101°33′01″W	Langtry	Also known as Eagle Nest Canyon
6	Rattlesnake Canyon Site	Rattlesnake Canyon Site	September 28, 1971 (#71000968)	Address restricted	Langtry	
7	San Felipe Creek Archeological District	San Felipe Creek Archeological District	October 16, 1974 (#74002096)	Address restricted	Del Rio	
8	Seminole Canyon Archeological District	Seminole Canyon Archeological District	January 25, 1971 (#71000967)	Between US 90 and the Rio Grande west of Comstock; 29°41′00″N 101°19′06″W	Comstock	State Historic Site
9	Seven Mile Ranch Archeological District	Seven Mile Ranch Archeological District	November 16, 1990 (#90001733)	Address restricted	Comstock	
10	Val Verde County Courthouse And Jail	Val Verde County Courthouse And Jail	August 18, 1977 (#77001478)	400 Pecan St. 29°21′32″N 100°53′50″W	Del Rio	State Antiquities Landmark
11	West of Pecos Railroad Camps District	West of Pecos Railroad Camps District	April 3, 1973 (#73001982)	Address restricted	Comstock	

== Webb County ==
	Name on the Register	Image	Date listed	Location	City or town	Description
1	Barrio Azteca Historic District	Barrio Azteca Historic District	May 21, 2003 (#03000431)	Roughly bounded by I-35, Matamoros St., Arroyo Zacate, and the Rio Grande; 27°30′09″N 99°29′54″W	Laredo	
2	Fort McIntosh	Fort McIntosh	June 25, 1975 (#75002011)	Laredo College campus 27°30′28″N 99°31′17″W	Laredo	Includes Recorded Texas Historic Landmark
3	Hamilton Hotel	Hamilton Hotel	April 14, 1992 (#92000363)	815 Salinas St. 27°30′25″N 99°30′30″W	Laredo	
4	Laredo U.S. Post Office, Court House and Custom House	Laredo U.S. Post Office, Court House and Custom House	May 18, 2001 (#01000516)	1300 Matamoros; 27°30′24″N 99°30′32″W	Laredo	
5	Los Ojuelos		December 22, 1976 (#76002084)	2.5 mi (4.0 km). S of Mirando City on SR 649; 27°24′12″N 98°59′42″W	Mirando City	
6	Pan-American Courts and Cafe		January 24, 2022 (#100007392)	3301 San Bernardo Ave. 27°31′46″N 99°30′15″W	Laredo	
7	San Augustin de Laredo Historic District	San Augustin de Laredo Historic District	September 19, 1973 (#73001983)	Roughly bounded by Grant and Water Sts., Convent and San Bernardino Aves. 27°30′07″N 99°30′19″W	Laredo	Includes Recorded Texas Historic Landmarks
8	San Jose de Palafox Historic/Archeological District	San Jose de Palafox Historic/Archeological District	July 24, 1973 (#73001984)	Address restricted	Laredo	
9	U.S. Inspection Station - Laredo, Texas	U.S. Inspection Station - Laredo, Texas	September 10, 2014 (#14000600)	100 Convent Avenue; 27°30′06″N 99°30′26″W	Laredo	
10	Webb County Courthouse	Webb County Courthouse	May 4, 1981 (#81000635)	1000 Houston St. 27°30′26″N 99°30′20″W	Laredo	State Antiquities Landmark

== Willacy County ==
	Name on the Register	Image	Date listed	Location	City or town	Description
1	King Ranch	King Ranch	October 15, 1966 (#66000820)	Kingsville and its environs 27°31′07″N 97°55′01″W	Kingsville	Extends into Kenedy, Kleberg, and Nueces counties
2	Mansfield Cut Underwater Archeological District	Mansfield Cut Underwater Archeological District	January 21, 1974 (#74002083)	Address restricted	Port Isabel	Extends into Kenedy County
3	Old Lyford High School	Old Lyford High School	November 7, 1985 (#85002770)	High School Circle; 26°24′37″N 97°47′48″W	Lyford	Recorded Texas Historic Landmark
4	Willacy County Courthouse	Willacy County Courthouse	January 17, 2017 (#100000507)	547 W. Hidalgo Ave. 26°28′57″N 97°47′15″W	Raymondville	Recorded Texas Historic Landmark

== Zapata County ==
	Name on the Register	Image	Date listed	Location	City or town	Description
1	Corralitos Ranch		August 2, 1977 (#77001483)	2 mi (3.2 km). N of San Ygnacio off U.S. 83; 27°07′10″N 99°25′50″W	San Ygnacio	
2	Dolores Nuevo	Dolores Nuevo	November 27, 1973 (#73001986)	Address restricted	Laredo	
3	Dolores Viejo	Dolores Viejo	August 17, 1973 (#73001987)	Address restricted	San Ygnacio	
4	San Francisco Ranch		March 25, 1977 (#77001484)	1 mi (1.6 km). N of San Ygnacio; 27°04′53″N 99°25′48″W	San Ygnacio	
5	San Ygnacio Historic District	San Ygnacio Historic District	July 16, 1973 (#73001988)	Town of San Ygnacio; 27°02′44″N 99°26′34″W	San Ygnacio	
6	Trevino-Uribe Rancho	Trevino-Uribe Rancho	July 16, 1973 (#73002342)	Jct. of Uribe and Trevino Sts. 27°02′42″N 99°26′36″W	San Ygnacio	Recorded Texas Historic Landmark, part of San Ygnacio Historic District

== Zavala County ==
	Name on the Register	Image	Date listed	Location	City or town	Description
1	Crystal City Internment Camp	Crystal City Internment Camp	August 1, 2014 (#14000474)	Roughly bounded by Airport Drive, Popeye Lane, North 7th & North 12th Avenues; 28°41′24″N 99°49′24″W	Crystal City	
