= Ragland House =

Ragland House may refer to:

- Ragland House (Little Rock, Arkansas), listed on the National Register of Historic Places (NRHP) in Arkansas
- Bailey-Ragland House, Paris, TX, listed on the NRHP in Texas
- Ragland House (Paris, Texas), listed on the NRHP in Texas

== See also ==
- John B. Ragland Mercantile Company Building, Kingsville, Texas, NRHP-listed
- R. A. Ragland Building, Sweetwater, Texas, NRHP-listed
