= National Register of Historic Places listings in Willacy County, Texas =

Location of Willacy County in Texas

This is a list of the National Register of Historic Places listings in Willacy County, Texas.

This is intended to be a complete list of properties and districts listed on the National Register of Historic Places in Willacy County, Texas, United States. The publicly disclosed locations of National Register properties and districts may be seen in a mapping service provided.

There are 4 properties and districts listed on the National Register in the county, including 1 National Historic Landmark.

This National Park Service list is complete through NPS recent listings posted March 21, 2025.

== Current listings ==
	Name on the Register	Image	Date listed	Location	City or town	Description
1	King Ranch	King Ranch	October 15, 1966 (#66000820)	Kingsville and its environs 27°31′07″N 97°55′01″W	Kingsville	Extends into Kenedy, Kleberg, and Nueces counties
2	Mansfield Cut Underwater Archeological District	Mansfield Cut Underwater Archeological District	January 21, 1974 (#74002083)	Address restricted	Port Isabel	Extends into Kenedy County
3	Old Lyford High School	Old Lyford High School	November 7, 1985 (#85002770)	High School Circle; 26°24′37″N 97°47′48″W	Lyford	Recorded Texas Historic Landmark
4	Willacy County Courthouse	Willacy County Courthouse	January 17, 2017 (#100000507)	547 W. Hidalgo Ave. 26°28′57″N 97°47′15″W	Raymondville	Recorded Texas Historic Landmark

== See also ==
- National Register of Historic Places listings in Texas
- List of National Historic Landmarks in Texas
- Recorded Texas Historic Landmarks in Willacy County
