= National Register of Historic Places listings in Nueces County, Texas =

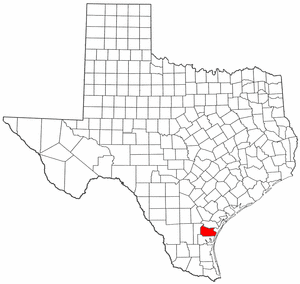
Location of Nueces County in Texas

This is a list of the National Register of Historic Places listings in Nueces County, Texas.

This is intended to be a complete list of properties and districts listed on the National Register of Historic Places in Nueces County, Texas. There are one district and 18 individual properties listed on the National Register in the county. The district and one individual property are National Historic Landmarks while nine other properties are Recorded Texas Historic Landmarks including one that is also a State Antiquities Landmark. One property, the Cayo del Oso site, was described as listed in the weekly update published October 9, 2026; it was described as "determined eligible owner objection" the following week.

This National Park Service list is complete through NPS recent listings posted October 9, 2026.

== Current listings ==
The locations of National Register properties and districts may be seen in a mapping service provided.

	Name on the Register	Image	Date listed	Location	City or town	Description
1	600 Building	600 Building	March 22, 2016 (#16000121)	600 Leopard Street; 27°47′47″N 97°23′48″W	Corpus Christi	
2	Britton-Evans House	Britton-Evans House	December 12, 1976 (#76002054)	411 N. Upper Broadway; 27°47′37″N 97°23′48″W	Corpus Christi	Recorded Texas Historic Landmark; also known as the Centennial House
3	Broadway Bluff Improvement	Broadway Bluff Improvement	October 11, 1988 (#88001829)	Roughly bounded by Upper and Lower Broadway, I-37, Mann and Mesquite Sts. 27°47′48″N 97°23′46″W	Corpus Christi	Recorded Texas Historic Landmark
4	Galvan Ballroom	Galvan Ballroom	June 3, 2015 (#15000336)	1632 Agnes; 27°47′14″N 97°24′33″W	Corpus Christi	
5	Simon Gugenheim House	Simon Gugenheim House	March 10, 1983 (#83003155)	1601 N. Chaparral St. 27°48′23″N 97°23′43″W	Corpus Christi	Recorded Texas Historic Landmark
6	King Ranch	King Ranch	October 15, 1966 (#66000820)	Kingsville and its environs 27°31′07″N 97°55′01″W	Kingsville	Extends into Kenedy, Kleberg, and Willacy counties
7	Richard King House	Richard King House	March 17, 1993 (#93000129)	611 S. Upper Broadway; 27°47′14″N 97°23′48″W	Corpus Christi	Recorded Texas Historic Landmark
8	S. Julius Lichtenstein House	S. Julius Lichtenstein House	March 10, 1983 (#83003156)	1617 N. Chaparral St. 27°48′26″N 97°23′44″W	Corpus Christi	Recorded Texas Historic Landmark; now the Institute of Hispanic Culture
9	Old Bayview Cemetery		October 21, 2020 (#100005689)	Ramirez St. at Padre St. 27°48′02″N 97°23′58″W	Corpus Christi	
10	Old Nueces County Courthouse	Old Nueces County Courthouse	June 24, 1976 (#76002055)	701 Mesquite at Belden Sts. 27°48′06″N 97°23′45″W	Corpus Christi	State Antiquities Landmark, Recorded Texas Historic Landmark
11	Old St. Anthony's Catholic Church	Old St. Anthony's Catholic Church	September 7, 1979 (#79003003)	S. Violet Rd. and TX 44; 27°46′57″N 97°35′40″W	Violet	Recorded Texas Historic Landmark
12	Oso Dune Site (41NU37)	Oso Dune Site (41NU37)	August 23, 1985 (#85001799)	Address restricted	Corpus Christi	
13	Ritz Theatre	Ritz Theatre	January 26, 2024 (#100009892)	715 North Chaparral Street; 27°47′54″N 97°23′38″W	Corpus Christi	
14	Wynn Seale Junior High School	Wynn Seale Junior High School	February 16, 1996 (#96000065)	1701 Ayers St. 27°46′12″N 97°24′12″W	Corpus Christi	Recorded Texas Historic Landmark
15	Sherman Building	Sherman Building	October 28, 2010 (#10000863)	317 Peoples St. 27°47′48″N 97°23′37″W	Corpus Christi	
16	Charlotte Sidbury House	Charlotte Sidbury House	March 10, 1983 (#83003157)	1609 N. Chaparral St. 27°48′24″N 97°23′44″W	Corpus Christi	Recorded Texas Historic Landmark
17	Tarpon Inn	Tarpon Inn	September 14, 1979 (#79003002)	200 E. Cotter St; 27°50′15″N 97°03′36″W	Port Aransas	
18	Tucker Site (41NU46)	Tucker Site (41NU46)	August 29, 1985 (#85001940)	Address restricted	Corpus Christi	
19	USS Lexington	USS Lexington	July 31, 2003 (#03001043)	USS Lexington Museum on the Bay, 2914 North Shoreline Blvd. 27°48′54″N 97°23′20″W	Corpus Christi	

== See also ==
- National Register of Historic Places listings in Texas
- List of National Historic Landmarks in Texas
- Recorded Texas Historic Landmarks in Nueces County
