= National Register of Historic Places listings in San Patricio County, Texas =

Location of San Patricio County in Texas

This is a list of the National Register of Historic Places listings in San Patricio County, Texas.

This is intended to be a complete list of properties listed on the National Register of Historic Places in San Patricio County, Texas. There is one property listed on the National Register in the county. This property is also a Recorded Texas Historic Landmark.

This National Park Service list is complete through NPS recent listings posted March 21, 2025.

== Current listings ==
The locations of National Register properties may be seen in a mapping service provided.

	Name on the Register	Image	Date listed	Location	City or town	Description
1	James McGloin Homestead		July 14, 1971 (#71000961)	1 mi (1.6 km). NW of San Patricio on FM 666; 27°58′12″N 97°47′34″W	San Patricio	Boundary increase November 15, 1979; Recorded Texas Historic Landmark
2	San Patricio de Hibernia Monument	San Patricio de Hibernia Monument	April 19, 2018 (#100002352)	Main St,, Constitution Sq. 27°57′06″N 97°46′23″W	San Patricio	
3	Sons of San Patricio Monument	Sons of San Patricio Monument	April 19, 2018 (#100002353)	Cty. Rd. 1441 (21), Old San Patricio Cemetery; 27°57′34″N 97°45′43″W	San Patricio	
4	Taft Public Housing Development (North)	Taft Public Housing Development (North)	August 29, 2018 (#100002848)	407 through 426 Industrial St. 27°58′57″N 97°23′47″W	Taft	
5	Taft Public Housing Development (South)	Taft Public Housing Development (South)	August 29, 2018 (#100002849)	Roughly bounded by Ave. C, Walnut, 2nd & Ash Sts. 27°58′32″N 97°23′57″W	Taft	

== See also ==
- National Register of Historic Places listings in Texas
- Recorded Texas Historic Landmarks in San Patricio County
