= Old St. Anthony's Catholic Church (Violet, Texas) =

Historic church in Texas, United States

- U.S. National Register of Historic Places
- Recorded Texas Historic Landmark
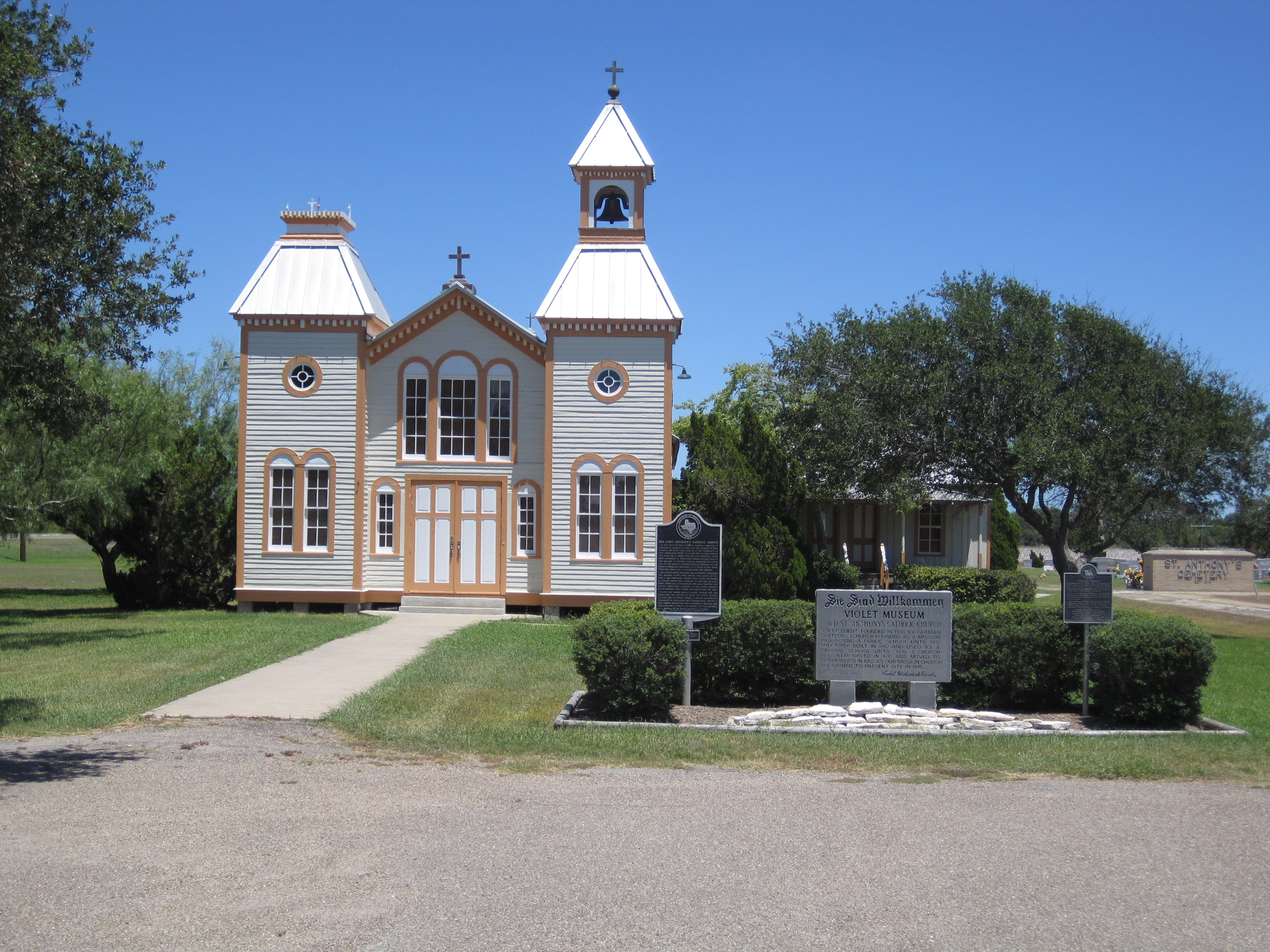
- Old St. Anthony's Church in 2011

- Location within Texas Location within the United States
- Location: S. Violet Rd. and TX 44, Violet, Texas
- Coordinates: 27°46′57″N 97°35′40″W
- Area: less than one acre
- Built: 1910
- Architect: John W. Hoelscher, Rev. Mark Moeslein
- NRHP reference No.: 79003003
- RTHL No.: 6332

Significant dates
- Added to NRHP: September 7, 1979
- Designated RTHL: 1978

Old St. Anthony's Catholic Church (Violet Museum) is a historic church at S. Violet Rd. and TX 44 in Violet, Texas, United States.

It was built in 1910 and added to the National Register of Historic Places in 1979.

== See also ==
- National Register of Historic Places listings in Nueces County, Texas
- Recorded Texas Historic Landmarks in Nueces County
