= Port Mansfield Channel =

Artificial water inlet in Texas, United States

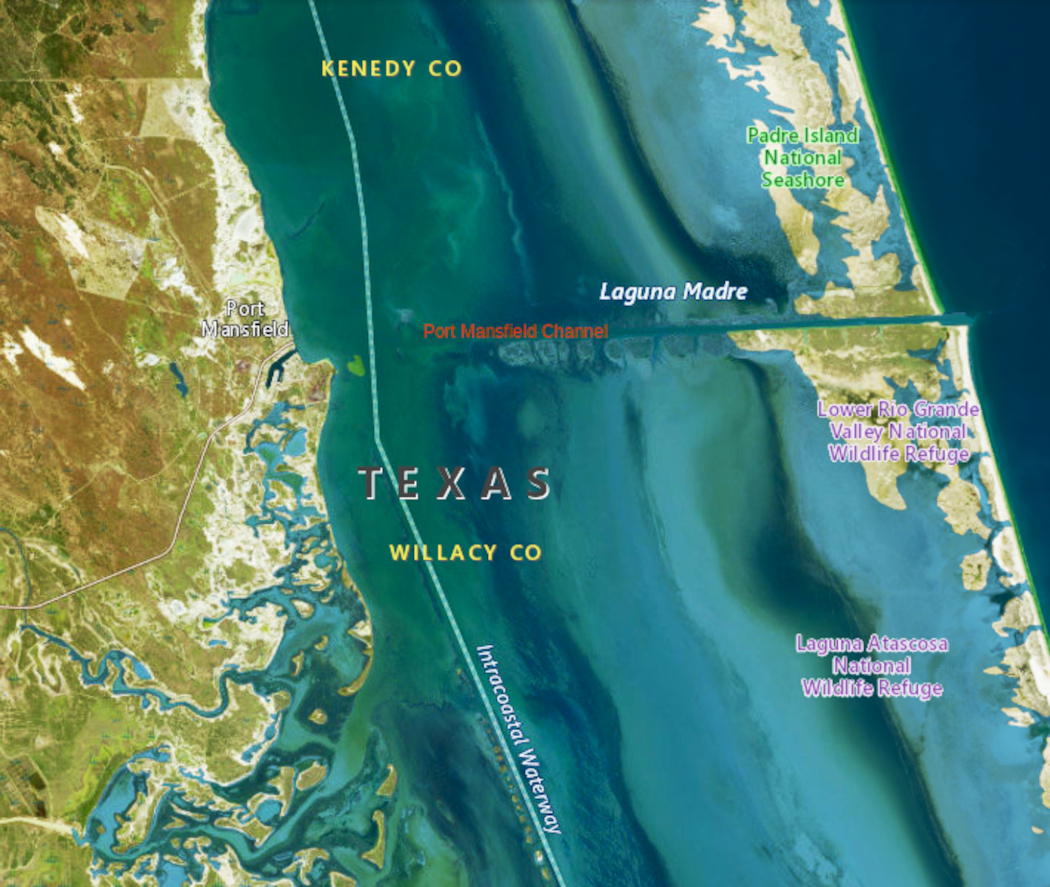
- Port Mansfield Channel

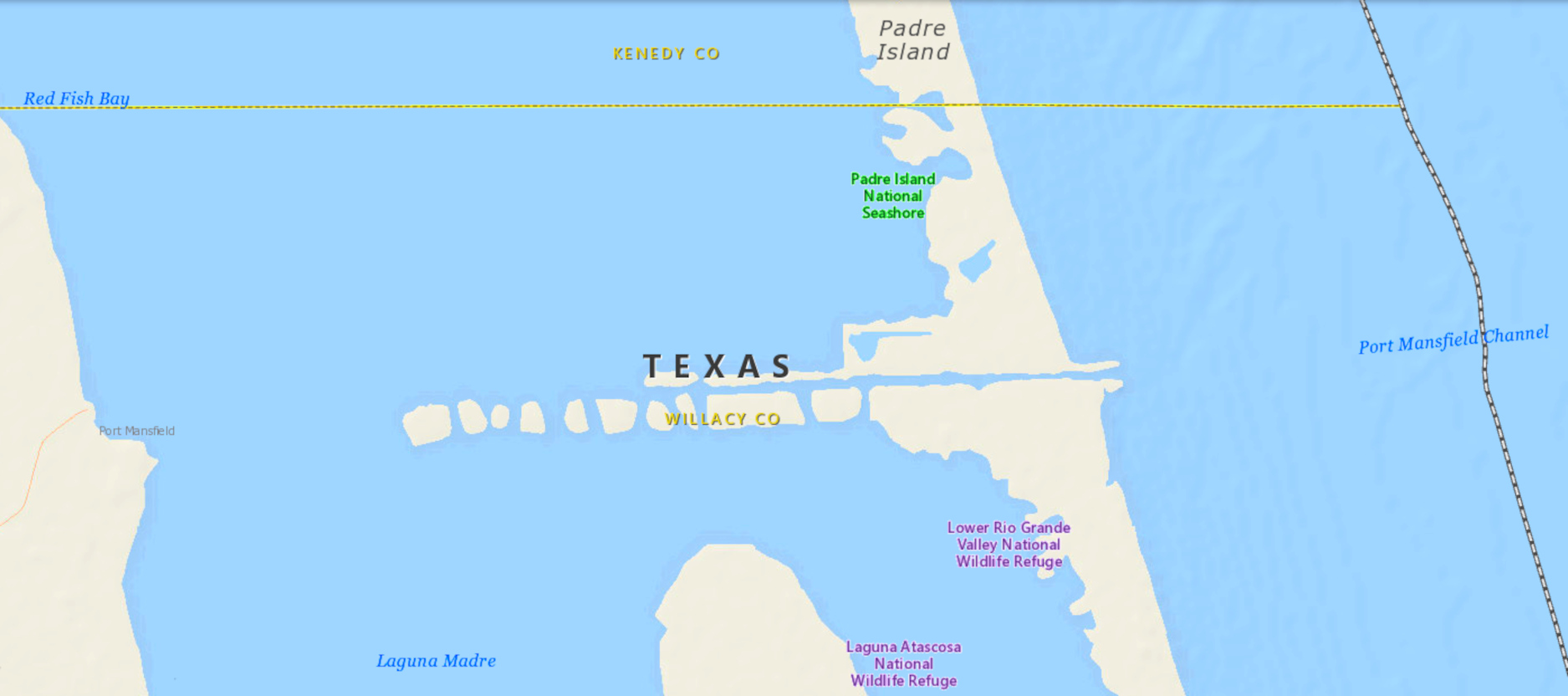
- Mansfield Cut at Padre Island

- Port Mansfield Channel Entrance
- Location: Padre Island; Port Mansfield, Texas; Willacy County, Texas
- Country: United States
- Coordinates: 26.5609°N 97.34831°W

Specifications
- Length: 15.3 km (9.5 miles)
- Navigation authority: ☆ Port of Port Mansfield; ☆ Willacy County Navigation District
- Port Mansfield Marinas: Port Mansfield Boat Basin Marina (Map).; Willacy County Navigation District Marina (Map).

History
- Former names: East Cut; Mansfield Cut; Port Mansfield Gulf Channel
- Modern name: Port Mansfield Channel
- Current owner: Willacy County Navigation District
- Other engineer: Army Corps of Engineers
- Construction began: September 1957
- Date restored: July 1962
- Topo Map: Port Mansfield Channel (Map).

Geography
- Start point: Gulf of Mexico
- End point: Red Fish Bay, Texas (Map).
- Beginning coordinates: 26.564045°N 97.268697°W
- Ending coordinates: 26.558954°N 97.401091°W
- Connects to: Gulf Intracoastal Waterway; Laguna Madre
- GNIS feature ID: 1344370

Port Mansfield Channel or Mansfield Cut is an artificial waterway encompassing the Laguna Madre positioned at the 97th meridian west on the earth's longest barrier island known as Padre Island. During Post–World War II, the tidal inlet was dredged as a private channel differentiating North Padre Island better known as Padre Island National Seashore and South Padre Island. The navigable waterway was channeled during the late 1950s ceremoniously cresting the intertidal zone of the Gulf of Mexico by September 1957 on the Texas Gulf Coast.

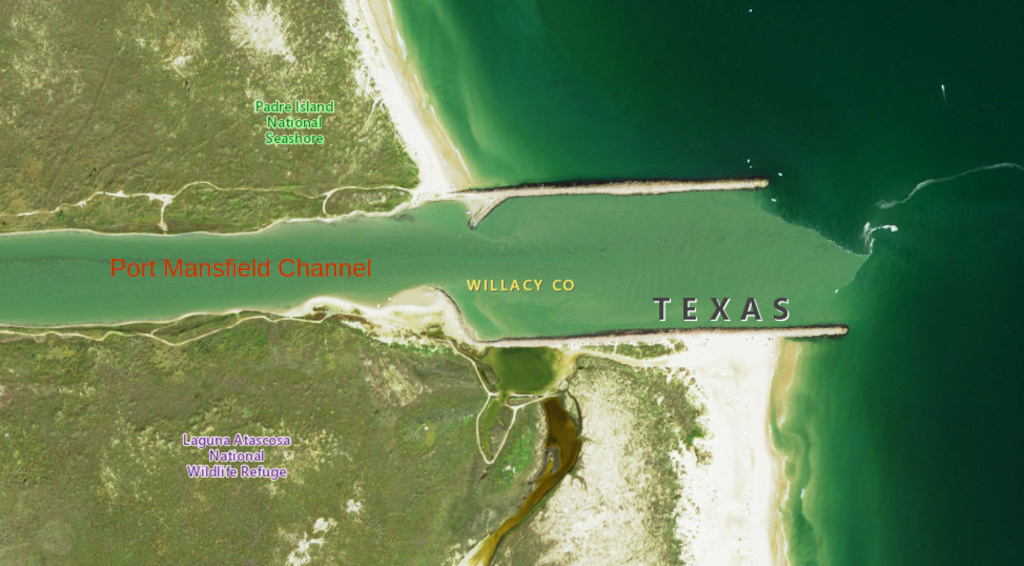
Mansfield Channel Jetties

The marginal sea inlet was defined by wave-dissipating concrete blocks similarly referred to as tetrapods protracting into the Gulf of Mexico at Padre Island. The breakwater structure was severely dilapidated during the 1957 Atlantic hurricane season with the Bay of Campeche spawning Hurricane Audrey and Tropical Storm Esther engulfing the existing jetty harbor entrance on Padre Island.

In 1962, the United States Army Corps of Engineers devised an expansive coastal engineered jetty system resiliently controlling coastal sediment transport, longshore drift, and shoaling during diverse gravity wave, wind wave, and inimical oceanic wave dispersion. The breakwater jetties were constructed with granite boulders situated as an eastern protrusion of 580 yards (530 m) and 825 yards (754 m) from the Padre Island shoreline into the Gulf of Mexico continental margin. The granite piers have a divisionary distance of 315 yards (288 m) permitting navigable transit passage from the brackish water of the Laguna Madre to the easterly Gulf of Mexico horizon. The coastal management framework was collaterally conformable given the imminent intervals of low-pressure weather systems and storm surges charged by the gradient intensity of tropical cyclones encroaching the Texas seacoast.

== History ==
During the 1940s, the state of Texas and the United States commenced surveying the Laguna Madre-Padre Island coastal basin for a conducive estuary landing seeking to proportion the maritime transport of the Gulf Intracoastal Waterway. The intracoastal waterway and Laguna Madre-Padre Island basin observation determined the anonymous fish camp known as Red Fish Landing to be an adaptable and practical vicinity for a waterfront berth. The Red Fish Bay locality sustained a nautical mid-point considering the distance of 85 miles (137 km) from Corpus Christi, Texas and 35 miles (56 km) from Brownsville, Texas.

In 1949, the 81st United States Congress reached a consensus regarding the Rivers and Harbors Act of 1950 as enacted into law by 33rd President of the United States Harry Truman on May 17, 1950. The Act of Congress authorized the waterfront domain known as Red Fish Landing to be unanimously entitled as Port Mansfield as an honorary acknowledgment of Joseph J. Mansfield. The inland port would serve the public good of the ecotone basin as a water vessel berth for future decades.

During the 1950s, United States House of Representatives and United States Senate congressional sessions appointed Public works committee hearings furthering the fact-finding with regards to the waterway project of the Laguna Madre-Padre Island basin. The legislative hearings supported congressional oversight concerning the navigability of the Gulf Intracoastal Waterway, Laguna Madre, and the continuation of estuaries of Texas to the Port of Brownsville and South Bay at the Mexico–United States border.

Padre Island, Texas

Climate chart (precipitation, max. and min. temperature)
J	F	M	A	M	J	J	A	S	O	N	D
1 73 51	3.5 72 54	3 77 57	0.2 81 62	1.9 84 69	1.2 91 74	3 94 75	1.2 95 74	6.3 94 73	5.5 85 66	3.4 80 57	2.2 70 45
- █ Average max. and min. temperatures in °F
- █ Precipitation totals in inches
- Source: NOAA National Centers for Environmental Information
Metric conversion
J	F	M	A	M	J	J	A	S	O	N	D
26 23 11	88 22 12	76 25 14	5.8 27 17	48 29 21	29 33 23	77 34 24	30 35 23	160 34 23	140 29 19	86 27 14	56 21 7
- █ Average max. and min. temperatures in °C
- █ Precipitation totals in mm

== See also ==
- Laguna Atascosa National Wildlife Refuge
- Lower Rio Grande Valley National Wildlife Refuge
- Mansfield Cut Underwater Archeological District
- Texas barrier islands
