= National Register of Historic Places listings in Kleberg County, Texas =

Location of Kleberg County in Texas

This is a list of the National Register of Historic Places listings in Kleberg County, Texas.

This is intended to be a complete list of properties and districts listed on the National Register of Historic Places in Kleberg County, Texas. There are one National Historic Landmark district and five individual properties listed on the National Register in the county. One individually listed property is a State Antiquities Landmark while two others are Recorded Texas Historic Landmarks. The district includes additional Recorded Texas Historic Landmarks.

This National Park Service list is complete through NPS recent listings posted March 6, 2026.

== Current listings ==
The locations of National Register properties and districts may be seen in a mapping service provided.

	Name on the Register	Image	Date listed	Location	City or town	Description
1	Dunn Ranch, Novillo Line Camp	Dunn Ranch, Novillo Line Camp	October 1, 1974 (#74000277)	S of Corpus Christi in Padre Island National Seashore; 27°27′42″N 97°17′05″W	Corpus Christi	
2	King Ranch	King Ranch	October 15, 1966 (#66000820)	Kingsville and its environs 27°31′07″N 97°55′01″W	Kingsville	Includes Recorded Texas Historic Landmarks; extends into Kenedy, Nueces, and Willacy counties
3	Henrietta M. King High School	Henrietta M. King High School	May 9, 1983 (#83003145)	400 W. King Ave. 27°31′00″N 97°52′22″W	Kingsville	Recorded Texas Historic Landmark
3	Kingsville Downtown Historic District	Kingsville Downtown Historic District	October 15, 2018 (#100002845)	Roughly bound by E Yoakum & E King Aves., N 12th St. & UPRR, 27°31′00″N 97°52′00″W	Kingsville	Includes Recorded Texas Historic Landmarks
4	Kleberg County Courthouse	Kleberg County Courthouse	May 10, 2010 (#10000250)	700 E Kleberg Ave. 27°31′00″N 97°51′34″W	Kingsville	State Antiquities Landmark
5	Nance-Jones House	Nance-Jones House	November 21, 2006 (#06001064)	426 E. Johnston Ave. 27°30′39″N 97°51′48″W	Kingsville	
6	John B. Ragland Mercantile Company Building	John B. Ragland Mercantile Company Building	January 21, 1993 (#92001820)	201 E. Kleberg Ave. 27°30′59″N 97°52′03″W	Kingsville	

== See also ==
- National Register of Historic Places listings in Texas
- List of National Historic Landmarks in Texas
- Recorded Texas Historic Landmarks in Kleberg County
