= Ragland House (Little Rock, Arkansas) =

Historic house in Arkansas, United States

- U.S. National Register of Historic Places
- U.S. Historic district – Contributing property
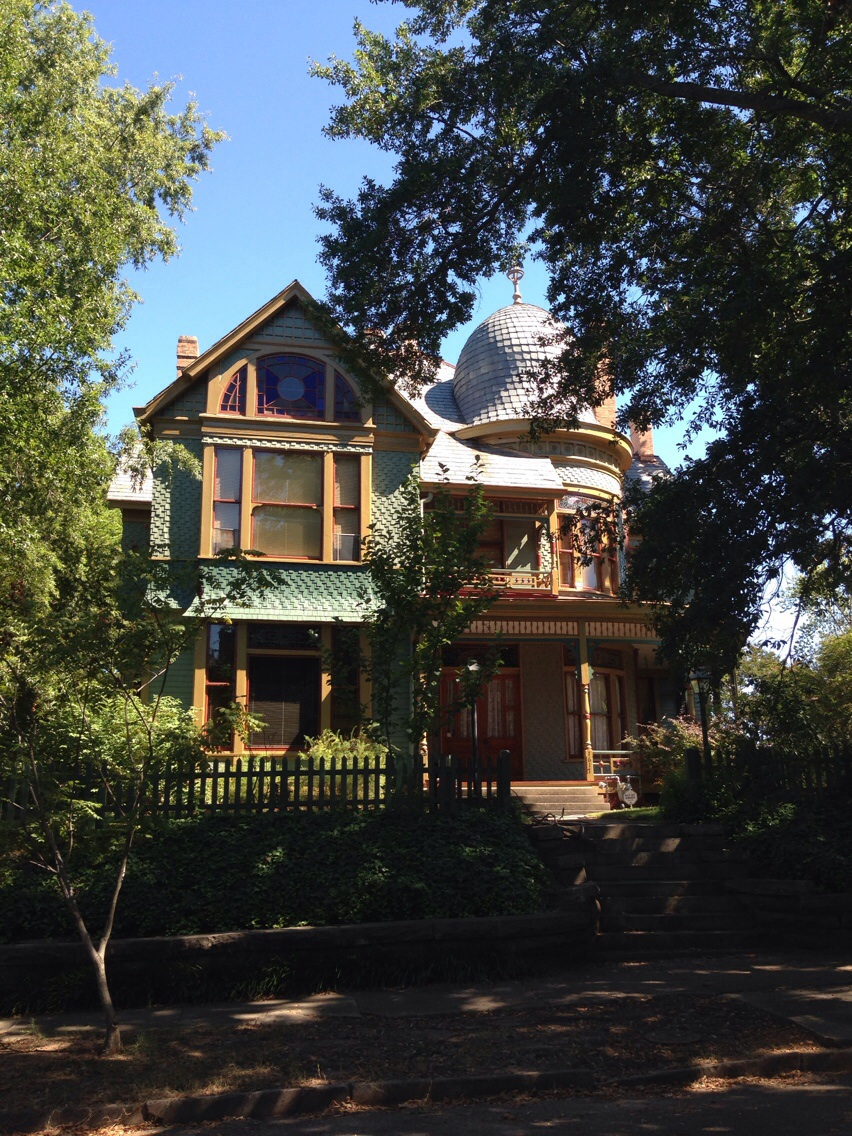

- Location within Arkansas Location within the United States
- Location: 1617 S Center St., Little Rock, Arkansas
- Coordinates: 34°43′59.32″N 92°16′32.22″W
- Architect: Charles L. Thompson
- Part of: Governor's Mansion Historic District (1988 enlargement) (ID88000631)
- MPS: Thompson, Charles L., Design Collection TR
- NRHP reference No.: 77000271

Significant dates
- Added to NRHP: 06/17/1977
- Designated CP: May 19, 1988

The Ragland House is a historic house at 1617 South Center Street in Little Rock, Arkansas. It is a 2 1/2-story wood-frame structure, with asymmetrical massing characteristic of the Queen Anne period. Its exterior is elaborately decorated with bands of cut shingles on the second level, and a bulbed turret at one corner. A single-story porch wraps around the tower to the side, with a jigsawn valance and Stick style balustrade. Built about 1891–92, it is unusual as an early work of architect Charles L. Thompson, who is better known for more Colonial Revival designs. The house was built for Mr. and Mrs. William Ragland. After the Raglands moved, Mrs. Ragland's parents, Edmond and Henriette Urguhart lived there until his death in 1905.

== See also ==
- National Register of Historic Places listings in Little Rock, Arkansas
