= National Register of Historic Places listings in Kenedy County, Texas =

Location of Kenedy County in Texas

This is a list of the National Register of Historic Places listings in Kenedy County, Texas.

This is intended to be a complete list of properties and districts listed on the National Register of Historic Places in Kenedy County, Texas. There are two districts listed on the National Register in the county including one which is a National Historic Landmark.

This National Park Service list is complete through NPS recent listings posted March 21, 2025.

== Current listings ==
The publicly disclosed locations of National Register properties and districts may be seen in a mapping service provided.

	Name on the Register	Image	Date listed	Location	City or town	Description
1	King Ranch	King Ranch	October 15, 1966 (#66000820)	Kingsville and its environs 27°31′07″N 97°55′01″W	Kingsville	Extends into Kleberg, Nueces, and Willacy counties
2	Mansfield Cut Underwater Archeological District	Mansfield Cut Underwater Archeological District	January 21, 1974 (#74002083)	Address restricted	Port Isabel	Extends into Willacy County

== See also ==
- National Register of Historic Places listings in Texas
- List of National Historic Landmarks in Texas
- Recorded Texas Historic Landmarks in Kenedy County
