= National Register of Historic Places listings in La Salle County, Texas =

Location of La Salle County in Texas

This is a list of the National Register of Historic Places listings in La Salle County, Texas.

This is intended to be a complete list of properties and districts listed on the National Register of Historic Places in La Salle County, Texas. There are one district and two individual properties listed on the National Register in the county. One property is also a State Antiquities Landmark.

This National Park Service list is complete through NPS recent listings posted March 21, 2025.

== Current listings ==
The locations of National Register properties and districts may be seen in a mapping application provided.

	Name on the Register	Image	Date listed	Location	City or town	Description
1	Cotulla Downtown Historic District	Cotulla Downtown Historic District	April 16, 2013 (#13000177)	Roughly bounded by Kerr, Tilden, Market and Carrizo Sts. 28°26′08″N 99°14′12″W	Cotulla	Includes the La Salle County Courthouse.
2	Cotulla Ranch		June 13, 2014 (#14000342)	1 mi. W. of jct. of I-35 & Crockett St. 28°26′25″N 99°16′04″W	Cotulla vicinity	
3	La Salle County Courthouse	La Salle County Courthouse	July 11, 2007 (#07000690)	101 Courthouse Square; 28°26′08″N 99°14′12″W	Cotulla	State Antiquities Landmark; part of Cotulla Downtown Historic District
4	Welhausen School and Florita Plaza		September 23, 2021 (#100007001)	204 East Lane St. 28°25′50″N 99°13′43″W	Cotulla	

== See also ==
- National Register of Historic Places listings in Texas
- Recorded Texas Historic Landmarks in La Salle County

== See also ==
Media related to National Register of Historic Places in La Salle County, Texas at Wikimedia Commons
