= Old Lyford High School =

- U.S. National Register of Historic Places
- Recorded Texas Historic Landmark
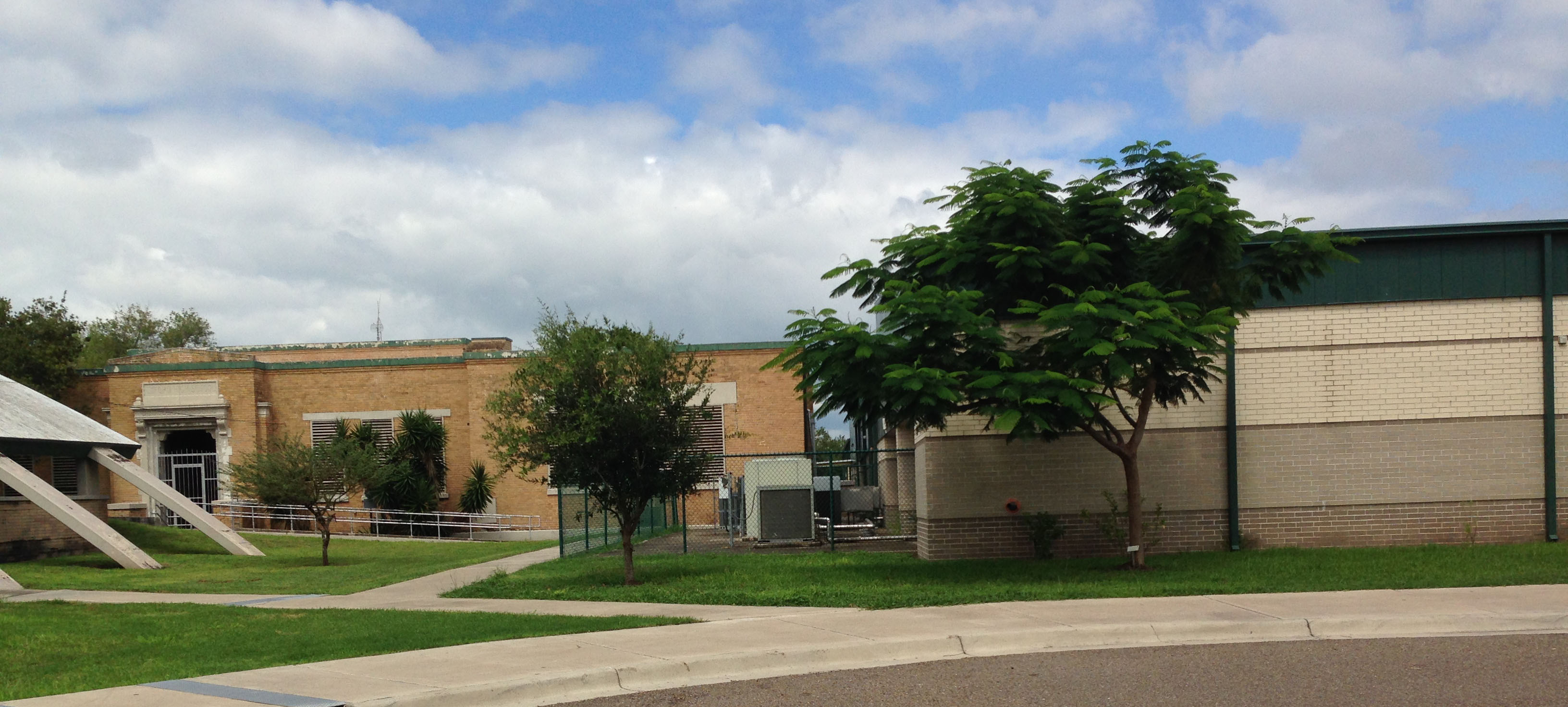
- Old Lyford High School in 2014

- Location within Texas Location within the United States
- Location: High School Circle; Lyford, Texas
- Coordinates: 26°24′36″N 97°47′47″W
- Area: less than 1 acre (0.40 ha)
- Built: 1923
- Built by: Roland Moore
- Architect: Smith & Kelly
- Architectural style: Neoclassical
- NRHP reference No.: 85002770
- RTHL No.: 3760

Significant dates
- Added to NRHP: 7 November 1985
- Designated RTHL: 1985

The Old Lyford High School is a historic school building in Lyford, Texas. Built in 1923 as the first high school in Willacy County it was designed by the architectural firm Smith & Kelly. It was added to the National Register of Historic Places and designated a Recorded Texas Historic Landmark in 1985.

== History ==
On 22 June 1922 the bond issue to build a new high school held by the Lyford Board of Trustees passed by a landslide of 64 to 4. The design by Smith & Kelly of San Antonio" (or Galveston) was approved by the board on 6 January 1923 and a contract for construction of the new school was awarded to Roland Moore of Donna, Texas on 1 April 1923 for US$35,000. Formal opening ceremonies were held 29 February 1924 presided over by the Raymondville lodge of Masons. Students came from Lyford and the surrounding communities including, Sebastian, Turner Tract and Stockholm. They were transported by trucks as these were the only vehicles that could traverse the rough dirt roads at the time. The school auditorium hosted all high school graduations from 1924 to 1958 when a new high school was built. With the completion of the new high school Old Lyford High School became Lyford Junior High until 1983 when another new school was built. An Official Texas Historical Marker signifies the school's designation as a Recorded Texas Historic Landmark.

== Building ==
The one story building is constructed of tawny brick with cast stone trim and has a T-plan shape. Located just to the west of the city reservoir on flat land, landscaped with palm and elm trees the school faces south. The facade is approximately 129 feet (39.3 m) while the north wing extends 131 feet (39.9 m). In the original plan five classrooms filled the head of the T while the auditorium was in the north wing. The entry is the centerpiece of a five part composition. The only ornamentation is on this elevation and includes cast stone details around and above a recessed entrance. A pedimented cornice above the door has an entablature carved to read "Lyford High School". The flanking inner bays have three windows each with 2 over 3 double hung sash. The end bays project as does the entry bay, the former with five windows in the same 2 over 3 pattern. A massive cast stone lintel spans the windows of each outer bay.

The classroom block (the head of the T) is identical on the east and west elevations. Each has a central set of doorways framed with monumental brick and a window bay with five windows to north of the doors. The rear wing is less ornamented having three doors and five windows on each side.

== Interior and Changes ==
The interior has sustained some water damage but retains much of the original plan and details. The classroom block has a central hallway terminating in the doors on the east and west sides. Doorways with transom windows lead to the classrooms on either side as do ventilation windows. This hallway is lined with student lockers. The building's wooden windows were replaced in 1949 with steel frame windows that duplicated the original design. The auditorium originally occupied the north wing which was remodeled in 1958 to accommodate an additional five classrooms and a teacher's lounge. Metal canopies have been added to the sides of the north wing which did not remove any substantial building fabric.

== Gallery ==
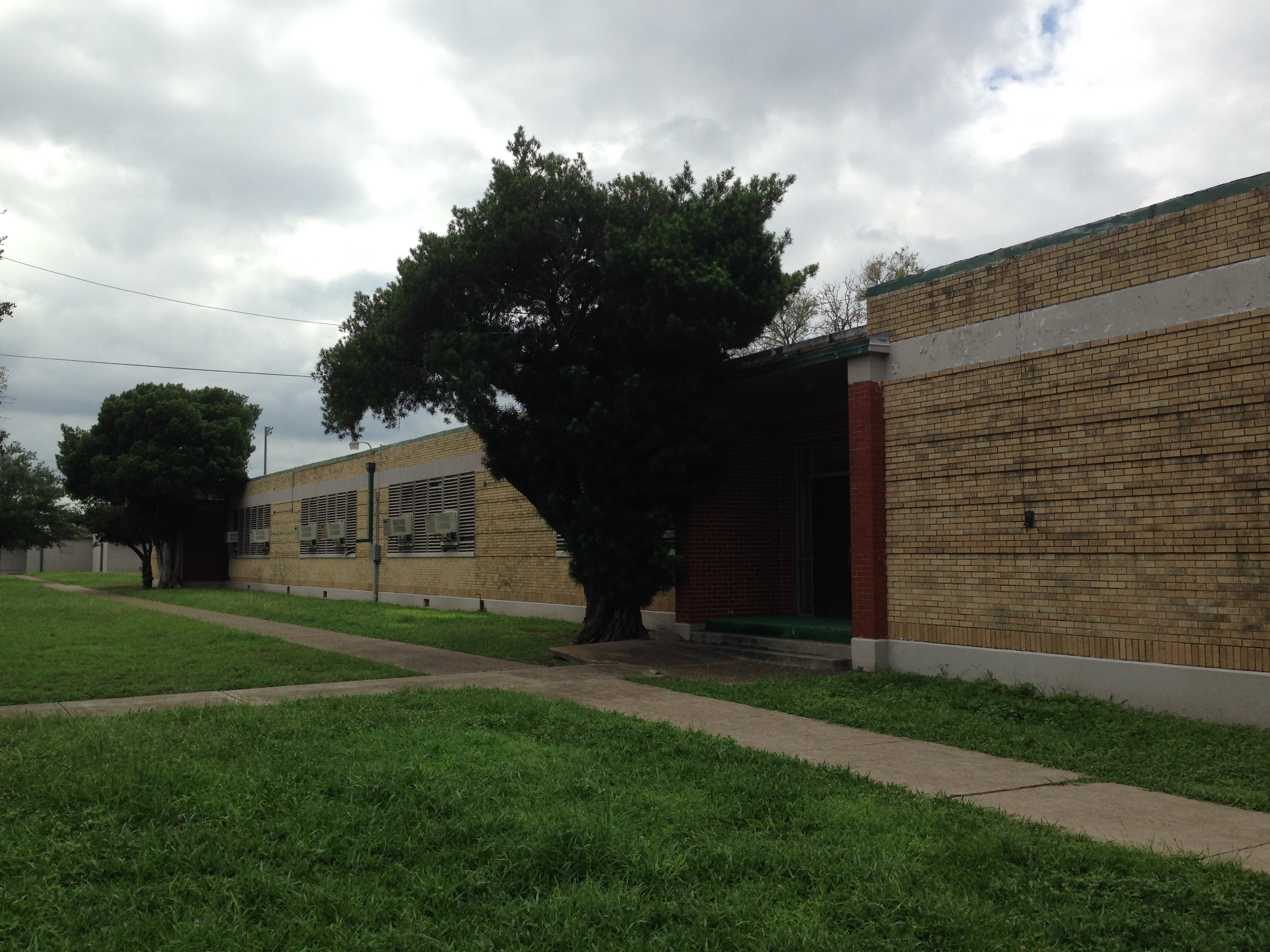

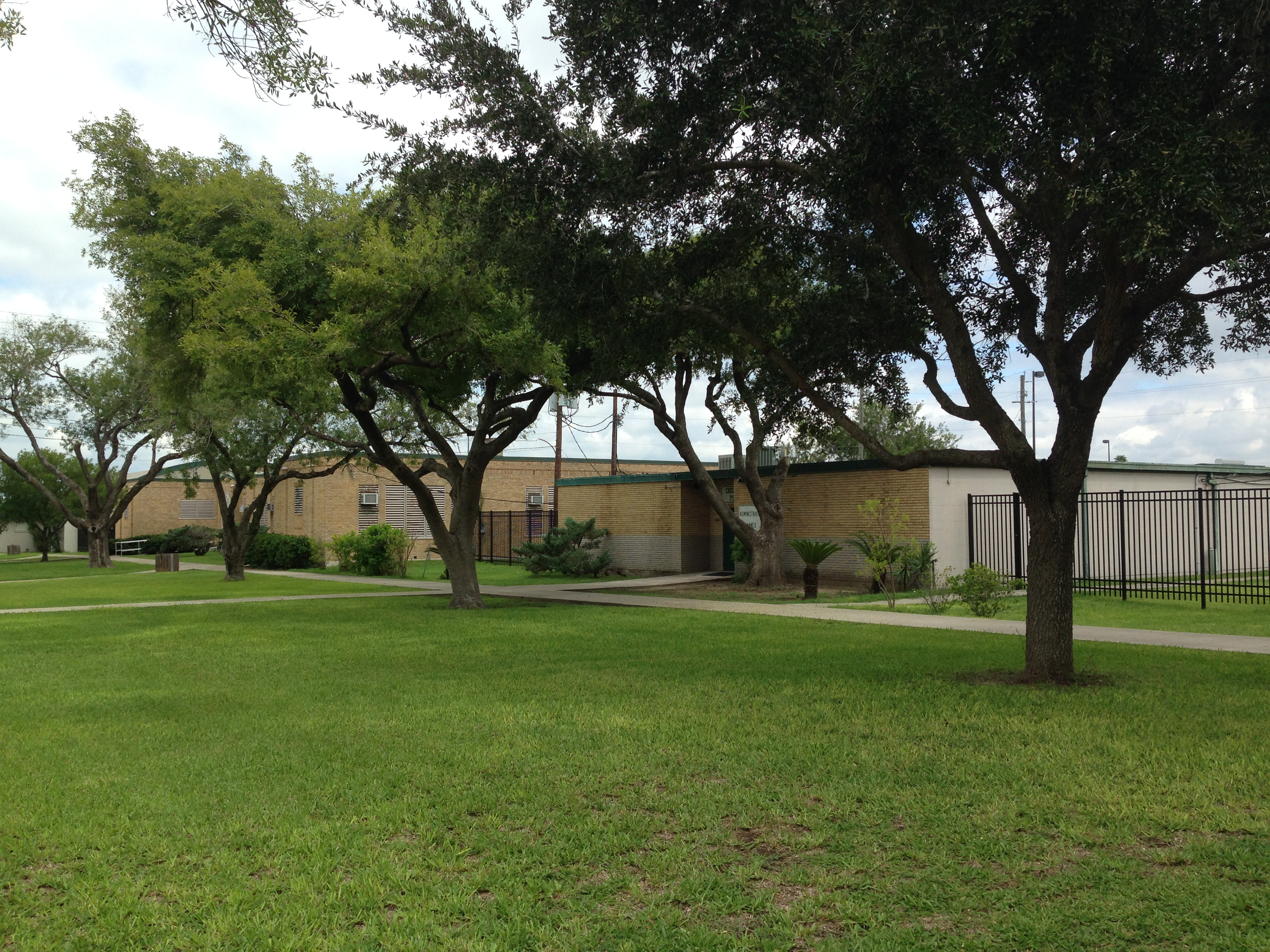

== See also ==
- National Register of Historic Places listings in Willacy County, Texas
- Recorded Texas Historic Landmarks in Willacy County
