= Willacy County Courthouse =

- U.S. National Register of Historic Places
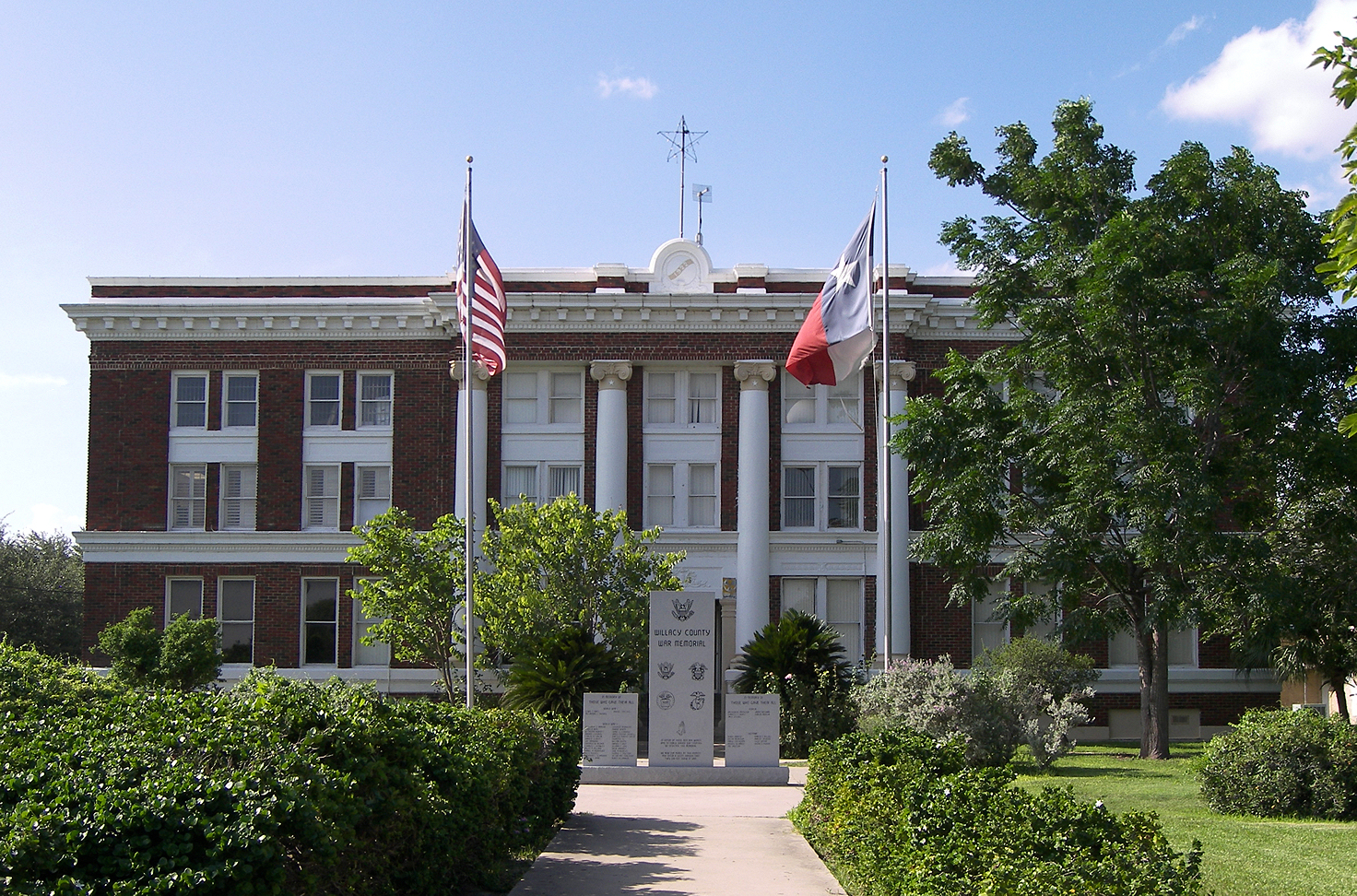
- The courthouse in 2008

- Location within Texas Location within the United States
- Location: 547 W. Hidalgo Avenue, Raymondville, Texas
- Coordinates: 26°28′57″N 97°47′15″W
- Area: less than one acre
- NRHP reference No.: 100000507
- Added to NRHP: January 17, 2017

The Willacy County Courthouse is a historic three-story building in Raymondville, Texas, and the former courthouse of Willacy County, Texas. It was designed in the Classical Revival architectural style, and it was the county courthouse until February 2015. It has been listed on the National Register of Historic Places since January 17, 2017.
