= Sherman Building (Corpus Christi, Texas) =

- U.S. National Register of Historic Places
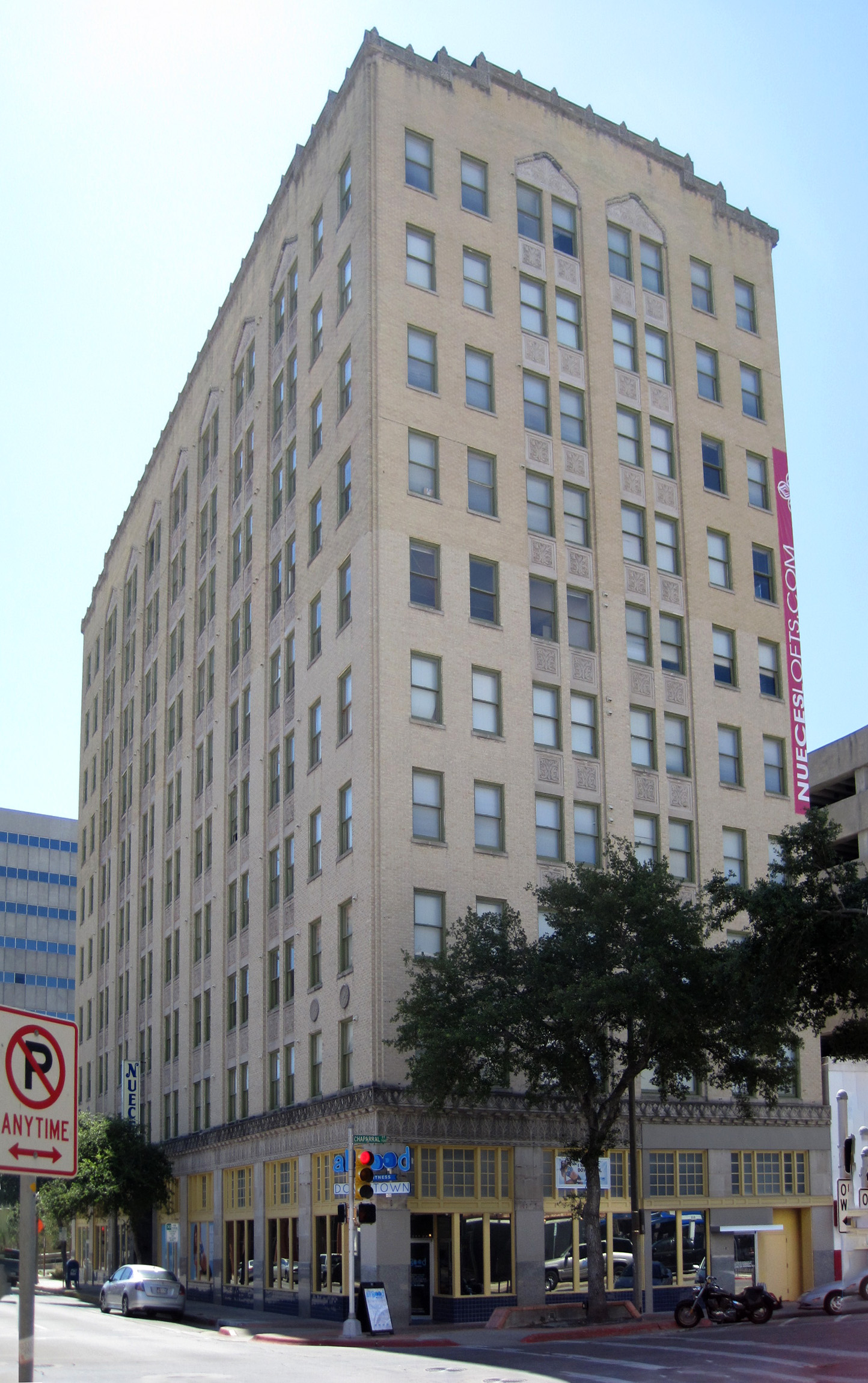
- The Sherman Building in 2011

- Location within Texas Location within the United States
- Location: 317 Peoples St. Corpus Christi, Texas
- Coordinates: 27°47′48″N 97°23′37″W
- Area: less than one acre
- Built: 1929-1930
- Built by: H.G. Sherman
- Architect: Hardy & Curran; Brock, Roberts, and Colley
- Architectural style: Skyscraper
- NRHP reference No.: 10000863
- Added to NRHP: October 28, 2010

The Sherman Building, also known as Nueces Lofts, is a historic building in Corpus Christi, Texas, U.S.. Its construction was completed in 1930. It has been listed on the National Register of Historic Places since October 28, 2010.

== See also ==
- National Register of Historic Places listings in Nueces County, Texas
