= Cotulla Ranch =

- U.S. National Register of Historic Places
- Location within Texas Location within the United States
- Location: 1 mile west of the intersection of I-35 and Crockett St., on private road, Cotulla, Texas
- Coordinates: 28°26′25″N 99°16′4″W
- Area: 5.89 acres (2.38 ha)
- Built: 1865
- Architect: Joseph Cotulla
- Architectural style: Mid 19th Century
- NRHP reference No.: 14000342
- Added to NRHP: June 13, 2014

The Cotulla Ranch is a historic ranch near Cotulla in La Salle County, Texas, U.S.. It was established in the 1860s by Joseph Cotulla, a Polish immigrant who served in the Union Army during the American Civil War. It has been listed on the National Register of Historic Places since June 13, 2014.

== See also ==
- National Register of Historic Places listings in La Salle County, Texas
