= Tarpon Inn =

- U.S. National Register of Historic Places
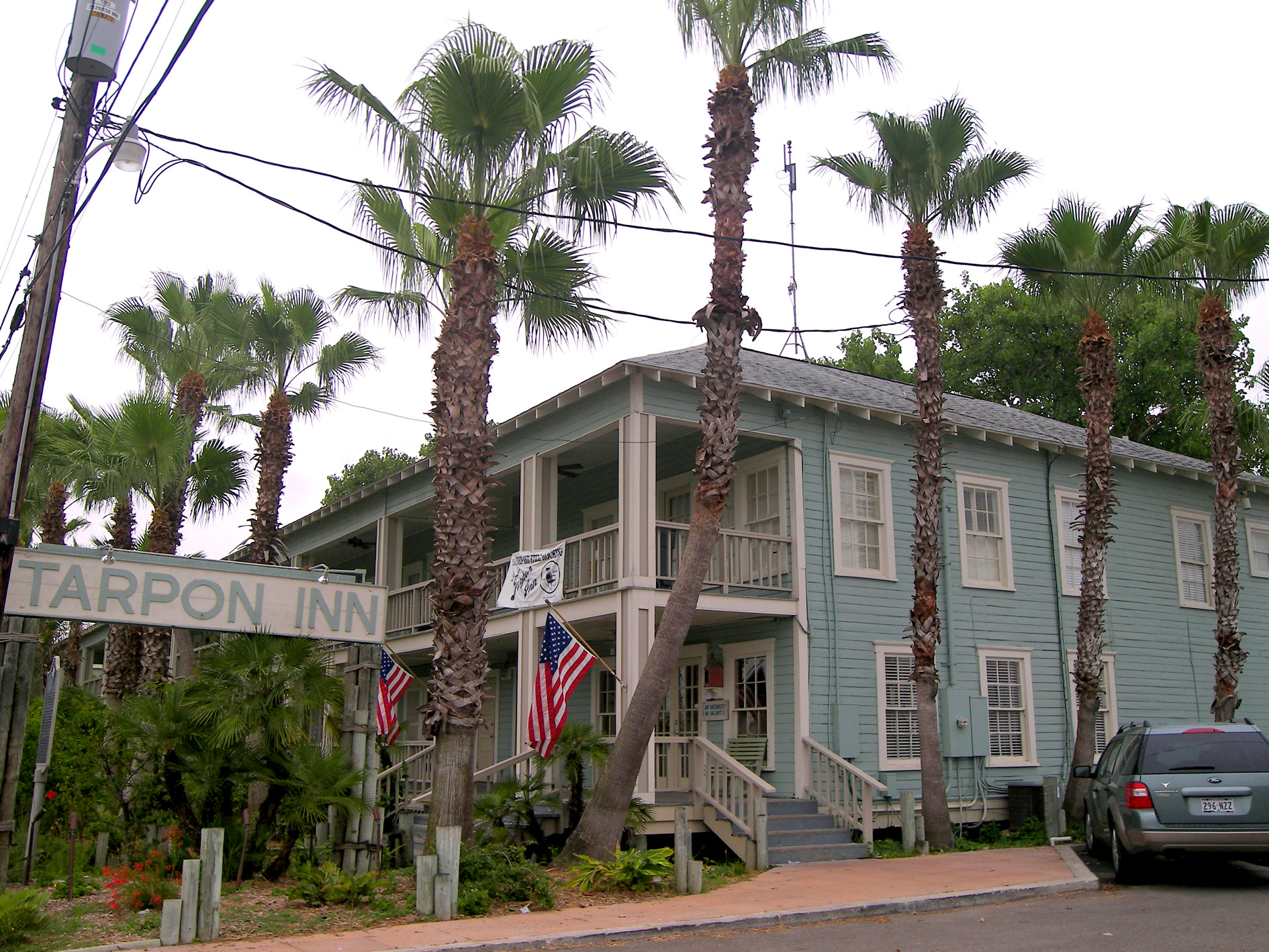
- The Tarpon Inn in 2007

- Location within Texas Location within the United States
- Location: 200 E. Cotter Ave. Port Aransas, Texas
- Coordinates: 27°50′14″N 97°3′35″W
- Area: less than one acre
- Built: 1925
- Architect: James M. Ellis
- Architectural style: Barracks
- NRHP reference No.: 79003002
- Added to NRHP: September 14, 1979

The Tarpon Inn is a historic hotel located in Port Aransas, Texas, United States that originally opened in 1886. The building was named after the tarpon sport fish that drew many anglers to the sea side city and Port Aransas was called Tarpon at the time. The building was added to the National Register of Historic Places on September 14, 1979.

The original Tarpon Inn was built in 1886 from surplus material that came from an old Civil War barracks. The building was destroyed by fire in 1900. Two new buildings were constructed in its place only to be ravaged by a hurricane in 1919 and its 12–15 foot storm surge. The larger building was completely destroyed, but the smaller building was reparable and continued to be used as a hotel until 1926.

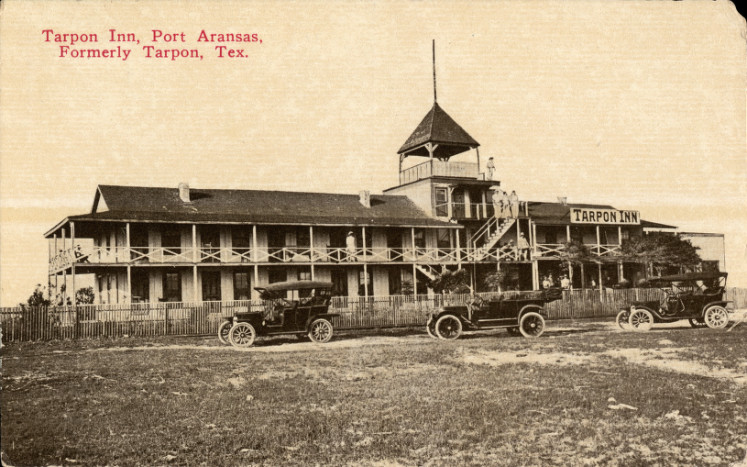
Tarpon Inn, Port Aransas, Texas (postcard, circa 1911-1924)

In 1923, James M. Ellis bought the property. In 1925, he built the structure that still stands today. He retained the barracks style as a homage to the original 1886 Tarpon Inn. To strengthen the building against future hurricanes, dozens of pine poles were sunk into 16 to 20 feet of concrete. The long poles extend up through the attic and the roof is anchored to these poles. When the new building opened, the old smaller building became the hotel's dining room.

After World War II, tarpon began to disappear from this section of the Texas coast. The Inn was sold in 1970 by the Ellis family after Hurricane Celia damaged the inn and the surrounding cities. The Inn was repaired and reopened by a new owner in 1975 and has again become a popular place for fishermen as well as tourists and business travelers.

The main lobby of the Tarpon Inn is adorned with over 7000 tarpon scales, each signed by the angler who landed the fish. The most famous scale is the one signed by Franklin D. Roosevelt, who fished off the Texas Coast in 1937, even though he did not actually stay at the Inn. Notable guests at the Inn include Clyde Beatty, Douglas Corrigan, Jesse Jones, Hedy Lamarr, Aimee Semple McPherson and Edward Teller. The travel writer and food critic Duncan Hines was married and spent his honeymoon at the Inn.

== See also ==
- National Register of Historic Places listings in Nueces County, Texas
