= Lyford, Texas =

- City
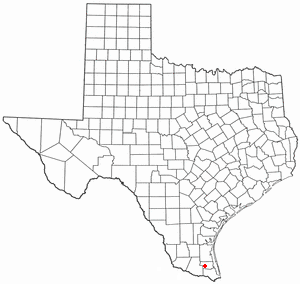
- Location of Lyford, Texas

- Coordinates: 26°24′40″N 97°47′24″W
- Country: United States
- State: Texas
- County: Willacy

Area
  - Total: 1.81 sq mi (4.68 km^{2})
  - Land: 1.75 sq mi (4.52 km^{2})
  - Water: 0.062 sq mi (0.16 km^{2})
- Elevation: 33 ft (10 m)

Population (2020)
  - Total: 2,249
  - Density: 1,290/sq mi (498/km^{2})
- Time zone: UTC-6 (Central (CST))
  - Summer (DST): UTC-5 (CDT)
- ZIP code: 78569
- Area code: 956
- FIPS code: 48-45228
- GNIS feature ID: 1340749
- Website: www.lyfordtx.us

Lyford is a city in Willacy County, Texas, United States. The population was 2,249 at the 2020 census. It may be included as part of the Brownsville–Harlingen–Raymondville and the Matamoros–Brownsville metropolitan areas.

== Geography ==
Lyford is located at 26°24'40" North, 97°47'24" West (26.411247, –97.789939).

According to the United States Census Bureau in 2000, the city had a total area of 1.1 square miles (2.8 km^{2}), of which 1.1 square miles (2.8 km^{2}) was land and 0.93% is water. Prior to the 2010 census, the city gained area by annexing the Bausell and Ellis CDP and part of the Lyford South CDP. The city's total area thus increased to 1.8 square miles (4.7 km^{2}), of which 1.7 square miles (4.4 km^{2}) is now land and 0.1 square miles (0.26 km^{2}) is water.

== Demographics ==
Historical population
Census	Pop.	Note	%±
1930	795		—
1940	891		12.1%
1950	1,473		65.3%
1960	1,554		5.5%
1970	1,425		−8.3%
1980	1,618		13.5%
1990	1,674		3.5%
2000	1,973		17.9%
2010	2,611		32.3%
2020	2,249		−13.9%
U.S. Decennial Census; 1850–1900 1910; 1920 1930 1940 1950 1960 1970 1980 1990 2000; 2010

=== 2020 census ===
As of the 2020 census, Lyford had a population of 2,249, 678 households, and 529 families residing in the city. The median age was 35.6 years, 27.7% of residents were under the age of 18, and 16.1% of residents were 65 years of age or older. For every 100 females there were 87.9 males, and for every 100 females age 18 and over there were 88.3 males age 18 and over.

97.0% of residents lived in urban areas, while 3.0% lived in rural areas.

There were 678 households in Lyford, of which 39.2% had children under the age of 18 living in them. Of all households, 49.4% were married-couple households, 14.3% were households with a male householder and no spouse or partner present, and 32.2% were households with a female householder and no spouse or partner present. About 18.9% of all households were made up of individuals and 8.9% had someone living alone who was 65 years of age or older.

There were 762 housing units, of which 11.0% were vacant. The homeowner vacancy rate was 1.3% and the rental vacancy rate was 9.6%.

Racial composition as of the 2020 census
Race	Number	Percent
White	828	36.8%
Black or African American	41	1.8%
American Indian and Alaska Native	19	0.8%
Asian	3	0.1%
Native Hawaiian and Other Pacific Islander	0	0.0%
Some other race	370	16.5%
Two or more races	988	43.9%
Hispanic or Latino (of any race)	2,150	95.6%

=== 2000 census ===
As of the census of 2000, there were 1,973 people, 562 households, and 472 families residing in the city. The population density was 1,844.5 inhabitants per square mile (712.2/km^{2}). There were 614 housing units at an average density of 574.0 per square mile (221.6/km^{2}). The racial makeup of the city was 63.20% White, 0.35% African American, 0.41% Native American, 0.00% Asian, 0.00% Pacific Islander, 33.05% from other races, and 2.99% from two or more races. 92.85% of the population were Hispanic or Latino of any race.

There were 562 households, out of which 49.1% had children under the age of 18 living with them, 64.9% were married couples living together, 16.4% had a female householder with no husband present, and 16.0% were non-families. 14.1% of all households were made up of individuals, and 8.7% had someone living alone who was 65 years of age or older. The average household size was 3.51 and the average family size was 3.89.

In the city, the population was spread out, with 34.0% under the age of 18, 10.4% from 18 to 24, 26.0% from 25 to 44, 18.4% from 45 to 64, and 11.3% who were 65 years of age or older. The median age was 30 years. For every 100 females, there were 87.5 males. For every 100 females age 18 and over, there were 83.3 males.

The median income for a household in the city was $25,521, and the median income for a family was $26,985. Males had a median income of $19,511 versus $16,827 for females. The per capita income for the city was $8,684. 30.6% of the population and 27.7% of families were below the poverty line. 34.2% of those under the age of 18 and 38.2% of those 65 and older were living below the poverty line.

== Government and infrastructure ==
The United States Postal Service operates the Lyford Post Office.

== Education ==
Lyford's public schools are operated by the Lyford Consolidated Independent School District. The National Register of Historic Places listed the Old Lyford High School building.

== Economy ==
Lyford's economic fortunes have been linked intimately with that of Mexico's after NAFTA went into effect on January 1, 1994. Prior to ratification of this agreement, economic activity in Lyford was centered on agriculture. Since then economic activity has diversified with the opening of a second convenience store.

In addition to the industrial activity, there is a retail sector that is dependent on purchases made by wealthy and middle-class Mexican consumers from Monterrey (connected to Reynosa by toll road) and Tampico. According to Cynthia Brown, director of UTPA's Center for Border Economic Studies, Mexicans invested $1.4 billion into the economy and paid for 41,000 jobs[1]. In 2003, the Rio Grande Valley showed a 13.3 percent increase from 2002 sales, topping $10 billion according to a report compiled by the Rio Grande Valley Partnership/Chamber of Commerce.
