= Sons of San Patricio Monument =

In Texas (US), on the National Register of Historic Places

- U.S. National Register of Historic Places
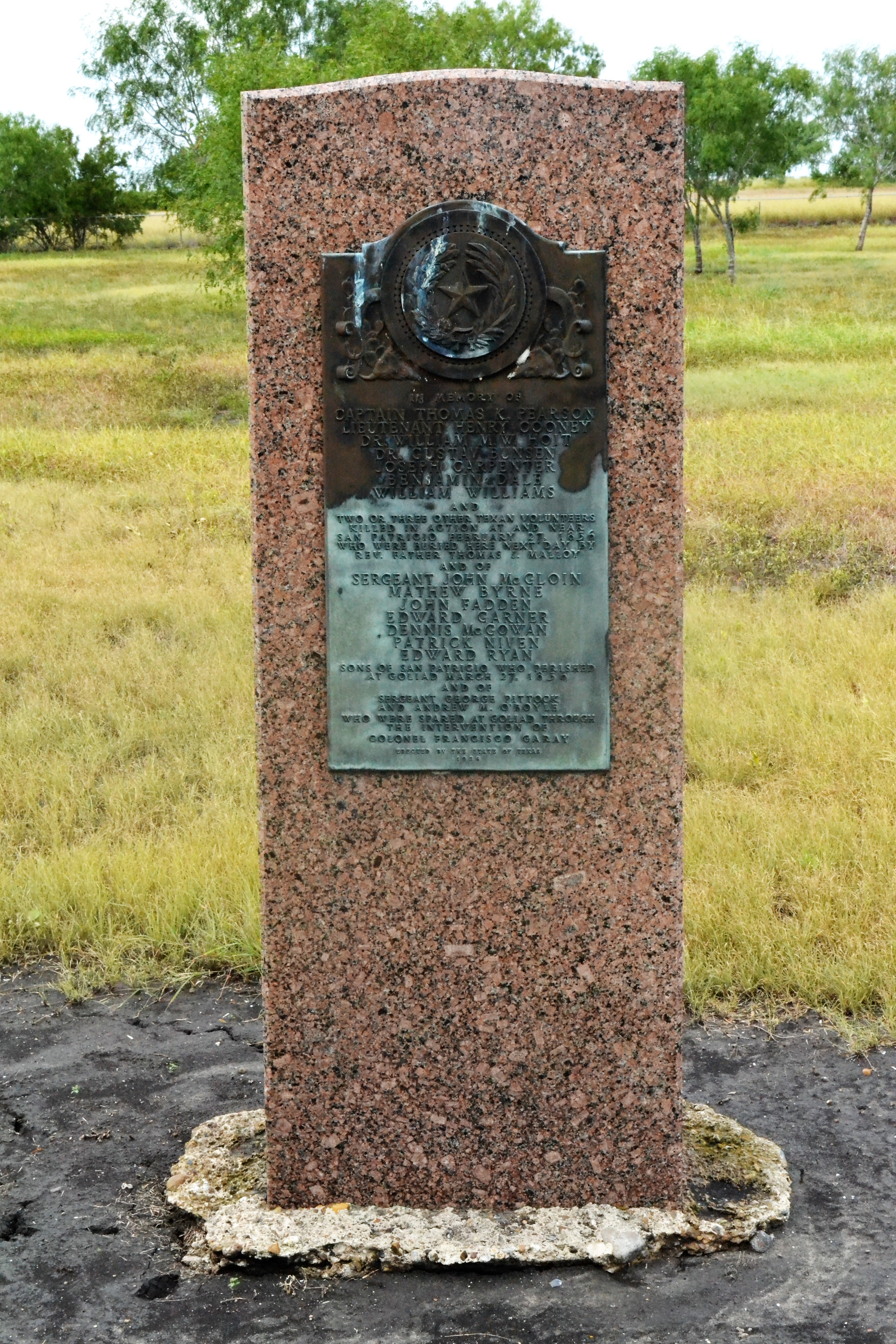
- The monument in 2018

- Location within Texas Location within the United States
- Location: Cty. Rd 1441 (21), Old San Patricio Cemetery, San Patricio, Texas
- Coordinates: 27°57′34″N 97°45′43″W
- Area: less than one acre
- Built: 1937
- MPS: Monuments and Buildings of the Texas Centennial MPS
- NRHP reference No.: 100002353
- Added to NRHP: April 19, 2018

The Sons of San Patricio Monument, in San Patricio, Texas, was erected in 1937. It was listed on the National Register of Historic Places in 2018.

It is located in the Old San Patricio Cemetery.

It was designed by sculptor Raoul Josset and architects Page & Southerland.

== See also ==
- San Patricio de Hibernia Monument
