= Old Nueces County Courthouse =

- U.S. National Register of Historic Places
- Recorded Texas Historic Landmark
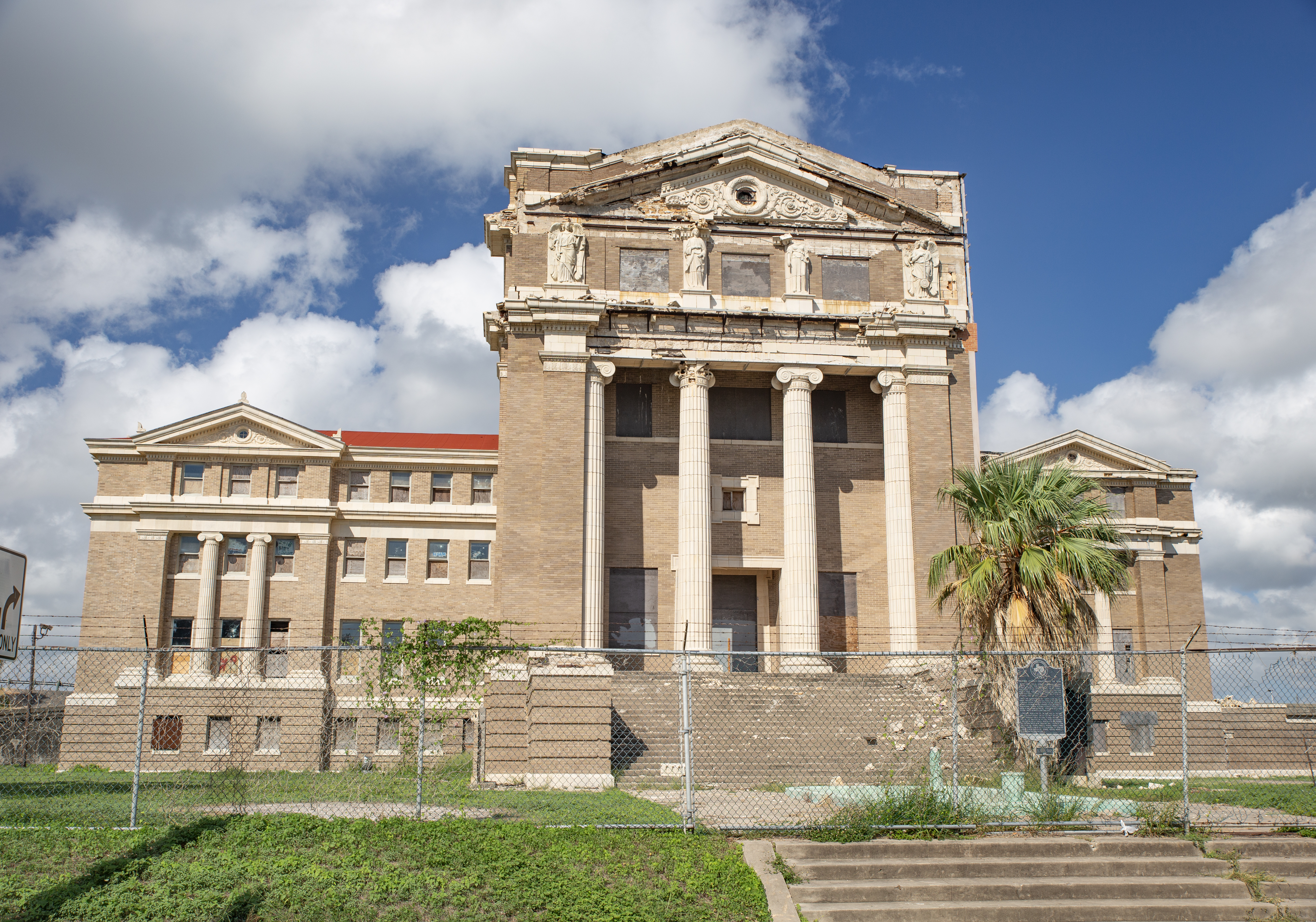
- Old Nueces County Courthouse (2023)

- Location within Texas Location within the United States
- Location: 1100 N Mesquite Street, Corpus Christi, Texas
- Coordinates: 27°48′06″N 97°23′45″W
- Area: 1 acre (0.40 ha)
- Built: 1914
- Architect: Harvey L. Page
- Architectural style: Classical Revival
- NRHP reference No.: 76002055
- Added to NRHP: June 24, 1976

The Old Nueces County Courthouse is a historic government building in downtown Corpus Christi, Texas, United States. All functions at the courthouse relocated to the current county courthouse just a few streets away. The old courthouse was listed on the National Register of Historic Places in 1976. There are currently ongoing efforts to restore the old courthouse, which is being worked on by county government. The efforts faded with enthusiasm in the late 1990's and successive government officials have advanced efforts to demolish it. The Texas Historic Commission removed preservation easements at the instance of county government agents and demolition is slated for 2026.

== History ==
Following high rates of crime throughout South Texas in 1853, three plots of land were purchased from Henry Lawrence McKinney in Corpus Christi for $300 (1853 USD). The first county courthouse was built on this land, with a second Courthouse being built next to the first in the mid-1870s. The third and current old county courthouse was fully completed by 1914, and cost more than $250,000.

In 1919, Robert Simpson, the inventor of the Saffir-Simpson Hurricane Wind Scale, survived the 1919 Florida Keys Hurricane inside the old courthouse. Outside a 16–foot storm surge ravaged the rest of Corpus Christi. The hurricane caused catastrophic damage in the city with debris scattered across the downtown area, and roughly $20 million (1919 USD) in damage. The dead were laid in front of the courthouse so families could identify them. Being fascinated by the storm, Simpson later teamed up with Herbert Saffir to create the Saffir-Simpson scale in the 1970s.

In the early 1930s, a six-floor addition was added to the western side of the courthouse. Newer additions were added during the 1960s and 1970s, but have since been torn down. At this time, the building began to deteriorate. An old newspaper, pre-1900 liquor bottles, and a taxidermied diamondback rattlesnake were found under large amounts of dirt under the courthouse steps. During September 1966, a five-year-old girl fell through a dropped ceiling on a balcony at the courthouse. She plunged 12 feet and was frightened, but was fortunately unharmed. A similar incident occurred with a 14-year-old boy just a month earlier.

A new courthouse was considered in a bond in 1957 even before the buildings decline, however, the bond was not passed. After the structure began to fall apart, a new bond was introduced in 1972 which included the construction of a new courthouse. On September 9 of that year, the bond was approved by voters in the city. The old courthouse was closed once the new and current courthouse was completed in 1977.

Since then there have been some attempts to restore the building. In August 2018, plans were made to transform the old courthouse into a 159-room hotel with a restaurant and bar, meeting spaces, and parking. The cost of this renovation was estimated to total $52 million (2018 USD). However, the plan failed as the company attempting the renovations did not want to pay the $1.5 million worth of taxes owed by the courthouse's previous owner. In September 2019, Nueces County commissioners began to work on restoring the courthouse by beginning structural assessments. In December 2020, officials in the county were informed that the structure could be saved.

== Architecture ==
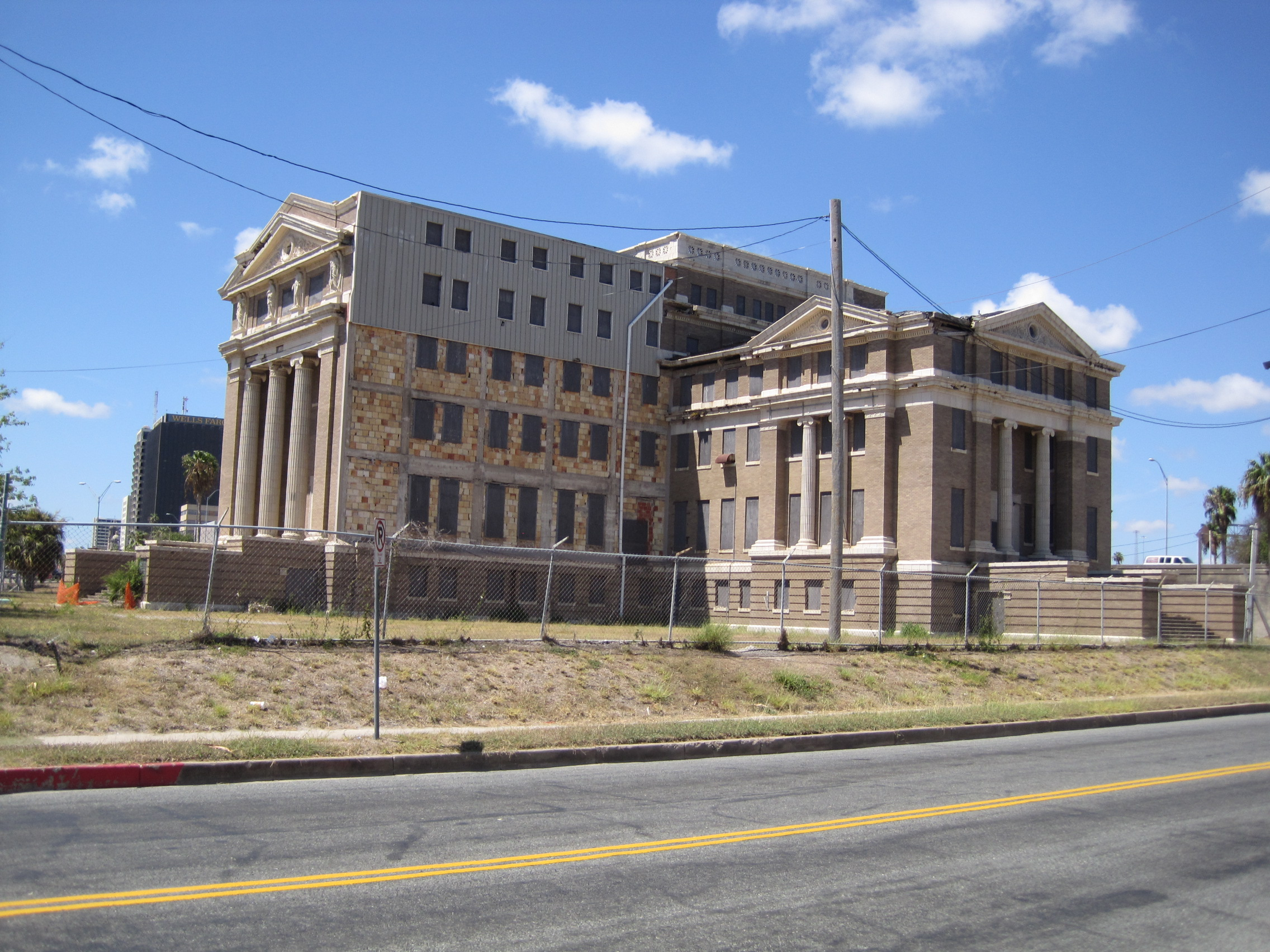
The Old Nueces County Courthouse as seen from Belden Street

The courthouse was designed by Harvey L. Page in 1913. The style of the structure was Classical Revival. The building is six stories tall, the reinforced steel structure is covered in soft gray brick and white classical terra cotta trim. A red roof tops the building, which was initially covered with Ludowici English tile from the company's Coffeyville, Kansas, plant.

In the main facade facing Corpus Christi Bay is accessed by a large flight of steps, making the main entrance on the second floor. The entrance wing is decorated by colonnades in antas, along with brick pilasters. On top of the cornice are three terra cotta figures, each separated by a window. The entrance is topped off with a pediment, decorated by a terra cotta ornament, a circular window, and a pedimented parapet.

A similar theme coats the exterior of the north and south wings. On the ground level, the south wing entrance can be found. The central entrance is decorated by a pedimented porch roof which is held up by two caryatids. The north wing entrance is a mostly plain basement level entryway.

Nearly each floor served a purpose at the courthouse. The basement was used as storage space for mechanical equipment. The second floor housed the county courtroom and offices of county officials. The third floor was made up of the three district courts. The fourth floor consisted of offices, while the fifth and sixth floors were jails. Air space containing insulation was placed in between fourth and fifth floor to prevent noise entering the courthouse from the jail.

== See also ==
- Bexar County Courthouse
