= John B. Ragland Mercantile Company Building =

- U.S. National Register of Historic Places
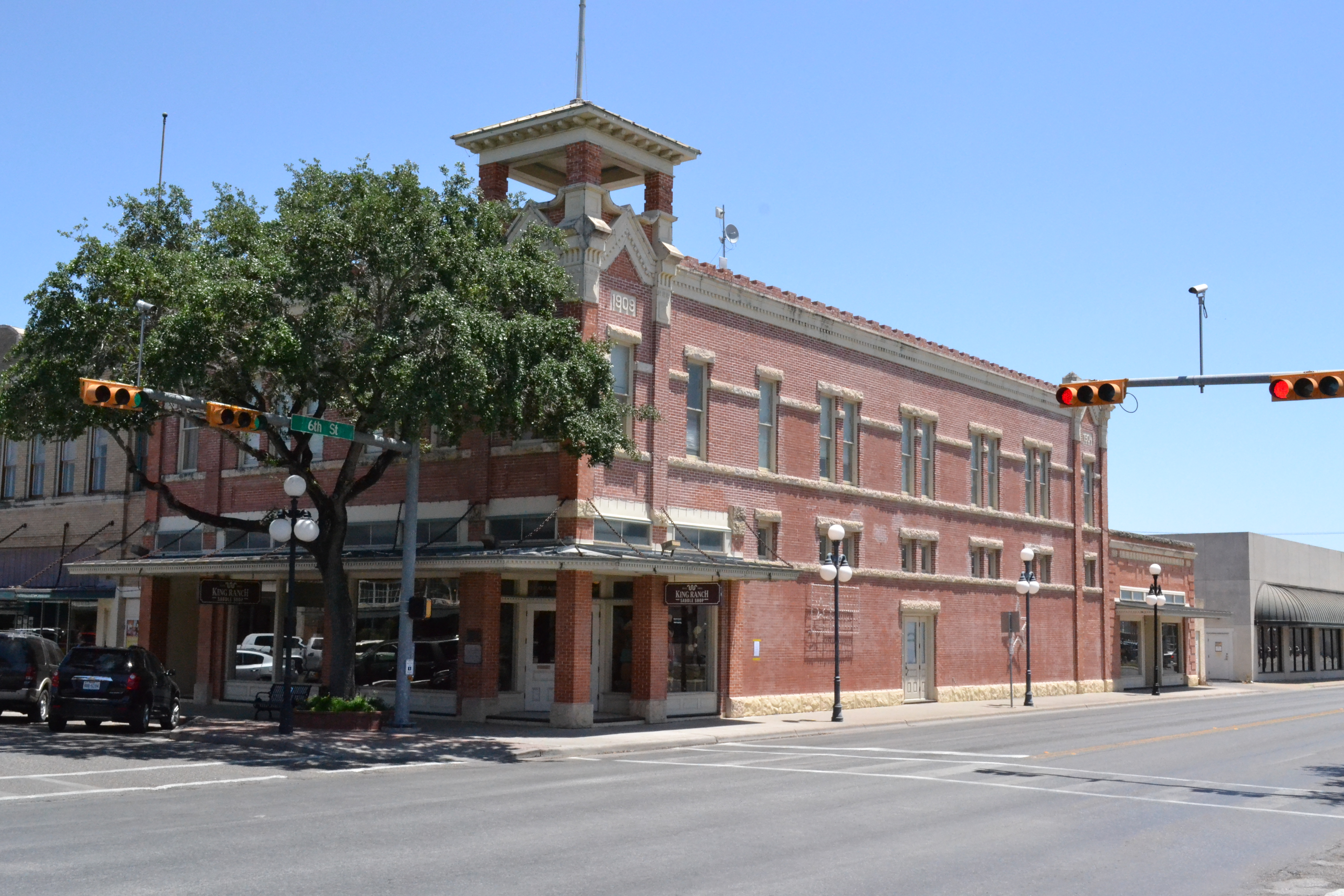
- Ragland Building in 2014

- Location within Texas Location within the United States
- Location: 201 E. Kleberg Ave., Kingsville, Texas
- Coordinates: 27°30′58″N 97°51′57″W
- Area: less than one acre
- Built: 1909
- Architect: Jules Carl Leffland
- Architectural style: Italianate
- NRHP reference No.: 92001820
- Added to NRHP: January 21, 1993

The John B. Ragland Mercantile Company Building, also known as Raglands, is a historic building at 201 E. Kleberg Ave. in Kingsville, Texas. It was designed by Jules Leffland and was built in 1909 to replace a small frame store built by John Ragland in 1904. He operated the store until his death in 1908. Before he died, Ragland sold the lots and store and it was incorporated as the John B. Ragland Mercantile Co. The store sold dry goods, millinery, suits, pants, shirts, cloaks, skirts, hats and shoes.

In 1943, the company was dissolved, and ownership was transferred to Robert J. Kleberg & Co. In 1950, that entity was dissolved and it was sold to King Ranch Inc., as a new subsidiary known as Ragland Mercantile Co. It was also remodeled that same year, receiving a new facade, new interiors, new fixtures and new storefronts, including the first escalator in South Texas, according to town historian Bruce Cheeseman. The store closed in 1979. After a $1.2 million restoration project, that restored much of the original building, it reopened in 1990 as the King Ranch Saddle Shop.

In 1991, the building received two awards from the Texas Downtown Association for best store interior and best commercial restoration, and in 1992, the Texas Historical Foundation gave the building its Josiah Wheat Award of Merit, for an "outstanding historical restoration project". It was listed on the National Register of Historic Places in 1993.

Its design is mainly Italianate but has other architectural elements including Gothic Revival and Mission Revival. Its two public facades are brick and limestone.

== See also ==
- National Register of Historic Places listings in Kleberg County, Texas
- Recorded Texas Historic Landmarks in Kleberg County
