= Mansfield Cut Underwater Archeological District =

Underwater archaeological site

- U.S. National Register of Historic Places
- U.S. Historic district
- Location within Texas Location within the United States
- Nearest city: Port Isabel, Texas
- Coordinates: 26.57363°N 97.25272°W
- Area: 2,500 acres (1,000 ha)
- Built: 1553
- NRHP reference No.: 74002083
- Added to NRHP: January 21, 1974

The Mansfield Cut Underwater Archeological District is an 18.31-acre (74,100 m^{2}) area located near the city of Port Mansfield, Texas, United States, in the waters off Kenedy County and Willacy County, Texas. Located offshore in the Gulf of Mexico near the Port Mansfield Cut, the underwater archaeological site is the location of the Mansfield Cut Wrecks and has been listed on the National Register of Historic Places since 1974.

== Mansfield Cut Wrecks ==
The Mansfield Cut Underwater Archeological District contains three Spanish shipwrecks caused by a 1554 storm off the southern Texas Gulf Coast near the Mansfield Cut. While the exact location of the site is unpublished, the three shipwrecks were found near the Padre Island National Seashore. The Mansfield Cut Wrecks are listed in the National Register as part of an archeological district of national significance.

=== Story ===
On April 9, 1554, four Spanish naos departed from San Juan de Ulúa bound for Havana, Cuba, the first leg of a return trip to Spain. The ships were loaded with precious metals and similar cargo. A storm off the coast of Cuba blew them across the Gulf of Mexico to the coast of Texas. On April 29, three of the ships ran aground with approximately 300 people aboard. The fourth ship, the San Andrés, reached Havana but was too damaged to repair. Few of the survivors made it back to Mexico but there are records of a salvage operation during the summer of 1554 which retrieved about half of the cargo.

== Remains ==
=== Santa Maria de Yciar ===
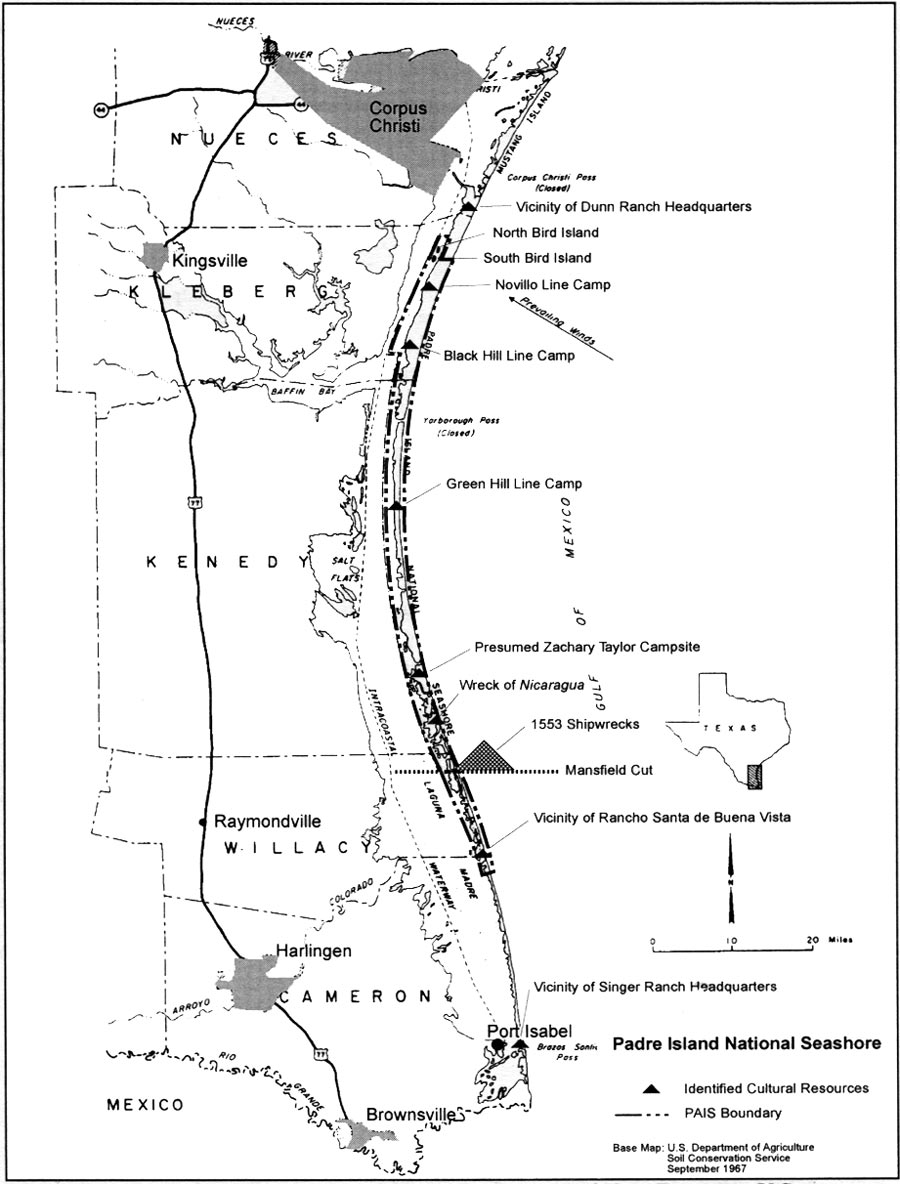
Map of Cultural Resources from Early Occupation and Use, September 1967. The 1553 [sic] Shipwrecks site marks the protected area.

The scattered remains of the wooden vessel named Santa Maria de Yciar are buried off Padre Island, Texas near Mansfield. This vessel, which wrecked in 1554 when part of a treasure flota, lies within the Padre Island National Seashore. The anchor of the Santa Maria de Yciar was found when the Mansfield Channel was dredged in the late 1950s. The original anchor is located on the campus of Texas A&M University–Corpus Christi. A life-size replica may be found in the visitor center of the Padre Island National Seashore. The Santa Maria de Yciar is owned by the State of Texas, Texas Antiquities Committee, and managed by the U.S. Government, National Park Service.

=== Espíritu Santo ===
The scattered remains of the wooden vessel named Espíritu Santo (Spanish for "Holy Ghost") are buried off Padre Island near Port Mansfield. This vessel, which wrecked in 1554 when part of a treasure flota, lies within the Padre Island National Seashore. The Espíritu Santo was discovered by Vida Lee Connor while scuba diving in 1966. A salvage operation by a private company in 1967 was the subject of a court case and was responsible for the Antiquities Code of Texas, passed by the state legislature in 1969.

=== San Esteban ===
The scattered remains of the wooden vessel named San Esteban are buried off Padre Island, near Port Mansfield. This vessel, which wrecked in 1554 when part of a treasure flota, lies within the Padre Island National Seashore. The San Esteban was discovered in the early 1970s during a magnetometer survey of the area arranged by the Underwater Archeological Research Section of the state Antiquities Committee.

== See also ==
- National Register of Historic Places listings in Kenedy County, Texas
