= Violet, Texas =

Unincorporated community in Texas, US

Coordinates: 27°47′01″N 97°35′43″W

Violet is a small unincorporated community with a population around 40 in Nueces County, Texas, United States. It lies along State Highway 44, between the cities of Corpus Christi and Robstown.

== History ==
In the early 1900s, German immigrant farmers moved to the region where cats were raised, and began to grow crops. In December 1906, Erwin Cushman and Louis Petrus jointly acquired a 1030-acre plot in the area then known as Land Siding. Petrus soon bought out Cushman, and in early 1908, he appointed John W. Hoelscher to sell the land in exchange for a commission of 50 cents (now about $12) per acre. Hoelscher decided to promote the area specifically to German-American Catholic farmers. He advertised in several Texas German newspapers, and secured the endorsement of Reverend Peter Verdaguer, the apostolic vicar of Brownsville (the precursor to the Diocese of Corpus Christi).

By 1910, the population had increased to where a new school had to be built. Louis Petrus and Charles Hoelscher donated land for the school to Reverend Verdauger, and Charles Hoelscher donated money for the project. The school was opened in December 1910, with Geraldine Dunn as the first teacher. The school also served as a church until a church building could be built, and on December 26, 1910, the Reverend Ferdinand Joseph Goebbels presided over the first Mass there. In 1911, an acre of land was set aside for a cemetery, and in 1912, a rectory was built. The next year, the rectory was converted to a school, and the old school was then used exclusively for a church.

In 1913, the community was renamed from Land Siding to Violet, after the wife of storekeeper John Fister, and a post office was built, which remained in operation until 1947. In 1918, a new school was built to accommodate a growing number of children, and the next year, the church, named St. Anthony's, was renovated and expanded. In 1952, a new church was built, and the old church was moved to nearby Clarkwood and renamed Our Lady of Mount Carmel. In 1972, the old church was abandoned and the Violet Historical Society was founded to raise money to return the building to Violet. In 1975, it was placed approximately 200 feet east of the original site and restored by descendants of the original builders. In the late 1990s, the Texas Department of Transportation bought up the land surrounding Highway 44, reducing the town's population.
