= Hurricane Hanna (2020) =

Category 1 Atlantic hurricane

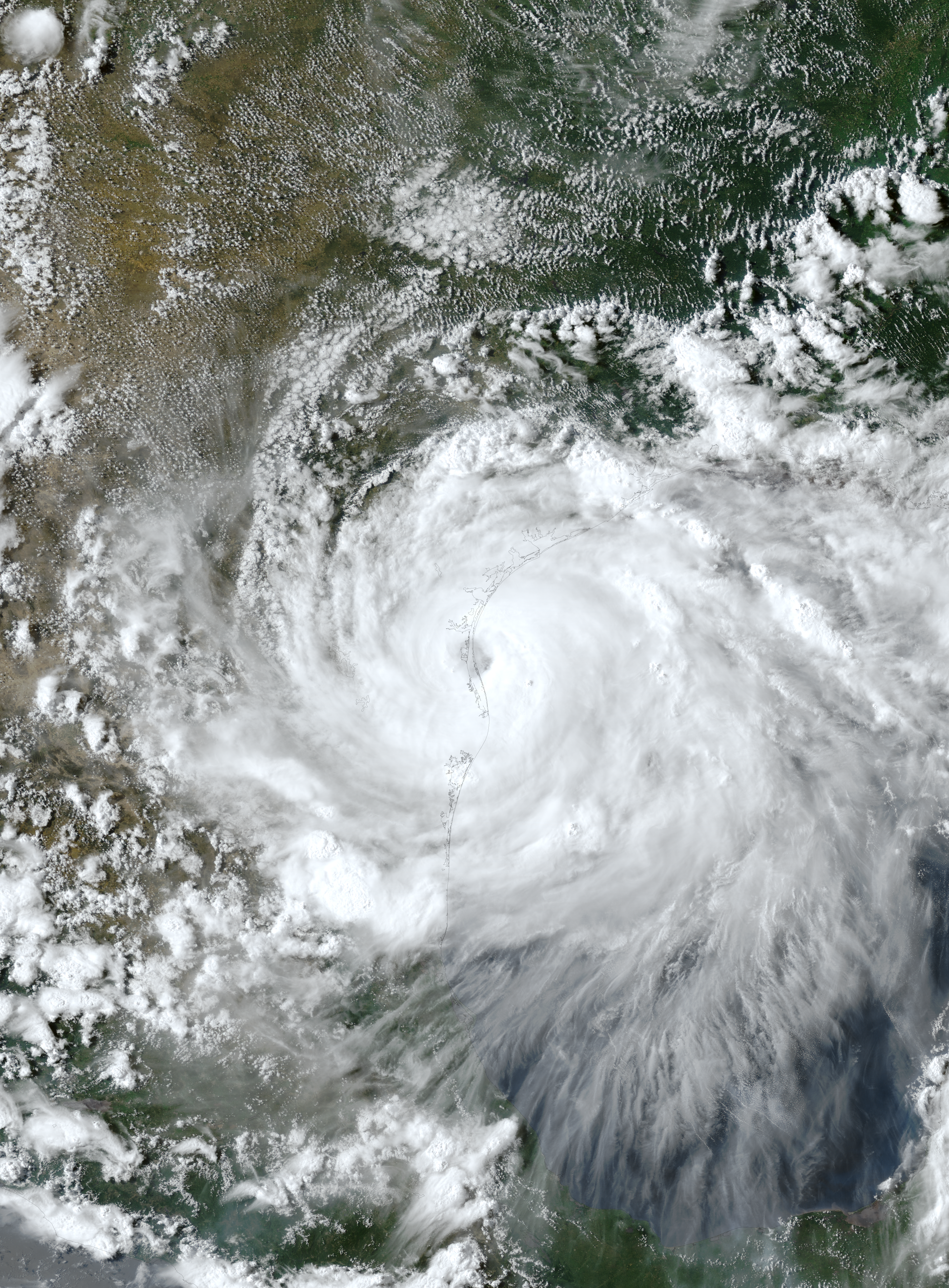
- Hanna at peak intensity making landfall in Texas on July 25

Meteorological history
- Formed: July 23, 2020
- Dissipated: July 26, 2020

Category 1 hurricane
- 1-minute sustained (SSHWS/NWS)
- Highest winds: 90 mph (150 km/h)
- Lowest pressure: 973 mbar (hPa); 28.73 inHg

Overall effects
- Fatalities: 9
- Damage: $1.2 billion (2020 USD)
- Areas affected: Cuba, Hispaniola, Gulf Coast of the United States (mainly Texas), Mexico
- Part of the 2020 Atlantic hurricane season

Hurricane Hanna was the first of a record-tying six Atlantic hurricanes to make landfall in the United States in a single season. The eighth named storm and first of fourteen hurricanes of the extremely active 2020 Atlantic hurricane season, Hanna developed from a tropical wave originating near Hispaniola. This disturbance dropped heavy rain upon parts of Hispaniola, Cuba, and Florida. The wave gradually became more organized and developed into a tropical depression in the central portion of the Gulf of Mexico. The depression strengthened into a tropical storm on July 24, setting a new record for the earliest eighth-named storm in the basin, getting its name 10 calendar days before the previous record holder, Tropical Storm Harvey of 2005. Hanna steadily intensified as it drifted toward Southern Texas, becoming the season's first hurricane early on July 25. It then began to quickly strengthen just before making landfall at 22:00 UTC later that day as a high-end Category 1 hurricane, with maximum sustained winds of 90 mph (140 km/h) and a minimum central pressure of 973 mbar (hPa; 28.73 inHg). Hanna weakened quickly as it moved inland and turned west-southwest, eventually dissipating over Mexico on July 26.

In Florida, the precursor to Hanna killed one person due to rip currents. Hanna's outer bands also caused rounds of thunderstorms across parts of the Northern Gulf Coast. Along the way, it dumped up to 18 inches (460 mm) of rain in isolated areas in Southern Texas and Mexico. The storm resulted in 50,000+ people losing power. Hurricane Hanna caused minor damage to well-built structures, serious damage to smaller structures, and downed powerlines. In Texas, where the storm made landfall, extensive property damage was reported in the Rio Grande Valley especially in Port Mansfield. The brunt of the damage was located south of Corpus Christi due to the eye taking a more southward path than originally forecast. Corpus Christi experienced storm surge flooding and tropical storm-force winds, while areas south of the city experienced hurricane-force sustained winds, and in Mexico, severe flooding caused by Hanna killed four people. Overall, Hurricane Hanna was estimated to have caused a total of at least $1.2 billion in damage.

== Meteorological history ==
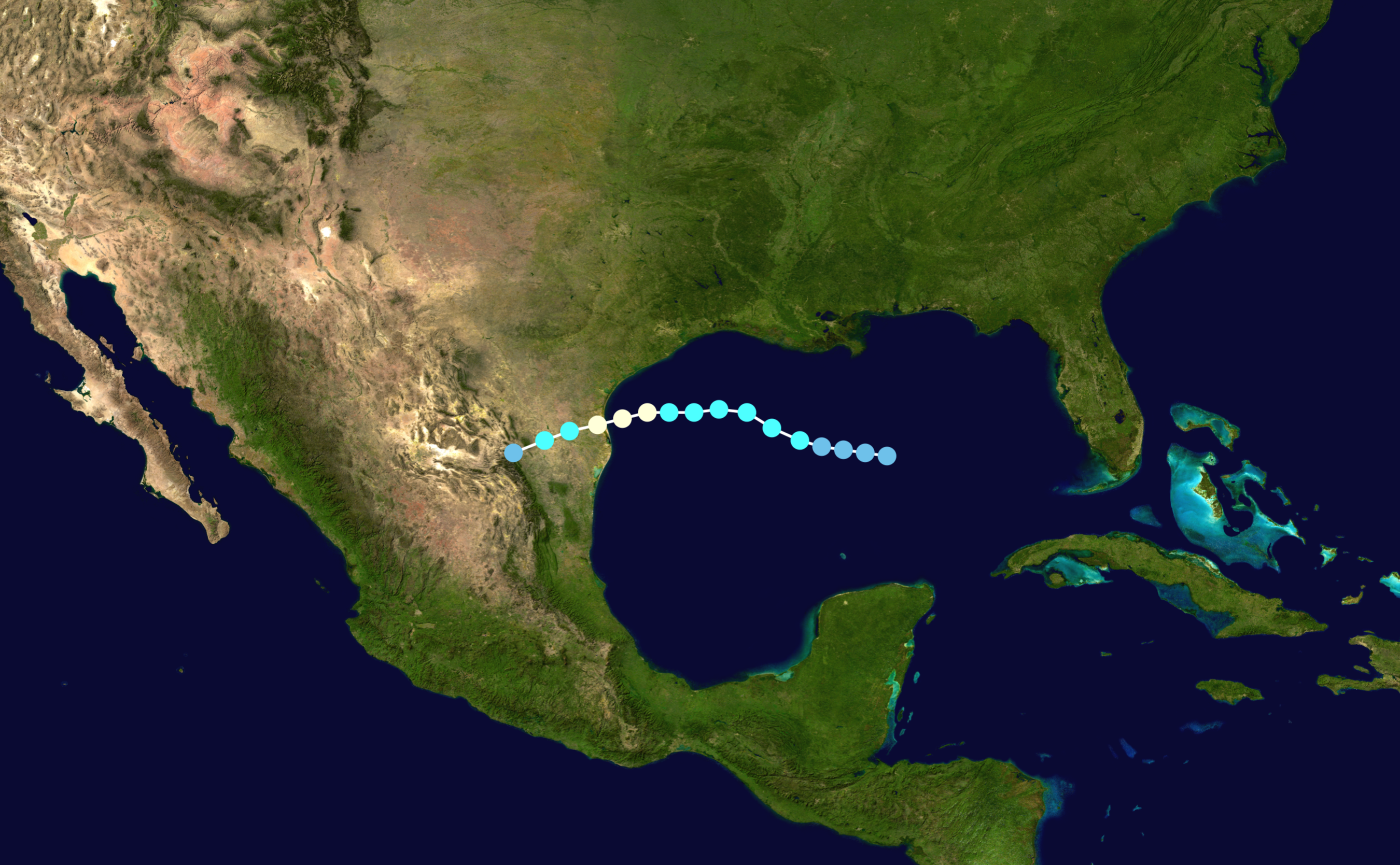
Map plotting the storm's track and intensity, according to the Saffir–Simpson scale Map key Saffir–Simpson scale Tropical depression (≤38 mph, ≤62 km/h) Tropical storm (39–73 mph, 63–118 km/h) Category 1 (74–95 mph, 119–153 km/h) Category 2 (96–110 mph, 154–177 km/h) Category 3 (111–129 mph, 178–208 km/h) Category 4 (130–156 mph, 209–251 km/h) Category 5 (≥157 mph, ≥252 km/h) Unknown Storm type Tropical cyclone Subtropical cyclone Extratropical cyclone, remnant low, tropical disturbance, or monsoon depression

A tropical wave moved off the west coast of Africa late on July 11. The convection that accompanied the wave was quickly choked off by dry mid-level air. The system continued westward within these same conditions without developing for several days. As it passed north of the Virgin Islands and Puerto Rico on July 18, minimal, but consistent shallow convection began to build on the northern side of the wave and the NHC began to monitor it for possible development early the next morning. The wave slowed and deep convection increased across its axis as it moved through Greater Antilles and the Southern Bahamas, although unfavorable upper-level winds kept it from organizing. However, after entering the southeastern Gulf of Mexico during the afternoon of July 21, the upper-level winds relaxed over the wave, which then started to gradually become better organized and more defined, with a broad area of low pressure forming on July 22. During the morning hours of July 23, hurricane reconnaissance aircraft flew into the system, and was able to find that a closed circulation had developed and it was determined had developed into Tropical Depression Eight at 00:00 UTC that day while located about 210 nmi south-southeast of the Mouth of the Mississippi River. Dry air kept the depression from strengthening for 24 hours, but at 00:00 UTC on July 24, the depression strengthened into Tropical Storm Hanna. This was confirmed by banding features becoming evident within the newly formed system and hurricane reconnaissance aircraft data indicating tropical storm-force winds inside the nascent storm at around 03:00 UTC that day. Hanna was the earliest eighth-named storm on record, surpassing Tropical Storm Harvey of 2005 by well over a week.

Despite being a large and sprawling storm surrounded by dry air, Hanna continued to steadily intensify as it approached Texas, defying forecasts by strengthening faster than anticipated. This also caused Hanna to dive farther to the south than originally predicted. Microwave imagery around 19:44 UTC on July 24 showed a developing mid-level eye within a significantly improved inner core of convection. These features continue to organize and become better defined as the system moved west-southwestward and at 12:00 UTC on July 25, Hanna strengthened into hurricane. Hanna strengthened further despite increasing land interaction, developing an eye of 30–35 nmi on radar and satellite imagery. Reaching a peak intensity of 90 mph (140 km/h) and a pressure of 973 mbar at 18:00 UTC, the storm made landfall at Padre Island, Texas, at 22:00 UTC. Hanna then moved over the Laguna Madre and made a second landfall in Kenedy County, Texas, 10 nmi north of Port Mansfield, Texas, at 23:15 UTC with the same wind speeds, although its pressure had risen by a millibar. Once inland, Hanna rapidly weakened, becoming a tropical storm by 06:00 UTC on July 26. Around 12:00 UTC that same day, the weakening Hanna moved into Northeastern Mexico and dropped to tropical depression status at 18:00 UTC when it was located near Monterrey, Mexico, at which time the responsibility of advisories was passed to the Weather Prediction Center. The last advisory by the WPC was later issued that day and Hanna dissipated over the mountainous terrain by 00:00 UTC on July 27.

== Preparations ==
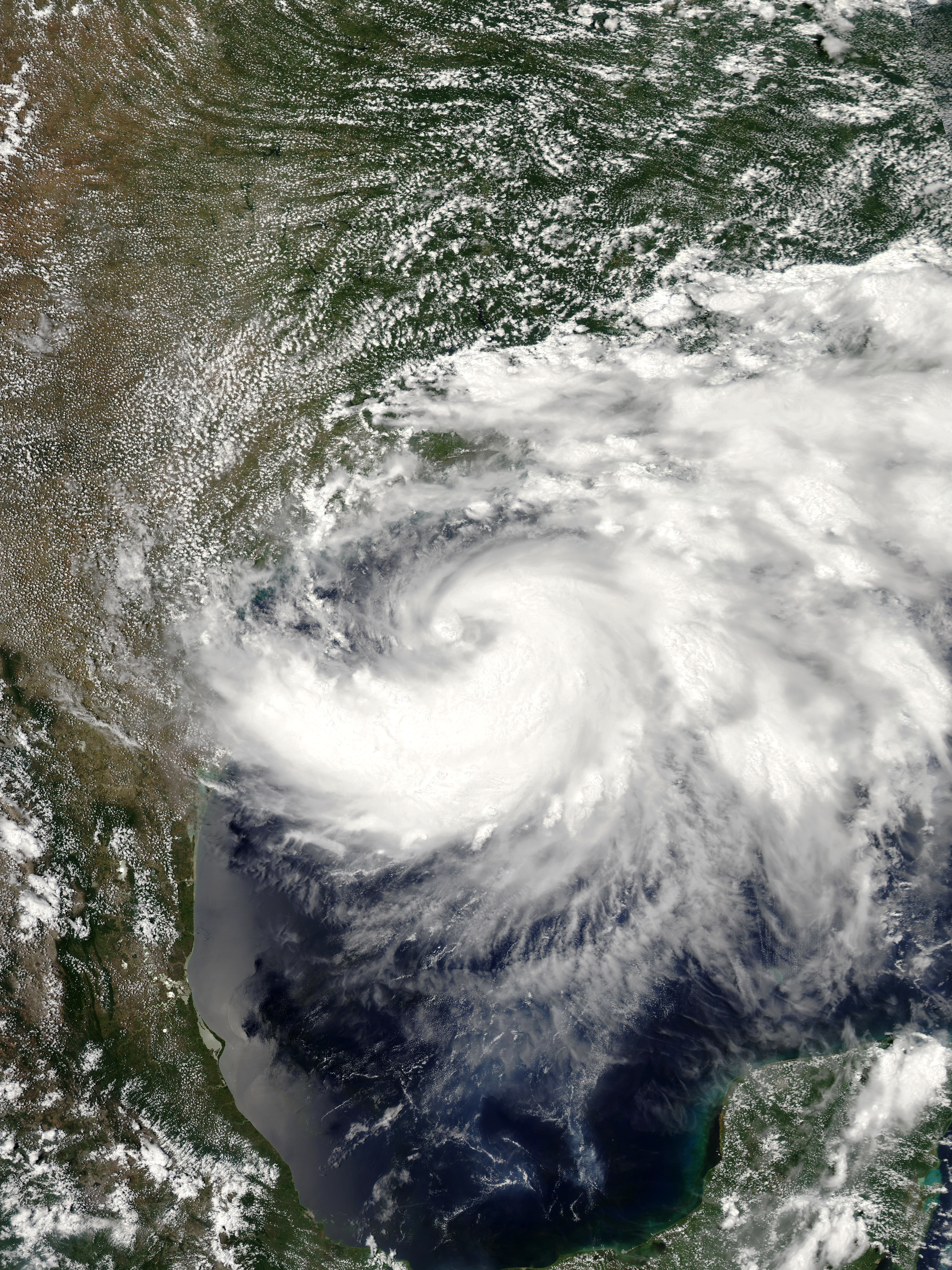
Tropical Storm Hanna intensifying over the Gulf of Mexico on July 24

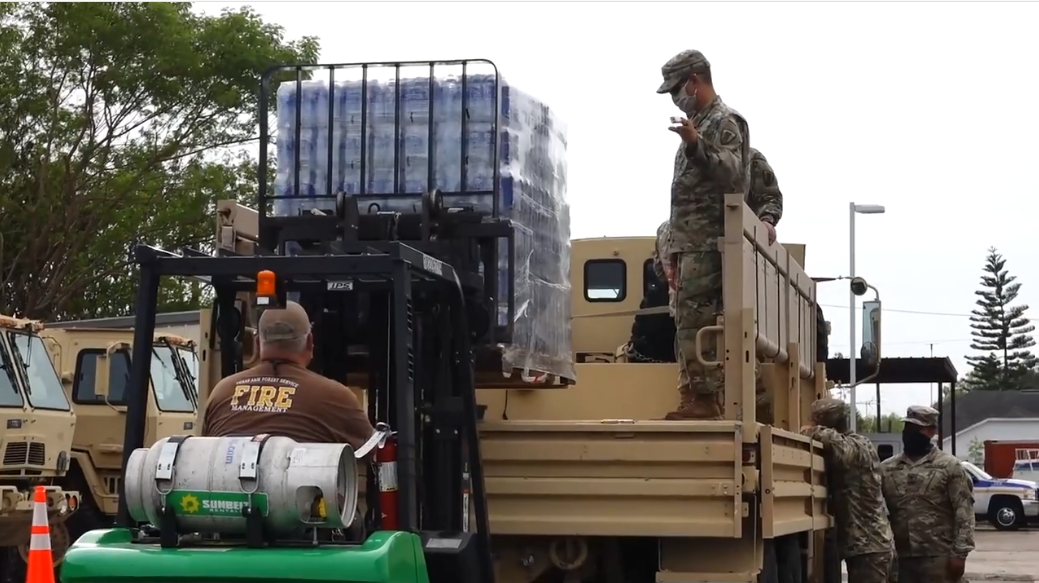
The Texas National Guard unloading supplies before Hurricane Hanna.

The National Weather Service first issued a tropical storm watch for the coast of Texas between Port Mansfield and High Island at 03:00 UTC on July 23 when Tropical Depression Eight—the precursor to Hurricane Hanna—was first designated. The Texas Division of Emergency Management (TDEM) organized personnel and assets from state agencies to assist local preparations for the approaching storm. These included search-and-rescue teams from Texas A&M Task Force 1 and the Texas Department of Public Safety. The Department of Public Safety also provided aircraft, mainly helicopters, for similar purposes. Search and rescue and cleanup crews were also readied for Hanna's aftermath. The United States Coast Guard urged mariners to clear the waters off the Texas coast and bring large vessels to safety at inland marinas. While Hanna was not expected to pose a significant threat to the Houston area, local emergency management placed high-water rescue trucks and crews on standby. The active tropical storm watch was superseded by a tropical storm warning between Port Mansfield and San Luis Pass at 21:00 UTC on July 23. The next day, a hurricane warning was issued for the Texas coast between Baffin Bay and Mesquite Bay; the warning was later expanded southward to Port Mansfield. Additionally, a tornado watch was issued for a portion of Southeast Texas.

The Padre Island National Seashore and beaches along the Nueces Bay and the Gulf of Mexico around Corpus Christi were closed in anticipation of storm-enhanced tides. Both Texas A&M University–Corpus Christi and Del Mar College limited operations amid the storm's passage. Hanna threatened Texas concurrent with an increase in viral cases associated with the COVID-19 pandemic. At least one drive-through testing site for COVID-19 was closed in Corpus Christi in preparation for Hanna while the pandemic limited the number of emergency management personnel in the Rio Grande Valley. Both the Corpus Christi Regional Transportation Authority and the Lower Rio Grande Valley Development Council cancelled their bus services for two days. The Port of Corpus Christi closed to all ship traffic on July 24 and Corpus Christi International Airport cancelled most flights on July 25.

A local state of disaster lasting seven days was declared by County Judge Richard F. Cortez in Hidalgo County on July 25 due to the threat of "catastrophic flooding." A state of disaster was also declared in Cameron County and San Patricio County. Texas Governor Greg Abbott issued a disaster declaration for 32 counties across South Texas later that day shortly before Hanna struck the state. Abbott also appealed for a federal disaster declaration and public assistance from the Federal Emergency Management Agency (FEMA). Several counties and municipalities distributed sandbags ahead of Hanna's arrival. Willacy County officials recommended the evacuation of people from Port Mansfield. A voluntary evacuation order for Baffin Bay, Loyola Beach, Ricardo, and Riviera was issued by Kleberg County Judge Rudy Madrid, while a voluntary evacuation was recommended by San Patricio County Judge David R. Krebs for vulnerable areas. Evacuation shelters were opened across the Rio Grande Valley. A FEMA Dome was opened as a shelter in Kingsville at H.M. King High School and the Freeman Coliseum in San Antonio was repurposed as a reception center for evacuees with assistance from the American Red Cross. The Texas National Guard and state agencies sent 17 teams to test evacuees for COVID-19. In Guadalupe, Nuevo León, a Mexican league soccer match was postponed as a precautionary measure.

== Impact ==
=== Texas ===
Hurricane Hanna making its second landfall in Texas as viewed from weather radar

In Texas, where the storm made landfall, around 194,000 residents in the Rio Grande Valley and surrounding areas lost power due to Hanna. Hanna also dumped several inches of rain causing widespread flash flooding in the same region, while it also caused downed trees and ripped roofs from homes. Wind gusts reached up to 110 mph (180 km/h) and storm surge reached as high as 6.24 ft (1.90 m) at landfall. The Bob Hall Pier in Corpus Christi was extensively damaged and eventually collapsed partially due to high winds and storm surge. The Art Museum of South Texas’ first floor and outdoor exhibits at the Texas State Aquarium were inundated by storm surge from Corpus Christi Bay. Areas affected by Hanna were already struggling due to a surge of COVID-19 cases in the region. Several marinas and boats on the coastline were severely damaged. Three individuals had to be rescued from a sinking sailboat on a marina off the coast. Many streets and highways later became inaccessible for much of July 25 and 26.

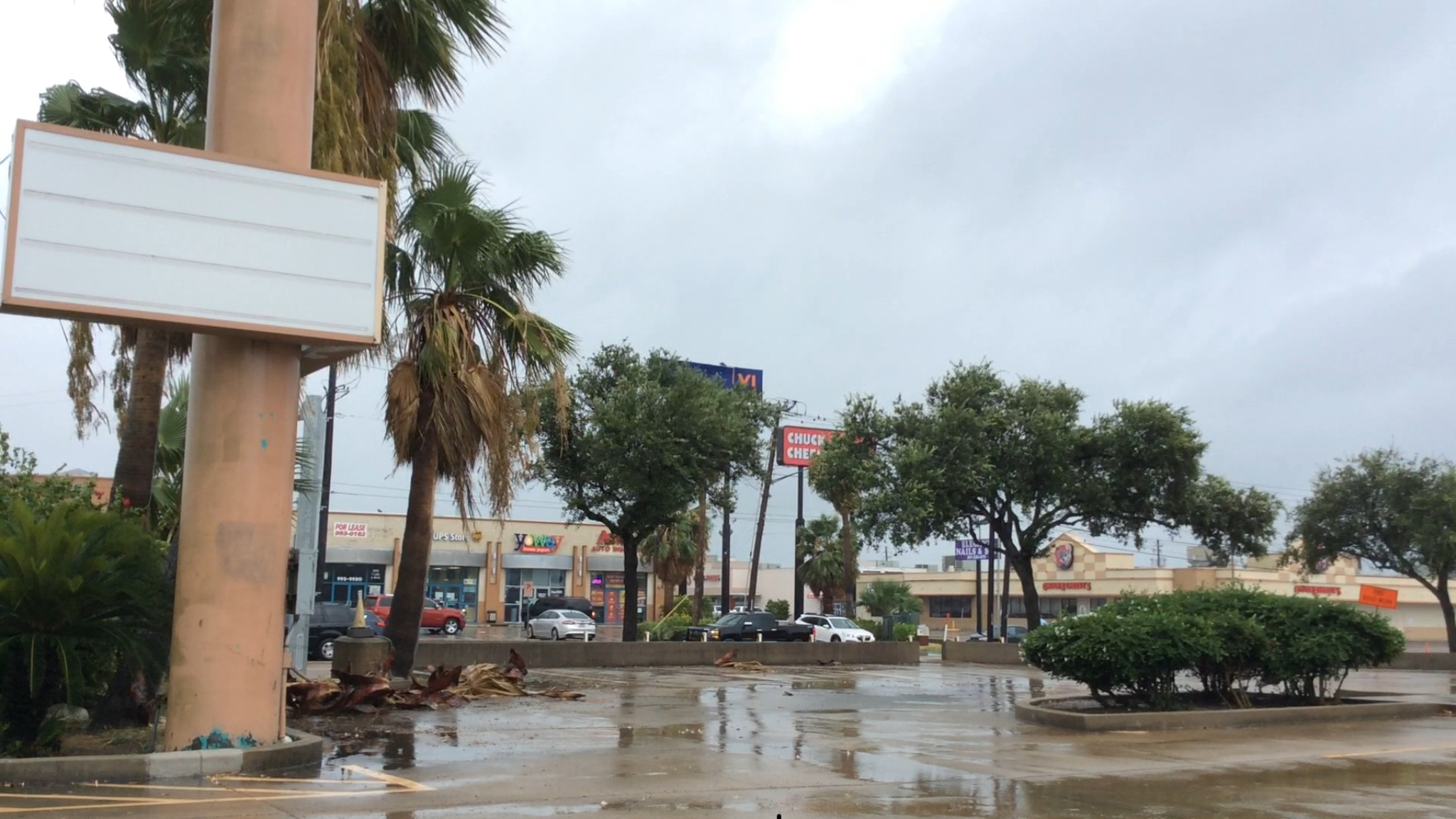
Damage from Hurricane Hanna in Corpus Christi, Texas during the storm.

Hanna caused significant crop damage, totaling to $176.6 million (2020 USD). In Port Mansfield, 40% of homes received severe structural damage. Near Laguna Madre, a few boat garages were damaged by high winds. The cities of Mission, McAllen, and Weslaco were also placed under flash flood emergencies due to Hanna's rainbands. Roads in Mission became impassible due to flooding. In Roma, a tin roof was blown off a gas station. In McAllen, a fast food restaurant sign was toppled, and a canal overflowed, flooding numerous roads. In Los Barreras, the roof of a carport was blown away.

As Hanna moved further inland and weakened on July 26, the storm unleashed copious amounts of rainfall in South Texas, with rainfall totals reaching up to 15 in (380 mm). Additionally, Hanna's outer bands caused widespread tornado warnings across South Texas and five EF0 tornadoes were confirmed to have touched down. One of these tornadoes briefly touched down and damaged two homes and a hangar in Brownsville/South Padre Island International Airport, and moved a Boeing 737 aircraft. Even a day following landfall much of the areas near the coast in Corpus Christi remained submerged from storm surge and flash flooding. After sheltering for the storm, thousands of American Electric Power crews worked for days to restore power, but were delayed to some areas due to high water, especially in the Rio Grande Valley. As of 14 September 2020, economic losses were estimated at or above US$775 million.

=== Mexico ===
On July 26, streets in Monterrey were flooded by Hanna after it had been downgraded to a tropical storm. Other parts of the states of Nuevo León, Coahuila, and Tamaulipas were similarly affected. Electrical power was cut in large sections of Monterrey and neighboring areas, while the road linking Monterrey to Reynosa, Tamaulipas, was closed due to flooding. In the city of Matamoros, across the border from Brownsville, Texas, heavy rain and winds damaged tents in a refugee camp housing an estimated 1,300 asylum seekers. Reynosa was one of the most affected cities in Mexico, where 45 neighborhoods were damaged, two people were killed, and 200 people were displaced due to Hanna's impact. One of the deaths was caused by drowning in Hanna's floodwaters after the victim suffered a seizure. A maternity hospital was flooded on July 26.

An 11-year-old child was reported missing after falling into an overflowing stream in Monterrey, where extensive flooding and fallen trees were reported. A 35-year-old woman and her daughter were killed in Ramos Arizpe, Coahuila. Total economic losses in Mexico were at least US$100 million.

=== Elsewhere ===
The precursor disturbance to Hanna dropped heavy rain to parts of Hispaniola, the Florida Keys and Cuba. In Pensacola, Florida, a 33-year-old police deputy was drowned by rip currents while trying to save his 10-year-old son in Sandestin Beach. In portions of Louisiana, Mississippi, Alabama, and the Florida Panhandle, the outer bands of Hanna brought heavy rainfall, even threatening street flooding in New Orleans.

== Aftermath ==
=== Texas ===
Due to the extensive damage to property in the southern part of the state, Governor Greg Abbott issued a declaration of disaster for 32 counties affected by the storm. The Federal Emergency Management Agency (FEMA) and President Donald Trump granted a Federal Emergency Declaration request for Public Assistance. This allowed the Federal government to provide emergency protective measures, such as Federal assistance and reimbursement for mass care including evacuation and shelter support at 75 percent federal funding. Three days after Hanna made landfall, Governor Greg Abbott visited Corpus Christi and praised the preparations for Hanna stating that no deaths occurred in Texas in association with the storm.

It was initially reported that federal funds would be provided to tear down Bob Hall Pier due to the extensive damage it received during Hanna. However, as of January 2021 the county has not been able to receive FEMA funding for the pier.

=== Mexico ===
A video showing the collapse of part of the Mexican-United States border wall was widely shared on social media, with the cause attributed to Hanna's high winds; the United States Army Corps of Engineers later clarified that the collapse had occurred over a month earlier, in the state of New Mexico, and was completely unrelated to Hanna. Asylum seekers at a camp in Matamoros were angered due to the lack of warning with Hanna. A worker for the Global Response Management (GRM) and Resource Centre Matamoros (RCM) said that nothing was damaged but a few tents and that they wanted to provide basic human rights for residents at asylum seeker camps.

== See also ==
- Tropical cyclones in 2020
- Other storms of the same name
- List of Category 1 Atlantic hurricanes
- Hurricane Bret (1999) – A Category 4 hurricane that impacted similar areas
- Hurricane Claudette (2003) – A Category 1 hurricane that also impacted South Texas
- Hurricane Erika (2003) – A Category 1 hurricane that took a similar path
- Hurricane Dolly (2008) – A Category 2 hurricane that made landfall in a similar location at a similar strength
