= List of Texas hurricanes (1980–present) =

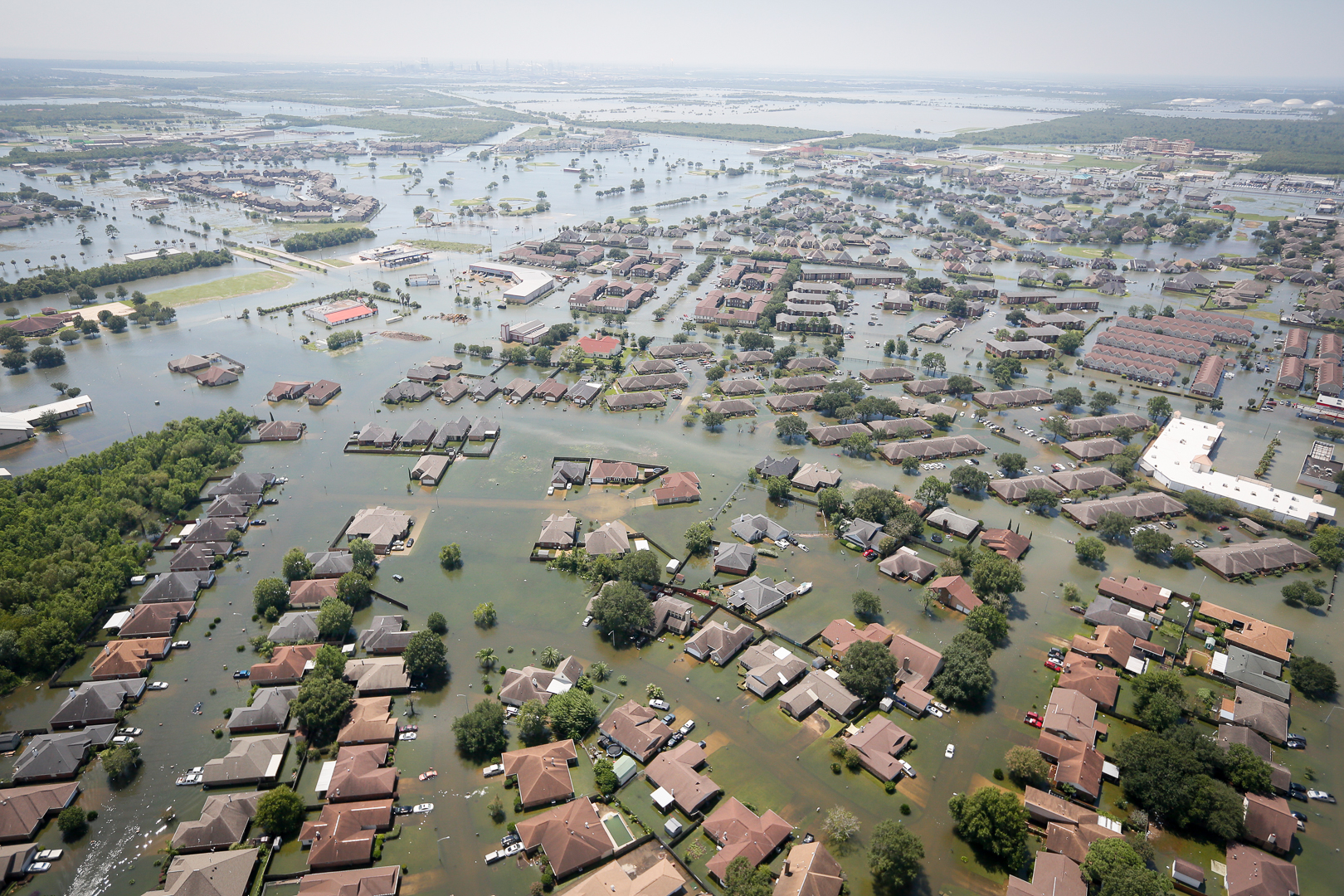
Flooding in Port Arthur from Hurricane Harvey

From 1980 to the present, 82 tropical or subtropical cyclones affected the U.S. state of Texas. According to David Roth of the Weather Prediction Center, a tropical cyclone makes landfall along the coastline about three times every four years. On any 50 mi (80 km) segment of the coastline, a hurricane makes landfall about once every six years.

The most active month is September, with 21 total storms, while no recorded storms have affected Texas during the months of December through May. The most intense storm in terms of barometric pressure and maximum sustained winds is Hurricane Harvey in 2017, which also caused the most fatalities and damages, with $125 billion in Texas. (Note: All damage totals are in the value of the USD during the storm's year of existence.) The first storm to impact the state during the period is Hurricane Allen in August 1980, with the most recent being Hurricane Beryl in July 2024.

During the 1980s, multiple tropical cyclones affected the state, of which six made landfall as hurricanes; two made landfall in the state as major hurricanes. (Note: A major hurricane is a storm that ranks as Category 3 or higher on the Saffir–Simpson hurricane scale.) Hurricane Alicia is the most destructive hurricane of the decade, severely impacting the Greater Houston area. The names of all the major hurricanes that impacted Texas during the 1980s were later retired by the World Meteorological Organization. In contrast to the 1980s, during the 1990s only one hurricane, Hurricane Bret, made landfall on the Texas coast. In the next decade five hurricanes would make landfall on Texas. Hurricane Ike, the second costliest hurricane to impact Texas, made landfall during the decade. Other notable systems include Tropical Storm Allison and Hurricane Rita.

== 1980–1984 ==
Hurricane Allen (1980) near landfall

- August 10, 1980 – Hurricane Allen makes landfall near Brownsville as a Category 3 hurricane. A wind gust of 140 mph (230 km/h) is reported in Port Mansfield. Heavy rainfall is reported across South Texas, with a peak of 20.2 in (510 mm) in Kingsville. Nearly all structures on South Padre Island are destroyed. At least 12 tornadoes are also reported as a result of Allen. One damages hangars and aircraft at Robert Mueller Municipal Airport, causing $250 million in damages. Two deaths are directly attributed to Allen, both of which are drownings in the Corpus Christi area, with five others indirectly killed. An estimated $600 million in damages are attributed to Allen.
- September 5, 1980 – Tropical Storm Danielle makes landfall near Galveston Bay as a weak tropical storm. As it moves inland, it causes severe and widespread flooding across Texas. Areas are inundated by the rain, peaking at 18.29 in (465 mm) in Nederland. One person is killed due to rains associated with Danielle.
- Mid-November 1980 – Hurricane Jeanne over the Western Gulf of Mexico causes tides to rise up to 4 ft (1.2 m) above average along the Texas coast. Coastal flooding also occurs, with the worst being near Galveston. Minimal damage is reported.
- Late-August 1981 – Tropical Depression Eight moves ashore northeast Mexico on August 29 and into the United States on August 30. As an ill-defined surface low, a large thunderstorm complex forms near its center that day, which unleashes very heavy rainfall in a 50 mi (80 km) wide band covering a 200 mi (320 km) path from Seguin to north of Houston. The highest rainfall amount reported is from Cheapside, where 18 in (460 mm) falls in a 24‑hour period ending on the morning of August 31. Five die in the town of Shiner due to the heavy rains. Heavy rain in downtown Hallettsville causes floods and torrential rain, reaching a peak of 5 ft (1.5 m). Significant flooding also occurs along the Lavaca, Guadalupe, and Colorado rivers in Texas. Damages from the floods amount to nearly $21 million.
- October 13, 1981 – Hurricane Norma makes landfall on the Pacific coast of Mexico, but its remnants produce 21 in (530 mm) of rain near Dallas-Fort Worth, killing five. Multiple tornadoes touch down in six counties in the region, injuring three. Hurricane Norma causes $50 million in damages and kills three people in Texas.
- September 11, 1982 – Tropical Storm Chris makes landfall near Sabine Pass. Before landfall the storm causes tides of 5 to 6 ft (1.5–1.8 m) in height. Rainfall from Chris peaks at 0.96 in (24 mm) in Evadale.

Hurricane Alicia (1983) at landfall

- August 18, 1983 – Hurricane Alicia makes landfall near Galveston as a Category 3 hurricane. Alicia causes $2.6 billion in damage and 13 fatalities, along with an estimated 5,805 residential structures either heavily damaged or destroyed. In advance of Alicia, offshore drilling platforms are evacuated. At one point during the storm, the entire city of Galveston loses power, with 250,000 electricity customers in Houston losing power as well. At the time, Hurricane Alicia is the costliest hurricane to impact Texas, not adjusting for inflation. High rainfall totals are reported across Southeast Texas, with a peak of 9.5 in (240 mm) of rain in Liberty. The peak wind gust in Galveston is 102 mph (164 km/h). An estimated storm surge of up to 12 ft (3.7 m) is estimated in Galveston Bay. Alicia also causes 23 tornadoes, concentrated around the Galveston and Tyler areas.
- August 28, 1983 – Hurricane Barry, a Category 1, makes landfall just south of Brownsville and forces the evacuation of 4,000 people, but causes minor damage.
- Mid-October 1983 – The remnants of Hurricane Tico from the Eastern Pacific cause rainfall over much of Texas, most of which is in northern Texas, where rainfall peaks at 9.59 in (0.244 m) in Quanah. Numerous road closures take place due to the floods caused by the remnants of Tico. In Val Verde County, 100 people are evacuated due to the heavy rain. Tico's remnants kill one person and cause $93 million in damages.
- Mid-September 1984 – The remnants of Tropical Storm Edouard cause severe flooding in South Texas, where some isolated locations receive totals in excess of 20 in (510 mm).

== 1985–1989 ==
- October 11, 1985 – The remnants of Hurricane Waldo produce rainfall over most of West Texas, with multiple rain totals of at least 5 in (130 mm).
- Late-October 1985 – Hurricane Juan dumps up to 10 in (250 mm) of rain in extreme southeastern Texas, peaking at 12.84 in (326 mm) in Alto, killing one coastal resident. The rains cause widespread floods that lead to road closures, and gusty winds cause some power outages. Coastal flooding is also reported as a result of high tides caused by Juan.
- June 26, 1986 – Hurricane Bonnie makes landfall near High Island in Southeast Texas as a Category 1 hurricane, killing four people in Texas and producing heavy rainfall that causes street flooding. Rainfall peaks at 13 in (330 mm), with many areas picking up at least 10 in (250 mm). Bonnie also spawns four tornadoes in Texas.
- August 6, 1986 – A tropical depression produces rain over South Texas with a maximum total of 4.5 in (110 mm) near Refugio.
- September 23, 1986 – The remnants of Hurricane Newton produce 1 in (25 mm) rainfall totals over the Texas Panhandle with an area of 3 in (76 mm) near the border between New Mexico and Texas, peaking at 3.97 in (101 mm) in Wharton.
- Early-October 1986 – The remnants of Hurricane Paine produce widespread rainfall over western and northern Texas, most of which receives at least an inch of rain, with 10.39 in (264 mm) in Wellington.
- October 22, 1986 – The remnants of Hurricane Roslyn produce rainfall over much of southern and eastern Texas, with the heaviest totals along the middle Texas coast, where rainfall totals exceeds 10 in (250 mm). Roslyn causes low-water crossings and streams to flood.

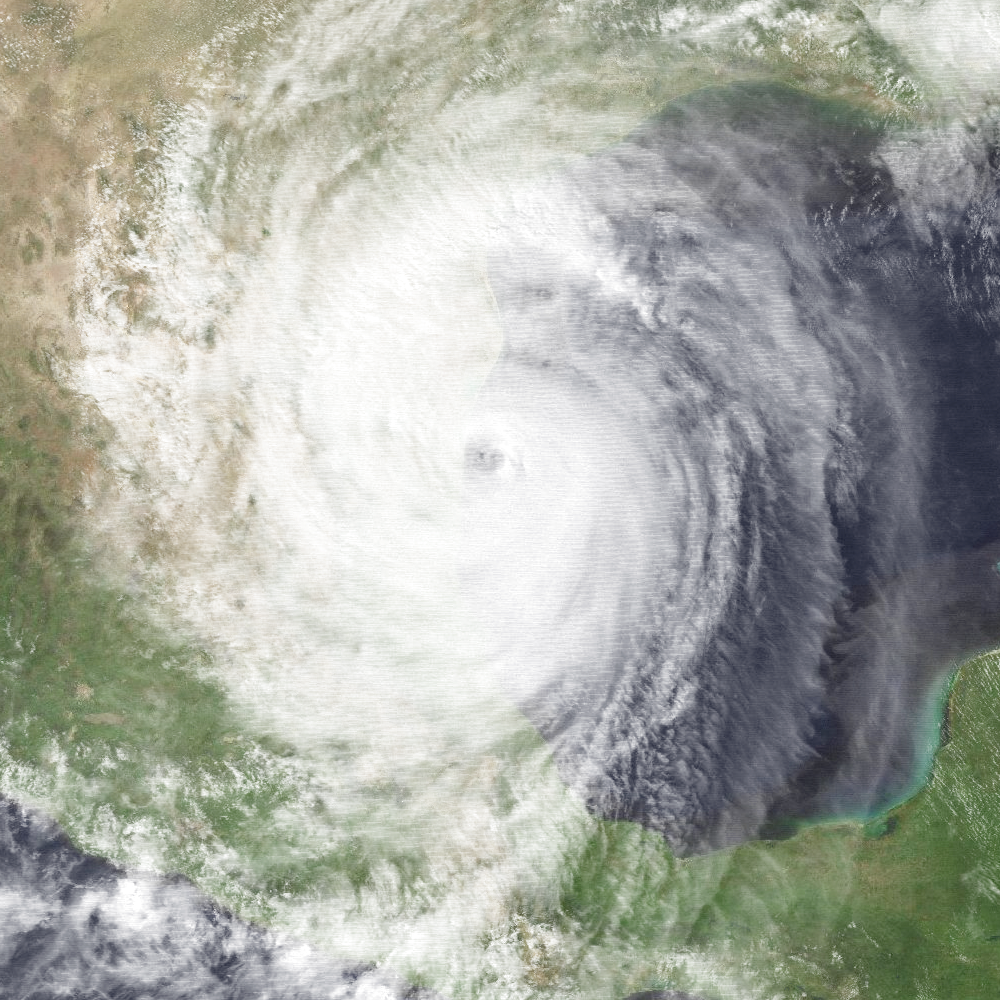
Hurricane Gilbert at landfall in northern Mexico

- August 10, 1987 – An unnamed storm makes landfall near High Island, Texas, producing over 1 in (25 mm) of rain to eastern portions of the state, peaking at 4.25 in (108 mm) in Umbarger.
- August 12, 1988 – Tropical Storm Beryl produces heavy rainfall over East Texas. Some areas receive 11.8 in (300 mm) of rain, causing localized flash flooding.
- September 2, 1988 – Tropical Depression Ten produces heavy rain over Southeast Texas, peaking at 8.16 in (207 mm) in Galveston.
- September 17, 1988 – Hurricane Gilbert makes landfall in northern Mexico with winds of 125 mph (201 km/h) and causes tides to rise up to 5 ft (1.5 m) above normal. As a result, beach erosion is reported on Padre Island. Rainfall peaks at 7.45 in (189 mm) in Anson. Minor wind damage is reported from Gilbert. Twenty-nine tornadoes are recorded across Texas, with the worst damage in San Antonio. Gilbert causes three deaths in Texas, all resulting from tornadoes in San Antonio. Damages from Gilbert total to $50 million.
- Late-June 1989 – Tropical Storm Allison makes landfall near Freeport, causing three deaths in the state. Tropical Storm Allison produces torrential rainfall across the state, with amounts of more than 10 in (250 mm) over much of the upper Texas coast, peaking at 20.28 in (515 mm) in Orange. Storm surge from the storm measures 7 ft (2.1 m) in Trinity Bay. As a result, beach erosion is reported on Padre Island. Allison causes an estimated $400 million in Texas alone.
- August 1, 1989 – Hurricane Chantal makes landfall as a minimal hurricane at High Island, Texas, causing two deaths from flash flooding.
- Early-October 1989 – Hurricane Raymond from the East Pacific causes rainfall in northern Texas, peaking at 2.80 in (71 mm) in Yorktown.
- October 16, 1989 – Hurricane Jerry affects the Galveston area as a minimal hurricane. The storm kills three people when a car is blown off The Galveston seawall. Jerry causes $70 million in damage and kills three.

== 1990–1994 ==
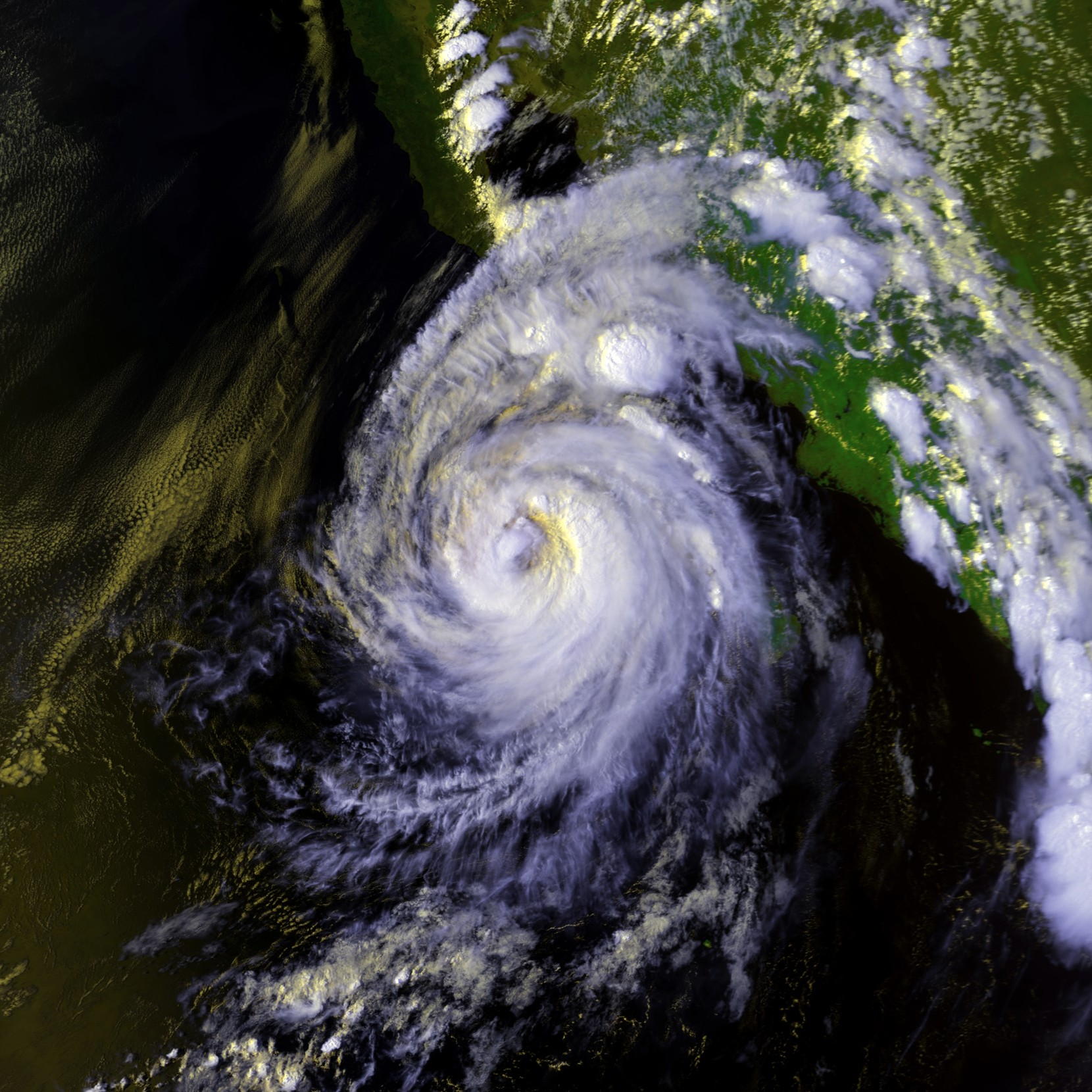
Hurricane Lester (1992) off Baja California

- October 3, 1990 – Tropical Storm Rachel's remnants affect portions of West Texas. Roads in Big Bend National Park are closed due to high water levels. Rainfall peaks at 1.5 in (38 mm) in Lubbock, causing minor street flooding, which leads to several car accidents.
- July 6, 1991 – Tropical Depression Two causes isolated rainfall over Texas, with a maximum total of 3 in (76 mm) reported within the vicinity of Anahuac.
- August 24, 1992 – The remnants of Hurricane Lester, which originated from the East Pacific, cause rainfall in North Texas, amounting up to 3 in (76 mm) in locations and peaking at 3.54 in (90 mm) in Chisos Basin.
- June 20, 1993 – Tropical Storm Arlene makes landfall near Padre Island. Heavy beach erosion occurs as a result of the storm. Arlene causes $55 million in damage and its flooding rains kill one person.
- September 14, 1993 – Hurricane Lidia moves into Texas before being absorbed by a cold front near Austin. Lidia's remnants cause moderate rainfall across the state, peaking at 7.3 in (190 mm) in Denton. The combination of the front and the hurricane's remnants trigger tornadoes, and one causes more than $8 million in damages. Five people are injured in Arlington after a roof is torn off their hotel.
- Mid-October 1994 – The remnants of Hurricane Rosa cause severe flooding in Texas. In some locations the flood is considered a 100-year event, peaking at 29.40 in (747 mm) in Cypress. The floods kill 22 people and cause $700 million in damages.

== 1995–1999 ==
- July 31, 1995 – Tropical Storm Dean makes landfall near Freeport. Dean drops nearly 17 in (430 mm) of rain in Monroe City. The rainfall results in moderate localized damage.
- August 12, 1995 – Tropical Storm Gabrielle makes landfall just south of the Texas–Mexico border as a strong tropical storm, producing rainfall in southern Texas, peaking at 6.26 in (159 mm) in Weslaco. Slight storm surge associated with Gabrielle floods beaches along the southern Texas coast.
- September 16, 1995 – Hurricane Ismael's remnants move across the Texas Panhandle. Rainfall peaks at 6.57 in (167 mm) in Ransom Canyon, and flash flooding results in the area.
- August 23, 1996 – Hurricane Dolly makes landfall near Tampico, Mexico. The storm causes beneficial rainfall in southern Texas, peaking at 5.53 in (140 mm) in Corpus Christi, providing drought relief to the area.
- October 4, 1996 – Tropical Storm Josephine forms just offshore of the Texas coast, bringing heavy rain to the state. Rainfall peaks at 10.81 in (275 mm) in Brownsville. The storm, although remaining offshore, causes severe beach erosion across much of the coast. Several houses are lost and up to 65 ft (20 m) of shore-front property on Galveston Island is eroded.
- August 23, 1998 – Tropical Storm Charley makes landfall near Port Aransas. Severe inland flooding occurs in Val Verde Country and 13 people are killed. Del Rio records 17 in (430 mm) of rain in 24 hours from the storm, a city record and the most rainfall from a tropical cyclone in Texas since Tropical Storm Claudette in 1979.
- September 11, 1998 – Tropical Storm Frances makes landfall north of Corpus Christi on September 11 as a moderately strong tropical storm. Rainfall causes large amounts of flooding in southeast Texas and southwest Louisiana, peaking at 21.76 in (553 mm) in Goose Creek. As a result of the rains, many rivers and bayous overflow. Due to the storm, tides are 5 ft (1.5 m) above average. Frances causes an estimated total of $500 million in property damage.
- Mid-October 1998 – Moisture associated with the remnants of Hurricane Madeline results in flooding in Central Texas. The event breaks numerous rain records in the region, including the wettest month for San Antonio since records began in 1885. In addition, 15 rivers exceed the previously known peak flow. The floods kill 31 people. and cause $1.5 billion in damages.
- August 23, 1999 – Hurricane Bret makes landfall as a Category 3 hurricane on Padre Island, becoming the first major hurricane to hit Texas since Hurricane Alicia in 1983. As it approaches landfall, large swells cause minor beach erosion along the coast. Along with rainfall from Bret, beaches in Matagorda County are closed due to the high water level. Further inland, heavy rainfall occurs across South Texas, reaching 13.18 in (335 mm) in Sarita. At the height of the storm, power outages cut electricity to an estimated 64,000 customers. Due to the small size of Bret and its landfall in a relatively unpopulated region of the Texas coast, damages from Bret total just $15 million, but it causes four deaths, all of which are attributed to a semi-trailer truck jackknifing in Laredo.
- September 8, 1999 – Tropical Depression Seven's remnants produce light rainfall, peaking at 3.35 in (85 mm) in Harlingen.

== 2000–2004 ==
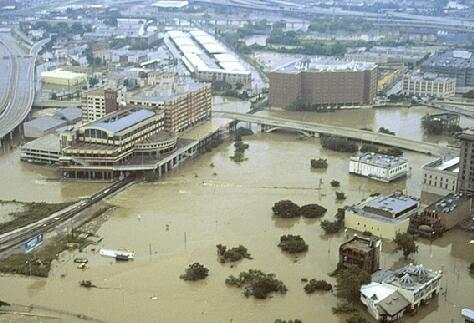
Flooding in Houston caused by Tropical Storm Allison (2001)

- September 9, 2000 – Tropical Depression Nine makes landfall near Sabine Pass, with maximum sustained winds of 30 mph (48 km/h). Minimal damage is reported.
- June 5, 2001 – Tropical Storm Allison makes landfall near Freeport. It stalls over eastern Texas for several days, dropping extreme amounts of rain which leads to catastrophic flooding. Allison causes flash flooding in the area, producing widespread street flooding and filling nearby bayous to severe levels. Rainfall peaks at 36.99 in (940 mm) at the Port of Houston. The Texas Medical Center is severely damaged, with losses of up to $2 billion. Patient evacuations and medical services are disrupted due to power outages caused by the storm. Allison causes an estimated $4.8 billion in damages, nearly all of it related to freshwater flooding in the Greater Houston region. Tropical Storm Allison causes 23 deaths in the state, and was the only non-hurricane strength storm to have its name retired until Tropical Storm Erika (did not affect the U.S.) in 2015.
- August 9, 2002 – Tropical Storm Bertha makes landfall as a tropical depression near Kingsville, causing isolated rainfall throughout the state.
- September 7, 2002 – Tropical Storm Fay makes landfall near Port O'Connor, where it causes heavy rainfall and $450,000 in damage. Rainfall peaks at 18.49 in (470 mm) in Fowlerton. Fay causes five tornadoes, one of which injures three people. Much of the impact takes place in Brazoria County, where over 2,300 homes are damaged.
- June 30, 2003 – Tropical Storm Bill causes minor beach erosion on the Bolivar Peninsula.
- July 15, 2003 – Hurricane Claudette makes landfall at Matagorda Island near Port O'Connor as a strong Category 1 storm, with maximum sustained winds of 90 mph (140 km/h). Claudette is responsible for one direct death. Inland towns in Texas sustain significant wind damage. Estimated damages total up to $180 million.
- August 16, 2003 – Hurricane Erika makes landfall in the Mexican state of Tamaulipas as a minor Category 1 hurricane, causing minor coastal damage and beach erosion in parts of southern Texas.
- August 31, 2003 – Tropical Storm Grace makes landfall near San Luis Pass with maximum sustained winds of 40 mph (64 km/h), causing heavy rainfall along the Texas coast and resulting in $113,000 in total damages.
- September 22, 2003 – Hurricane Marty from the East Pacific makes landfall in the Mexican state of Baja California Sur. Rainfall associated with the remnants of Marty affects western Texas.
- September 20, 2004 – As the remnants of Hurricane Javier move northeast through northwest Mexico, 1 in (25 mm) of rain is reported in western Texas.
- September 24, 2004 – Four days after Hurricane Javier affected the state, Hurricane Ivan, having regenerated into a tropical storm in the Gulf of Mexico, makes landfall near Cameron, Louisiana, as a tropical depression. Over 7 in (180 mm) of rain is dropped on eastern Texas.
- October 10, 2004 – Tropical Storm Matthew moves ashore in southern Louisiana, producing locally heavy rainfall in eastern Texas, peaking at 6.10 in (155 mm) in Matagorda, but little damage.

== 2005–2009 ==
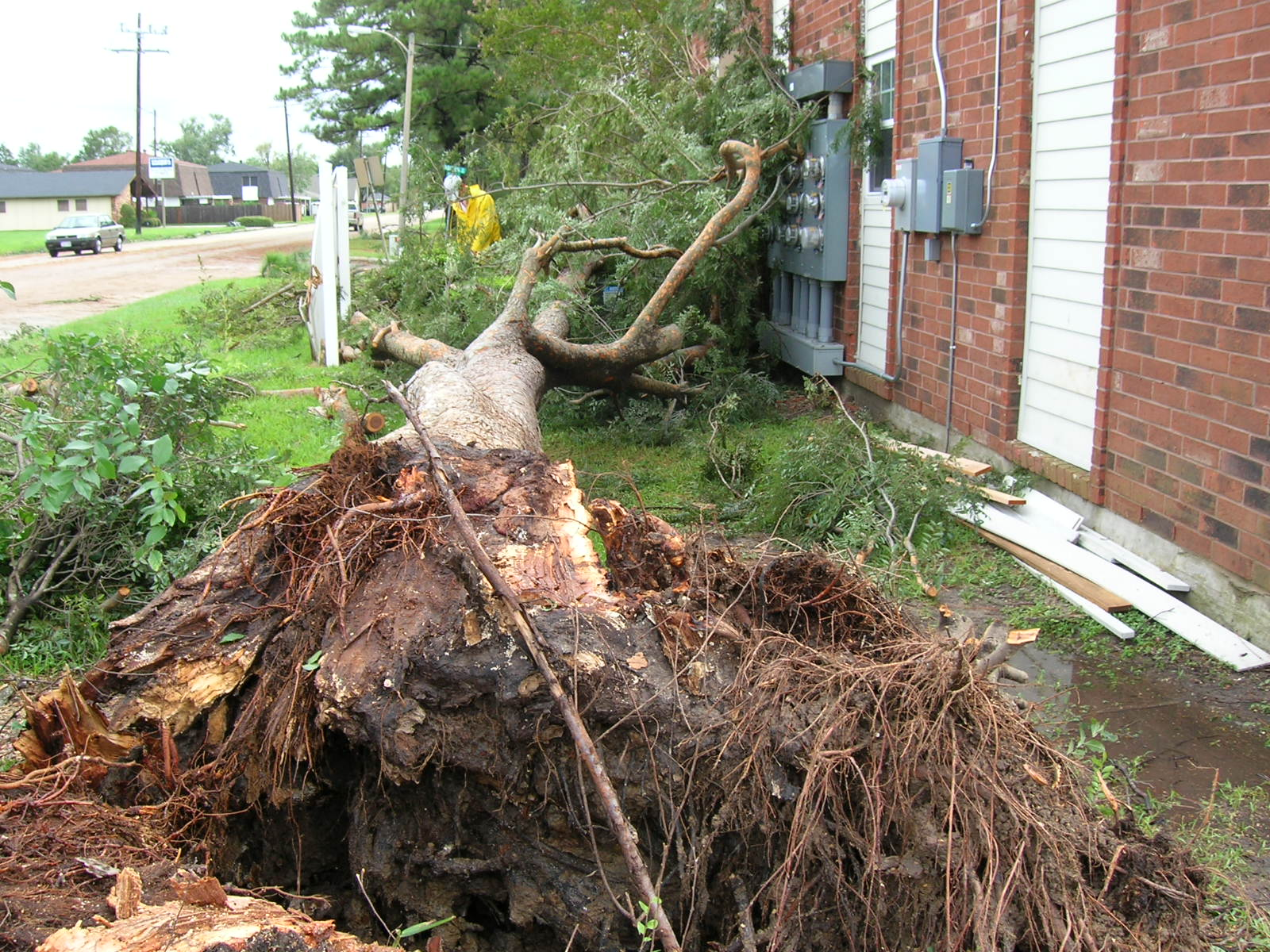
Damage from Hurricane Humberto (2007)

- July 20, 2005 – Hurricane Emily makes landfall in Tamaulipas, Mexico, providing rainfall to drought-affected areas of southern Texas. Rainfall peaks at 5.2 in (130 mm) in Mercedes, and is spread from about 1 to 3 in (25–76 mm) elsewhere.
- September 23, 2005 – Hurricane Rita makes landfall as a Category 3 hurricane on the border between Louisiana and Texas on September 23. In preparation for its landfall, the largest evacuation in United States history takes place, with over 3 million people evacuating inland. At one point during the storm, 1 million energy customers lose power due to outages. Rita causes a peak of 10.48 in (266 mm) in Center. Major flooding is reported in Port Arthur and Beaumont. Offshore oil platforms throughout Rita's path also suffer significant damage, though the refineries of Houston, originally thought to be at risk, escape the brunt of the storm. Many of the indirect deaths linked to Rita are caused by a single bus fire in mass evacuations out of Houston. Rita causes 59 deaths in the state all told.
- September 2, 2006 – The remnants of Hurricane John, an East Pacific storm, cause moderate to heavy rainfall. In northern Texas, moisture from the storm combined with a cold front produces rainfall of over 4 in (100 mm), helping alleviate severe drought.
- September 16, 2006 – Hurricane Lane, another East Pacific storm, makes landfall in the Mexican state of Sinaloa. Lane's remnants combine with an upper-level trough over southeast portions of the state, dropping over 5 in (130 mm) of rain in some locations.
- August 16, 2007 – Tropical Storm Erin makes landfall near Lamar as a minimal tropical storm. Rainfall peaks in Texas at 10.7 in (270 mm) in Sisterdale. Erin causes nine deaths in the state and causes nearly $49 million in damages.
- September 13, 2007 – Hurricane Humberto rapidly intensifies before making landfall just west of the Louisiana–Texas border with winds of up to 90 mph, dropping up to 14.13 in (359 mm) of rain. The storm kills one person and leaves $50 million in damage.
- September 29, 2007 – A remnant surface trough from Hurricane Lorenzo fuels severe thunderstorms near Port Aransas. Two tornadoes are reported, causing damage to several structures.

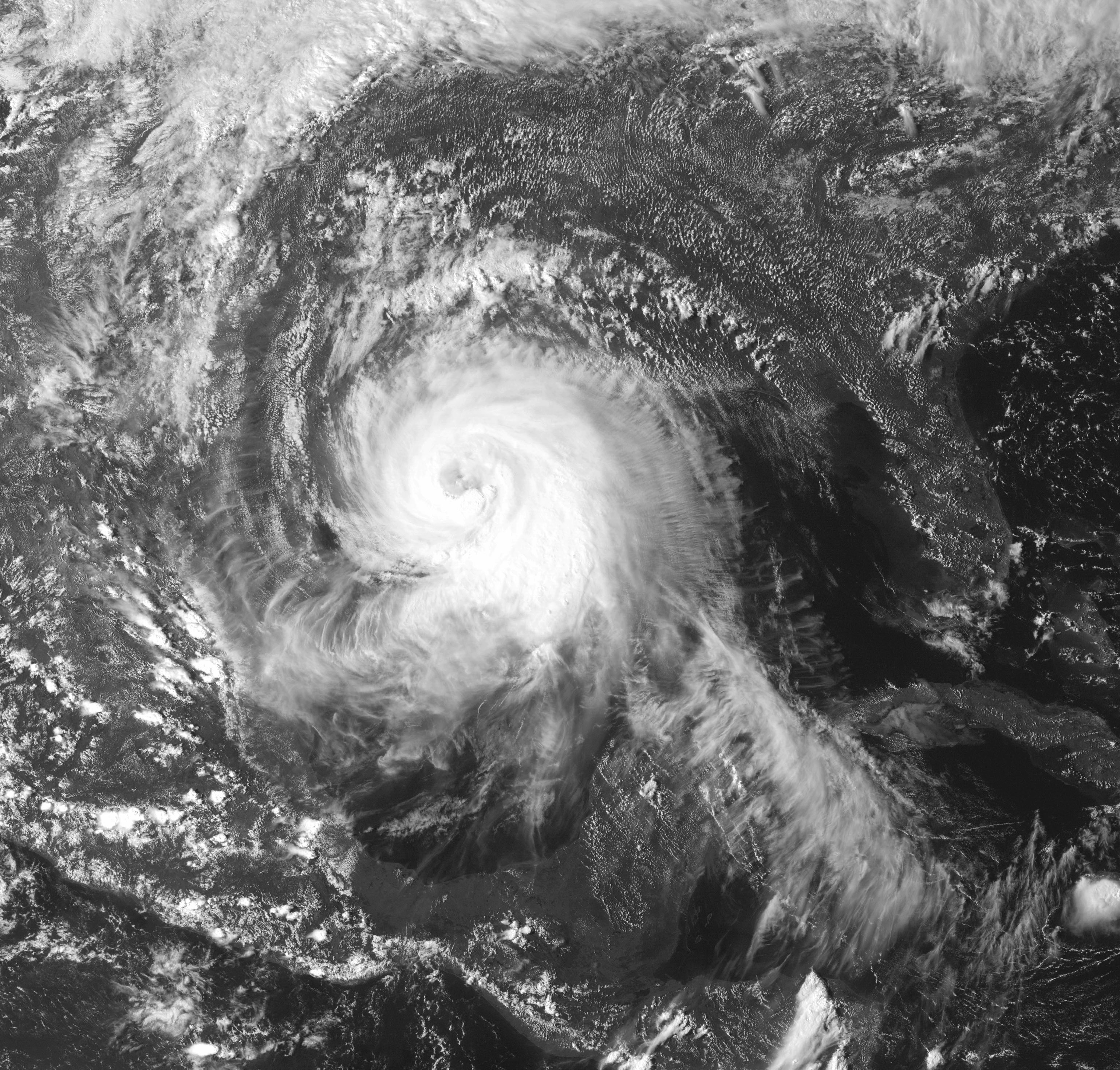
Hurricane Ike (2008) in the Gulf of Mexico

- July 23, 2008 – Hurricane Dolly makes landfall at South Padre Island with winds near 100 mph. A storm surge of 4 ft (1.2 m) is observed across much of the coast of southern Texas. Dolly's remnants cause coastal and inland flooding and over 12 in (300 mm) of rain in some locations, peaking at 15 in (380 mm) in Harlingen. On South Padre Island, moderate structural damage, mostly to roofs, is reported. Tree and utility pole damage is widespread across Cameron County. Widespread power outages are reported across southern Texas as a result of Dolly.
- August 5, 2008 – Tropical Storm Edouard makes landfall near Port Arthur with winds near 65 mph. Edouard provides beneficial rain to a drought-stricken central Texas.
- September 1, 2008 – Hurricane Gustav produces heavy rain to extreme East Texas as it makes landfall in Louisiana as a Category 2 hurricane. The storm causes strong rip currents and minor overwash of the coast.
- September 13, 2008 – Hurricane Ike makes landfall at Galveston as a large Category 2 hurricane. Its large size contributes to a storm surge that is as high as 20 ft (6.1 m), which inundates many of the barrier islands off the Texas coast. Many structures on the Bolivar Peninsula are destroyed. Most notably, in Gilchrist all but one house is destroyed by the storm surge. The storm also causes heavy rains where it makes landfall, peaking at 18.9 in (480 mm). At one point, the storm knocks out power to as many as an estimated 2.6 million people. Ike is one of the most destructive hurricanes ever to hit Texas and one of the deadliest, causing $19.3 billion in damages and killing 84 people.
- October 13, 2008 – Hurricane Norbert causes moderate rainfall over West Texas after moving inland from the eastern Pacific.
- November 10, 2009 – Hurricane Ida causes minimal effects on Texas, producing high tides that lead to road closures.

== 2010–2014 ==
Radar imagery of Tropical Storm Hermine moving across South Texas on September 7, 2010

- June 30, 2010 – Hurricane Alex makes landfall at Soto la Marina, Tamaulipas in Mexico as a large Category 2 hurricane, bringing heavy rains, wind, and tornadoes to South Texas. The hurricane's remnants also bring heavy rains to portions of the Rio Grande, causing it to exceed record levels.
- July 8, 2010 – Tropical Depression Two makes landfall on South Padre Island, dropping 1 to 3 in (25 to 76 mm) of rain in south Texas, peaking at 8.95 in (227 mm) in Chincorro. However, there are no reports of significant damage.
- September 7, 2010 – Tropical Storm Hermine makes landfall in northeastern Mexico as a strong tropical storm with 65 mph (105 km/h) winds. A storm surge of 3.4 ft (1.0 m) is reported at Port Aransas as the storm approaches the coast. In the Rio Grande Valley, an estimated 35,000 homes lose power due to Hermine, while in Bexar County, 100,000 customers lose power. Farm crops in the Texas Coastal Bend are also damaged by the strong winds and rain. In addition, numerous roads are closed due to overwash. Hermine kills five people and causes $240 million in damages in the state.
- June 30, 2011 – Tropical Storm Arlene makes landfall south of Texas near Cabo Rojo. The outer bands of Arlene produce 1 to 4 in (25–102 mm) of rain in southern Texas.
- July 30, 2011 – Tropical Storm Don makes landfall near Baffin Bay, Texas before quickly dissipating. The storm produces minimal rainfall in extreme southern Texas, peaking at 2.56 in (65 mm) in Bay City. Cotton farms benefit from the minimal rainfall.
- Early-September 2011 – The outer bands of Tropical Storm Lee cause light rain in eastern Texas, peaking at 3.97 in (101 mm) in Nederland. Despite the light rainfall, strong winds further inland help ignite numerous wildfires throughout the state. One of the fires, the Bastrop County Complex fire, destroys 1,700 homes and businesses, becoming the most destructive wildfire in Texas history.
- August 31, 2012 – Outer rainbands associated with Hurricane Isaac cause slight rainfall in East Texas, peaking at around 3 in (7.6 cm) near Galveston Bay. Strong winds associated with Isaac's thunderstorms knock down many trees in Trinity County, where wind gusts peak at an estimated 65 mph (105 km/h).
- September 29, 2012 – Moisture associated with the remnants of Hurricane Miriam and Tropical Storm Norman brings light rainfall over areas of Texas, slightly alleviating drought conditions. Rainfall in the state measures 1–4 in (25–102 mm), causing some flash flooding. Combined with a surface trough, the moisture generates severe thunderstorms which later coalesce into a squall line, bringing strong winds which cause numerous reports of window damage. A weather station near Paducah records a peak wind gust of 96 mph (154 km/h).
- August 26, 2013 – Moisture from Tropical Storm Fernand brings isolated thunderstorms to Coastal Bend.
- Mid-September 2013 – As Hurricane Ingrid passes to the south, its outer rainbands drop isolated areas of heavy rainfall across South Texas. Rainfall totals from the bands peak at approximately 3 in (76 mm) near the Texas border with Mexico.
- September 3, 2014 – Despite making landfall near Tampico, Mexico, the outer rainbands of Tropical Storm Dolly traverse South Texas, producing rainfall totals peaking at 2.91 in (74 mm) in Hidalgo County. After dissipating, moisture from the remnant system causes additional showers in the area. Urban flooding as a result of poor water drainage occurs in Brownsville, Edinburg, and McAllen. However, the heavy rainfall helps to alleviate some drought conditions in South Texas.
- September 20, 2014 – Flooding associated with the remnants of Hurricane Odile killed one sheriff's deputy in Austin.

== 2015–2019 ==
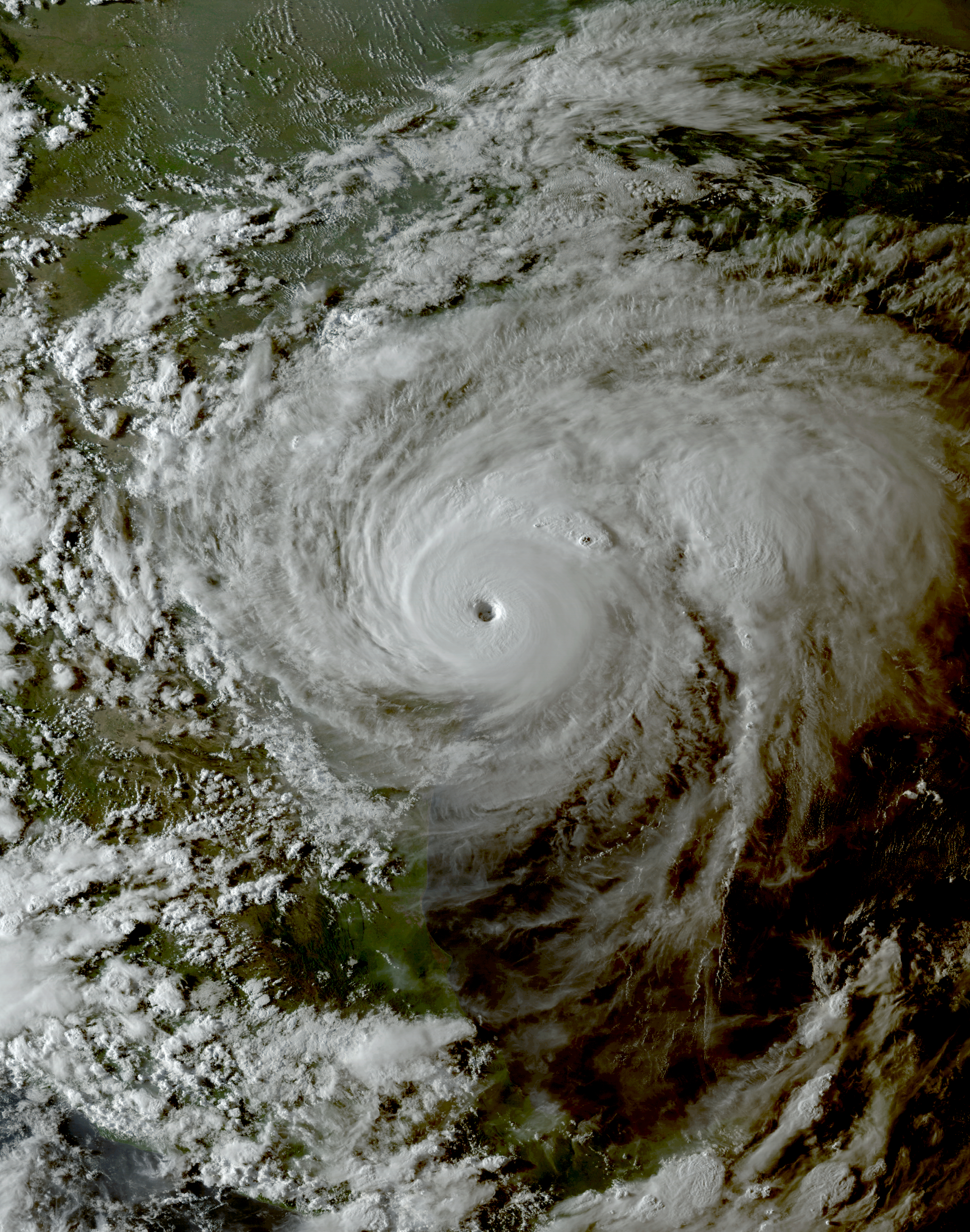
Hurricane Harvey shortly before peak intensity prior to landfall in southern Texas on August 25

- Mid-June 2015 – Tropical Storm Bill makes landfall on Matagorda Island with sustained winds of 60 mph (95 km/h), causing gusts peaking at 53 mph (85 km/h) in Palacios and Port O'Connor in addition to producing a 3 ft (0.9 m) storm surge in Port Lavaca. However, most of Bill's impacts in Texas are associated with heavy rainfall. Several isolated areas receive rainfall in excess of 10 in (25 cm) of rainfall, including a large swath of Victoria County. In Wharton, rainfall peaks at 13.05 in (331 mm).
- October 20–24, 2015 – Hurricane Patricia's remnants bring heavy rain to Texas. The maximum rainfall total is reported to be 20.87 in (530 mm) in Corsicana. This rain causes the flooding and closure of Interstate 45 in that area.
- September 8, 2016 – The remnants of Hurricane Newton bring heavy rains to parts of western Texas, however there are no reports of significant damage.
- June 22, 2017 – Tropical Storm Cindy makes landfall near Port Arthur with winds of 45 mph (70 km/h). One fatality takes place in Bolivar Peninsula.
- August 25, 2017 – Hurricane Harvey makes landfall on San José Island near Rockport as a Category 4 hurricane on August 25 with sustained winds of 130 mph (215 km/h). The Aransas County Airport in Rockport registers a peak wind gust of 145 mph (233 km/h) within Harvey's eyewall. Extensive wind damage occurs in Rockport and Fulton, with many roofs blown off and walls torn apart; widespread damage also befalls nearby communities. Storm surge inundates areas along San Antonio and Hynes bays under as much as 8–10 ft (2.4–3.0 m) of water, resulting in major flood conditions. Weak steering currents cause Harvey to slowly meander along the Texas Coastal Plain for several days, subjecting large swaths of the region to prolonged and torrential rainfall from the storm's rainbands. The rains constitute the most prolific rainfall event associated with a tropical cyclone in U.S. history, with the peak rainfall total of 60.58 in (1,539 mm) in Nederland, setting the national record for the largest rainfall total measured in connection to a tropical cyclone; at least 18 observing sites report amounts exceeding the previous record for the contiguous U.S. of 48 in (1,200 mm). The unprecedented scale of the rainfall in both extent and magnitude causes catastrophic flooding, displacing approximately 1.8 million people. Bayous in the Greater Houston area rapidly rise and overrun their banks, prompting evacuations and submerging parts of Houston; 60,049 residents are rescued. Parts of all 22 major freeways in the metropolitan area suffer inundation. Tens of thousands of homes in Southeast Texas are inundated by record flooding. In total, Harvey's effects destroyed 16,930 homes and damaged 290,063 homes. At least 68 deaths are directly attributed to Harvey's forces, making it the deadliest hurricane in Texas since 1919; an additional 35 deaths are indirectly attributed to Harvey. The NOAA estimates a $125 billion damage toll for Harvey, making it the second costliest hurricane in U.S. history when adjusting for inflation and the costliest hurricane in Texas history.
- July 14, 2019 – The outer rain bands of Hurricane Barry cause minor street flooding in Port Arthur and Port Neches.
- September 4, 2019 – Thunderstorms associated with Tropical Storm Fernand bring wind gusts up to 40 mph (64 km/h) in Port Aransas.
- September 17–19, 2019 – Tropical Storm Imelda makes landfall near Freeport, Texas with winds of 40 mph (64 km/h). The slow and erratic movement of the tropical cyclone produces widespread and catastrophic flooding across much of southeastern Texas. A peak rainfall total of 43.39 in (1,102 mm) is recorded at North Fork Taylor's Bayou in Jefferson County. Imelda's effects killed five people.

== 2020–present ==
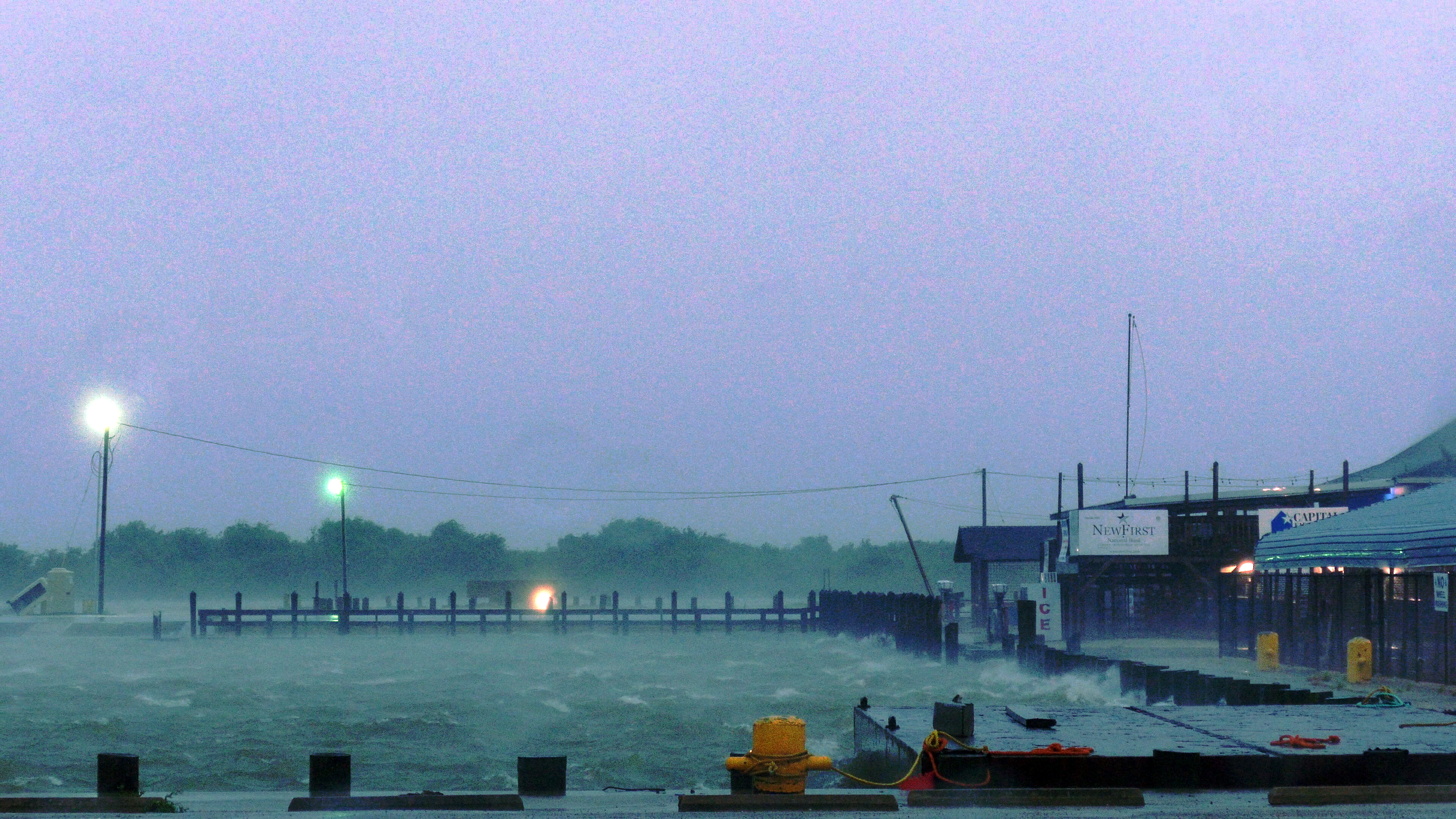
Matagorda during Hurricane Nicholas in 2021

- July 25, 2020 – Hurricane Hanna makes landfall roughly 12 mi (19 km) north-northwest of Port Mansfield with maximum sustained winds of 90 mph (150 km/h). Texas incurs over $1.1 billion in damage, sustaining heavy losses to crops in the Rio Grande Valley and widespread power outages affecting some 200,000 people. Five indirect deaths are attributed to the storm, including four from carbon monoxide poisoning in Edinburg. Rainfall totals of 6–12 in (150–300 mm) occur across the Rio Grande Valley, punctuated by a peak total of 15.49 in (393 mm) near Santa Rosa. The heavy rains trigger flash floods and prompt water rescues in Hidalgo and Cameron counties.
- August 26, 2020 – the western extent of Hurricane Laura impacts southeast Texas, bringing 60–110 mph (97–177 km/h) wind gusts and leaving Orange hardest-hit. More than 160,000 energy customers lose power, including about 90 percent of Orange County. Six people die of carbon monoxide poisoning in Laura's aftermath and an additional 18 people are treated for carbon monoxide injuries.
- Mid-September 2020 – the slow-moving Tropical Storm Beta causes extensive rainfall across southeast Texas, with a station in Brookside registering a peak accumulation of 15.77 in (401 mm). Significant flooding occurs in southern parts of Houston with damage to at least 20–25 homes; one person drowns in Brays Bayou.
- October 9, 2020 – Hurricane Delta makes landfall near Creole, Louisiana, as a Category 2 hurricane. Hurricane-force winds extend west into Southeast Texas, with the Southeast Texas Regional Airport registering a peak gust of 90 mph (140 km/h). Around 5–10 in (130–250 mm) of rain falls over the region. Power outages affected over 100,000 energy customers in Southeast Texas. Swells from Delta cause some beach erosion and coastal flooding throughout the Texas coast.
- September 14, 2021 – the slow-moving Hurricane Nicholas makes landfall on the eastern part of Matagorda Peninsula as a low-end Category 1 hurricane with sustained winds of 75 mph (121 km/h). Over 500,000 people lose power in the state's affected areas. Measured rainfall totals peak at 10.19 in (259 mm) in Freeport, though the NWS estimates totals of 10–15 in (250–380 mm) in the vicinity of Galveston. The damage from Nicholas is most considerable in Brazoria and Matagorda counties. Virtually all homes in Surfside Beach sustain damage.
- August 22, 2023 – Tropical Storm Harold makes landfall on Padre Island with estimated sustained winds of 50 mph (80 km/h). Wind gusts reached 67 mph (108 km/h) in Loyola Beach and 65 mph (105 km/h) in Corpus Christi. Approximately 20,000 electricity customers lost power in Texas, including over 12,000 American Electric Power power outages in Corpus Christi. Roughly 7 in (180 mm) of rain occurred on Mustang Island east of Corpus Christi.
- June 19–20, 2024 — Broad Tropical Storm Alberto brings heavy rains and flooding to the Texas Gulf Coast as it makes landfall in Tamaulipas, Mexico. One person died in Galveston as a result of rip currents produced by the storm.

The effect of power outages on night-time lighting in the aftermath of Hurricane Beryl

- July 8, 2024 – Hurricane Beryl makes landfall near Matagorda as a Category 1 hurricane during the early morning hours with maximum sustained winds of 80 mph (130 km/h). Surfside Beach experienced significant coastal flooding from storm surge. A peak wind gust of 97 mph (156 km/h) is recorded near Freeport, with William P. Hobby Airport and George Bush Intercontinental Airport gusting to as high as 84 mph (135 km/h) and 83 mph (134 km/h), respectively. Strong winds in the Houston area topple at least ten transmission towers and fell trees onto power lines. As many as 2.7 million electricity customers in the Houston area are left without power in the storm's aftermath, representing the most extensive power outage suffered by CenterPoint Energy. Rainfall accumulations of 8–12 in (200–300 mm) cover the Houston area, reaching as high as 14.88 in (378 mm) in Hilshire Village. Overflowing streams and bayous from Beryl's heavy rains flood roads, resulting in at least 25 water rescues. At least 42 fatalities are associated with Beryl in the state from both the storm's direct effects and the aftermath, including 20 in Harris County; many of the deaths are linked to high temperatures in the wake of the hurricane.
- June 29 – July 2, 2025 — Tropical Storm Barry dropped an average of 4.75 in (121 mm) of rain in Brownsville, 3.55 in (90 mm) in Harlingen, and 1.69 in (43 mm) in McAllen. Despite being far from the storm, North Padre Island experienced some effects. Gustier winds toppled beach canopies and tents; rough surf was also reported.
- September 5, 2025 — Remnant moisture from Hurricane Lorena fuels severe thunderstorms across the state. Several buildings are damaged by strong winds.
- June 17, 2026 — Short-lived Tropical Storm Arthur makes landfall in Matagorda County, becoming a post-tropical cyclone shortly after. Despite its minimal strength, the storm dropped rain of up to 8 in (200 mm) in parts of Freeport and Clute. Two flood-related deaths in the state are associated with the storm.
- July 23, 2026 – Tropical Storm Bertha makes landfall near the Texas–Louisiana border before tracking westward across Southeast Texas. The system brought high surf and minor flooding along the coast, dropping 1 to 2 inches (25 to 51 mm) of rain. Further inland in Harris County, isolated convective bands produced localized maximums of 3 to 5 inches (76 to 127 mm) causing localized street pooling before the system fully dissipated. No fatalities or injuries were reported.
- September 1, 2026 - Tropical Storm Edouard made landfall near Johnson Bayou, Louisiana, on the afternoon of September 1. Edouard brought strong winds to southeast Texas, with a maximum wind gust of 90 mph (140 km/h) measured in Port Arthur. Strong winds downed several trees and caused power outages. As the storm moved inland, it dropped torrential rainfall totals exceeding 20 in (510 mm) over southeast Texas, peaking in Hardin and Tyler counties where a flash flood emergency was declared.
- September 30, 2026 - Hurricane Polo brings tornadoes to areas of the Texas Panhandle.

== Monthly statistics ==
Number of recorded storms affecting Texas
Month	Number of storms
June	9
July	9
August	20
September	25
October	13
November	2

== Deadly storms ==
The following is a list of tropical storms with known deaths in the state.

Tropical Storms causing known deaths in Texas 1980 to present
Name	Year	Number of deaths	Notes
Harvey	2017	103	
Ike	2008	84	
Rita	2005	59	
Beryl	2024	44	
Allison	2001	23	
Alicia	1983	13	
Charley	1998	13	
Erin	2007	9	
Laura	2020	9	
Allen	1980	7	
Eight	1981	5	
Norma	1981	5	
Hermine	2010	5	
Imelda	2019	5	
Bonnie	1986	4	
Bret	1999	4	
Allison	1989	3	
Jerry	1989	3	
Chantal	1989	2	
Arthur	2026	2	

== See also ==
- Atlantic hurricane season
- List of Atlantic hurricanes
- List of Pacific hurricanes
- List of wettest known tropical cyclones affecting Texas
