= Ricardo, Texas =

- Census-designated place
- Location within Texas Location within the United States
- Coordinates: 27°25′17″N 97°51′04″W
- Country: United States
- State: Texas
- County: Kleberg

Area
  - Total: 4.46 sq mi (11.56 km^{2})
  - Land: 4.46 sq mi (11.56 km^{2})
  - Water: 0 sq mi (0.0 km^{2})
- Elevation: 53 ft (16 m)

Population (2010)
  - Total: 1,048
  - Density: 235/sq mi (90.7/km^{2})
- Time zone: UTC-6 (Central (CST))
  - Summer (DST): UTC-5 (CDT)
- ZIP code: 78363
- Area code: 361
- FIPS code: 48-61724
- GNIS feature ID: 1375725

Ricardo is a small census-designated place in Kleberg County, Texas, United States. As of the 2020 census, Ricardo had a population of 1,075.

Located on U.S. Highway 77 between Kingsville and Riviera, it consists of a farmers' co-op, a convenience store, and an elementary/junior high school.

== Education ==
The school district is Ricardo Independent School District. The school mascot is a Yellow Jacket.

Since no high school is in Ricardo ISD, students either attend Kaufer High School in Riviera (Riviera Independent School District), Academy High School in Kingsville (Santa Gertrudis Independent School District), or Henrietta M. King High School in Kingsville (Kingsville Independent School District).

Under Texas law, the Ricardo ISD area is in the boundary of Coastal Bend College (referred to in legislation under its former name, "Bee County College").

== Demographics ==
Historical population
Census	Pop.	Note	%±
2010	1,048		—
2020	1,075		2.6%
U.S. Decennial Census; 1850–1900 1910; 1920 1930 1940; 1950 1960 1970; 1980 1990 2000; 2010 2020

Ricardo first appeared as a census designated place in the 2010 U.S. census.

Ricardo CDP, Texas – Racial and ethnic composition Note: the US Census treats Hispanic/Latino as an ethnic category. This table excludes Latinos from the racial categories and assigns them to a separate category. Hispanics/Latinos may be of any race.
Race / Ethnicity (NH = Non-Hispanic)	Pop 2010	Pop 2020	% 2010	% 2020
White alone (NH)	259	226	24.71%	21.02%
Black or African American alone (NH)	5	0	0.48%	0.00%
Native American or Alaska Native alone (NH)	2	1	0.19%	0.09%
Asian alone (NH)	3	1	0.29%	0.09%
Native Hawaiian or Pacific Islander alone (NH)	1	0	0.10%	0.00%
Other race alone (NH)	7	1	0.67%	0.09%
Mixed race or Multiracial (NH)	6	14	0.57%	1.30%
Hispanic or Latino (any race)	765	832	73.00%	77.40%
Total	1,048	1,075	100.00%	100.00%

== See also ==
- Kingsville micropolitan area
