= Kingsville micropolitan area, Texas =

Kingsville micropolitan area
- Micropolitan Statistical Area
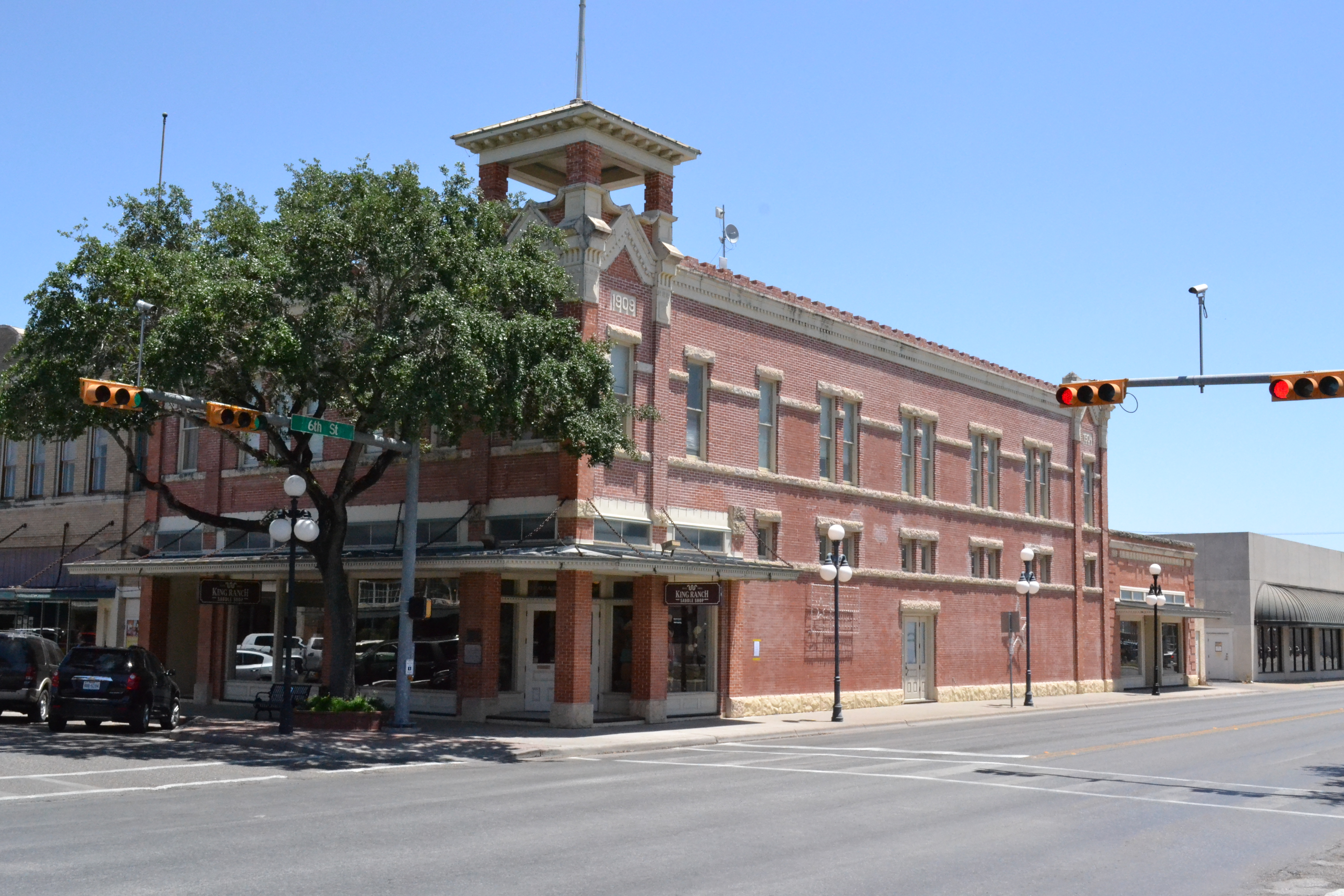
- Ragland Mercantile Company Building in downtown Kingsville
Interactive map of Corpus Christi–Kingsville–Alice, TX CSA
City of Corpus Christi
Corpus Christi MSA
Alice µSA
Kingsville µSA
- Country: United States
- State: Texas
- Time zone: UTC-6 (CST)
  - Summer (DST): UTC-5 (CDT)

The Kingsville micropolitan statistical area is a micropolitan area in South Texas that covers one sole county–Kleberg. The micropolitan statistical area once included Kenedy County, but it was detached in 2023. It is also part of the larger Corpus Christi–Kingsville–Alice Combined Statistical Area.

== Counties ==
- Kenedy formerly a part
- Kleberg

== Communities ==
- Armstrong (unincorporated)
- Kingsville (principal city)
- Loyola Beach (unincorporated)
- Ricardo (unincorporated)
- Riviera (unincorporated)
- Sarita (unincorporated)
- Vattmann (unincorporated)

== Demographics ==
As of the census of 2000, 31,963 people, 11,034 households, and 7,791 families were residing within the area. The racial makeup of the area was 71.78% White, 3.66% African American, 0.61% Native American, 1.46% Asian, 0.10% Pacific Islander, 19.17% from other races, and 3.23% from two or more races. Hispanics or Latinos of any race were 65.58% of the population.

The median income for a household in the USA was $27,157 and for a family was $29,887. Males had a median income of $24,652 versus $15,841 for females. The per capita income for the USA was $15,751.

== See also ==
- List of cities in Texas
- Texas census statistical areas
- List of Texas metropolitan areas
