= Kenedy County Wide Common School District =

School district in Texas, United States

Address
- 150 East La Parra Street Sarita, TX, 78385; United States
- Coordinates: 26.863°N 97.698°W

District information
- Grades: PK–6
- Schools: 1
- NCES District ID: 4825410

Students and staff
- Students: 130 (2023–2024)
- Teachers: 10.77 (on an FTE basis)
- Student–teacher ratio: 12.07:1

Other information
- Website: www.saritaschool.net

Kenedy County Wide Common School District is a public school district based in the community of Sarita in unincorporated Kenedy County, Texas, United States. The district has one campus, Sarita Elementary School, which serves students in grades pre-kindergarten through six.

Almost all of Kenedy County is within the KCWCSD service area. As of 2001, of the nine Texas counties having only one school apiece, the population of Sarita Elementary School was the smallest.

Students who graduate from Sarita Elementary move on to De La Paz Middle School and Kaufer Early College High School, operated by the Riviera Independent School District, which takes all secondary students from the KCWCSD area.

In 2009, the school district was rated "recognized" by the Texas Education Agency.

== See also ==
- Non-high school district
