= Peñascal Wind Power Project =

Wind farm in Texas, USA

- Official name: Peñascal Wind Power Project
- Country: United States
- Location: Kenedy County, Texas
- Coordinates: 27°06′44″N 97°32′26″W
- Construction began: 2008
- Commission date: Gradually through 2015
- Owner: Iberdrola
- Operator: Avangrid

Wind farm
- Type: Onshore

Power generation
- Units operational: 269 turbines
- Make and model: Mitsubishi MWT-92 2.4MW, Gamesa G97 2.0MW
- Nameplate capacity: 605.2 MW
- Capacity factor: 30.9% (average 2016-2019)
- Annual net output: 1,636 GW·h

The 605.2 megawatt (MW) Peñascal Wind Farm project is located south of Baffin Bay in Kenedy County, Texas. It was built in three phases by Iberdrola and Mortenson Construction. It became Iberdrola's largest renewable energy facility in the world after completion of the second phase in 2010.

== Details ==
The first two construction phases of the wind farm each have 84 Mitsubishi MWT-92 2.4 MW wind turbines. Around 200 people were involved in the construction. Phase I was completed in April 2009, and Phase II came online in April 2010.

The facility also created about 20 long-term jobs in maintenance and operation. Iberdrola received a $114 million treasury grant for the project as part of the stimulus funds that was released in September 2009. On July 30, 2010, the U.S. Treasury's 1603 Program website listed the Penascal II Wind Project as having received a total award amount of $222,861,149.

Phase three of the project consists of 101 Gamesa G97 2.0 MW wind turbines. Construction began in 2013 and was completed in 2015.

The wind farm includes an innovative radar system that detects the arrival of large flocks of migratory birds and shuts down the turbines if visibility conditions present a danger.

== Electricity production ==
Peñascal Wind Project electricity generation (MW·h)
Year	Peñascal 1 (201.6 MW)	Peñascal 2 (201.6 MW)	Baffin (202 MW)	Total annual MW·h
2008	87*	-	-	87
2009	376,572*	-	-	376,572
2010	595,498	333,048*	-	928,546
2011	619,812	666,210	-	1,286,022
2012	636,724	584,703	-	1,221,427
2013	608,004	576,422	-	1,184,426
2014	564,882	528,958	-	1,093,840
2015	446,547	460,217	356,943*	1,263,707
2016	510,071	469,891	532,618	1,512,580
2017	588,153	525,946	624,903	1,739,002
2018	576,536	522,695	628,961	1,728,192
2019	494,618	462,752	607,698	1,565,068
Average annual production (years 2016-2019)				1,636,210
Average capacity factor (years 2016-2019)				30.9%

(*) partial year of operation

== See also ==
- Wind power in Texas
- Environmental impact of wind power
- List of wind farms in the United States
