= Loyola Beach, Texas =

- Interactive map of Loyola Beach, Texas
- Coordinates: 27°17′55″N 97°48′54″W
- Country: United States
- State: Texas
- County: Kleberg

Population
  - Total: 1,597
- Time zone: CST
  - Summer (DST): CDT
- ZIP code: 78379
- Area code: 361
- GNIS feature ID: 1340705

Loyola Beach is an unincorporated community in Kleberg County, Texas, United States. Leo Kaufer Park is located in Loyola Beach, with a fishing pier, boat dock, and playground.

== Education ==
Education is provided by Riviera Independent School District and Ricardo Independent School District.

== See also ==
- Kingsville micropolitan area
