= Sarita, Texas =

- County seat and unincorporated community
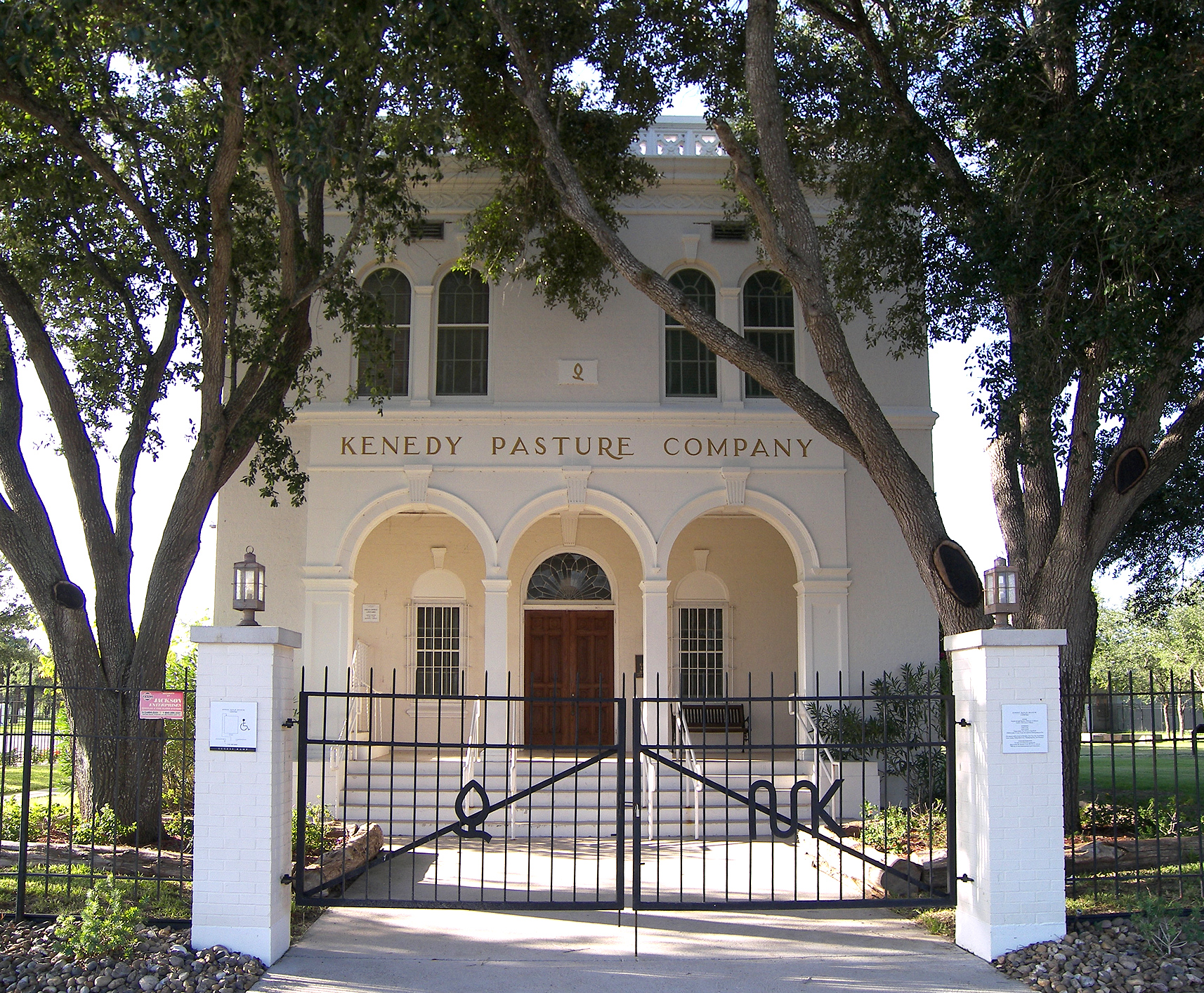
- The Kenedy Pasture Company headquarters in Sarita

- Location in Kenedy County, Texas

- Location in Texas and the United States Sarita (the United States)
- Coordinates: 27°13′18″N 97°47′21″W
- Country: United States
- State: Texas
- County: Kenedy

Area
  - Total: 1.22 sq mi (3.17 km^{2})
  - Land: 1.19 sq mi (3.08 km^{2})
  - Water: 0.035 sq mi (0.09 km^{2})
- Elevation: 36 ft (11 m)

Population (2020)
  - Total: 205
  - Density: 200/sq mi (77.3/km^{2})
- Time zone: UTC−6 (Central (CST))
  - Summer (DST): UTC−5 (CDT)
- ZIP code: 78385
- Area code: 361
- FIPS code: 48-65876
- GNIS feature ID: 1346706

Sarita is a census-designated place (CDP) in, and the county seat of, Kenedy County, Texas, United States. It is the only settlement of note in the county, and as of the 2020 census, Sarita had a population of 205.

== History ==
In 1904, the town of Sarita was founded on land that had been part of Kenedy Ranch. John G. Kenedy named the town after his daughter, Sarita Kenedy East. The town served the Kenedy Pasture Company and Kenedy Ranch and its employees. The company store, ranch offices, and ranch buildings have been located in Sarita. Most of the residents were somehow involved in the Kenedy businesses, either as employees or tenant cotton farmers from Kenedy Pasture Company. The Kenedy Ranch Museum, with art and artifacts about the history of the Kenedy family in South Texas, opened in 2003 in the newly restored Kenedy Pasture Company building.

=== "Occupation" hoax ===
In 2014, a fake news website called National Report published an article claiming that a militia of "over 100 armed La Raza militants" had occupied Sarita, forcing original residents out of their homes and using the town as a base of operations. The hoax report was circulated on the Internet.

== Geography ==
Sarita is located in northern Kenedy County at 27°13′18″N, 97°47′21″W. It is along U.S. Route 77, 21 miles (34 km) south of Kingsville, 61 miles (98 km) south of Corpus Christi, and 74 miles (119 km) north of Harlingen. The United States Border Patrol Sarita checkpoint on US 77 is located some 14 miles (23 km) south of the town of Sarita.

=== Cityscape ===
Gary Cartwright of Texas Monthly said that Sarita's only landmarks were a green sign reading "Sarita", a water tower, and a blinking yellow light. Sarita has an elementary school and a Catholic church. Sarita does not have any convenience stores, shops, or cafes. The nearest grocery store is in Kingsville, though convenience stores at gas stations are in Riviera, 5 miles (8 km) to the north along US 77. The nearest major medical center is in Corpus Christi.

=== Climate ===
The climate in this area is characterized by hot, humid summers and generally mild to cool winters. According to the Köppen climate classification, Sarita has a humid subtropical climate, Cfa on climate maps.

== Demographics ==
Historical population
| Census | Pop. | Note | %± |
|---|---|---|---|
| 2010 | 238 | | — |
| 2020 | 205 | | −13.9% |
U.S. Decennial Census; 1850–1900 1910; 1920 1930 1940; 1950 1960 1970; 1980 1990 2000; 2010 2020

Sarita first appeared as a census designated place in the 2010 U.S. census.

Sarita CDP, Texas – Racial and ethnic composition Note: the US Census treats Hispanic/Latino as an ethnic category. This table excludes Latinos from the racial categories and assigns them to a separate category. Hispanics/Latinos may be of any race.
| Race / Ethnicity (NH = Non-Hispanic) | Pop 2010 | Pop 2020 | % 2010 | % 2020 |
|---|---|---|---|---|
| White alone (NH) | 40 | 31 | 16.81% | 15.12% |
| Black or African American alone (NH) | 1 | 0 | 0.42% | 0.00% |
| Native American or Alaska Native alone (NH) | 6 | 3 | 2.52% | 1.46% |
| Asian alone (NH) | 0 | 0 | 0.00% | 0.00% |
| Native Hawaiian or Pacific Islander alone (NH) | 0 | 1 | 0.00% | 0.49% |
| Other race alone (NH) | 2 | 1 | 0.84% | 0.49% |
| Mixed or multiracial (NH) | 1 | 1 | 0.42% | 0.49% |
| Hispanic or Latino (any race) | 188 | 168 | 78.99% | 81.95% |
| Total | 238 | 205 | 100.00% | 100.00% |

As of the 2020 United States census, 205 people, 129 households, and 115 families resided in the CDP.

== Education ==
Sarita Elementary School (prekindergarten-grade 6) of the Kenedy County Wide Common School District serves Sarita.

Students who graduate from Sarita Elementary move on to De La Paz Middle School and Kaufer Early College High School, operated by Riviera Independent School District, which takes all secondary students from the KCWCSD area.

All of Kenedy County is in the area of Del Mar College, according to the Texas Education Code.

== Notable people ==
- Tony de la Rosa, born on the Kenedy Ranch in Sarita on November 1, 1931; an accordionist and conjunto band leader. He has a street named after him in Sarita.

== See also ==
- Kingsville micropolitan area
