= Riviera Independent School District =

School district in Texas, United States

Address
- 203 Seahawk Dr Riviera, Kleberg County, Texas, 78379-3500; United States

District information
- Motto: We Respect, We Care, We Serve, We Believe, We Lead, and We ALL Make a Difference!
- Grades: PreK-12
- Superintendent: Tarrah Dobson
- Schools: 3
- NCES District ID: 4837320

Students and staff
- Students: 479
- Student–teacher ratio: 1 Teacher : 16 Students
- District mascot: Seahawk
- Colors: Green & White

Other information
- Website: https://www.rivieraisd.us

Riviera Independent School District is a public school district serving about 479 students from Pre-K through 12 Grade. It is based in the community of Riviera, Texas.

Located mostly in Kleberg County, a very small portion of the district extends into Kenedy County. It includes the small portion of Corpus Christi in Kleberg County.

Riviera ISD is currently a 2A school and has three campuses; Nanny Elementary (Grades PK-5), De La Paz Middle School (Grades 6-8), and Kaufer Early College High School (Grades 9-12). Their Mascot is the Seahaw and their colors are green and white.

== History ==
In 2009, the school district was rated "academically acceptable" by the Texas Education Agency.

On July 1, 1993, the Laureles Independent School District merged into Riviera ISD.

== Schools ==
- Nanny Elementary School
- De La Paz Middle School
- Kaufer Early College High School
  - High school students from Kenedy Countywide Common School District and Ricardo Independent School District move on to Kaufer. Ricardo ISD includes Ricardo and a small portion of southern Kingsville. KCCSD includes the remainder of Kenedy County (that is not directly in Riviera ISD), including Sarita.
