= Kenedy County, Texas =

County in Texas, United States

- County
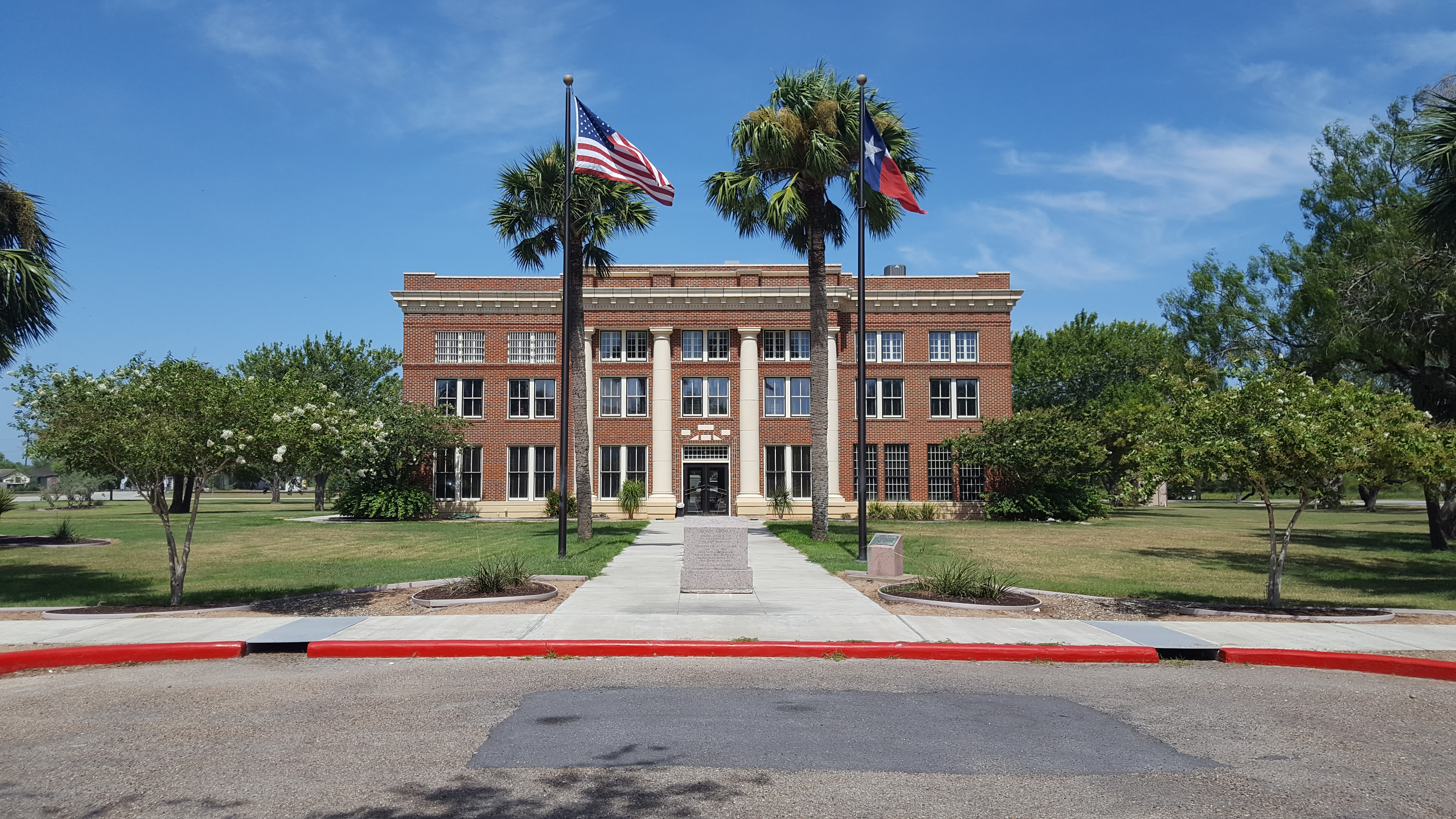
- The Kenedy County Courthouse in Sarita

- Location within the U.S. state of Texas
- Coordinates: 26°56′N 97°37′W
- Country: United States
- State: Texas
- Founded: 1921
- Named for: Mifflin Kenedy
- Seat: Sarita
- Largest community: Sarita

Area
  - Total: 1,946 sq mi (5,040 km^{2})
  - Land: 1,458 sq mi (3,780 km^{2})
  - Water: 487 sq mi (1,260 km^{2}) 25%

Population (2020)
  - Total: 350
  - Estimate (2025): 319 ▼
  - Density: 0.24/sq mi (0.093/km^{2})
- Time zone: UTC−6 (Central)
  - Summer (DST): UTC−5 (CDT)
- Congressional district: 34th
- Website: www.kenedycountytx.gov

Kenedy County is a county located in the U.S. state of Texas. As of the 2020 census, its population was 350. It is the third-least populous county in Texas and fourth-least populous in the United States. Its county seat is Sarita. The county was created in 1921 from parts of Hidalgo and Willacy counties and is named for Mifflin Kenedy, an early area rancher and steamboat operator.

Kenedy County is included in the Kingsville, TX Kingsville Micropolitan Statistical Area, which is also included in the Corpus Christi-Kingsville-Alice, TX Combined Statistical Area. There are no incorporated municipalities in Kenedy County.

In 1999, Hurricane Bret struck the county, but damage was minimal due to the sparse population. The Peñascal Wind Power Project was built near Sarita in the early 21st Century and is expected to slightly raise the population of the area.

The King Ranch, of which Mifflin Kenedy had been a partner prior to 1868, covers a large part of the county.

== Geography ==
According to the United States Census Bureau, the county has a total area of 1,946 square miles (5,040 km^{2}), of which 1,458 square miles (3,780 km^{2}) is land and 487 square miles (1,260 km^{2}) (25%) is water. In total area, Kenedy is the 13th largest county in Texas. In land area only, it is the 25th-largest county in Texas. It borders the Gulf of Mexico. Baffin Bay makes up much of the border with Kleberg County.

=== Major highways ===
US 77 is the only highway (federal or state) in Kenedy County.

- U.S. Highway 77
  - Interstate 69E is currently under construction and will follow the current route of U.S. 77 in most places.

== Adjacent counties ==
- Kleberg County (north)
- Willacy County (south)
- Hidalgo County (southwest)
- Brooks County (west)

=== National protected area ===
- Padre Island National Seashore (part)

== Demographics ==
Historical population
Census	Pop.	Note	%±
1920	1,033		—
1930	701		−32.1%
1940	700		−0.1%
1950	632		−9.7%
1960	884		39.9%
1970	678		−23.3%
1980	543		−19.9%
1990	460		−15.3%
2000	414		−10.0%
2010	416		0.5%
2020	350		−15.9%
2025 (est.)	319	▼	−8.9%
U.S. Decennial Census; 1850–2010 2010-2020

=== Racial and ethnic composition ===
Kenedy County, Texas – Racial and ethnic composition Note: the US Census treats Hispanic/Latino as an ethnic category. This table excludes Latinos from the racial categories and assigns them to a separate category. Hispanics/Latinos may be of any race.
Race / Ethnicity (NH = Non-Hispanic)	Pop 1980	Pop 1990	Pop 2000	Pop 2010	Pop 2020	% 1980	% 1990	% 2000	% 2010	% 2020
White alone (NH)	92	93	84	86	73	16.94%	20.22%	20.29%	20.67%	20.86%
Black or African American alone (NH)	0	0	0	1	0	0.00%	0.00%	0.00%	0.24%	0.00%
Native American or Alaska Native alone (NH)	1	0	1	6	7	0.18%	0.00%	0.24%	1.44%	2.00%
Asian alone (NH)	0	0	2	1	0	0.00%	0.00%	0.48%	0.24%	0.00%
Native Hawaiian or Pacific Islander alone (NH)	x	x	0	0	1	x	x	0.00%	0.00%	0.29%
Other race alone (NH)	0	5	0	2	2	0.00%	1.09%	0.00%	0.48%	0.57%
Mixed race or Multiracial (NH)	x	x	0	1	6	x	x	0.00%	0.24%	1.71%
Hispanic or Latino (any race)	450	362	327	319	261	82.87%	78.70%	78.99%	76.68%	74.57%
Total	543	460	414	416	350	100.00%	100.00%	100.00%	100.00%	100.00%

=== 2020 census ===
As of the 2020 census, the county had a population of 350. The median age was 41.0 years. 23.7% of residents were under the age of 18 and 15.4% of residents were 65 years of age or older. For every 100 females there were 93.4 males, and for every 100 females age 18 and over there were 99.3 males age 18 and over.

The racial makeup of the county was 39.1% White, 0.3% Black or African American, 2.0% American Indian and Alaska Native, <0.1% Asian, 0.3% Native Hawaiian and Pacific Islander, 22.0% from some other race, and 36.3% from two or more races. Hispanic or Latino residents of any race comprised 74.6% of the population.

<0.1% of residents lived in urban areas, while 100.0% lived in rural areas.

There were 131 households in the county, of which 43.5% had children under the age of 18 living in them. Of all households, 38.2% were married-couple households, 22.9% were households with a male householder and no spouse or partner present, and 29.0% were households with a female householder and no spouse or partner present. About 19.1% of all households were made up of individuals and 8.4% had someone living alone who was 65 years of age or older.

There were 196 housing units, of which 33.2% were vacant. Among occupied housing units, 55.7% were owner-occupied and 44.3% were renter-occupied. The homeowner vacancy rate was 3.4% and the rental vacancy rate was 13.0%.

=== 2000 census ===
As of the census in 2000, there were 414 people, 138 households, and 110 families residing in the county. The population density was 0.28 people per square mile (0.11 people/km^{2}). There were 281 housing units at an average density of 0.19 units per square mile (0.073/km^{2}). The racial makeup of the county was 64.49% White, 0.72% Black or African American, 0.72% Native American, 0.48% Asian, 31.88% from other races, and 1.69% from two or more races. 78.99% of the population were Hispanic or Latino of any race.

There were 138 households, out of which 35.50% had children under the age of 18 living with them, 58.70% were married couples living together, 10.90% had a female householder with no husband present, and 19.60% were non-families. 18.80% of all households were made up of individuals, and 6.50% had someone living alone who was 65 years of age or older. The average household size was 2.97 and the average family size was 3.26.

In the county, the population had widespread age groups including 29.20% under the age of 18, 9.70% from 18 to 24, 26.30% from 25 to 44, 24.20% from 45 to 64, and 10.60% who were 65 years of age or older. The median age was 34 years old. For every 100 females, there were 110.20 males. For every 100 females age 18 and over, there were 100.70 males.

The median income for a household in the county was $25,000, and the median income for a family was $26,719. Males had a median income of $18,125 versus $12,188 for females. The per capita income for the county was $17,959. 15.30% of the population and 9.90% of families were below the poverty line. Out of the total people living in poverty, 15.60% are under the age of 18 and 18.80% are 65 or older.

Kenedy County, the third least populous county in Texas, had 108 times more cattle than people in 1999.

== Education ==
Almost all of Kenedy County is served by Sarita Elementary School (PreK-6) of the Kenedy County Wide Common School District. As of 2001, of the schools in the nine Texas counties having only one school apiece, the population of Sarita Elementary School was the smallest. A small portion of Kenedy County is served by the Riviera Independent School District for all grades K-12. Students who graduate from Sarita Elementary move on to De La Paz Middle School and Kaufer Early College High School, operated by Riviera ISD, which takes all secondary students from the KCWCSD area.

Del Mar College is the designated community college for all of Kenedy County.

== Communities ==
=== Census-designated place ===
- Sarita (county seat)

=== Unincorporated community ===
- Armstrong

== Politics ==
Like the rest of South Texas, Kenedy County has historically supported candidates from the Democratic Party. The Republican Party has carried the county only eight times since the 1924 presidential election. Despite its historic Democratic lean, the county has become competitive in recent years, with Republican Mitt Romney's performance in 2012, and Republican Donald Trump's latest two performances in 2020 and 2024.

In 2020, Trump carried the county with over 65% of the vote, making him the strongest Republican margin since 1956, and Kenedy was one of only fifteen counties to flip from supporting Hillary Clinton in 2016 to Trump in 2020. Trump's performance within the county at 2024 would end up even more successful, at nearly 73% of the vote. Kenedy County had the longest losing streak in the nation, being the only county to flip from Barack Obama to Mitt Romney, then to Clinton, and then to Trump in his unsuccessful second bid. However, the county would again support Trump in his more successful 2024 election, putting an end to this long streak, since Trump won the 2024 election. Since 2000, the county has only voted for two winners; Obama in 2008, and Trump in 2024, and since 1980 it has only voted for the winning candidate four times: (Bill Clinton in both his campaigns as well as Obama in 2008, and Trump in 2024). The county has also become Republican-leaning in non-presidential elections, as Republican Senator Ted Cruz won the county in his narrow 2018 victory over Beto O’Rourke and the county voted Republican in every statewide election in 2018. However, despite underperforming Joe Biden by 11 points, Democrat Dan Sanchez won the county in his loss to Republican Mayra Flores in the 2022 Texas's 34th district special election. Flores subsequently carried the county in her unsuccessful bid for a full term that November.

United States presidential election results for Kenedy County, Texas
Year	Republican		Democratic		Third party(ies)	
Year	No.	%	No.	%	No.	%
1924	7	9.33%	67	89.33%	1	1.33%
1928	12	9.23%	118	90.77%	0	0.00%
1932	5	3.88%	123	95.35%	1	0.78%
1936	30	23.81%	96	76.19%	0	0.00%
1940	68	64.15%	38	35.85%	0	0.00%
1944	60	73.17%	16	19.51%	6	7.32%
1948	31	38.27%	45	55.56%	5	6.17%
1952	108	88.52%	14	11.48%	0	0.00%
1956	125	92.59%	10	7.41%	0	0.00%
1960	74	48.68%	78	51.32%	0	0.00%
1964	30	20.55%	115	78.77%	1	0.68%
1968	76	41.53%	100	54.64%	7	3.83%
1972	124	58.22%	88	41.31%	1	0.47%
1976	65	31.71%	139	67.80%	1	0.49%
1980	76	40.64%	106	56.68%	5	2.67%
1984	96	46.38%	110	53.14%	1	0.48%
1988	76	38.78%	119	60.71%	1	0.51%
1992	69	39.66%	87	50.00%	18	10.34%
1996	71	34.13%	133	63.94%	4	1.92%
2000	106	46.49%	119	52.19%	3	1.32%
2004	82	48.52%	85	50.30%	2	1.18%
2008	94	46.53%	108	53.47%	0	0.00%
2012	84	50.30%	82	49.10%	1	0.60%
2016	84	45.16%	99	53.23%	3	1.61%
2020	127	65.46%	65	33.51%	2	1.03%
2024	115	72.78%	41	25.95%	2	1.27%

United States Senate election results for Kenedy County, Texas1
Year	Republican		Democratic		Third party(ies)	
Year	No.	%	No.	%	No.	%
2024	92	63.89%	48	33.33%	4	2.78%

United States Senate election results for Kenedy County, Texas2
Year	Republican		Democratic		Third party(ies)	
Year	No.	%	No.	%	No.	%
2020	107	63.31%	57	33.73%	5	2.96%

Texas Gubernatorial election results for Kenedy County
Year	Republican		Democratic		Third party(ies)	
Year	No.	%	No.	%	No.	%
2022	109	71.24%	42	27.45%	2	1.31%

In statewide races for governor and the U.S. Senate, the county has slowly trended Republican. The last Democrat to carry the county in a gubernatorial race was Tony Sanchez in 2002, while Rick Noriega in 2008 is the last Democrat to carry it in a senatorial race.

== See also ==
- List of museums in the Texas Gulf Coast
- National Register of Historic Places listings in Kenedy County, Texas
- Recorded Texas Historic Landmarks in Kenedy County
