= Kleberg County, Texas =

County in Texas, United States

- County
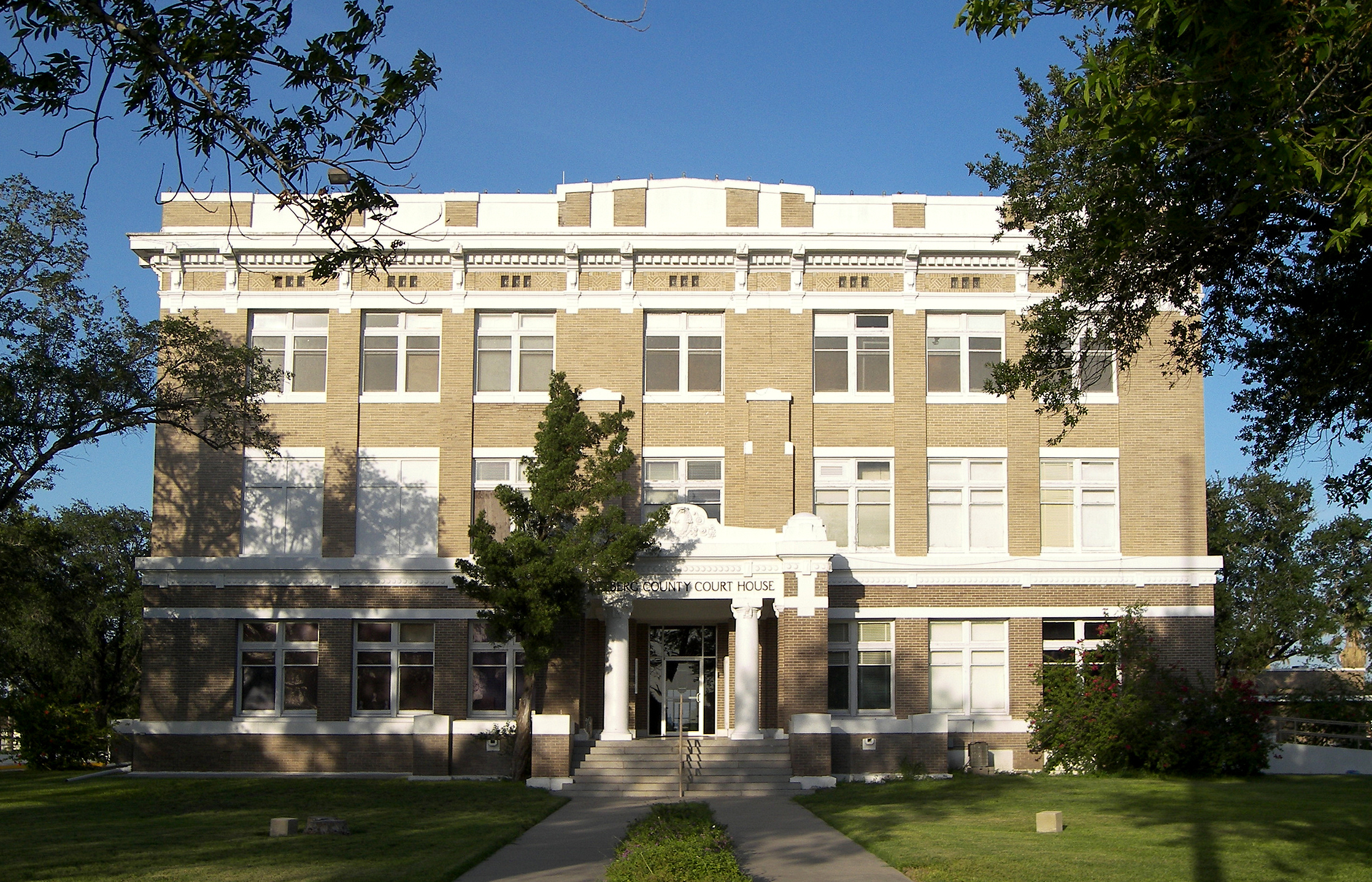
- The Kleberg County Courthouse in Kingsville. The building was added to the National Register of Historic Places on May 10, 2010.

- Location within the U.S. state of Texas
- Coordinates: 27°26′N 97°40′W
- Country: United States
- State: Texas
- Founded: 1913
- Named for: Robert J. Kleberg
- Seat: Kingsville
- Largest city: Kingsville

Area
  - Total: 1,090 sq mi (2,800 km^{2})
  - Land: 881 sq mi (2,280 km^{2})
  - Water: 209 sq mi (540 km^{2}) 19%

Population (2020)
  - Estimate (2025): 30,315 ▼
- Time zone: UTC−6 (Central)
  - Summer (DST): UTC−5 (CDT)
- Congressional district: 34th

Kleberg County is a county in the U.S. state of Texas. As of the 2020 census, its population was 31,040. The county seat is Kingsville. The county was organized in 1913 and is named for Robert J. Kleberg, an early settler.

Kleberg County is part of the Kingsville, TX Micropolitan Statistical Area, which is also part of the Corpus Christi-Kingsville-Alice, TX Combined Statistical Area. Most of the county's land lies in the famed King Ranch, which also extends into neighboring counties.

== History ==
The county was organized in 1913 and was named for Robert J. Kleberg, an early settler.

In 1997, the county commissioners designated "HeavenO" as the county's official greeting because of a taboo stemming from "Hello"'s perceived connotations of Hell.

== Geography ==
According to the U.S. Census Bureau, the county has a total area of 1,090 square miles (2,800 km^{2}), of which 881 square miles (2,280 km^{2}) is land and 209 square miles (540 km^{2}) (19%) is water. It borders the Gulf of Mexico. Baffin Bay makes up a large part of the border with Kenedy County.

=== Major highways ===
- Interstate 69E (Under Construction)
- U.S. Highway 77
- State Highway 141
- State Highway 285
- Spur 169
- Farm to Market Road 771
- Park Road 22

=== Adjacent counties ===
- Nueces County (north)
- Kenedy County (south)
- Brooks County (southwest)
- Jim Wells County (west)

=== National protected area ===
- Padre Island National Seashore (part)

== Demographics ==
Historical population
Census	Pop.	Note	%±
1920	7,837		—
1930	12,451		58.9%
1940	13,344		7.2%
1950	21,991		64.8%
1960	30,052		36.7%
1970	33,166		10.4%
1980	33,358		0.6%
1990	30,274		−9.2%
2000	31,549		4.2%
2010	32,061		1.6%
2020	31,040		−3.2%
2025 (est.)	30,315	▼	−2.3%
U.S. Decennial Census; 1850–2010 2010 2020

=== Racial and ethnic composition ===
Kleberg County, Texas– Racial and ethnic composition Note: the US Census treats Hispanic/Latino as an ethnic category. This table excludes Latinos from the racial categories and assigns them to a separate category. Hispanics/Latinos may be of any race.
Race / Ethnicity (NH = Non-Hispanic)	Pop 1980	Pop 1990	Pop 2000	Pop 2010	Pop 2020	% 1980	% 1990	% 2000	% 2010	% 2020
White alone (NH)	13,876	10,279	8,997	7,479	6,728	41.60%	33.95%	28.52%	23.33%	21.68%
Black or African American alone (NH)	1,260	955	1,091	1,070	995	3.78%	3.15%	3.46%	3.34%	3.21%
Native American or Alaska Native alone (NH)	73	49	97	51	83	0.22%	0.16%	0.31%	0.16%	0.27%
Asian alone (NH)	469	381	444	715	784	1.41%	1.26%	1.41%	2.23%	2.53%
Native Hawaiian or Pacific Islander alone (NH)	x	x	26	26	1	x	x	0.08%	0.08%	0.00%
Other race alone (NH)	272	81	21	28	97	0.82%	0.27%	0.07%	0.09%	0.31%
Mixed race or Multiracial (NH)	x	x	238	197	432	x	x	0.75%	0.61%	1.39%
Hispanic or Latino (any race)	17,408	18,529	20,635	22,495	21,920	52.19%	61.20%	65.41%	70.16%	70.62%
Total	33,358	30,274	31,549	32,061	31,040	100.00%	100.00%	100.00%	100.00%	100.00%

=== 2020 census ===
As of the 2020 census, the county had a population of 31,040 and a median age of 32.2 years; 23.4% of residents were under the age of 18 and 14.5% were 65 years of age or older. For every 100 females there were 101.3 males, and for every 100 females age 18 and over there were 99.9 males.

The racial makeup of the county was 55.6% White, 3.6% Black or African American, 0.8% American Indian and Alaska Native, 2.6% Asian, <0.1% Native Hawaiian and Pacific Islander, 12.0% from some other race, and 25.4% from two or more races. Hispanic or Latino residents of any race comprised 70.6% of the population.

80.4% of residents lived in urban areas, while 19.6% lived in rural areas.

There were 11,530 households in the county, of which 32.3% had children under the age of 18 living in them. Of all households, 40.1% were married-couple households, 24.2% were households with a male householder and no spouse or partner present, and 28.6% were households with a female householder and no spouse or partner present. About 28.0% of all households were made up of individuals and 9.4% had someone living alone who was 65 years of age or older.

There were 13,948 housing units, of which 17.3% were vacant. Among occupied housing units, 53.5% were owner-occupied and 46.5% were renter-occupied. The homeowner vacancy rate was 1.8% and the rental vacancy rate was 17.2%.

=== 2000 Census ===
As of the census of 2000, there were 31,549 people, 10,896 households, and 7,681 families residing in the county. The population density was 36 people per square mile (14 people/km^{2}). There were 12,743 housing units at an average density of 15 units per square mile (5.8/km^{2}). The racial makeup of the county was 71.87% White, 3.70% Black or African American, 0.61% Native American, 1.47% Asian, 0.10% Pacific Islander, 19.00% from other races, and 3.25% from two or more races. 65.41% of the population were Hispanic or Latino of any race.

There were 10,896 households, out of which 34.90% had children under the age of 18 living with them, 52.10% were married couples living together, 13.90% had a female householder with no husband present, and 29.50% were non-families. 22.30% of all households were made up of individuals, and 7.60% had someone living alone who was 65 years of age or older. The average household size was 2.78 and the average family size was 3.30.

In the county, the population was spread out, with 27.30% under the age of 18, 15.70% from 18 to 24, 27.40% from 25 to 44, 19.00% from 45 to 64, and 10.60% who were 65 years of age or older. The median age was 29 years. For every 100 females, there were 101.00 males. For every 100 females age 18 and over, there were 98.50 males.

The median income for a household in the county was $29,313, and the median income for a family was $33,055. Males had a median income of $31,179 versus $19,494 for females. The per capita income for the county was $13,542. About 21.20% of families and 26.70% of the population were below the poverty line, including 35.50% of those under age 18 and 15.60% of those age 65 or over.

=== Religion ===
68.1% of the people in Kleberg County are religious: 37.3% are Catholics, 9.8% are Baptists, 8% are Muslims, 3.3% are Methodists, 2.7% are Pentecostals, 2.0% are Mormons, 0.9% are Lutherans, 0.7% are Presbyterians, 0.6% are Episcopalians and 2.8% are from another Christian faith.

== Communities ==
=== Cities and towns ===
- Corpus Christi (also in Aransas, Nueces, and San Patricio counties)
- Kingsville (county seat)

=== Census-designated places ===
- Ricardo
- Riviera

=== Unincorporated community ===
- Loyola Beach

== Politics ==
United States presidential election results for Kleberg County, Texas
Year	Republican		Democratic		Third party(ies)	
Year	No.	%	No.	%	No.	%
1916	106	18.34%	427	73.88%	45	7.79%
1920	172	25.56%	455	67.61%	46	6.84%
1924	226	19.57%	721	62.42%	208	18.01%
1928	751	51.94%	695	48.06%	0	0.00%
1932	198	10.15%	1,727	88.56%	25	1.28%
1936	156	9.13%	1,488	87.12%	64	3.75%
1940	429	20.78%	1,631	79.02%	4	0.19%
1944	421	21.51%	1,473	75.27%	63	3.22%
1948	697	24.26%	2,083	72.50%	93	3.24%
1952	2,037	38.94%	3,193	61.04%	1	0.02%
1956	2,121	46.39%	2,436	53.28%	15	0.33%
1960	2,092	35.66%	3,773	64.32%	1	0.02%
1964	1,652	26.52%	4,568	73.32%	10	0.16%
1968	2,713	33.84%	4,633	57.80%	670	8.36%
1972	5,312	54.19%	4,481	45.71%	10	0.10%
1976	3,771	39.09%	5,803	60.15%	73	0.76%
1980	4,608	45.84%	5,125	50.98%	320	3.18%
1984	5,712	53.48%	4,924	46.10%	45	0.42%
1988	4,443	44.67%	5,367	53.96%	136	1.37%
1992	3,897	36.89%	5,109	48.36%	1,558	14.75%
1996	3,391	37.68%	5,136	57.07%	472	5.25%
2000	4,526	49.23%	4,481	48.74%	187	2.03%
2004	5,366	53.81%	4,550	45.62%	57	0.57%
2008	4,540	45.97%	5,256	53.22%	80	0.81%
2012	4,058	45.56%	4,754	53.37%	95	1.07%
2016	4,367	45.55%	4,716	49.19%	504	5.26%
2020	5,575	50.24%	5,381	48.49%	141	1.27%
2024	5,612	56.04%	4,338	43.32%	64	0.64%

United States Senate election results for Kleberg County, Texas1
Year	Republican		Democratic		Third party(ies)	
Year	No.	%	No.	%	No.	%
2024	5,047	51.02%	4,614	46.64%	232	2.35%

United States Senate election results for Kleberg County, Texas2
Year	Republican		Democratic		Third party(ies)	
Year	No.	%	No.	%	No.	%
2020	5,374	50.19%	5,067	47.32%	267	2.49%

Texas Gubernatorial election results for Kleberg County
Year	Republican		Democratic		Third party(ies)	
Year	No.	%	No.	%	No.	%
2022	4,074	53.40%	3,463	45.39%	92	1.21%

Kleberg County is represented in the Texas House of Representatives by José Manuel Lozano, a Republican party politician. Kleberg County has leaned Democratic most of its history but has become more competitive in the 21st century. An indicator of that trend is Lozano, who was originally a Democrat but switched to the Republican party in 2012. Kleberg County Attorney Kira Talip Sanchez was originally elected as a Democrat in 2014 but switched parties in August 2023 and is now a Republican. No candidate from either party has managed to reach 60% of the vote share in a presidential election since Jimmy Carter in 1976.

Compared to the rest of the ancestral Democratic stronghold of South Texas, Kleberg County has seen a relatively mild swing towards the Democrats - for example, in 2024, the county voted to the left of nearby Starr County for the first time in its history. Some of this may be attributed to Kleberg County's lower Hispanic population, especially in rural areas.

== Education ==
School districts in the county include:

- Kingsville Independent School District
- Ricardo Independent School District
- Riviera Independent School District
- Santa Gertrudis Independent School District

Coastal Bend College (formerly Bee County College) is the designated community college for the Kingsville, Ricardo, and Santa Gertrudis school district areas. The Riviera ISD portion is in the Del Mar College-Corpus Christi Junior College District.

== See also ==
- List of museums in the Texas Gulf Coast
- National Register of Historic Places listings in Kleberg County, Texas
- Recorded Texas Historic Landmarks in Kleberg County
