= Ricardo Independent School District =

School district in Texas, United States

Address
- 138 County Road 2160 W Kingsville, Texas, 78363; United States

District information
- Grades: PK–8
- Schools: 2
- NCES District ID: 4836930

Students and staff
- Students: 657 (2023–2024)
- Teachers: 45.87 (on an FTE basis)
- Student–teacher ratio: 14.32:1

Other information
- Website: www.ricardoisd.us

Ricardo Independent School District is a public school district in Kleberg County, Texas, United States.

The district has two campuses - Ricardo Middle (Grades 5-8) and Ricardo Elementary (Grades PK-4).

Ricardo ISD includes a small portion of southern Kingsville.

In 2009, the school district was rated "recognized" by the Texas Education Agency.

High school students move on to Kaufer Early College High School, which is operated by Riviera Independent School District.
