= Riviera, Texas =

- Census-designated place
- Location within Texas Location within the United States
- Coordinates: 27°17′55″N 97°48′54″W
- Country: United States
- State: Texas
- County: Kleberg

Area
  - Total: 3.70 sq mi (9.59 km^{2})
  - Land: 3.69 sq mi (9.55 km^{2})
  - Water: 0.015 sq mi (0.04 km^{2})
- Elevation: 37 ft (11 m)

Population (2022)
  - Total: 758
  - Density: 187/sq mi (72.1/km^{2})
- Time zone: CST
  - Summer (DST): CDT
- ZIP code: 78379
- Area code: 361
- FIPS code: 48-62468
- GNIS feature ID: 1345283

Riviera is a census-designated place in Kleberg County, Texas, United States. As of the 2022 census, it had a population of 758. It is located 15 miles (24 km) south of Kingsville on U.S. Route 77 (Future Interstate 69E) and 22 miles (35 km) northeast of Falfurrias on Texas State Highway 285.

== History ==
Riviera was founded in 1906 by Theodore Fredrick Koch, a land promoter. He purchased land from the King Ranch to sell to landseekers. He built a townsite along the St. Louis, Brownsville and Mexico Railway and named it after the French Riviera. Koch ran a train from Chicago to Riviera twice a month to bring more people to the area. Riviera witnessed growth in its first few years, but a drought hit the area in 1915 and then a terrible hurricane hit the area in 1916. When U.S. Highway 77 was constructed, it helped the economy get back on its feet. Now its economy depends on farming. It is also the last stop for about 60 miles (97 km) to Raymondville, going south, so its gas stations and restaurants are used by many travelers heading in that direction.

== Dick Cheney hunting accident ==
The town of Riviera gained notability on February 11, 2006, when, while participating in a quail hunt, then-Vice President Dick Cheney accidentally shot Harry Whittington with a 28-gauge Perazzi shotgun on a private ranch near Riviera. Whittington suffered non-fatal injuries to the face, neck, and chest, a collapsed lung, as well as a non-fatal heart attack and atrial fibrillation on February 14. Whittington died in 2023, from unrelated complications.

== Education ==
Riviera is served by Riviera Independent School District.

- Grades: 9-12 Kaufer High School
- Grades: PK–5 Nanny Elementary School
- Grades: 6-8 De la Paz Middle School

Under Texas law, people in Riviera ISD are zoned to Del Mar College.

== Demographics ==
Historical population
Census	Pop.	Note	%±
2010	689		—
2020	609		−11.6%
U.S. Decennial Census; 1850–1900 1910; 1920 1930 1940; 1950 1960 1970; 1980 1990 2000; 2010 2020

Riviera first appeared as a census designated place in the 2010 U.S. census.

Riviera CDP, Texas – Racial and ethnic composition Note: the US Census treats Hispanic/Latino as an ethnic category. This table excludes Latinos from the racial categories and assigns them to a separate category. Hispanics/Latinos may be of any race.
Race / Ethnicity (NH = Non-Hispanic)	Pop 2010	Pop 2020	% 2010	% 2020
White alone (NH)	180	161	26.12%	26.44%
Black or African American alone (NH)	1	7	0.15%	1.15%
Native American or Alaska Native alone (NH)	0	2	0.00%	0.33%
Asian alone (NH)	1	4	0.15%	0.66%
Native Hawaiian or Pacific Islander alone (NH)	0	0	0.00%	0.00%
Other race alone (NH)	1	1	0.15%	0.16%
Mixed race or Multiracial (NH)	0	4	0.00%	0.66%
Hispanic or Latino (any race)	506	430	73.44%	70.61%
Total	689	609	100.00%	100.00%

== See also ==
- Kingsville micropolitan area
