= Kleberg =

Kleberg can refer to:

Places:

- Kleberg County, Texas
- Kleberg, Dallas, Texas

People (family name)

- Louis Kleberg
- Richard M. Kleberg
- Rudolph Kleberg
- Robert J. Kleberg (Soldier)
- Robert J. Kleberg (King Ranch)
- Rosa von Roeder Kleberg
