= Robert Kleberg =

Robert Kleberg may refer to:

- Robert J. Kleberg (1803–1888), German immigrant who fought in the Battle of San Jacinto
- Robert J. Kleberg Jr. (1853–1932), Texas rancher
- Robert J. Kleberg III (1896– 1974), American rancher and horse breeder
