= Robert J. Kleberg III =

American rancher and horse breeder (1896–1974)

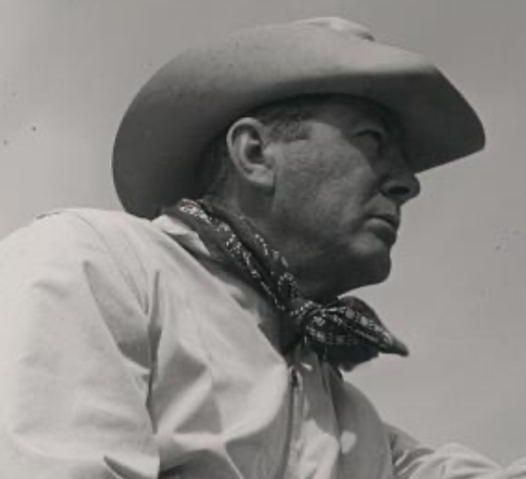
- 1944 portrait of Kleberg by Toni Frissell
- Born: Robert Justus Kleberg III; March 29, 1896; Corpus Christi, Texas, US
- Died: October 13, 1974 (aged 78); Houston, Texas, US
- Other name: Robert J. Kleberg Jr.
- Education: University of Wisconsin–Madison; Texas A&M University
- Occupations: Rancher, horse breeder
- Children: Helen Kleberg Groves
- Father: Robert J. Kleberg Jr.

Robert "Mr. Bob" Justus Kleberg III (March 29, 1896 – October 13, 1974) was an American rancher and horse breeder who managed the King Ranch, where the Santa Gertrudis breed of cattle was developed in the early twentieth century.

== Early life and education ==
Kleberg was born on March 29, 1896, in Corpus Christi, Texas, to rancher Robert J. Kleberg Jr. and his wife Alice Gertrude (née King). A member of the Kleberg family, his grandparents included pioneers Robert J. Kleberg and Rosa von Roeder Kleberg (paternal) and rancher Richard King (maternal), and his brother was politician Richard M. Kleberg. He was officially named Robert Justus Kleberg III, although he was commonly referred to as Robert J. Kleberg Jr., as his father was not commonly referred to with the junior suffix.

Kleberg completed undergraduate science work at University of Wisconsin–Madison, leaving in 1916. In 1967, he received an honorary degree from the university, which followed an honorary agricultural science degree from Texas A&M University in 1941.

== Career ==
Kleberg began ranching in 1916, at his father's King Ranch. He succeeded his father as ranch manager in 1932, following his death, and in 1935, became president of King Ranch when it began operating as a family corporation.

As manager, he expanded the land ownership of the company from 1.8 million acres to 15 million acres, which included land in the states of Florida, Kentucky, and Pennsylvania, as well as the countries of Argentina, Australia, Brazil, Morocco, Spain, and Venezuela; he also owned land in Cuba, which was seized after the communist government took power in 1960. The land expansions of Kleberg made King Ranch the largest citrus grower in the United States, due to 36,000 acres of citrus groves in Florida, as well as one of the ten largest sugarcane grower in the United States. He also continued his father's effort to expand King Ranch's land usage beyond agriculture, with him creating an oil lease with Humble Oil, which was the largest one ever issued for private land. He also headed King Ranch's transition into leasing its land for hunting. Besides ranching, he had a footing in banking, lumber, and newspapers.

Between 1918 and 1940 the ranch developed the Santa Gertrudis breed of cattle by cross-breeding cattle of mostly Indian (zebuine) breeding with European (taurine) Shorthorn stock. He is credited with having invented the cattle prod around 1930, though other versions date to 1917. He also invented the root plow and bred grazing grass, as well as helping to stop the spread of babesiosis. In 1947, he appeared on the cover of Time.

Kleberg also bred Quarter Horse and Thoroughbred racehorses. Trained by William J. Hirsch, his horses including Assault, Middleground, and Bold Venture. He also purchased Canonero II for $1,000,000.

== Personal life and death ==
On March 2, 1926, he married Helen Campbell (died 1963), having one daughter together. In his later life, Kleberg lived near Kingsville, Texas. He died on October 13, 1974, aged 78, in Baylor St. Luke's Medical Center, in Houston, of stomach cancer. His funeral was held on October 17, and he was buried on King Ranch. His daughter, Helen Kleberg Groves, went on to become a horsewoman and cattle rancher. He also raised his nephews B. K. Kleberg Johnson and Bobby Shelton after the deaths of their parents; both went on to become ranchers.

Politically, he was an 'individualist of formidable proportions', as Alden Whitman described him in his obituary. He considered himself conservative and was a registered Democrat who supported Barry Goldwater's 1964 presidential compaign, but also had connections to Lyndon B. Johnson.

In 1986, Kleberg was inducted into the American Quarter Horse Hall of Fame.

In 1995, Bob Kleberg and the King Ranch: A Worldwide Sea of Grass, a memoir written by his assistant, John Cypher, was published.
