= KLOT =

KLOT may refer to:

- Lewis University Airport (ICAO code KLOT)
- KLOT-LP, a low-power radio station (107.7 FM) licensed to serve Cat Spring, Texas, United States
