= Marcellus Kleberg =

American attorney and politician (1849–1913)

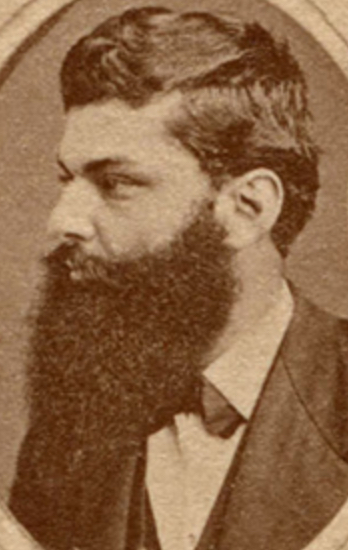

Member of the Texas House of Representatives
- In office 1872–?

Personal details
- Born: Marcellus Eugene Kleberg; February 7, 1849 Meyersville, Texas, US
- Died: March 1, 1913 (aged 64)
- Children: 6
- Parent(s): Robert J. Kleberg (father); Rosalie von Roeder (mother)
- Education: Concrete College; Washington University School of Law; Lee University

Marcellus Eugene Kleberg (February 7, 1849 – March 1, 1913) was an American attorney and politician.

== Biography ==
Kleberg was born on February 7, 1849, in Meyersville, Texas, to pioneer Robert J. Kleberg and Rosalie von Roeder. His brothers included rancher Robert J. Kleberg Jr. and politician Rudolph Kleberg. He studied at Concrete College, the Washington University School of Law and Lee University; he graduated from Washington, as well as Lee in 1872. He practiced law in DeWitt County, Texas until 1873, when he was elected to the Texas House of Representatives in the 13th Texas Legislature. In 1875, he and B. T. Harris partnered and practiced in Bellville. Also in 1875, he moved to practice in Galveston, where he served in multiple of the city's municipal offices. In 1912, he served as a delegate of the National Bar Association. He was also appointed by S. W. T. Lanham as a regent of the University of Texas. Kleberg married Emilie Miller on October 24, 1875, having six children together. He died on March 1, 1913, aged 64.
