= Helen Kleberg Groves =

Texas horsewoman and cattle rancher (1927–2022)

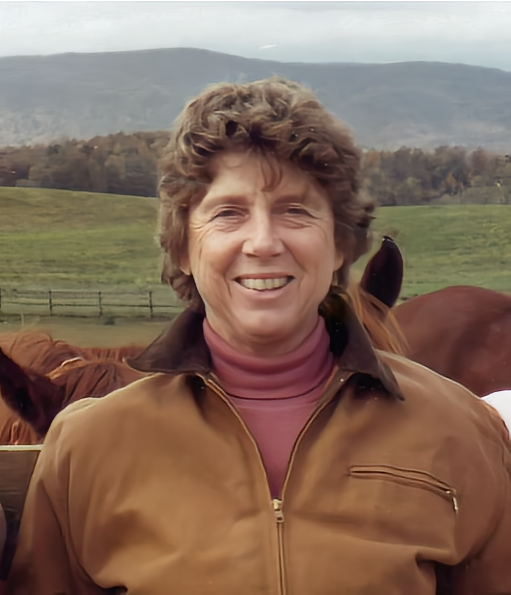
- Groves at her ranch in 1984
- Born: Helen King Kleberg; October 20, 1927; Kingsville, Texas, U.S.
- Died: May 6, 2022 (aged 94); San Antonio, Texas, U.S.
- Other names: Helenita
- Occupation: Rancher
- Known for: "First Lady of Cutting", inducted into the National Cowgirl Museum and Hall of Fame (1988), a horsewoman, rancher, cattle raiser, breeder of Quarter Horses, Thoroughbred Horses, and Santa Gertrudis cattle

Helen Kleberg Groves (October 20, 1927 – May 6, 2022) was a horsewoman and cattle rancher dubbed the "First Lady of Cutting" by the San Antonio Express-News and inducted in 1988 into the National Cowgirl Museum and Hall of Fame. She was born in San Antonio, Texas, and raised in Kingsville, Texas, on the King Ranch, founded by her great-grandfather, Richard King. In 1946, she led the King Ranch's Thoroughbred racehorse, Assault, into the winner's circle after his Triple Crown victory in the Preakness. Groves attended all three of his Triple Crown races. Assault was, and still is, the only Texas-bred winner of the Triple Crown.

Helen Kleberg was the only child of Robert J. Kleberg III and Helen Campbell Kleberg. Robert Kleberg Jr. was the son of Robert Kleberg and Alice King-Kleberg, who was the daughter of Henrietta and Richard King, founder of the King Ranch. Her father developed the Santa Gertrudis breed of cattle. The role played by Elizabeth Taylor in the movie Giant was modeled after her mother. In 1950, the Klebergs established a private foundation under the name "Robert J. Kleberg, Jr. and Helen Campbell Kleberg Foundation", which has awarded grants to scientific research, as well as to wildlife and habitat stewardship projects.

Helen was raised on the King Ranch which was headquartered in Kingsville, Texas. She attended Vassar College.

Helen's first husband was John Deaver Alexander MD, with whom she had six children. After her first husband's death, she remarried. Her second husband was Lloyd J. Groves.
