= John J. Bell =

American politician (1910–1963)

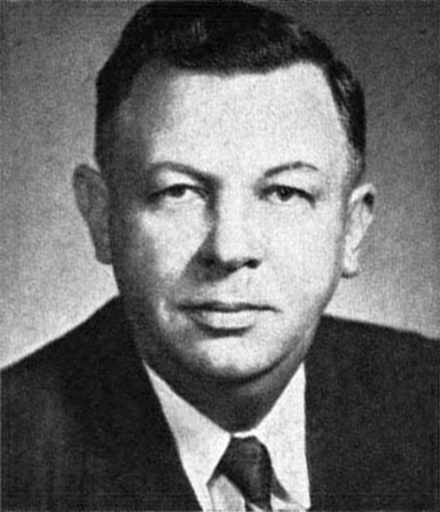

Member of the U.S. House of Representatives from Texas's 14th district
- In office January 3, 1955 – January 3, 1957
- Preceded by: John E. Lyle Jr.
- Succeeded by: John Andrew Young

Member of the Texas Senate
- In office 1947–1954

Personal details
- Born: John Junior Bell; May 15, 1910 Cuero, Texas, U.S.
- Died: January 24, 1963 (aged 52)
- Resting place: Hillside Cemetery
- Party: Democratic
- Education: University of Texas at Austin
- Profession: Politician, lawyer, rancher, farmer

John Junior Bell (May 15, 1910 – January 24, 1963) was an American politician who served as the U.S. representative from Texas's 14th congressional district from 1955 to 1957.

Born in Cuero, Texas, Bell attended the public schools and graduated from the University of Texas at Austin in 1932 and from its law school in 1936. He was admitted to the bar in 1936 and commenced the practice of law in Cuero, Texas. He served in the Texas State House of Representatives from 1937 to 1947. In his private life, he was president of a company operating compresses in Victoria, Shiner, Cuero, and Taft, Texas. During World War II, he served as a private in the United States Army from May 1944 to March 1945.

He served as member of the Texas Senate from 1947 to 1954, participating as a delegate to the Democratic National Conventions of 1948 and 1952.

Bell was elected as a Democrat to the eighty-fourth Congress (January 3, 1955 – January 3, 1957,) when he was one of the majority of the Texan delegation to decline to sign the 1956 Southern Manifesto opposing the desegregation of public schools ordered by the Supreme Court in Brown v. Board of Education. He was an unsuccessful candidate for renomination in 1956.

After his political service ended, he continued as a lawyer, rancher, and farmer in Cuero, Texas, until his death January 24, 1963. He was interred in Hillside Cemetery.

== Sources ==
- United States Congress. "John J. Bell (id: B000342)". Biographical Directory of the United States Congress.

U.S. House of Representatives
| Preceded by John E. Lyle Jr. | Member of the U.S. House of Representatives from Texas's 14th congressional district 1955–1957 | Succeeded by John Andrew Young |
