= Robert J. Kleberg Jr. =

American lawyer and rancher (1853–1932)

Robert J. Kleberg
- Born: December 5, 1853; DeWitt County, Texas, US
- Died: October 10, 1932 (aged 78)
- Education: University of Virginia
- Occupations: Lawyer, rancher
- Children: Richard M. Kleberg; Robert J. Kleberg III
- Parent(s): Robert J. Kleberg (father); Rosalie von Roeder (mother)

Robert Justus Kleberg Jr. (December 5, 1853 – October 10, 1932) was an American lawyer and rancher of King Ranch.

== Biography ==
Kleberg was born on December 5, 1853, in DeWitt County, Texas, to pioneer Robert J. Kleberg Sr. and Rosalie von Roeder. His brothers included politician Rudolph Kleberg and attorney Marcellus Kleberg. He attended private schools, and studied at the University of Virginia School of Law. An 1880 graduate, he first practiced in Cuero. He moved to Corpus Christi and represented rancher Richard King, the founder of King Ranch.

Following King's death, Kleberg and Henrietta King, King’s wife, managed King Ranch. As managers, they brought the first Herefords and Shorthorns to the ranch, expanded its territory from 600,000 acres to 1.8 million acres, and developed the land beyond ranching. Kleberg was a pioneer of the city of Kingsville, helping fund construction in the early 20th century. He was president of the Texas and Southwestern Cattle Raisers Association from March 1899 to March 1901.

In 1886, Kleberg married Alice Gertrude King, the daughter of Richard King. They had five children, including politician Richard M. Kleberg and rancher Robert J. Kleberg III. He died on October 10, 1932, aged 78, in the headquarters of King Ranch, in Kleberg County, Texas.
