= John Andrew Young =

American politician (1916–2002)

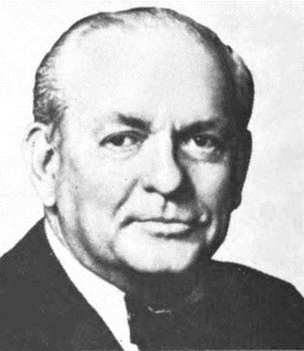

Member of the U.S. House of Representatives from Texas's 14th district
- In office January 3, 1957 – January 3, 1979
- Preceded by: John J. Bell
- Succeeded by: Joseph P. Wyatt Jr.

Personal details
- Born: November 10, 1916 Corpus Christi, Texas
- Died: January 22, 2002 (aged 85) Arlington, Virginia
- Party: Democratic
- Education: St. Edward's University (B.A.); University of Texas School of Law (LL.B.)
- Occupation: Attorney

Military service
- Allegiance: United States
- Branch/service: United States Navy
- Years of service: 1941–1945

John Andrew Young (November 10, 1916 – January 22, 2002) was a Democratic politician from Texas who served in the U.S. House of Representatives from 1957 to 1979.

Born in Corpus Christi, Texas, Young attended Incarnate Word Academy and Corpus Christi College-Academy. He earned his B.A. at St. Edward's University in 1937 and his L.L.B from the University of Texas School of Law in 1940. After starting his career as a lawyer, he served in the United States Navy from 1941 to 1945.

Young served as a lawyer for Nueces County, Texas in various positions, as assistant county attorney in 1946, assistant district attorney from 1947 to 1950, county attorney from 1951 to 1952 and county judge from 1953 to 1956. He ran successfully as a Democrat for the U.S. House of Representatives in 1956, defeating incumbent John J. Bell in the primary election and winning the general election. He took seat in 1957 and was reelected ten times. Young voted against the Civil Rights Acts of 1957, 1960, and 1964, but voted in favor the Voting Rights Act of 1965 and the Civil Rights Act of 1968. During his congressional service, Young's voting record was a mainly liberal one.

Young came under fire in 1976 when a former female member of his staff, Colleen Gardner, accused him of requiring her to have sex with him in order to keep her job. Young, who was married with five children at the time, denied the accusation and an investigation produced no evidence. His wife, Jane, committed suicide on July 13, 1977, by a gunshot to the head.

The scandal caused his defeat to Joseph P. Wyatt Jr. in the primary election in 1978 and he left office in 1979.

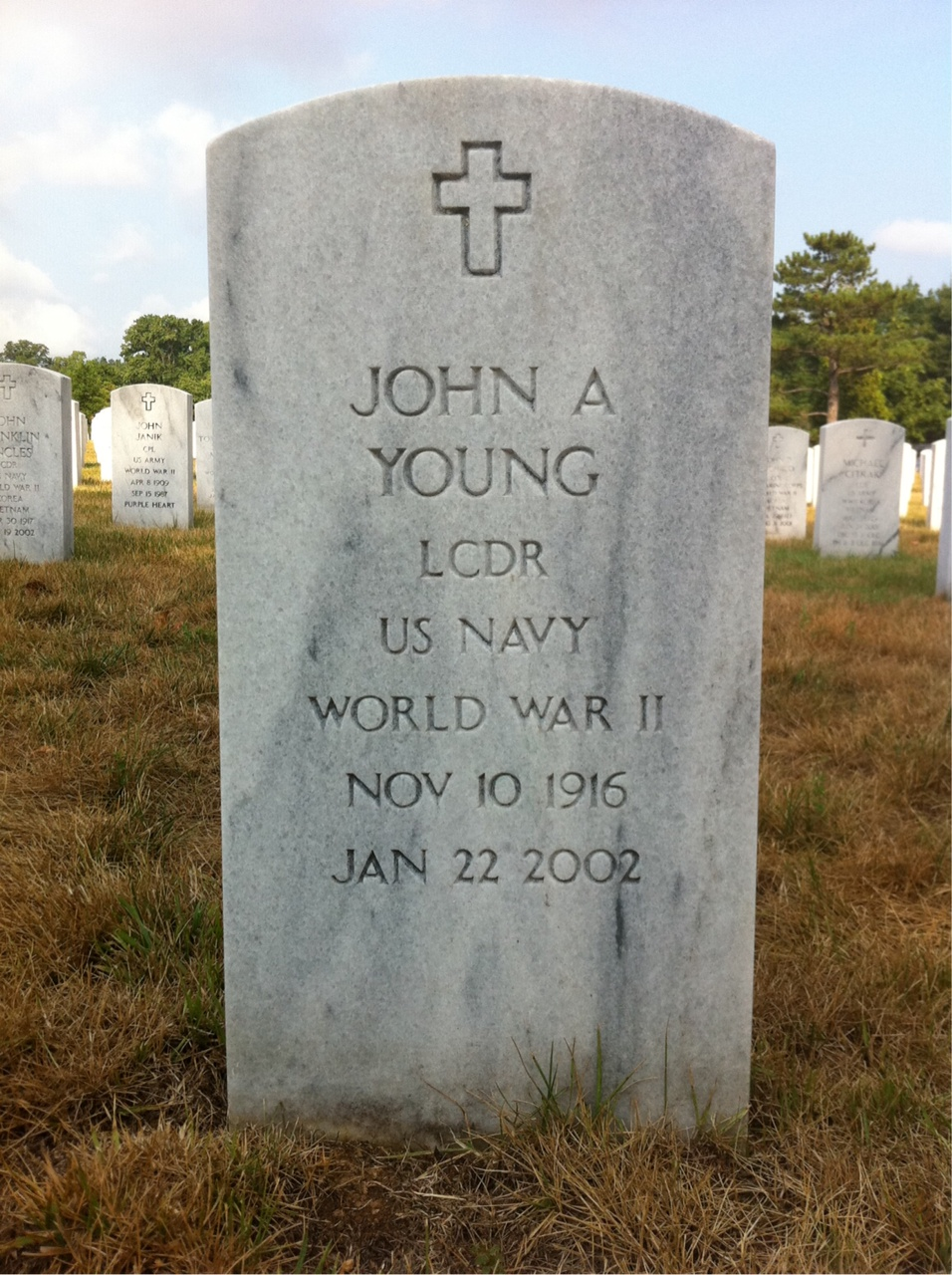
Grave of Young at Arlington National Cemetery

Afterwards, he worked as a consultant until his death on January 22, 2002. He was interred at Arlington National Cemetery in Arlington, Virginia.

== See also ==
- List of federal political sex scandals in the United States

U.S. House of Representatives
Preceded by John J. Bell	Member of the U.S. House of Representatives from Texas's 14th congressional district January 3, 1957 – January 3, 1979	Succeeded by Joseph P. Wyatt Jr.
