= Augustus McCloskey =

American politician

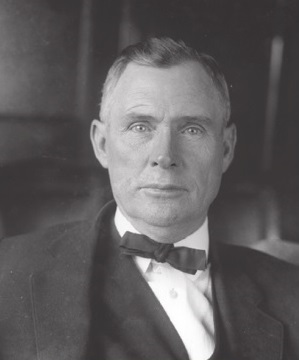
- U.S. House of Representatives collection, circa 1929

Member of the U.S. House of Representatives from Texas's 14th district
- In office March 4, 1929 – February 10, 1930
- Preceded by: Harry M. Wurzbach
- Succeeded by: Harry M. Wurzbach

Personal details
- Born: September 23, 1878 San Antonio, Texas
- Died: July 21, 1950 (aged 71) San Antonio, Texas
- Party: Democratic
- Occupation: Lawyer

Augustus McCloskey (September 23, 1878 – July 21, 1950) was an American politician who served as the U.S. representative from Texas's 14th congressional district from 1929 to 1930. He was a member of the Democratic Party.

Born in San Antonio, Texas, McCloskey attended Atascosa (Texas) School, St. Joseph's Academy, San Antonio, and St. Mary's College, San Antonio. He was employed as a stenographer 1903–1907. He studied law, was admitted to the bar in 1907, and commenced practice in San Antonio. He served as judge of Bexar County from 1920 to 1928, and as a delegate to the Democratic National Convention at Houston, in 1928.

McCloskey presented credentials as a Democratic Member-elect to the Seventy-first Congress and served from March 4, 1929, to February 10, 1930, when he was succeeded by Harry M. Wurzbach who successfully contested his election. Wurzbach had made allegations of gross fraud in Bexar County and when the House committee investigating that claim demanded to see the election records and to recount sundry ballots, McCloskey instead appeared before the committee and conceded stating that "I am satisfied that I was not elected and that Mr. Wurzbach was elected, and I am contending no further in this matter." Vote totals were revised and instead of winning by 319 votes, he was found to have lost by 61 votes.

He was not a candidate for renomination in 1930. He resumed the practice of law. He served as judge of the corporation court of San Antonio, from January 1943 to July 1947. He practiced law until his death in San Antonio on July 21, 1950. He was interred in San Fernando Cemetery.

== Sources ==
- United States Congress. "Augustus McCloskey (id: M000341)". Biographical Directory of the United States Congress.

U.S. House of Representatives
Preceded by Harry M. Wurzbach	Member of the U.S. House of Representatives from Texas's 14th congressional district March 4, 1929 – February 10, 1930	Succeeded by Harry M. Wurzbach
