= Cat Spring, Texas =

Cat Spring
- Unincorporated community
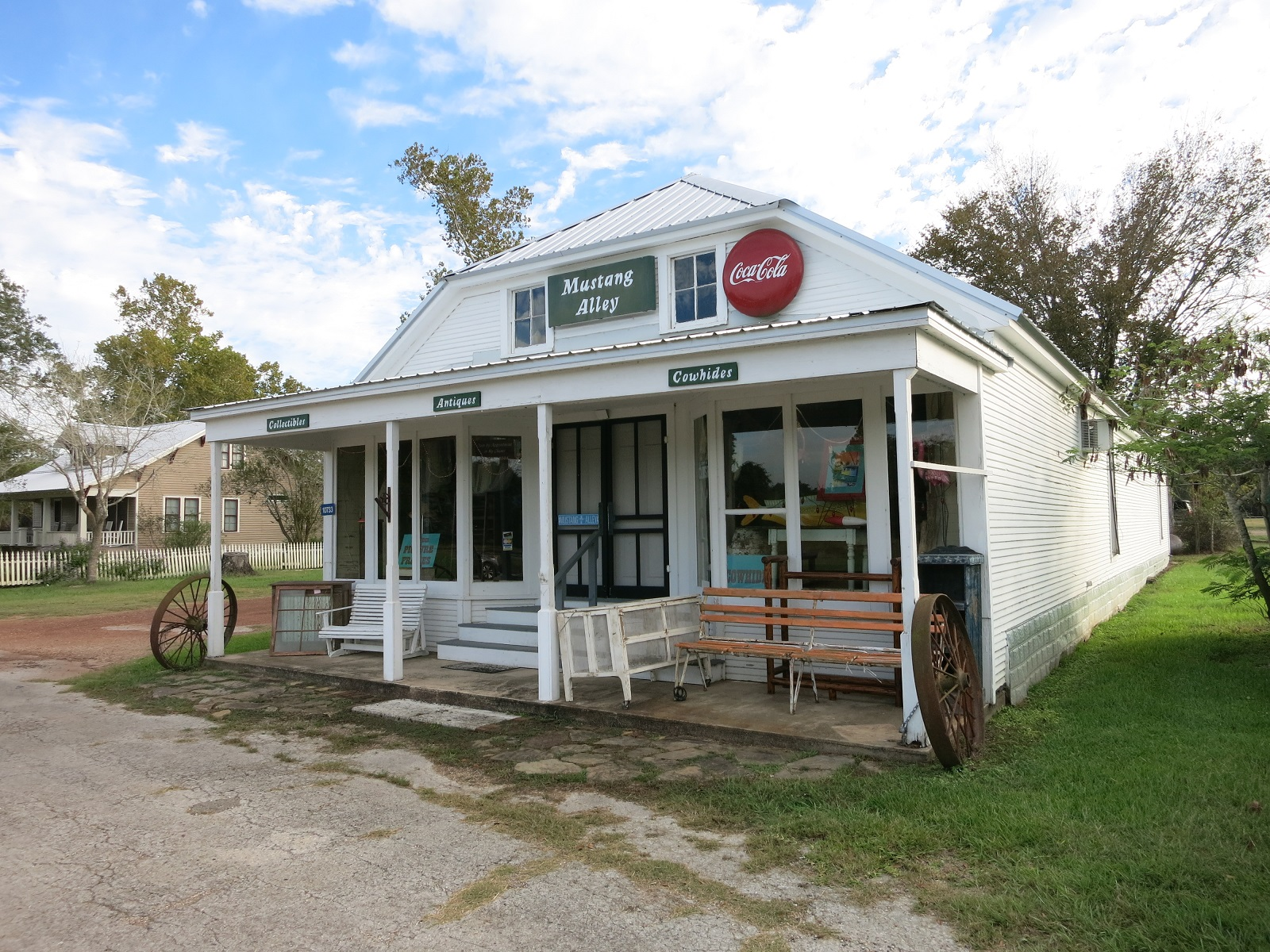
- The Mustang Alley Antiques Store in Cat Spring

- Location within the state of Texas Cat Spring (the United States)
- Coordinates: 29°50′44″N 96°19′33″W
- Country: United States
- State: Texas
- County: Austin
- Elevation: 308 ft (94 m)
- Time zone: UTC-6 (Central (CST))
  - Summer (DST): UTC-5 (CDT)
- ZIP codes: 78933
- GNIS feature ID: 1332320

Cat Spring is an unincorporated community in southern Austin County, Texas, United States. According to the Handbook of Texas, it had a population of 76 in 2000. Cat Spring was one of the first German/American settlements in Texas, and the location of Texas' first agricultural society.

== History ==
Cat Spring was founded by immigrants from Oldenburg and Westphalia that was led by Ludwig Anton Siegmund von Roeder and Robert J. Kleberg in 1834, in which many of them were attracted to the area and the state by letters sent from Friedrich Ernst after he bought a plot of land in the Mill Creek Valley in 1831 and named for a nearby spring near the San Bernard River where a puma was killed by one of the German immigrants. The first Protestant church was organized in the community sometime between 1840-and 1844 by Louis C. Ervendberg. The community was the location of Texas' first agricultural society (Cat Spring Agricultural Society) in 1856. A post office was established at Cat Spring in 1878. It was the site of a station on the Missouri-Kansas-Texas Railroad that linked it to New Ulm to the west and Sealy to the east, established in the 1890s. Its population was reported as 350 in 1836 and had 15 businesses. The community began to decline after World War II, in which its population decreased to 200 with 9 businesses in 1950, had 76 residents and only two businesses in 1990, and grew to 13 businesses in 2000 with the same population.

Today, the community has 75 residents and has a store at the crossroads a mile north of the community, the post office, and a "tractor graveyard". Another building located just west of the crossroads is one of the few remaining buildings in the community and is used as a dance hall. It is currently used for seasonal antique shows.

Although Cat Spring is unincorporated, it has a post office, with the ZIP code of 78933.

== Geography ==
Cat Spring lies along FM 949 and 2187 on the Missouri-Kansas-Texas Railroad and the west bank of the San Bernard River in western Austin County, 10 mi (16 km) south of the city of Bellville, the county seat. It is also located 29 mi (47 km) south of Brenham, 13 mi (21 km) west of Sealy, 15 mi (24 km) northeast of Columbus and 40 mi (64 km) northeast of La Grange.

== Radio stations ==
- KLOT-LP, part of 107.7 FM.

== Education ==
Cat Spring is served by the Sealy Independent School District.

== Notable person ==
- Rudolph Kleberg, U.S. Representative of Texas

== Gallery ==
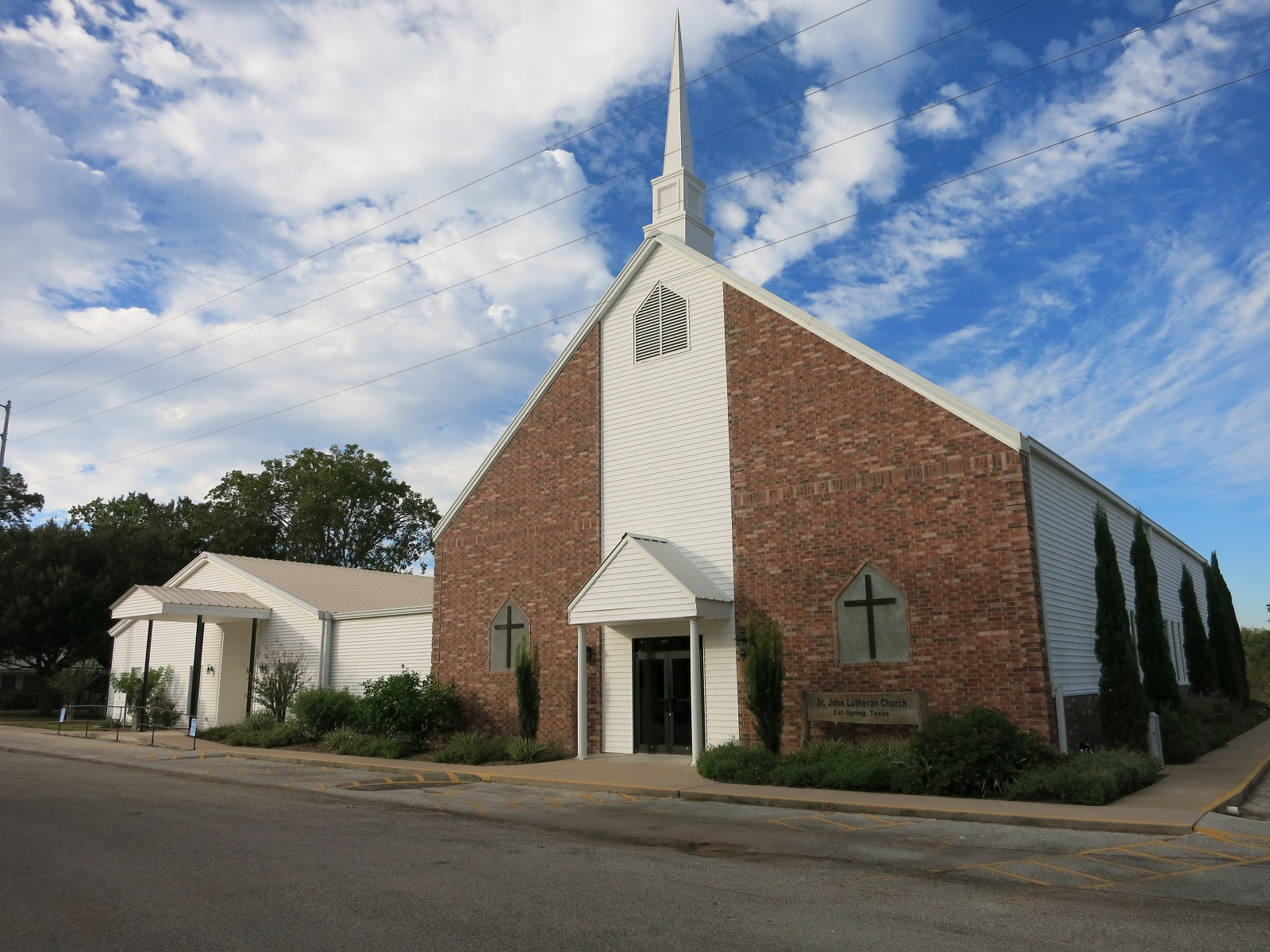
St. John Lutheran Church at 480 Ross Street

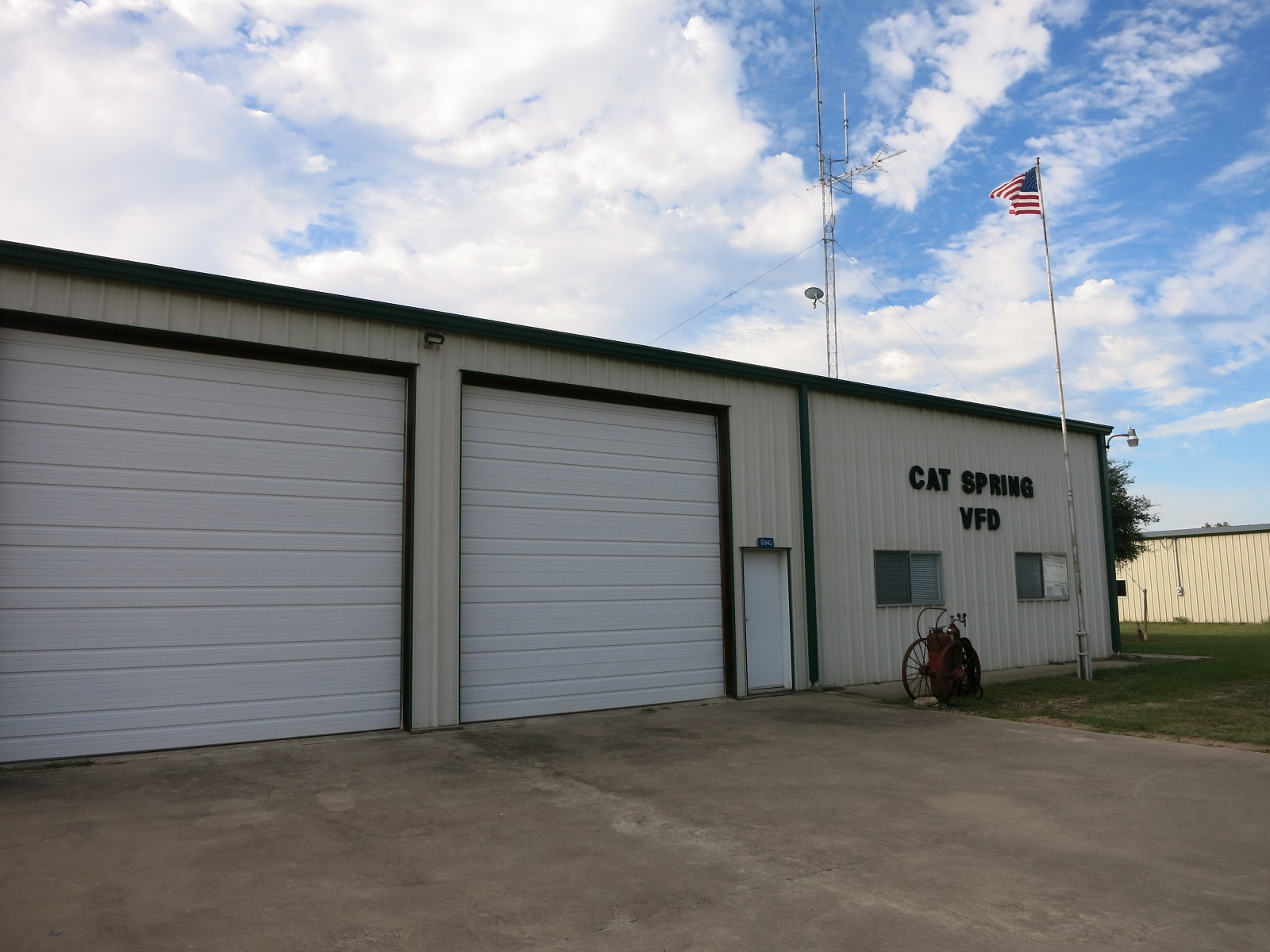
Cat Spring Volunteer Fire Department on FM 949

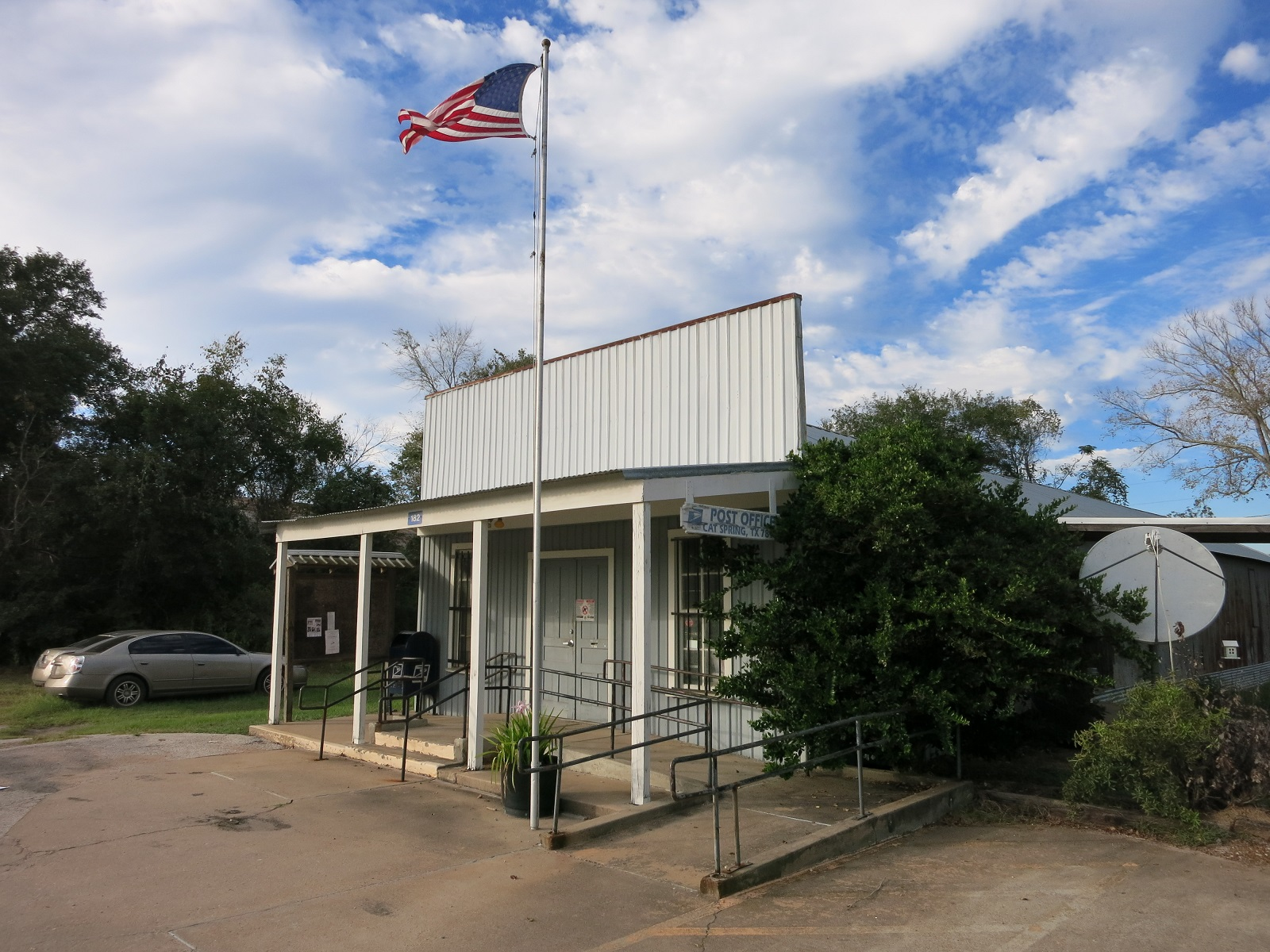
US Post Office on Front Street, north of the railroad
