= United States v. Wurzbach =

- Supreme Court of the United States

Argued January 20, 1930 Decided February 24, 1930
- Full case name: United States v. Harry M. Wurzbach
- Citations: 280 U.S. 396 (more) 50 S.Ct. 167; 74 L. Ed. 508; 1930 U.S. LEXIS 758

Case history
- Prior: 31 F.2d 774 (W.D. Tex. 1929)

Holding
- The sixth section of the act of August 15, 1876, is not unconstitutional

Court membership
- Chief Justice Charles E. Hughes Associate Justices Oliver W. Holmes Jr. · Willis Van Devanter; James C. McReynolds · Louis Brandeis; George Sutherland · Pierce Butler; Edward T. Sanford · Harlan F. Stone

Case opinion
- Majority: Holmes, joined by unanimous

United States v. Wurzbach, 280 U.S. 396 (1930), is a unanimous ruling by the US Supreme Court that the term "political purpose," as used in the Federal Corrupt Practices Act, was not impermissibly vague. The Supreme Court reversed the district court, which had quashed an indictment under the Act.

== Background ==
Harry M. Wurzbach, a member of the US House of Representatives from Texas, was indicted under the Federal Corrupt Practices Act for receiving money from employees of the US government. The District Court of the United States for the Western District of Texas had thrown out the indictment on two grounds:

- The term "political purpose" did not include the behavior in question.
- If the term includes such behavior, the Act was unconstitutional.

== Decision ==
Associate Justice Oliver Wendell Holmes Jr. delivered the unanimous opinion of the Court, which contains just 752 words.

Holmes dismissed almost out of hand the district court's lengthy discussion of the terms and structure of the Act: "This language is perfectly intelligible and clearly embraces the acts charged." The district court had concluded that Article 1, Section 4 of the Constitution permits Congress to regulate only the time, place, and manner of elections, and primary elections do not fall under federal control (as per Newberry v. United States). Holmes, however, argued that the ability to restrict receipt of funds was not contingent upon when or where the funds were received (primary or general election). Holmes cited Ex parte Curtis.

The district court was reversed and the case remanded.
