= John E. Lyle Jr. =

American politician (1910–2003)

John Emmett Lyle Jr.
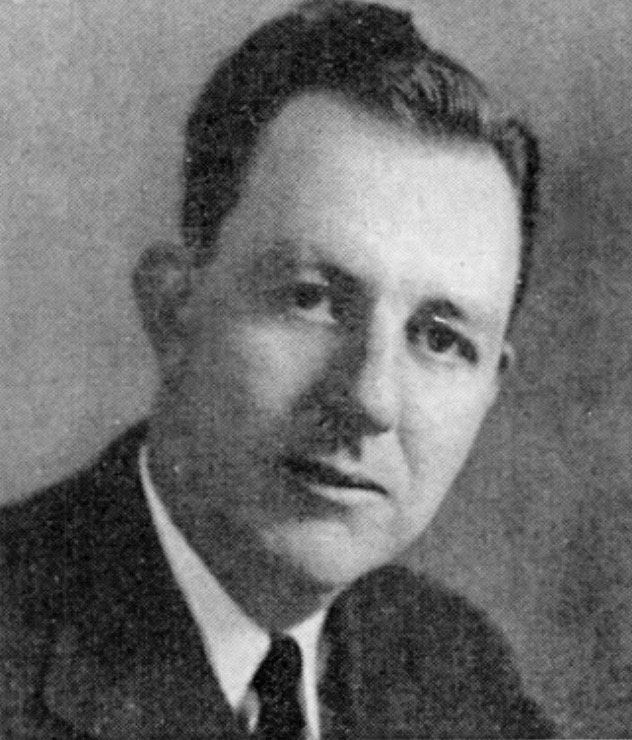

Member of the U.S. House of Representatives from Texas's 14th district
- In office January 3, 1945 – January 3, 1955
- Preceded by: Richard M. Kleberg
- Succeeded by: John J. Bell

Member of the Texas House of Representatives
- In office 1941–1944

Personal details
- Born: September 4, 1910 Boyd, Texas, US
- Died: November 11, 2003 (aged 93) Houston, Texas, US
- Resting place: Texas State Cemetery, Austin
- Party: Democratic Party
- Spouses: Gertrude Swanner (m. 1937): Nadine Lyle (m. c. 1955)
- Education: University of Texas; Houston Law School
- Profession: Lawyer
- Committees: House Post Office and Civil Service Committee
- Awards: Purple Heart

Military service
- Branch/service: United States Army
- Years of service: 1942–1944
- Rank: Captain (United States O-3)
- Battles/wars: Italian campaign; Anzio; Sicily; Malta

John Emmett Lyle Jr. (September 4, 1910 – November 11, 2003) was an American politician who served as the U.S. representative from Texas's 14th congressional district from 1945 to 1955.

== Early life ==
A third generation Texan born in Boyd, Texas, Lyle graduated from Wichita Falls High School, Wichita Falls, Texas. He attended the Junior College at Wichita Falls, the University of Texas (working as a night watchman in the Capitol basement), and the Houston Law School at night. He was admitted to the bar in 1934, and entered private practice in Corpus Christi.

== Political career ==
Lyle served as a member of the Texas House of Representatives from 1941 to 1944. He was in the United States Army from 1942 to 1944; when he won the Democratic primary for nomination for the United States House of Representatives in 1944, he was an active duty Captain of artillery in Italy.

He was elected as a Democrat to the Seventy-ninth and to the four succeeding Congresses (January 3, 1945 – January 3, 1955), enjoying strong support from the Parr family of Duval County. He was not a candidate for renomination to Congress in 1954.

He was a staunch anti-communist and was the chief witness against the two times Chairman of the Federal Power Commission, Leland Olds, when Olds was blocked by the Senate from reappointment largely on the grounds that Olds had previously been close to the Communist Party.

== Later life ==
Lyle was a director of Falcon Seaboard and of St. Luke's Episcopal Hospital in Houston, Texas. He was appointed to the Federal Council on Aging in 1994.

He died on November 11, 2003, in Houston and was interred in Texas State Cemetery, Austin, Texas.

== Sources ==
- United States Congress. "John E. Lyle Jr. (id: L000525)". Biographical Directory of the United States Congress.

U.S. House of Representatives
Preceded by Richard M. Kleberg	Member of the U.S. House of Representatives from Texas's 14th congressional district January 3, 1945 – January 3, 1955	Succeeded by John J. Bell
