= Texas's 14th congressional district =

U.S. House district for Texas

- Interactive map of district boundaries
- Representative: Randy Weber; R–Friendswood
- Distribution: 86.57% urban; 13.43% rural
- Population (2025): 787,142
- Median household income: $83,438
- Ethnicity: 52.7% White; 25.1% Hispanic; 15.3% Black; 3.2% Two or more races; 2.9% Asian; 0.7% other
- Cook PVI: R+17

Texas's 14th congressional district for the United States House of Representatives stretches from Freeport to Orange, Texas. It formerly covered the area south and southwest of the Greater Houston region, including Galveston, in the state of Texas.

The district was created as a result of the 1900 U.S. census and was first contested in 1902. The Galveston area had previously been included in Texas's 10th congressional district. Its first representative was the Democrat James L. Slayden, based in San Antonio, who had served the 12th congressional district since 1897 and was redistricted. He was elected from the new district and began representing the 14th in March 1903 as a member of the 58th United States Congress. He was repeatedly re-elected and served until 1919. He refused nomination in 1918.

Republican Harry M. Wurzbach carried this district in several elections, from 1920 to 1926, serving from 1921 to 1929. He successfully contested the election of 1928, taking his seat in 1930 for the remainder of the term, and was re-elected in 1930. The district during that era included the aberrant counties of Gillespie, Kendall, Comal and Guadalupe, whose German Americans had historically opposed slavery and became Texas' only consistent Republican Party voters during the "Solid South" era. In addition, Galveston was a major port of entry for immigrants, with many arriving from southern and eastern Europe. At that time, many found the Republican Party more welcoming than the dominant Democratic Party. In 1901, the Democratic-dominated legislature had passed a poll tax, which effectively had disfranchised most blacks and many poor whites and Latinos.

The district's ultimate shift to the Republican Party in the 1980s has been attributed to the coattail effect of Ronald Reagan's electoral successes. A few Democrats have won local and state elections in the 1990s. Former Republican and Libertarian Presidential candidate Ron Paul held congressional office from 1997 to 2013. The district's current representative is Republican Randy Weber.

== Recent election results from statewide races ==
=== 2023–2027 boundaries ===
Year	Office	Results
2008	President	McCain 60% - 39%
2012	President	Romney 64% - 36%
2014	Senate	Cornyn 67% - 33%
2014	Governor	Abbott 65% - 35%
2016	President	Trump 62% - 34%
2018	Senate	Cruz 63% - 37%
2018	Governor	Abbott 66% - 33%
2018	Lt. Governor	Patrick 62% - 36%
2018	Attorney General	Paxton 61% - 36%
2018	Comptroller of Public Accounts	Hegar 63% - 34%
2020	President	Trump 64% - 35%
2020	Senate	Cornyn 64% - 34%
2022	Governor	Abbott 66% - 32%
2022	Lt. Governor	Patrick 65% - 32%
2022	Attorney General	Paxton 65% - 32%
2022	Comptroller of Public Accounts	Hegar 67% - 31%
2024	President	Trump 66% - 32%
2024	Senate	Cruz 64% - 34%

=== 2027–2033 boundaries ===
Year	Office	Results
2008	President	McCain 60% - 39%
2012	President	Romney 64% - 36%
2014	Senate	Cornyn 67% - 33%
2014	Governor	Abbott 64% - 36%
2016	President	Trump 61% - 36%
2018	Senate	Cruz 60% - 40%
2018	Governor	Abbott 64% - 35%
2018	Lt. Governor	Patrick 60% - 38%
2018	Attorney General	Paxton 59% - 39%
2018	Comptroller of Public Accounts	Hegar 61% - 36%
2020	President	Trump 60% - 39%
2020	Senate	Cornyn 61% - 37%
2022	Governor	Abbott 62% - 37%
2022	Lt. Governor	Patrick 61% - 37%
2022	Attorney General	Paxton 61% - 37%
2022	Comptroller of Public Accounts	Hegar 63% - 35%
2024	President	Trump 62% - 37%
2024	Senate	Cruz 59% - 39%
2026	Senate	Paxton 49% - 48%
2026	Governor	Abbott 51% - 47%

== Current composition ==
For the 118th and successive Congresses (based on redistricting following the 2020 census), the district contains all or portions of the following counties and communities:

Brazoria County (22)

Alvin (part; also 22nd), Angleton, Bailey's Prairie, Brazoria, Bonney, Clute, Damon, Danbury, East Columbia, Freeport, Hillcrest, Holiday Lakes, Jones Creek, Lake Jackson, Liverpool, Oyster Creek, Quintana, Richwood, Surfside Beach, Sweeny, West Columbia, Wild Peach Village

Galveston County (16)

All 16 communities

Jefferson County (10)

Beaumont (part; also 36th), Beauxart Gardens, Central Gardens, Fannett, Groves, Hamshire, Nederland, Port Arthur (shared with Orange County), Port Neches, Taylor Landing

Orange County (11)

All 11 communities

== Future composition ==
Beginning with the 2026 election, the 14th district will consist of the following counties:

- Brazoria (part)
- Chambers (part)
- Fort Bend (part)
- Galveston
- Jefferson (part)
- Orange

== List of members representing the district ==
Member	Party	Years	Cong ress	Electoral history
District established March 4, 1903
James L. Slayden (San Antonio)	Democratic	March 4, 1903 – March 3, 1919	58th 59th 60th 61st 62nd 63rd 64th 65th	Redistricted from the 12th district and re-elected in 1902. Re-elected in 1904. Re-elected in 1906. Re-elected in 1908. Re-elected in 1910. Re-elected in 1912. Re-elected in 1914. Re-elected in 1916. Retired.
Carlos Bee (San Antonio)	Democratic	March 4, 1919 – March 3, 1921	66th	Elected in 1918. [data missing]
Harry M. Wurzbach (Seguin)	Republican	March 4, 1921 – March 3, 1929	67th 68th 69th 70th	Elected in 1920. Re-elected in 1922. Re-elected in 1924. Re-elected in 1926. Lost re-election.
Augustus McCloskey (San Antonio)	Democratic	March 4, 1929 – February 10, 1930	71st	Elected in 1928. Lost election challenge.
Harry M. Wurzbach (Seguin)	Republican	February 10, 1930 – November 6, 1931	71st 72nd	Successfully challenged McCloskey's election. Re-elected in 1930. Died.
Vacant		November 6, 1931 – November 24, 1931	72nd	
Richard M. Kleberg (Corpus Christi)	Democratic	November 24, 1931 – January 3, 1945	72nd 73rd 74th 75th 76th 77th 78th	Elected to finish Wurzbach's term. Re-elected in 1932. Re-elected in 1934. Re-elected in 1936. Re-elected in 1938. Re-elected in 1940. Re-elected in 1942. Lost renomination.
John E. Lyle Jr. (Corpus Christi)	Democratic	January 3, 1945 – January 3, 1955	79th 80th 81st 82nd 83rd	Elected in 1944. Re-elected in 1946. Re-elected in 1948. Re-elected in 1950. Re-elected in 1952. [data missing]
John J. Bell (Cuero)	Democratic	January 3, 1955 – January 3, 1957	84th	Elected in 1954. Lost renomination.
John Andrew Young (Corpus Christi)	Democratic	January 3, 1957 – January 3, 1979	85th 86th 87th 88th 89th 90th 91st 92nd 93rd 94th 95th	Elected in 1956. Re-elected in 1958. Re-elected in 1960. Re-elected in 1962. Re-elected in 1964. Re-elected in 1966. Re-elected in 1968. Re-elected in 1970. Re-elected in 1972. Re-elected in 1974. Re-elected in 1976. Lost renomination.
Joseph P. Wyatt Jr. (Bloomington)	Democratic	January 3, 1979 – January 3, 1981	96th	Elected in 1978. [data missing]
Bill Patman (Ganado)	Democratic	January 3, 1981 – January 3, 1985	97th 98th	Elected in 1980. Re-elected in 1982. Lost re-election.
Mac Sweeney (Wharton)	Republican	January 3, 1985 – January 3, 1989	99th 100th	Elected in 1984. Re-elected in 1986. Lost re-election.
Greg Laughlin (West Columbia)	Democratic	January 3, 1989 – June 26, 1995	101st 102nd 103rd 104th	Elected in 1988. Re-elected in 1990. Re-elected in 1992. Re-elected in 1994. Lost renomination.
Greg Laughlin (West Columbia)	Republican	June 26, 1995 – January 3, 1997	104th	Elected in 1988. Re-elected in 1990. Re-elected in 1992. Re-elected in 1994. Lost renomination.
Ron Paul (Lake Jackson)	Republican	January 3, 1997 – January 3, 2013	105th 106th 107th 108th 109th 110th 111th 112th	Elected in 1996. Re-elected in 1998. Re-elected in 2000. Re-elected in 2002. Re-elected in 2004. Re-elected in 2006. Re-elected in 2008. Re-elected in 2010. Retired.
Randy Weber (Friendswood)	Republican	January 3, 2013 – present	113th 114th 115th 116th 117th 118th 119th	Elected in 2012. Re-elected in 2014. Re-elected in 2016. Re-elected in 2018. Re-elected in 2020. Re-elected in 2022. Re-elected in 2024. Re-elected in 2026.

== Election results ==
=== 1928 ===
The incumbent Harry M. Wurzbach successfully contested the 1928 election of the Democrat Augustus McCloskey to the 71st United States Congress, and was finally seated on February 10, 1930.

1928 election: Texas District 14
Party	Candidate	Votes	%	±%
Democratic	Augustus McCloskey	29,085	50.3	+7.5
Republican	Harry M. Wurzbach (Incumbent)	28,766	49.7	−7.5
Majority		319	0.6	−13.8
Turnout		57,851		
Democratic gain from Republican				

=== 1996 ===
In "one of the stranger Congressional elections of modern times", the incumbent Greg Laughlin switched from the Democratic Party to the Republican in 1995. The Republican National Committee, hoping to encourage other Democrats to switch parties, threw its full support behind Laughlin. He had support from Republican leaders, including House Speaker Newt Gingrich and Texas Governor George W. Bush, as well as the National Rifle Association of America and other interest groups. Ron Paul, an ob/gyn and former U.S. Representative from Texas's 22nd congressional district, opposed Laughlin. Paul hoped to have more influence in Congress after the Republicans took over both houses in the 1994 election. Though Laughlin defeated Paul in the open primary, a runoff between the two candidates followed.

While Gingrich and other Republican leaders visited the district stumping for Laughlin, Paul ran newspaper ads quoting Gingrich's harsh criticisms of Laughlin's voting record 14 months earlier, before the party switch. Paul won the low-turnout primary runoff with the assistance of a largely out-of-state free-market network of support, such as his Foundation for Rational Economics and Education and other market-oriented organizations. Though he continued to maintain his home in Lake Jackson, Texas, Paul had run for the coastal 14th Congressional district rather than the 22nd district he had previously represented, due to redistricting borders.

Charles "Lefty" Morris, a trial lawyer, was Paul's Democratic opponent in the fall election; he was strongly supported by the AFL–CIO and ran numerous attack ads. Morris cited Paul's past votes to repeal federal drug laws in favor of state legislation, and also ran numerous ads about newsletters which had contained derogatory comments published in Paul's name concerning race and other politicians. Paul's campaign responded at the time that voters might not understand the "tongue-in-cheek, academic" quotes out of context, and rejected Morris's demand to release back issues.

Paul's large contributor base outraised Morris two-to-one, giving him nearly $2 million, the third-highest amount of individual contributions received by any House member (behind Gingrich and Bob Dornan). In his campaign, Paul characterized Morris as a tool of trial lawyers and big labor.

Paul won the election by a close margin of 51% to 48%, the third time he had been elected to Congress as a non-incumbent.

1996 election: Texas District 14
Party	Candidate	Votes	%	±%
Republican	Ron Paul	99,961	51.1	+6.7
Democratic	Charles Morris	93,200	47.6	−8.0
Natural Law	Ed Fasanella	2,538	1.3	
Majority		6,761	3.5	−7.7
Turnout		195,699		
Republican hold		Swing		

=== 1998 ===
In 1998 Paul again won the Republican primary. The Democratic primary candidates included education professor Margaret Dunn; former congressional aide Roger Elliott; car dealer Tom Reed; and Bay City rice farmer and cattle rancher Loy Sneary. Reed, who claimed to be the only Texas-born candidate in the race, had served in local economic development projects and had been appointed to the White House Conference on Small Business; he was endorsed by the AFL–CIO. Sneary, a self-described "conservative Democrat" and also a former Matagorda County judge, prevailed in the primary; by December 31, 1997, including self-loans, Sneary had outraised Reed by $175,000 to $33,000.

The Democratic Congressional Campaign Committee made the general election its "No. 1 challenge race in the state of Texas". The Texas Farm Bureau endorsed Sneary and ranked Paul's agricultural record poorly. Sneary also said that Paul's anti-government stance left constituents inadequately represented. Paul ran ads warning voters to be "leery of Sneary". Paul accused Sneary of voting to raise his pay by 5%, increasing his judge's travel budget by 400% in one year, and creating more government bureaucracy by starting a new government agency to handle a license plate fee he enacted. Sneary considered Paul's attack to consist of "half-truths and no truths", claims supported by Austin TV station KVUE; his aides replied that he had actually voted to raise all county employees' pay by 5% in a "cost of living" increase. Paul countered that he had never voted to raise Congressional pay.

Paul won the election 55% to 44%, outraising his opponent by a large margin ($2.1 million to $0.7 million).

1998 election: Texas District 14
Party	Candidate	Votes	%	±%
Republican	Ron Paul (Incumbent)	84,459	55.3	+4.2
Democratic	Loy Sneary	68,014	44.5	−3.1
Independent	Cynthia Newman (Write-in)	390	0.3	
Majority		16,445	10.8	+7.3
Turnout		195,699		
Republican hold		Swing		

=== 2000 ===
In 2000, Sneary ran against Paul again, with Paul winning 60% to 40% and raising $2.4 million to Sneary's $1.1 million. As in the prior two elections, the national Democratic Party and major unions had continued targeting Paul with heavy spending.

2000 election: Texas District 14
Party	Candidate	Votes	%	±%
Republican	Ron Paul (Incumbent)	137,370	59.7	+4.4
Democratic	Loy Sneary	92,689	40.3	−4.2
Majority		44,681	19.4	+8.6
Turnout		230,059		
Republican hold		Swing		

=== 2002 ===
Paul was re-elected to Congress in 2002. Two Democrats without political experience ran for the primary, but not much support from the Democratic Party was visible. Local Democratic consultant Ed Martin criticized Paul's frequent budget dissents as "180 degrees opposite from" his campaign promises to protect Social Security. Paul's free-market foundation and network of support continued its fundraising strength.

2002 election: Texas District 14
Party	Candidate	Votes	%	±%
Republican	Ron Paul (Incumbent)	102,905	68.1	+8.4
Democratic	Corby Windham	48,224	31.9	−8.4
Majority		54,681	36.2	+16.8
Turnout		151,129		
Republican hold		Swing		

=== 2004 ===
Paul was re-elected to Congress in 2004 (running unopposed).

=== 2006 ===
In 2006, Paul was opposed in the primary race by Cynthia Sinatra, the ex-wife of Frank Sinatra Jr., son of the legendary singer. Paul won the primary handily with nearly 80%, though his opponent campaigned on Paul's lack of support for President George W. Bush. Paul then won the general election by 20%, entering his tenth term and outraising Shane Sklar $1.2 million to $0.6 million.

2006 US election: Texas District 14
Party	Candidate	Votes	%	±%
Republican	Ron Paul (incumbent)	94,375	60.2	−7.9
Democratic	Shane Sklar	62,421	39.8	+7.9
Majority		31,954	20.4	
Turnout		156,796		
Republican hold		Swing		

=== 2008 ===
In March 2007, Paul announced his candidacy for U.S. president. According to Texas law, Paul could run for president without having to relinquish his Congressional seat. In the 2008 primary, he was opposed by Chris Peden, who informally announced his challenge on May 22, 2007. Peden, a certified public accountant, was elected to the Friendswood city council in 2005 with 67%, and was chosen as mayor pro tem.

The Victoria Advocate and Galveston County Daily News both endorsed Peden. Paul had a larger national source of funding, while Peden raised more money from the district, the majority of which came from within his own family or loans to himself. Paul won 70% to 30%.

US House primary, 2008: Texas District 14
Party	Candidate	Votes	%	±%
Republican	Ron Paul (incumbent)	37,220	70.2	
Republican	Chris Peden	15,813	29.8	
Majority		21,407	40.4	
Turnout		53,033	100	

On November 4, 2008, Paul was reelected. The election was uncontested because the Democrats did not run a candidate.

=== 2010 ===
On March 2, Ron Paul won the Republican Party nomination for re-election to the US House. Robert Pruett and Winston Cochran from the Democratic Party faced a runoff election in April to determine which one will get the nomination, a faced a runoff election in April to determine which one will get the nominations neither received a majority. Pruett won the run off election with just 52% of the vote, and lost to Paul in the general election.

US House primaries, 2010: Texas District 14
Party	Candidate	Votes	%	±%
Republican	Ron Paul (incumbent)	45,947	80.7	
Republican	Tim Graney	5,536	9.7	
Republican	John Gay	3,003	5.3	
Republican	Gerald Wall	2,402	4.3	
Turnout		56,888	100	
Democratic	Robert Pruett	6,836	41.5	
Democratic	Winston Cochran	5,107	31.1	
Democratic	Jeff Cherry	4,493	27.4	
Turnout		16,436	100	

2010 election: Texas District 14
Party	Candidate	Votes	%	±%
Republican	Ron Paul (incumbent)	140,623	76.0	+15.8
Democratic	Robert Pruett	44,431	24.0	−15.8
Majority		96,192	52.0	
Turnout		185,054		
Republican hold		Swing		

=== 2012 ===
On July 11, 2011, Ron Paul announced that he would not seek re-election to the US House. Randy Weber and Felicia Harris from the Republican Party faced a runoff election in July to determine which one would get the nomination, a faced a runoff election in July to determine which one would get the nominations neither received a majority. Weber won the run off election with 63% of the vote, and went on to win the general election against Democrat Nick Lampson.

US House primary, 2012: Texas District 14
Party	Candidate	Votes	%	±%
Republican	Randy Weber	12,062	27.6	
Republican	Felicia Harris	8,268	18.9	
Republican	Michael J. Truncale	6,197	14.2	
Republican	Jay Old	6,136	14.0	
Republican	Michael Truncale	6,197	14.2	
Republican	Robert Gonzalez	4,277	9.8	
Republican	Bill Sargent	3,309	7.6	
Republican	George Harper	829	1.9	
Republican	Mark Mansius	549	1.3	
Turnout		43,691	100	
Democratic	Nick Lampson	18,470	83.2	
Democratic	Linda Dailey	3,719	16.8	
Turnout		22,189	100	

2012 election: Texas District 14
Party	Candidate	Votes	%	±%
Republican	Randy Weber	130,937	53.5	
Democratic	Nick Lampson	109,264	44.6	
Majority		21,502	8.9	
Turnout		240,201	100	
Republican hold		Swing		

=== 2014 ===
Randy Weber ran for re-election in the 2014 general election, easily defeating his Democratic opponent Donald Brown.

2014 election: Texas District 14
Party	Candidate	Votes	%	±%
Republican	Randy Weber (incumbent)	90,116	61.8	+8.3%
Democratic	Donald Brown	52,545	36.1	−8.5%
Libertarian	John Wieder	3,037	2.1	+2.1%
Majority		37,571	25.7	
Turnout		145,698	100	
Republican hold		Swing		

=== 2016 ===
2016 election: Texas District 14
Party	Candidate	Votes	%	±%
Republican	Randy Weber (incumbent)	160,631	61.9	nil
Democratic	Michael Cole	99,054	38.1	+2.1
Majority		61,577	23.7	−2.1
Turnout		259,685	100	
Republican hold		Swing		

=== 2018 ===
2018 election: Texas District 14
Party	Candidate	Votes	%	±%
Republican	Randy Weber (incumbent)	138,942	59.2	−2.6
Democratic	Adrienne Bell	92,212	39.3	+1.2
Libertarian	Don Conley III	3,374	1.4	+1.4
Majority		46,730	19.9	−3.8
Turnout		234,528		
Republican hold		Swing		

=== 2020 ===
2020 election: Texas District 14
Party	Candidate	Votes	%
Republican	Randy Weber (incumbent)	190,541	61.6
Democratic	Adrienne Bell	118,574	38.4
Total votes		309,115	100
Republican hold			

=== 2022 ===
2022 election: Texas District 14
Party	Candidate	Votes	%
Republican	Randy Weber (incumbent)	149,543	68.5
Democratic	Mikal Williams	68,606	31.4
Total votes		218,149	100
Republican hold			

=== 2024 ===
2024 election: Texas District 14
Party	Candidate	Votes	%
Republican	Randy Weber (incumbent)	210,320	68.69
Democratic	Rhonda Hart	95,875	31.31
Total votes		306,195	100.00
Republican hold			

== Historical district boundaries ==
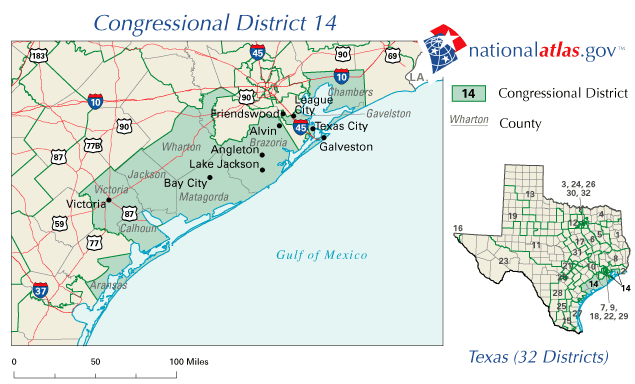
2007–2013

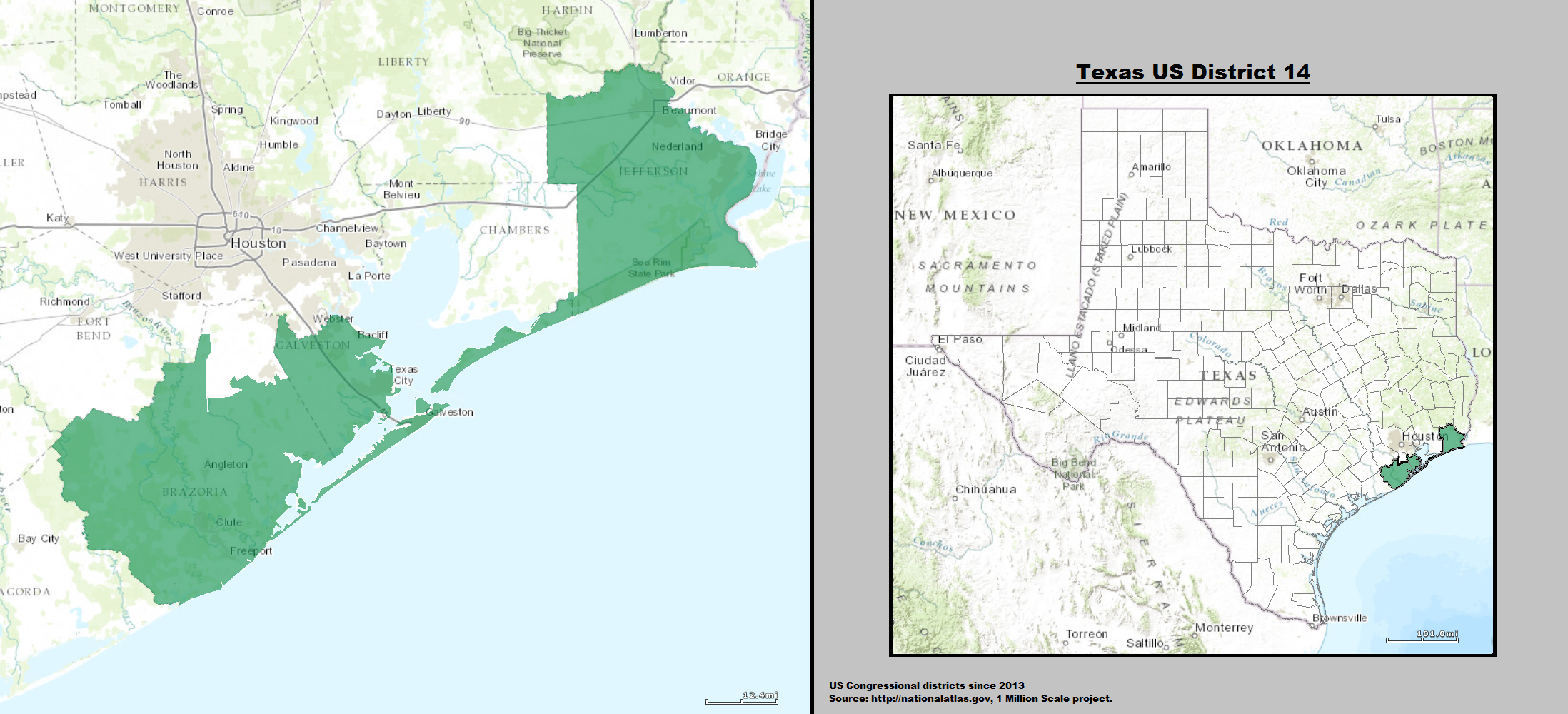
2013–2023

== See also ==
- List of United States congressional districts
