= Holiday Lakes, Texas =

- Town
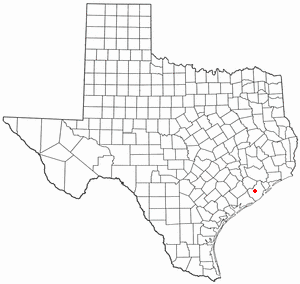
- Location of Holiday Lakes, Texas

- Coordinates: 29°12′34″N 95°31′5″W
- Country: United States
- State: Texas
- County: Brazoria

Government
  - Type: Mayor-council government
  - Mayor: Norman Schroeder
  - City Council: Joyce Carr; Lorenzo Macias; Terry Mitchell; Kay Young; Disa Schulze

Area
  - Total: 0.98 sq mi (2.53 km^{2})
  - Land: 0.88 sq mi (2.28 km^{2})
  - Water: 0.097 sq mi (0.25 km^{2})
- Elevation: 36 ft (11 m)

Population (2020)
  - Total: 991
  - Density: 1,421.0/sq mi (548.67/km^{2})
- Time zone: UTC-6 (Central (CST))
  - Summer (DST): UTC-5 (CDT)
- FIPS code: 48-34502
- GNIS feature ID: 1388556
- Website: holidaylakestexas.com

Holiday Lakes is a town in Brazoria County, Texas, United States. The population was 991 at the 2020 census.

== Geography ==
Holiday Lakes is at 29°12′34″N 95°31′5″W (29.209468, –95.517959), 7 miles (11 km) northwest of Angleton, the Brazoria County seat. The town consists of residential areas built around five small lakes, 29 Palms Lakes, Lake Alaska, Lake Yukon, Timber Lake, and Lake Aniak, all situated about 2 miles (3 km) east of the Brazos River.

According to the United States Census Bureau, the town has a total area of 0.97 square miles (2.5 km^{2}), of which 0.85 square miles (2.2 km^{2}) is land and 0.12 square miles (0.3 km^{2}), or 10.68%, is water.

== Demographics ==
Historical population
Census	Pop.	Note	%±
1990	1,039		—
2000	1,095		5.4%
2010	1,107		1.1%
2020	991		−10.5%
U.S. Decennial Census

Holiday Lakes racial composition as of 2020 (NH = Non-Hispanic) (Note: Note: the US Census treats Hispanic/Latino as an ethnic category. This table excludes Latinos from the racial categories and assigns them to a separate category. Hispanics/Latinos can be of any race.)
Race	Number	Percentage
White (NH)	284	28.66%
Black or African American (NH)	12	1.21%
Native American or Alaska Native (NH)	4	0.4%
Asian (NH)	2	0.2%
Pacific Islander (NH)	1	0.1%
Mixed/Multi-Racial (NH)	15	1.51%
Hispanic or Latino	673	67.91%
Total	991	

As of the 2020 United States census, there were 991 people, 298 households, and 240 families residing in the town.

At the 2000 census there were 1,095 people, 342 households, and 260 families in the town. The population density was 1,124.7 inhabitants per square mile (434.2/km^{2}). There were 412 housing units at an average density of 423.2 per square mile (163.4/km^{2}). The racial makeup of the town was 73.97% White, 2.65% African American, 1.55% Native American, 18.81% from other races, and 3.01% from two or more races. Hispanic or Latino of any race were 47.21%.

Of the 342 households 45.9% had children under the age of 18 living with them, 60.2% were married couples living together, 7.9% had a female householder with no husband present, and 23.7% were non-families. 18.7% of households were one person and 7.3% were one person aged 65 or older. The average household size was 3.20 and the average family size was 3.71.

The age distribution was 36.6% under the age of 18, 8.5% from 18 to 24, 28.2% from 25 to 44, 19.4% from 45 to 64, and 7.3% 65 or older. The median age was 29 years. For every 100 females, there were 105.8 males. For every 100 females age 18 and over, there were 107.2 males.

The median household income was $33,938 and the median family income was $34,931. Males had a median income of $29,750 versus $19,750 for females. The per capita income for the town was $12,463. About 12.0% of families and 15.8% of the population were below the poverty line, including 19.3% of those under age 18 and 6.6% of those age 65 or over.

== Government ==
The Town of Holiday Lakes shares some services with Brazoria County and provides some, like water and solid waste collection, on its own. The Town receives police service from the Holiday Lakes Police Department and Brazoria County Sheriff's Department. It receives fire services from the Angleton Volunteer Fire Department. Brazoria County lists the Holiday Lakes Fire Department, but the location listed as the Department's station contains only a bungalow is not acknowledged by the Town's website as a provider.

Organized under as a Mayor–council government, the town divides responsibilities among its five Town Councilors, though such a structure is not codified. The Town's website states the Mayor is responsible for budgeting and finance, office and personnel and emergency management, as well as water plant and utility operations. Town Councilor place 1 is responsible for street signage, house numbering and environmental health. Town Councilor place 2 is responsible for town cleanliness, parks and recreation and managing the Town's lakes - Lake Alaska, Yukon and Aniak. Town Councilor place 3 is responsible for maintenance and repairs of town-owned buildings and equipment. Town Councilor place 4 acts as the liaison for the Town's municipal court and oversees enforcement of the city's ordinances and managing town lighting. Town Councilor place 5 serves as Mayor pro tem, coordinates grants and county contracts, acts as a liaison for the Town's utilities and police department and manages utility operations and inventory along with overseeing roads and drainage.

The Town's mayor, Norman Schroeder, served as mayor between 1981 and 1984, 1992 and 1996, and continually since 2006.

=== State Representation ===
Republican Representative Cody Vasut of District 25 and Republican Senator Joan Huffman of District 17 represent the Town of Holiday Lakes in the Texas House of Representatives and in the Texas State Senate.

=== Federal Representation ===
Republican Senators John Cornyn and Ted Cruz represents Texas in the United States Senate. In the United States House of Representatives, Republican Representative Randy Weber represents Texas's 14th congressional district.

== Education ==
The town is located in Angleton Independent School District, including Angleton High School.

The Texas Legislature designated portions of Angleton ISD that by September 1, 1995, had not been annexed by Alvin Community College as in the Brazosport College zone. As Holiday Lakes is not in the maps of Alvin CC, it is in the Brazosport College zone.
