= Harry M. Wurzbach =

American politician (1874–1931)

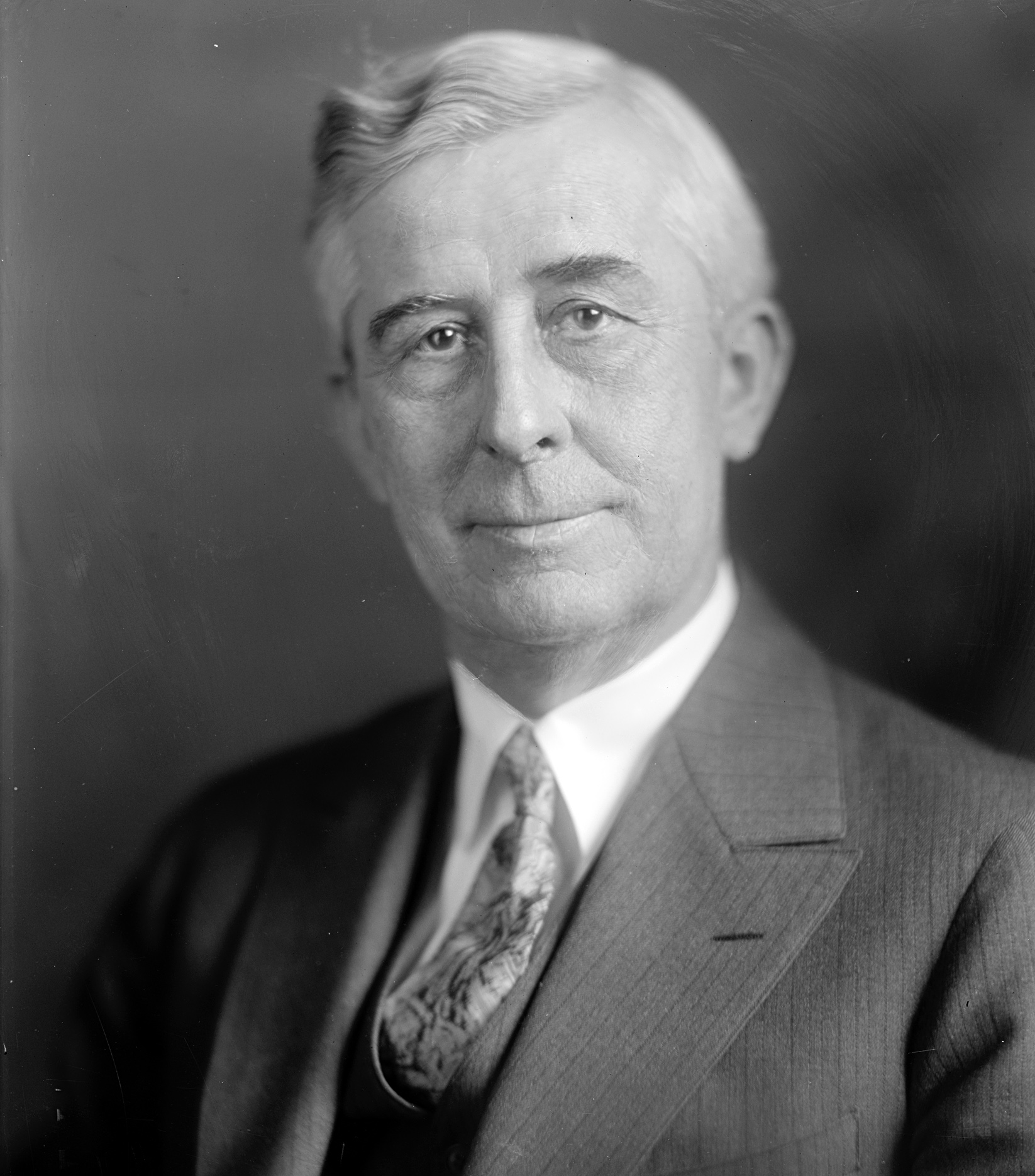

Member of the U.S. House of Representatives from Texas's 14th district
- In office March 4, 1921 – March 3, 1929
- Preceded by: Carlos Bee
- Succeeded by: Augustus McCloskey
- In office February 10, 1930 – November 6, 1931
- Preceded by: Augustus McCloskey
- Succeeded by: Richard M. Kleberg

County Judge of Guadalupe County, Texas
- In office 1904–1910

Personal details
- Born: Harry McLeary Wurzbach; May 19, 1874 San Antonio, Texas, U.S.
- Died: November 6, 1931 (aged 57) Seguin, Texas, U.S.
- Resting place: San Antonio National Cemetery
- Party: Republican
- Spouse: Frances Darden Wagner Wurzbach
- Relations: Bob Eckhardt (nephew)
- Education: Washington and Lee University School of Law
- Occupation: Lawyer

Military service
- Branch/service: United States Army
- Years of service: 1896–1898
- Rank: Private
- Unit: Company F, First Regiment, Texas Volunteer Infantry
- Battles/wars: Spanish–American War

Harry McLeary Wurzbach (May 19, 1874 – November 6, 1931) was an American attorney and politician. He was the first Republican elected to the United States House of Representatives from Texas since Reconstruction to be elected for more than two terms and was re-elected to the Sixty-eighth, Sixty-ninth, and Seventieth congresses, representing Texas's 14th congressional district for several terms, from 1921 to 1929. He was re-elected in 1930 to the Seventy-second Congress and died in office. The first Republican elected from Texas who was born in the state, he was the only Republican from Texas serving in Congress during this period.

== Early life and education ==
Wurzbach was born in San Antonio, Texas to Charles Louis Wurzbach and the former Kate Fink, who were ethnic Germans, descendants of immigrants. He attended public schools. He went to Virginia for college, graduating in 1896 from Washington and Lee University School of Law in Lexington. That same year, he was admitted to the Texas bar and established his practice in San Antonio.

== Marriage and family ==
After starting his law practice, Wurzbach married Frances Darden Wagner of Columbus, Texas, in the Episcopal Church there.

== Military service ==
During the Spanish–American War (1898), Wurzbach volunteered as a private in Company F, First Regiment, Texas Volunteer Infantry. The unit served three months in the army of occupation in Cuba.

== Political career ==
After the war, in 1900 Wurzbach and his wife relocated to Seguin in Guadalupe County, where he continued his law practice.

Guadalupe County had a high proportion of people of ethnic German ancestry, many of whom were immigrants or their descendants from after the revolutions of 1848 in the German states. Historically many, and perhaps most, of the German immigrants who settled in Central Texas before the American Civil War had opposed slavery and quietly favored the Union.

After the Civil War, during the Reconstruction era and well into the mid-20th century, many German-American Texans supported the Republican Party. The party was also supported by African-American voters, but most were disfranchised after 1901, when the legislature imposed a poll tax. With its German-American heritage, Guadalupe County was the third-most reliably Republican county in the state through 1964.

In the late 19th century, the Populist Party attracted many white voters, including in the agrarian South. In 1896, Republican Robert B. Hawley of Galveston, Texas, was elected as a Representative from Texas's 10th congressional district of the Greater Houston area; he won again in 1898, serving in total from 1897 to 1901. He won both elections by a plurality, when many white voters split between supporting the Democratic and Populist parties.

The Democratic-dominated legislature worked to prevent losing power again through split tickets or coalitions, as well as to disfranchise blacks, which was the goal of all southern legislatures. It adopted a poll tax in 1901, which resulted in the intended effect of almost eliminating voting by blacks, as well as many Latinos and poor whites. In addition, the state adopted white primaries. The blacks had been loyal Republicans since emancipation and passage of amendments granting citizenship and suffrage. The Democrat-dominated Texas state legislature was following those of other states of the former Confederacy in working to disfranchise blacks; from 1890 to 1910, southern states passed constitutional amendments, new constitutions and laws that achieved this. The Democrats essentially established a one-party state.

Immediately becoming active in local politics after moving to Seguin, Wurzbach was elected as the Guadalupe County prosecuting attorney from 1900 to 1902. Running as a Democrat in 1902, he lost a race for County Judge (the chief administrative officer of a Texas county). But after "seeing the error of my ways," he ran as a Republican and was elected as County Judge from 1904 to 1910. The campaign in 1910 was personally bitter, and he resigned a few days after the election, returning to his law practice.

=== 1916 return to politics ===
By 1916 Harry Wurzbach had returned to campaigning. He ran on the Republican ticket for United States Congressman from Texas's 15th congressional district, against the popular incumbent, John Nance Garner, who had held the seat since 1902 when the district was created. Wurzbach lost 3 to 1 across the district, failing to carry Guadalupe County. Garner was elected for a total of 14 consecutive terms from this district.

When the U.S. entered the war against the German Empire in 1917, the local German Americans suffered a wave of hatred, and were accused of being traitorous sympathizers to the Kaiser's side. To defuse tensions, Wurzbach helped to organize a show of loyalty by his fellow German Americans, who became active in the Red Cross and the "First Aid Legion", and publicized their purchase of many war bonds.

Wurzbach took Alvin J. Wirtz as a law partner. His wife was the daughter of a popular and well-connected doctor in Seguin. Wirtz was from Columbus, Texas, as was Wurzbach's wife. They opened their offices in the First National Bank Building in 1917. They also worked in the Guadalupe County Abstract Company, Wurzbach as Manager and Wirtz as Secretary. Wurzbach became a lifelong mentor to his partner, who was 14 years younger.

Wurzbach had a place on the Republican ticket in 1918, as a state-wide candidate for judge of the Court of Criminal Appeals. He was crushed, losing by 7 to 1 to the Democratic candidate, but he carried his home county.

In 1920, redistricting moved Guadalupe County out of Garner's 15th district, and into the 14th congressional district. Wurzbach ran for Congress in the general election, and unseated the freshman Democratic Representative Carlos Bee of San Antonio, 17,265 (55.6 percent) to 13,777 (44.4 percent). Reflecting the high rate of immigration and migration to Texas for decades, Wurzbach was the first native Texan to win election as a Republican to Congress. In 1922, 1924, and 1926, Wurzbach won by margins of 54.8, 62.4, and 57.2 percent, respectively, the first Republican since Reconstruction to win more than two terms. He won his seat even as the Republican presidential candidates in 1920 and 1924, Warren G. Harding and Calvin Coolidge, lost the electoral vote of Texas. The Democratic-majority state had supported Democrats for president since the end of Reconstruction and continued to do so into the 1940s.

Wurzbach was a delegate to the 1924 Republican National Convention in Cleveland, Ohio, which nominated President Coolidge. But despite the opportunity that Wurzbach's election gave the Republicans, the national party leaders did not welcome him. They preferred to keep control of patronage jobs to themselves, and worked to undermine him.

In 1928, the powerful, patronage-based Democratic machine in San Antonio (along with Sam Johnson and Archie Parr) targeted Wurzbach for defeat, and returns appeared to show him losing reelection. That year, the Republican Presidential candidate Herbert Hoover carried Texas over the Democrat Al Smith, whom many Southern Democrats opposed because he was Roman Catholic. Wurzbach polled 27,206 (49.7 percent) to a reported 29,055 (50.3 percent) for the Democrat Augustus McCloskey of San Antonio.

Wurzbach contested the election, claiming irregularities. He appealed his case to the Republican-controlled House of Representatives. After an investigation into the corrupt voting practices in San Antonio, the House ultimately reversed McCloskey's election (after he had served for eleven months) and seated Wurzbach on February 10, 1930. Wurzbach won another term in November 1930, when he polled an impressive 27,206 (59.3 percent) to Democrat Henry B. Dielmann's 18,707 (40.7 percent).

=== 1930 indictment ===
While contesting the 1928 election, Wurzbach was charged in 1930 with violating the Federal Corrupt Practices Act for receiving money from federal employees for his primary campaign. The District Court threw out the indictment, based on two grounds: 1) That the term "political purpose" in the law did not include the behavior in question; and 2) If the term did include the behavior, then the Act was unconstitutional, as it was applied to state activities beyond its scope, not a federal election. The Democratic US Attorney appealed the case to the United States Supreme Court, which ruled in United States v. Wurzbach against the lower court, and remanded the case for resolution. The case may have been dropped; Wurzbach died in 1931 and his official congressional biography does not refer to the charges.

With the Great Depression gathering force, Republican incumbents lost many seats in 1930, but the party still had majority control of the House of Representatives. Wurzbach died in office in 1931. His seat was filled by a special election, won by the Democrats. They gained control of Congress with 217 seats to the Republicans' 215. The Republican Party did not regain a majority in the House until after the 1946 elections.

Because of the disfranchisement of African Americans by the dominant Democratic Party in the state, after Wurzbach, no other Republican was elected to represent Texas in Congress until 1950, when Ben H. Guill won a special election, serving the remaining eight months of the term.

== Death ==
Wurzbach died at 2 a.m. on November 6, 1931, at his home in Seguin, from complications following an appendectomy. His death was a surprise; his surgery was not considered an emergency and he had otherwise been in good health. Wurzbach is interred at the San Antonio National Cemetery, based on his military service.

== Legacy and honors ==
- In 1922, Wurzbach was the only Representative from Texas to vote for the Dyer Anti-Lynching Bill, sponsored by Congressman Leonidas C. Dyer of St. Louis, Missouri.
- Harry Wurzbach Road in his hometown of San Antonio, TX, is named after him. Wurzbach Parkway, however, is named in honor of his brother William, as a continuation of Wurzbach Rd. William Wurzbach owned a large ranch at the area that is currently the Medical Center.
- His papers were collected by the University of Texas at Austin.
- The bell tower at St Andrew's Episcopal Church in Seguin, where he had served on the Vestry, was erected in his memory.
- Bob Eckhardt of Houston, a nephew of Wurzbach, became a politician and was elected as a Democratic Congressman.

== See also ==
- List of members of the United States Congress who died in office (1900–1949)

U.S. House of Representatives
Preceded by Carlos Bee	Member of the U.S. House of Representatives from Texas's 14th congressional district 1921–1929	Succeeded by Augustus McCloskey (disputed)
Preceded by Augustus McCloskey (disputed)	Member of the U.S. House of Representatives from Texas's 14th congressional district 1930–1931	Succeeded by Richard M. Kleberg
