= List of United States Supreme Court cases, volume 280 =

Supreme Court of the United States
- Interactive map of Supreme Court of the United States
- 38°53′26″N 77°00′16″W
- Established: March 4, 1789; 236 years ago
- Location: Washington, D.C.
- Coordinates: 38°53′26″N 77°00′16″W
- Composition method: Presidential nomination with Senate confirmation
- Authorised by: Constitution of the United States, Art. III, § 1
- Judge term length: life tenure, subject to impeachment and removal
- Number of positions: 9 (by statute)
- Website: supremecourt.gov

This is a list of cases reported in volume 280 of United States Reports, decided by the Supreme Court of the United States in 1929 and 1930.

== Justices of the Supreme Court at the time of volume 280 U.S. ==
The Supreme Court is established by Article III, Section 1 of the Constitution of the United States, which says: "The judicial Power of the United States, shall be vested in one supreme Court . . .". The size of the Court is not specified; the Constitution leaves it to Congress to set the number of justices. Under the Judiciary Act of 1789 Congress originally fixed the number of justices at six (one chief justice and five associate justices). Since 1789 Congress has varied the size of the Court from six to seven, nine, ten, and back to nine justices (always including one chief justice).

When the cases in volume 280 were decided the Court comprised the following nine members:

Portrait	Justice	Office	Home State	Succeeded	Date confirmed by the Senate (Vote)	Tenure on Supreme Court
	William Howard Taft	Chief Justice	Connecticut	Edward Douglass White	June 30, 1921 (Acclamation)	July 11, 1921 – February 3, 1930 (Retired)
	Oliver Wendell Holmes Jr.	Associate Justice	Massachusetts	Horace Gray	December 4, 1902 (Acclamation)	December 8, 1902 – January 12, 1932 (Retired)
	Willis Van Devanter	Associate Justice	Wyoming	Edward Douglass White (as Associate Justice)	December 15, 1910 (Acclamation)	January 3, 1911 – June 2, 1937 (Retired)
	James Clark McReynolds	Associate Justice	Tennessee	Horace Harmon Lurton	August 29, 1914 (44–6)	October 12, 1914 – January 31, 1941 (Retired)
	Louis Brandeis	Associate Justice	Massachusetts	Joseph Rucker Lamar	June 1, 1916 (47–22)	June 5, 1916 – February 13, 1939 (Retired)
	George Sutherland	Associate Justice	Utah	John Hessin Clarke	September 5, 1922 (Acclamation)	October 2, 1922 – January 17, 1938 (Retired)
	Pierce Butler	Associate Justice	Minnesota	William R. Day	December 21, 1922 (61–8)	January 2, 1923 – November 16, 1939 (Died)
	Edward Terry Sanford	Associate Justice	Tennessee	Mahlon Pitney	January 29, 1923 (Acclamation)	February 19, 1923 – March 8, 1930 (Died)
	Harlan F. Stone	Associate Justice	New York	Joseph McKenna	February 5, 1925 (71–6)	March 2, 1925 – July 2, 1941 (Continued as chief justice)

== Federal court system ==
Under the Judiciary Act of 1789 the federal court structure at the time comprised District Courts, which had general trial jurisdiction; Circuit Courts, which had mixed trial and appellate (from the US District Courts) jurisdiction; and the United States Supreme Court, which had appellate jurisdiction over the federal District and Circuit courts—and for certain issues over state courts. The Supreme Court also had limited original jurisdiction (i.e., in which cases could be filed directly with the Supreme Court without first having been heard by a lower federal or state court). There were one or more federal District Courts and/or Circuit Courts in each state, territory, or other geographical region.

The Judiciary Act of 1891 created the United States Courts of Appeals and reassigned the jurisdiction of most routine appeals from the district and circuit courts to these appellate courts. The Act created nine new courts that were originally known as the "United States Circuit Courts of Appeals." The new courts had jurisdiction over most appeals of lower court decisions. The Supreme Court could review either legal issues that a court of appeals certified or decisions of court of appeals by writ of certiorari. On January 1, 1912, the effective date of the Judicial Code of 1911, the old Circuit Courts were abolished, with their remaining trial court jurisdiction transferred to the U.S. District Courts.

== List of cases in volume 280 U.S. ==
Case name	Citation	Opinion of the Court	Vote	Concurring opinion or statement	Dissenting opinion or statement	Procedural jurisdiction	Result
Gonzalez v. Roman Catholic Archbishop of Manila	280 U.S. 1 (1929)	Brandeis	9–0	none	none	certiorari to the Supreme Court of the Philippines (Phil.)	judgment affirmed
Federal Trade Commission v. Klesner	280 U.S. 19 (1929)	Brandeis	9–0	none	none	certiorari to the United States Court of Appeals for the District of Columbia (D.C. Cir.)	judgment affirmed
Sanitary Refrigerator Company v. Winters	280 U.S. 30 (1929)	Sanford	9–0	none	none	certiorari to the United States Court of Appeals for the Seventh Circuit (7th Cir.) and to the United States Court of Appeals for the Third Circuit (3d Cir.)	one case affirmed; one case reversed
Colgate, Administrator v. United States	280 U.S. 43 (1929)	Taft	9–0	none	none	appeal from the United States Court of Claims (Ct. Cl.)	appeal dismissed
Wheeler v. Greene, Receiver of the Bankers Joint Stock Land Bank of Milwaukee	280 U.S. 49 (1929)	Holmes	9–0	none	none	certiorari to the United States Court of Appeals for the Seventh Circuit (7th Cir.)	decree reversed
Interstate Commerce Commission v. United States ex rel. City of Los Angeles	280 U.S. 52 (1929)	Taft	9–0	none	none	certiorari to the United States Court of Appeals for the District of Columbia (D.C. Cir.)	judgment reversed
General Insurance Company of America v. Northern Pacific Railway Company	280 U.S. 72 (1929)	Taft	9–0	none	none	certiorari to the United States Court of Appeals for the Ninth Circuit (9th Cir.)	judgment affirmed
Williams v. Riley, State Controller of California	280 U.S. 78 (1929)	McReynolds	9–0	Taft, VanDevanter, and Butler (joint short statement)	none	appeal from the United States District Court for the Northern District of California (N.D. Cal.)	decree affirmed
Bekins Van Lines, Inc. v. Riley, State Controller of California	280 U.S. 80 (1929)	McReynolds	9–0	none	none	appeal from the United States District Court for the Northern District of California (N.D. Cal.)	judgment affirmed
Safe Deposit and Trust Company of Baltimore v. Virginia	280 U.S. 83 (1929)	McReynolds	8–1	Stone (opinion; with which Brandeis concurred)	Holmes (opinion)	appeal from the Special Court of Appeals of Virginia	judgment reversed, and cause remanded
United States v. Erie Railroad Company	280 U.S. 98 (1929)	Brandeis	9–0	none	none	appeal from the United States District Court for the District of New Jersey (D.N.J.)	judgment reversed
Chesapeake and Ohio Railway Company v. Mihas	280 U.S. 102 (1929)	Sutherland	9–0	none	none	certiorari to the Illinois Appellate Court (Ill. App. Ct.) and the Illinois Supreme Court (Ill.)	judgment reversed, and cause remanded
Wick v. Chelan Electric Company	280 U.S. 108 (1929)	Butler	9–0	none	none	appeal from the Washington Supreme Court (Wash.)	appeal dismissed
Herbring v. Lee, Insurance Commissioner of Oregon	280 U.S. 111 (1929)	Sanford	9–0	none	none	appeal from the Oregon Supreme Court (Or.)	judgment affirmed
Silver v. Silver	280 U.S. 117 (1929)	Stone	9–0	none	none	appeal from the Connecticut Supreme Court (Conn.)	judgment affirmed
Bromley v. McCaughn, Collector of Internal Revenue	280 U.S. 124 (1929)	Stone	6–3	none	Sutherland (opinion; with which VanDevanter and Butler concurred)	certified questions from the United States Court of Appeals for the Third Circuit (3d Cir.)	certified questions answered
Ex parte Northern Pacific Railroad Company	280 U.S. 142 (1929)	per curiam	9–0	none	none	petition for writ of mandamus to the United States District Court for the District of Montana (D. Mont.)	mandamus granted
Railroad Commission of California v. Los Angeles Railway Corporation	280 U.S. 145 (1929)	Butler	6–3	McReynolds (short statement)	Brandeis (opinion; joined by Holmes); Stone (opinion)	appeal from the United States District Court for the Southern District of California (S.D. Cal.)	decree affirmed
Ex parte Hobbs, Commissioner of Insurance of Kansas	280 U.S. 168 (1929)	Holmes	9–0	none	none	petition for writ of mandamus to the United States District Court for the District of Kansas (D. Kan.)	mandamus denied
Luckenbach Steamship Company v. United States	280 U.S. 173 (1930)	Taft	9–0	none	none	certiorari to the United States Court of Claims (Ct. Cl.)	judgment reversed
United States v. Jackson	280 U.S. 183 (1930)	Taft	9–0	none	none	certified questions from the United States Court of Appeals for the Ninth Circuit (9th Cir.)	certified questions answered
Wabash Railway Company v. Barclay	280 U.S. 197 (1930)	Holmes	9–0	none	none	certiorari to the United States Court of Appeals for the Second Circuit (2d Cir.)	decree reversed
Farmers' Loan and Trust Company, Executor v. Minnesota	280 U.S. 204 (1930)	McReynolds	7–2	Stone (opinion)	Holmes (opinion; with which Brandeis agreed)	appeal from the Minnesota Supreme Court (Minn.)	judgment reversed, and cause remanded
Corn Exchange Bank v. Coler, Commissioner of Public Welfare	280 U.S. 218 (1930)	McReynolds	9–0	none	none	appeal from the New York Court of Appeals (N.Y.)	judgment affirmed
Kothe, Trustee v. R.C. Taylor Trust	280 U.S. 224 (1930)	McReynolds	9–0	none	none	certiorari to the United States Court of Appeals for the First Circuit (1st Cir.)	decree reversed, and cause remanded
Reinecke, Collector of Internal Revenue v. Spalding	280 U.S. 227 (1930)	McReynolds	8-0[a]	none	none	certiorari to the United States Court of Appeals for the Seventh Circuit (7th Cir.)	judgment reversed
United Railways and Electric Company of Baltimore v. West	280 U.S. 234 (1930)	Sutherland	6–3	none	Brandeis (opinion; joined by Holmes); Stone (opinion)	appeals from the Maryland Court of Appeals (Md.)	in one case decree reversed, and cause remanded; in one case cross-appeal dismissed, and certiorari denied
International Shoe Company v. Federal Trade Commission	280 U.S. 291 (1930)	Sutherland	6–3	none	Stone (opinion; with which Holmes and Brandeis concurred)	certiorari to the United States Court of Appeals for the First Circuit (1st Cir.)	judgment reversed
Wilbur, Secretary of the Interior v. United States ex rel. Krushnic	280 U.S. 306 (1930)	Sutherland	9–0	none	none	certiorari to the United States Court of Appeals for the District of Columbia (D.C. Cir.)	judgment affirmed
Johnson v. United States Shipping Board Emergency Fleet Corporation	280 U.S. 320 (1930)	Butler	9–0	none	none	certiorari to the United States Court of Appeals for the Second Circuit (2d Cir.)	judgments in three cases reversed and remanded; judgment in one case affirmed
Brewster v. Gage, Collector of Internal Revenue	280 U.S. 327 (1930)	Butler	9–0	none	none	certiorari to the United States Court of Appeals for the Second Circuit (2d Cir.)	judgment affirmed
New Jersey Bell Telephone Company v. State Board of Taxes and Assessments of New Jersey	280 U.S. 338 (1930)	Butler	6-2[b]	none	Holmes (opinion; with which Brandeis agreed)	appeals from the New Jersey Court of Errors and Appeals (N.J.)	judgment reversed
Grant v. A.B. Leach and Company, Inc.	280 U.S. 351 (1930)	Sanford	9–0	none	none	certiorari to the United States Court of Appeals for the Sixth Circuit (6th Cir.)	judgment reversed, and cause remanded
Carpenter v. Shaw	280 U.S. 363 (1930)	Stone	9–0	none	none	certiorari to the Oklahoma Supreme Court (Okla.)	judgment reversed, and cause remanded
Henry Ford and Son, Inc. v. Little Falls Fibre Company	280 U.S. 369 (1930)	Stone	9–0	none	none	certiorari to the New York Supreme Court (N.Y. Sup. Ct.)	affirmed
Ohio ex rel. Popovici v. Agler	280 U.S. 379 (1930)	Holmes	9–0	none	none	certiorari to the Ohio Supreme Court (Ohio)	judgment affirmed
Clarke v. Haberle Crystal Springs Brewing Company	280 U.S. 384 (1930)	Holmes	9–0	McReynolds and Stone (without opinions)	none	certiorari to the United States Court of Appeals for the Second Circuit (2d Cir.)	judgment reversed
Renziehausen v. Lucas	280 U.S. 387 (1930)	Holmes	9–0	McReynolds and Stone (without opinions)	none	certiorari to the United States Court of Appeals for the Third Circuit (3d Cir.)	decree affirmed
Superior Oil Company v. Mississippi ex rel. Knox	280 U.S. 390 (1930)	Holmes	7–2	none	VanDevanter and Butler (without opinions)	appeal from the Mississippi Supreme Court (Miss.)	judgment affirmed
United States v. Wurzbach	280 U.S. 396 (1930)	Holmes	9–0	none	none	appeal from the United States District Court for the Western District of Texas (W.D. Tex.)	judgment reversed
Mineral Separation Corporation, Ltd. v. Magma Copper Company	280 U.S. 400 (1930)	Holmes	9–0	none	none	certiorari to the United States Court of Appeals for the First Circuit (1st Cir.)	decree affirmed
Chesapeake and Ohio Railway Company v. Bryant	280 U.S. 404 (1930)	Holmes	9–0	none	none	certiorari to the Supreme Court of Appeals of Virginia (Va.)	judgment affirmed
Davis v. Preston	280 U.S. 406 (1930)	VanDevanter	9–0	none	none	certiorari to the Texas Supreme Court (Tex.)	writ of certiorari dismissed
Cooper v. United States	280 U.S. 409 (1930)	McReynolds	9–0	none	none	certiorari to the United States Court of Claims (Ct. Cl.)	judgment affirmed
United States v. American Can Company	280 U.S. 412 (1930)	McReynolds	9–0	none	none	certiorari to the United States Court of Appeals for the Third Circuit (3d Cir.)	judgments reversed, and causes remanded
Tagg Brothers and Moorhead v. United States	280 U.S. 420 (1930)	Brandeis	9–0	none	none	appeal from the United States District Court for the District of Nebraska (Neb.)	decree affirmed
Lucas v. American Code Company, Inc.	280 U.S. 445 (1930)	Brandeis	9–0	none	none	certiorari to the United States Court of Appeals for the Second Circuit (2d Cir.)	judgment reversed
Florsheim Brothers Drygoods Company, Ltd. v. United States	280 U.S. 453 (1930)	Brandeis	9–0	none	none	certiorari to the United States Court of Appeals for the Fifth Circuit (2d Cir.) and the United States Court of Appeals for the First Circuit (1st Cir.)	judgment in one case affirmed; judgment in one case reversed
Piedmont and Northern Railway Company v. United States	280 U.S. 469 (1930)	Brandeis	9–0	none	none	appeal from the United States District Court for the Western District of South Carolina (W.D.S.C.)	decree reversed, with direction to dismiss the bill for want of jurisdiction
United States v. Guarantee Trust Company of New York	280 U.S. 478 (1930)	Brandeis	9–0	none	none	certiorari to the United States Court of Appeals for the Eighth Circuit (8th Cir.)	decree affirmed
New York Central Railroad Company v. Ambrose	280 U.S. 486 (1930)	Sutherland	9–0	none	none	certiorari to the Circuit Court of Hudson County (New Jersey)	judgment reversed
Baltimore and Ohio Southwestern Railroad v. Carroll	280 U.S. 491 (1930)	Sutherland	9–0	none	none	certiorari to the Indiana Supreme Court (Ind.)	judgment reversed
Early v. Richardson	280 U.S. 496 (1930)	Sutherland	9–0	none	none	certified question from the United States Court of Appeals for the Fourth Circuit (4th Cir.)	certified question answered
White v. Sparkill Realty Corporation	280 U.S. 500 (1930)	Sutherland	9–0	none	none	appeal from the United States District Court for the Southern District of New York (S.D.N.Y.)	decree reversed, and cause remanded

[a] Butler took no part in the case
[b] Stone took no part in the case
