= Louis Kleberg =

German Texan soldier (1802-1847)

Louis Kleberg (May 1, 1802– July 1, 1847) was a German Texan soldier in the Texas Revolution and a member of the frontier forces.

== Biography ==
Kleberg was born in Herstelle, Westphalia. In 1834, with the Roeder party, he immigrated to Texas. Kleberg was the older brother of Robert J. Kleberg. He fought at the Siege of Bexar in Captain Thomas F. L. Parrott's company. In 1839 he served in Captain John Bird's company, defending against the Native Americans. Kleberg is buried in a small cemetery on private property.

== Sources ==
- John Henry Brown, Indian Wars and Pioneers of Texas, 1880
