= KLOT-LP =

Radio station in Cat Spring, Texas, United States

- Cat Spring, Texas; United States
- Broadcast area: Austin County, Texas
- Frequency: 107.7 MHz
- Branding: KLOT 107.7 LP

Programming
- Format: Community radio and full-service

Ownership
- Owner: Austin County Community Communications

History
- First air date: December 8, 2016

Technical information
- Licensing authority: FCC
- Facility ID: 194652
- Class: D
- ERP: 58 watts
- HAAT: 39.2 meters (129 ft)
- Transmitter coordinates: 29°51′49″N 96°20′3″W

Links
- Public license information: LMS
- Website: klotradio.org

KLOT-LP (107.7 FM) is a terrestrial American low power radio station, licensed to Cat Spring, Austin County, Texas, United States, and is owned by the Austin County Community Communications of Cat Spring.

== History ==
KLOT-LP was issued an initial construction permit to build a 58 watt, Class L1 (low power) community station near Farm to Market Road 1094 and Mill Creek Road in Austin County, north of the town of Cat Spring. The construction permit was assigned the callsign KLOT-LP on September 18, 2014.

The facility received its initial License to Cover on December 8, 2016.

KLOT-LP programming focuses on Austin County, serving towns such as Bellville, Sealy, and Cat Spring.

The facility was taken silent, through Special Temporary Authority, granted by the Federal Communications Commission, February 1, 2017, as the Licensee had received the original transmitter and antenna on loan. The owner of the loaned equipment rescinded the loan and demanded immediate return of the equipment. As a result, the board of Austin County Community Communications obtained broadcasting equipment and install the equipment at the tower site. The work was completed, and the facility returned to broadcasting on July 5, 2017. A Resumption of Operations was granted by the Commission on January 8, 2018.
