= Rosa von Roeder Kleberg =

German-American pioneer

- Born: Sophie Caroline Luise Rosalie von Roeder; July 20, 1813; Vörden, Kingdom of Westphalia
- Died: July 3, 1907 (aged 93); Yorktown, Texas, U.S.
- Spouse: Robert J. Kleberg
- Children: 8 (including Robert, Rudolph, and Marcellus)
- Parent(s): Ludwig von Roeder (father); Caroline Sack (mother)

Philippine Sophie Caroline Luise Rosalie von Roeder Kleberg (July 20, 1813 – July 3, 1907) was a German Texan noblewoman and pioneer.

== Early life and family ==
Von Roeder Kleberg was born on July 20, 1813 in Vörden in the German Kingdom of Westphalia. A member of a minor noble family, she was one of eleven children of Lieutenant Ludwig Siegismund Anton von Roeder and Caroline Luise Sack. She likely grew up at the family's estate in Marienmünster, where she studied piano and embroidery.

== Marriage and children ==
She met Robert J. Kleberg through her brother, who was his colleague at Georg August University. She agreed to marry Kleberg if he emigrated to Texas with her family. They were married on September 4, 1834 in Germany. They had eight children, including Robert J. Kleberg Jr., Marcellus Kleberg, and Rudolph Kleberg.

== Emigration to Texas ==
Facing a period of financial strain, the von Roeder family emigrated to the Republic of Texas, having received letters from German Texan settler Johann Friedrich Ernst encouraging them to do so.

She left Germany with several others in the family's second expedition, setting sail for America on September 30, 1834. The first landed in New Orleans before setting sail for Brazoria. On December 22, 1834, they shipwrecked on Galveston Island.

Shortly after her arrival in Cat Spring, Texas, the Texas Revolution began. Two of her brothers, Albrecht and Louis, joined the army and fought in the Siege of Béxar. Her husband joined Louis to fight at the Battle of San Jacinto, at which time she fled with her infant child and other relatives in the Runaway Scrape. Her home was burned down by the Mexicans.

She and her husband rebuilt and she began farming their land, raising chickens and planting crops. As the number of German emigrants to Texas increased, von Roeder Kledberg opened up her home to travelers and those who were sick or dying. She hosted Prince Carl of Solms-Braunfels during this time.

In 1847, the Kledberg family moved to Meyersville.

== Death ==
Von Roeder Kledberg died on July 3, 1907 in Yorktown, Texas.
