= Rudolph Kleberg =

American politician (1847–1924)

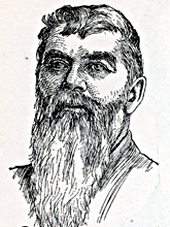
- Rudolph Kleberg, U.S. Representative from Texas

Member of the U.S. House of Representatives from Texas's 11th district
- In office April 7, 1896 – March 3, 1903
- Preceded by: William H. Crain
- Succeeded by: Robert Lee Henry

Personal details
- Born: June 26, 1847 Cat Spring, Texas, U.S.
- Died: December 28, 1924 (aged 77) Austin, Texas, U.S.
- Resting place: Oakwood Cemetery
- Party: Democratic
- Parent(s): Robert J. Kleberg (father); Rosalie von Roeder (mother)

Rudolph Kleberg (June 26, 1847 – December 28, 1924) was a U.S. representative from Texas, great uncle of Robert C. Eckhardt and uncle of Richard M. Kleberg, Sr.

== Early life and education ==
Born in Cat Spring, Texas to Robert J. Kleberg and Rosa von Roeder Kleberg, Kleberg was instructed by private tutors and graduated from Concrete College, De Witt County, in 1868. He enlisted in Tom Green's brigade of Cavalry in the Confederate States Army in the spring of 1864 and served until the close of the Civil War.

After the war, Kleberg studied law in San Antonio. He was admitted to the bar in 1872.

== Career ==
Kleberg commenced practice in Cuero, Texas. The next year, he founded the Cuero Star in 1873. After a few years of practice, Kleberg was appointed as prosecuting attorney of De Witt County 1876-1890.

Entering electoral politics, he served as a member of the State senate 1882-1886. In 1885, he was appointed as United States attorney for the western district of Texas.

Kleberg was elected as a Democrat to the Fifty-fourth Congress to fill the vacancy caused by the death of William H. Crain. He was reelected to the Fifty-fifth, Fifty-sixth, and Fifty-seventh Congresses and served from April 7, 1896, to March 3, 1903.

He was not a candidate for renomination in 1902. Resuming the practice of law, he moved with his family to Austin, Texas, in 1905. There he was appointed as the official reporter for the court of criminal appeals February 24, 1905.

He served until his death in Austin on December 28, 1924. He was interred in Oakwood Cemetery.

== Sources ==
- United States Congress. "Rudolph Kleberg (id: K000258)". Biographical Directory of the United States Congress.

U.S. House of Representatives
Preceded by William H. Crain	Member of the U.S. House of Representatives from Texas's 11th congressional district April 7, 1896 – March 3, 1903	Succeeded by Robert Lee Henry
