= Herstelle =

- Village
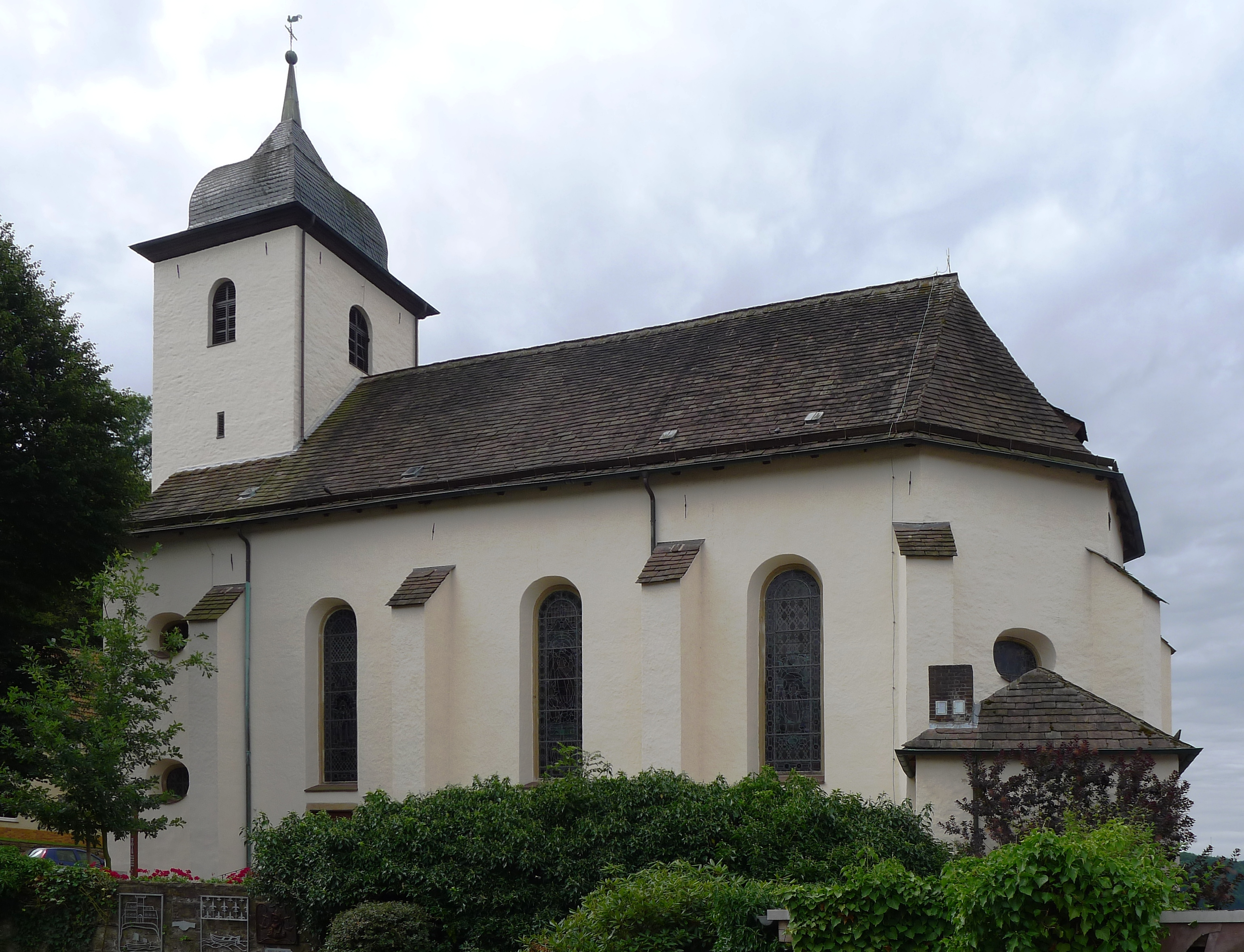
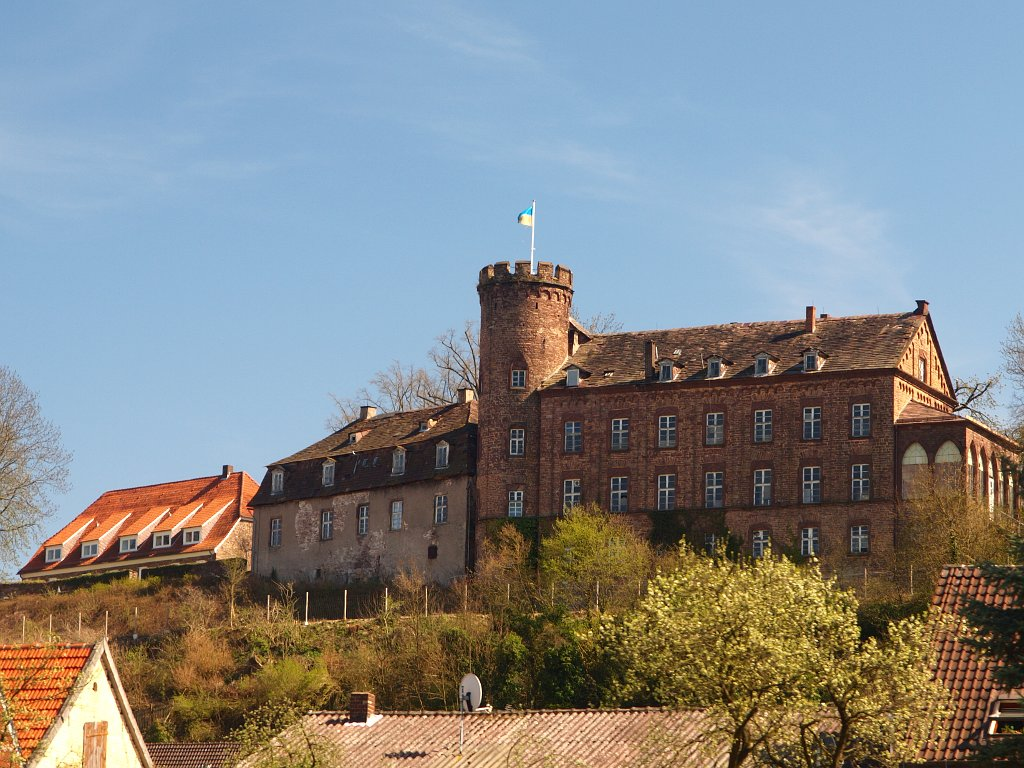
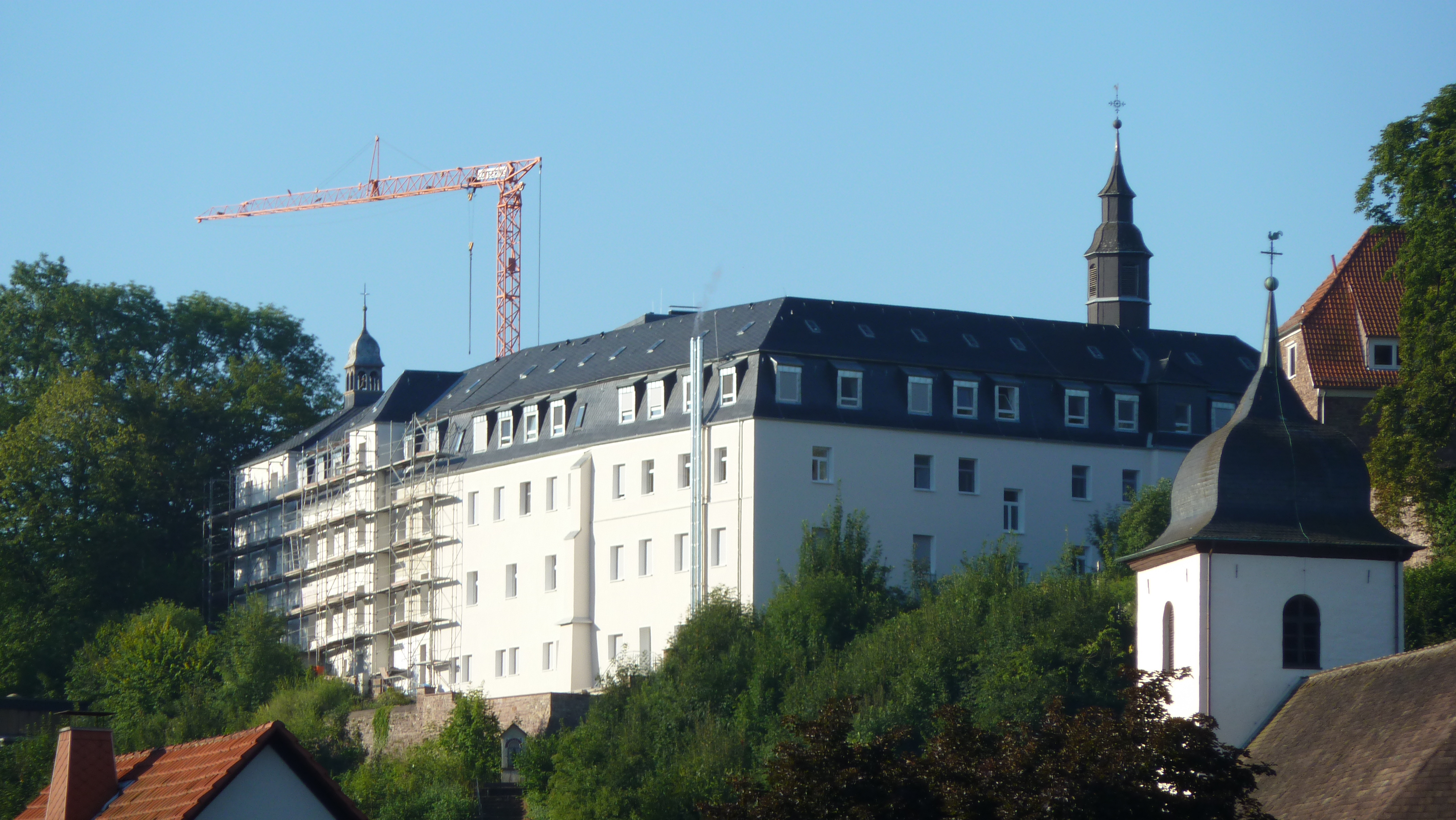
- Herstelle from the view of the Weser Church of St. Bartholomew Herstelle Castle Herstelle (left) and Würgassen (right) Herstelle Abbey
- Interactive map of Herstelle
- Location within Germany Location within Europe
- Coordinates: 51°38′21″N 9°24′50″E
- Sovereign state: Germany
- State: North Rhine-Westphalia
- District: Höxter
- Municipality: Beverungen
- Settled by Charlemagne: 797; 1229 years ago, as Heristelli

Area
  - Total: 7.014 km^{2} (2.708 sq mi)

Population (2025)
  - Total: 914
  - Density: 130/km^{2} (338/sq mi)
- Time zone: UTC+01:00 (CET)
  - Summer (DST): UTC+02:00 (CEST)
- Postal code: 37688
- Area code: 05273
- Website: beverungen.de

Herstelle (German pronunciation: [ˈheːɐ̯ˌʃtɛlə]) is a village and locality (Ortschaft) of Beverungen, located on the left bank of the Weser in North Rhine-Westphalia, Germany.

== Etymology ==
Herstelle is believed to be named after the ancestral seat of Charlemagne's noble house, the city of Herstal; appearing as "Haristallio Novo" or variations thereof in several different annals.

== History ==
=== Early Middle Ages ===
In the middle of November of 797, King Charlemagne departed from the city of Aachen and made his way into Saxony. He set up his camp on the side of the Weser, and gave it the name Heristelli. Charlemagne celebrated both Christmas and Easter at Heristelli and received a small number of envoys there, including one from the Avars.

In the spring of 798, the Saxons from beyond the Elbe murdered some royal officials that had been sent to Charlemagne, as well as a royal envoy of the Danish King Sigfred. Following this attack, Charlemagne leaves Heristelli and travels north to Minden. There, he crosses the Weser and sets out on a military campaign that takes him as far as the Elbe. After the successful conclusion of this campaign, Charlemagne returns to Aachen.

=== High Middle Ages ===
In the 11th century, Herstelle appears to have been a farming settlement, with at least one fishery. It had five "Vorwerk" (farmsteads or manorial buildings) belonging to it: Wergis, Thesle, Brecal, Heinriadassen, and Buffesen. It has been documented in numerous property transactions with the Church of Paderborn. The Bishop of Paderborn, Evergis, is stated to have had an estate there in the 12th century. By 1171, there was also a documented church in Herstelle.

== Administration ==
Herstelle is governed by the municipality of Beverungen. It does however have a district committee consisting of seven members. Of those seven members, three are members of the municipal council of Stadt Beverungen and four are knowledgeable citizens of Herstelle.

The district committee is authorised to make decisions on a variety of matters, including: the advancement, design, and management of public recreational areas (playgrounds, sports facilities, youth centres, etc), and the maintenance and design of cemeteries. Whenever possible, the committee is also supposed to be consulted on certain matters pertaining to the locality. This includes things like: the management and maintenance of municipal land within the locality, and the appointment of the conciliator (Schiedsmann) and their deputy.

== Geography ==
=== Topography ===
Herstelle lies in the river valley of the Weser at approximately 101 metres above sealevel, with the surrounding terrain rising around 200 metres to the south-west at Haarbruck, and around 400 metres to the north-east at Solling.
