= Robert J. Kleberg =

American pioneer (1803–1888)

- Born: September 10, 1803; Herstelle, Kingdom of Westphalia
- Died: October 30, 1888 (aged 85); Texas, U.S.
- Spouse: Rosa von Roeder
- Children: Robert, Rudolph, and Marcellus
- Relatives: Louis Kleberg (brother)

Robert Justus Kleberg (September 10, 1803 – October 30, 1888), christened Johan Christian Justus Robert Kleberg, was a German Texan from Herstelle, Westphalia, then part of the Kingdom of Prussia. He was a veteran of the Battle of San Jacinto and the brother of Louis Kleberg. He arrived in Texas in 1836 with his wife Philippine Sophie Rosalie "Rosa" von Roeder, who was member of the aristocratic von Roeder family, which was allied with the wealthy and aristocratic Sack family of Nordrhein Westphalia. Robert and Rosa had eleven children, seven of whom lived to adulthood; Clara, Johanna, Caroline, Rudolph, Marcellus, and Robert II (commonly known simply as Robert).

He is the namesake of Kleberg County, Texas. His sons also achieved success. Rudolph Kleberg (1847-1924) became a United States congressman, Marcellus Kleberg (1849-1913) studied law and served as city attorney for Galveston, Texas, and the youngest Kleberg son, also named Robert Justus Kleberg (1853-1932), managed the King Ranch and later married Alice Gertrudis King, the youngest daughter of cattle baron Captain Richard King.

== Sources ==
- John Henry Brown, Indian Wars and Pioneers of Texas, 1880
- Kleberg, Rosa (April 1898). "Some of My Earlier Experiences in Texas". The Southwestern Historical Quarterly. 1 (4): 297–303.
- Kleberg, Robert Justus at Handbook of Texas Online
- The First German Settlement in Texas at Handbook of Texas Online
