= Richard M. Kleberg =

American politician (1887–1955)

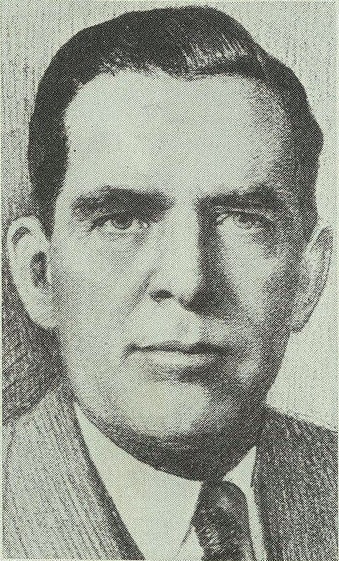

Member of the U.S. House of Representatives from Texas's 14th district
- In office November 24, 1931 – January 3, 1945
- Preceded by: Harry M. Wurzbach
- Succeeded by: John E. Lyle Jr.

Texas State Game and Fish Commission
- In office 1951–1955

Personal details
- Born: Richard Mifflin Kleberg; November 18, 1887 near Kingsville, Texas, U.S.
- Died: May 8, 1955 (aged 67) Hot Springs, Arkansas, U.S.
- Resting place: Chamberlain Burial Park, Kingsville, Tex.
- Party: Democratic
- Relations: Alice Gertrudis King and Robert Justus Kleberg, parents; Rep. Robert C. Eckhardt, 2nd cousin
- Education: Corpus Christi High School (1905); University of Texas at Austin (1911)
- Profession: Lawyer (admitted to the bar 1909)

Richard Mifflin Kleberg Sr. (November 18, 1887 – May 8, 1955) was an American politician who was a seven-term member of the United States House of Representatives from Texas's 14th congressional district over the period 1931–1945 and an heir to the King Ranch in South Texas. He was a Democrat.

Kleberg was first elected in 1931 in a special election to succeed the late Harry M. Wurzbach. His election caused the Democratic party to achieve a majority in the House of Representatives, which it retained for all but four of the next sixty-three years. He was elected unopposed in 1940 and 1942. Lyndon B. Johnson served as a congressional secretary under Kleberg from 1931 until his appointment as head of the Texas National Youth Administration in 1935.

As described by Johnson biographer Robert Caro, Kleberg was a staunch conservative, and initially took a dim view of President Franklin D. Roosevelt and the New Deal. Nevertheless, he was persuaded by Lyndon Johnson to vote for certain key New Deal policies that he personally opposed when it was brought to his attention that they enjoyed significant support among his constituents.

He was defeated for renomination in 1944 by John E. Lyle, Jr., who was elected unopposed that November. Kleberg died in 1955 at age 67.

He was a member of the Miller group in Washington.

== See also ==
- Texas's congressional delegations

U.S. House of Representatives
Preceded by Harry M. Wurzbach	Member of the U.S. House of Representatives from Texas's 14th congressional district 1931–1945	Succeeded by John E. Lyle Jr.
