= Texas barrier islands =

American islands in the Gulf of Mexico

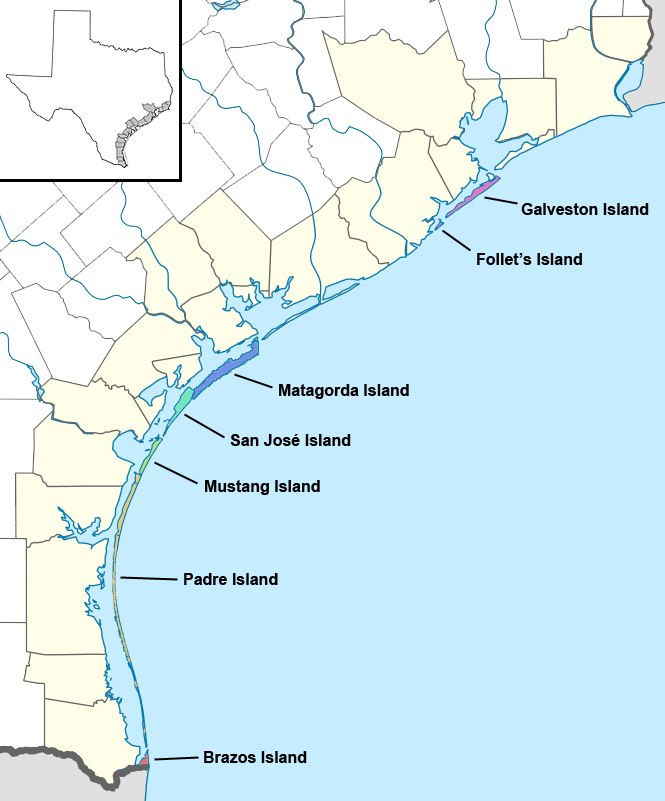
- Map of the barrier islands along the Gulf Coast of Texas

Geography
- Location: Gulf of Mexico
- Coordinates: 28°N 97°W
- Total islands: 7
- Major islands: Galveston Island, Follet's Island, Matagorda Island, San José Island, Mustang Island, Padre Island, Brazos Island

Administration
- United States
- State: Texas

The Texas barrier islands are a chain of barrier islands in the Gulf of Mexico along the Texas Gulf Coast. The islands enclose a series of estuaries along the Texas coast and attract tourists for activities such as recreational fishing and dolphin watching. The seven barrier islands, listed from northeast to southwest, are Galveston Island, Follet's Island, Matagorda Island, San José Island, Mustang Island, Padre Island, and Brazos Island.

Padre Island is the world's largest barrier island, with a length of 113 miles (182 km). Since 1962 Padre Island has been divided in two by the dredging of the Port Mansfield Channel roughly 30 miles (48 km) north of the south end of the island, which separated it into portions referred to as South Padre Island and North Padre Island.

== List of islands ==
Latitude	Name	Length	Estuary	Map
29°13' N	Galveston Island	27 miles (43 km)	Trinity–San Jacinto Estuary (Galveston Bay)	Galveston Island
29°2' N	Follet's Island	13 miles (21 km)	Christmas Bay Estuary	Follet's Island
28°14' N	Matagorda Island	38 miles (61 km)	Guadalupe Estuary (San Antonio Bay)	Matagorda Island
27°59' N	San José Island	21 miles (34 km)	Mission–Aransas Estuary (Aransas Bay)	San José Island
27°44' N	Mustang Island	18 miles (29 km)	Nueces Estuary (Corpus Christi Bay)	Mustang Island
26°50' N	Padre Island	113 miles (182 km)	Laguna Madre Estuary	Padre Island
26°2' N	Brazos Island	4.0 miles (6.4 km)	Laguna Madre Estuary	Brazos Island
