= Boca Chica (Texas) =

Area on the Rio Grande River Delta

- Location within Texas
- Location: Cameron County, Texas, United States
- Nearest city: Brownsville
- Coordinates: 25°59′49″N 97°9′6″W

Boca Chica is an area on the eastern portion of a subdelta peninsula of Cameron County, at the far south of the US state of Texas along the Gulf Coast. It is bordered by the Brownsville Ship Channel to the north, the Rio Grande and Mexico to the south, and the Gulf of Mexico to the east. The area extends about 25 miles (40 km) east of the city of Brownsville. The peninsula is served by Texas State Highway 4—also known as the Boca Chica Highway or Boca Chica Boulevard—which runs east–west, terminating at the Gulf and Boca Chica Beach.

The Boca Chica area has seen various developments over the course of its history. These include Mexican land grants, Mexican and American ranches, a battlefield of the American Civil War, a 1920s beach resort, and a state park (Boca Chica State Park); additionally, a small settlement named Boca Chica Village existed in the area from 1960 to 2024. The village and some of the surrounding area were incorporated as Starbase, Texas, a Type C City, in 2025. This followed the tremendous growth since 2018 as the area became more widely known due to being the site of SpaceX Starbase, a major facility of aerospace company SpaceX for the development, manufacturing and testing of its rockets. Starbase is the primary launch and recovery facility for SpaceX's Starship launch vehicle.

Boca Chica, meaning "small mouth" in Spanish, refers to the mouth of the Rio Grande. The name highlights the river's modest flow, which can diminish significantly during droughts, sometimes causing its mouth to disappear entirely.

== The making of the area of Boca Chica ==
Transportation across Boca Chica has been an important part of the history of the area. A land transportation route existed across Boca Chica in the 19th century, starting at the Mexican port of Brazos Santiago, north of Boca Chica, and heading inland to the Rio Grande Valley area that would later become Brownsville. The shallow-water sail port at Brazos Santiago was used by sailing ships that used Brazos Santiago Pass to enter the South Bay of Laguna Madre—a shallow, hypersaline, natural bay—from the Gulf to transit goods to the mainland north of the Rio Grande. Historical artifacts of human usage from those eras remained as of 2013 illustrating road use during the Mexican–American War (circa 1846) and railroad use during the American Civil War. Two historical artifacts. Cypress pilings from a circa 1846 floating bridge and the "Palmetto Pilings" from a circa-1865 railroad bridge were both yet extant in 2013. Both are located within 0.5 mi (0.80 km) of the beach near the eastern terminus of Texas State Highway 4.

In the late 19th century, much of the arable land on the subdelta peninsula of Boca Chica was used for ranching. Historical ranches include Tulosa Ranch, Palmito Ranch, White's Ranch, and Cobb's Ranch. No historical Native American usage is known, and consultation with a number of tribes in 2013 identified no verbal record of native use of the area.

In 1904, the St. Louis, Brownsville and Mexico Railway was completed to Brownsville, which "opened the area to northern farmers who began to come to the area at the turn of the 20th century. They cleared the land, built irrigation systems and roads, and introduced large-scale truck farming and citrus farming. The new farming endeavors began a new period of prosperity around Brownsville."

The availability of cheap land in the area created a strong interest in land speculation. Special trains were dispatched to bring land speculators to the area and by the early 1920s as many as 200 people a day were coming to see the land.

One of the more notable land speculation ventures was the construction of the Del Mar Resort on Boca Chica Beach. Advertised as being on the same latitude as Miami, the resort was built in the 1920s by Colonel Sam Robinson, who moved to the Rio Grande Valley in 1917. The resort had 20 daycabins available for rent, a bathhouse, and a ballroom. It was quite successful resort until 1933, when a hurricane destroyed most of the buildings. The remaining buildings were turned into a base for the US Coast Guard during World War II. As a result of the Great Depression and the hurricane damage, the owners of the property were not able to reopen the resort after the end of the war.

The devastating 1933 hurricane spurred the Works Progress Administration to take part in the dredging and construction of the Port of Brownsville, a venture that the city had been trying to complete since 1928. The port was officially opened in 1936.

During the years that the ship channel was under construction, a nationally known rocketplane entrepreneur, William Swan, disappeared over Boca Chica as he attempted a rocket-powered human flight in 1933. As part of a skydiving exhibition over the Del Mar Resort on Boca Chica, he jumped out of an airplane in "an attempted manned rocket backpack flight. He disappeared into the clouds and was never seen again." Swan had previously set records in 1931 with the first American rocket-powered aircraft flight over Atlantic City, New Jersey, and the "first air-launched rocketplane flight" in 1932.

The completion of the port and the dredging of the Brownsville Ship Channel created a new human-made northern boundary of the Boca Chica peninsula. It cut the peninsula off from any land transport routes except from Brownsville to the east, which was also the transportation railhead for Boca Chica to the rest of the country.

== American Civil War battlefield ==
The Battle of Palmito Ranch is considered by some as the final battle of the conclusion of the American Civil War. It was fought 12–13 May 1865, on the banks of the Rio Grande east of current Brownsville, Texas, and a few miles from the seaport of Los Brazos de Santiago.

Union and Confederate forces in southern Texas had been observing an unofficial truce since the beginning of 1865, but Union Colonel Theodore H. Barrett, newly assigned to command an all-black unit, and never having been in combat, ordered an attack on a Confederate camp near Fort Brown for unknown reasons. The Union attackers captured a few prisoners, but the following day, the attack was repulsed near Palmito Ranch by Colonel John Salmon Ford, and the battle resulted in a Union defeat. Union forces were surprised by artillery, said to have been supplied by the French Army occupying the nearby Mexican town of Matamoros.

== Boca Chica Beach ==
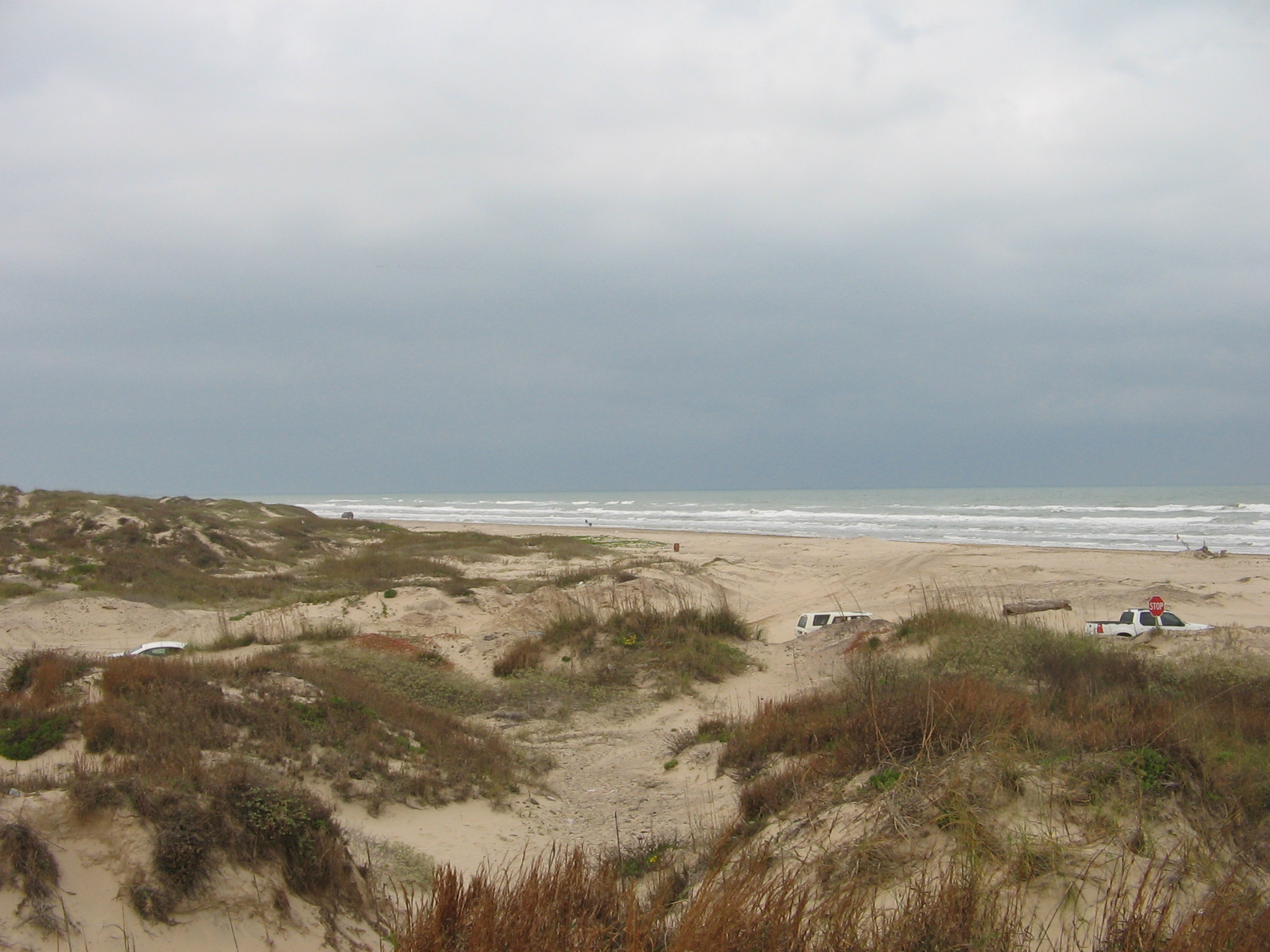
Dunes at Boca Chica

Boca Chica Beach adjoins the 11,950-acre Boca Chica tract (formerly known as Playa del Rio) of the Lower Rio Grande Valley National Wildlife Refuge. The beach is part of a 1,292-acre Texas state park located in the Boca Chica Subdelta separated from Mexico by the Rio Grande. The park was acquired by the state of Texas and opened in May 1994. The state park land is currently managed by the US federal government as part of the Lower Rio Grande Valley National Wildlife Refuge.

The portion of the beach north of the current Texas State Highway 4—on what was historically Brazos Island, but is now connected to the mainland—was known as Del Mar Beach prior to the second half of the 20th century. This area was the location of the successful Del Mar Resort in the 1920s and early 1930s, which had 20 daycabins for rent along with a bathhouse and a ballroom. Many of the resort buildings were destroyed by the 1933 hurricane. Although the owners partially rebuilt and continued to operate during the 1930s, the remaining buildings were turned into a base for the US Coast Guard during World War II. As a result of the Great Depression and hurricane damage, the owners did not reopen the resort after the end of the war.

An older map of Boca Chica shows the existence of a ship passage—Boca Chica Pass—from the Gulf into the South Bay of the Laguna Madre, several miles south of Brazos Santiago Pass, just north of the current SpaceX orbital launch site. This was from the time when Brazos Island, the duned area east of South Bay, was an island separated from the mainland. From 1846 to 1879, the King & Kennedy Steamboat service made calls at a landing in the South Bay. For sometime in the 1900s, a road bridge, called the Boca Chica Pass Bridge, went over the pass to connect the road from Brownsville to Brazos Island. Storm movement of sands and tidal flats, principally from the 1933 and 1967 hurricanes have closed off the pass and connected Brazos Island to the mainland, although water still exits the southeast end of South Bay and flows beside SH 4 into the Gulf under certain weather conditions, particularly extended days of southerly winds which build up the water level at the south end of the bay at high tide allowing limited flows of bay water back to the Gulf via the highway cut through the dunes.

== Boca Chica Village ==
Boca Chica Village was a small unincorporated community, as of 2025, located on Texas State Highway 4, about 22 mi (35 km) east of Brownsville. It was formed in 1967 under another name as a land development project, and a group of about 30 ranch-style houses was built before the settlement was devastated by Hurricane Beulah later that same year, which greatly affected the progress of the would-be town.

In 2014, the village and surrounding area were chosen by SpaceX as the location for the construction of a spaceflight build-and-launch facility. Much of the SpaceX build facility is located on land that was previously a part of Boca Chica Village, while the SpaceX test and orbital launch facilities are located two miles further east, adjacent to Boca Chica Beach.

== SpaceX Starbase ==
In 2012, SpaceX named the Boca Chica area as a possible location for the construction of their future private commercial launch site. In August 2014, SpaceX announced that they had selected the area as the location for their South Texas Launch Site, and that their "control center" would actually be on land within the Boca Chica Village, while the launch complex would be located two miles to the east. Limited construction began that year, but more extensive construction activities did not begin until approximately 2018. By May 2018, the site was expected to be used exclusively for launches of the SpaceX second-generation fully-reusable launch vehicle (which was eventually named SpaceX Starship in late 2018), and the launch complex was no longer planned to become a third launch site for Falcon 9 and Falcon Heavy.

Flight testing of the Starship second stage, with the newly designed Raptor rocket engine, began in 2019 and has continued into 2023. With the village only a few miles from the test site, in August 2019, Cameron County officials—following requirements set by the US regulatory authority, the FAA—began to request village residents to go outside their homes during any tests that involve loading of propellant fuel, due to perceived danger from shock-wave induced broken windows in the event of an explosion.

SpaceX made an initial orbital test flight of the entire two-stage Starship system in 2023. The first flight test flew on April 20, 2023, and ended after approximately two minutes when the Super Heavy booster lost control of its engines, while still over the designated flight test corridor. The second flight lifted off the pad on November 18, 2023, and successfully achieved stage separation, though both the booster and ship were terminated later in the flight.

== New city ==
As early as August 2020, SpaceX indicated it was looking to build a resort in South Texas with the intent to turn "Boca Chica into a '21st century Spaceport'".

In March 2021, SpaceX CEO Elon Musk more formally announced plans to incorporate a new city in the area of Boca Chica to be called "Starbase, Texas". Starbase would include the existing Boca Chica Village, the SpaceX test site and launch site, and some parts of the larger Boca Chica portion of the subdelta peninsula. Starbase is expected to include the land in Boca Chica Village proper—where both the legacy residential community and the SpaceX build site are located—as well as the land where the SpaceX test site and launch site is located, and more since Starbase is to be a municipality "much larger than Boca Chica."

By April 2021, SpaceX was referring to the area as "Starbase" on their test flight webcasts, and Musk was openly encouraging people to move to "Starbase". and projected that the population could grow by several thousand people in the next several years. Starbase had also become a common term for the area amongst SpaceX fans and followers.

In January 2024, Cameron County and Brownsville officials both passed resolutions requesting the federal government to officially recognise "Starbase" as a place name. In May 2024, Cameron County submitted a formal proposal to the U.S. Board on Geographic Names, which was publicly posted on their website in July 2024. However, at the May 2024 meeting of the Board's Domestic Names Committee, doubts were expressed over whether the proposed name violates the Board's policy against recognising names intended to promote a commercial enterprise. In October 2024, the Board was awaiting feedback on the proposal from the U.S. Fish and Wildlife Service and the Texas Geographic Names Committee.

On December 12, 2024, SpaceX sent a letter to county judge Eddie Treviño Jr. requesting an election to incorporate the city. The petition stated that nearly 500 people currently live in the area, and it proposed having SpaceX security manager Gunnar Milburn serve as its first mayor. On February 13, 2025, Treviño assessed that the basic requirements of a Type C municipality were met, and ordered an election on the incorporation petition on May 3. The election was approved by voters; it has become the first new city in Cameron County since the incorporation of Los Indios in 1995.

Bobby Peden, a SpaceX vice-president, was elected the first mayor of Starbase. Peden, along with two other residents with ties to SpaceX, ran unopposed; the two other residents will hold the respective commissioner seats.

== See also ==
- Bagdad, Tamaulipas — abandoned settlement across the border in Mexico
- Shifting Baselines - a 2025 documentary film about the Starbase project and its environmental and social impact on Boca Chica
