= Brazos Santiago Pass (Texas) =

Natural water inlet in Texas, United States

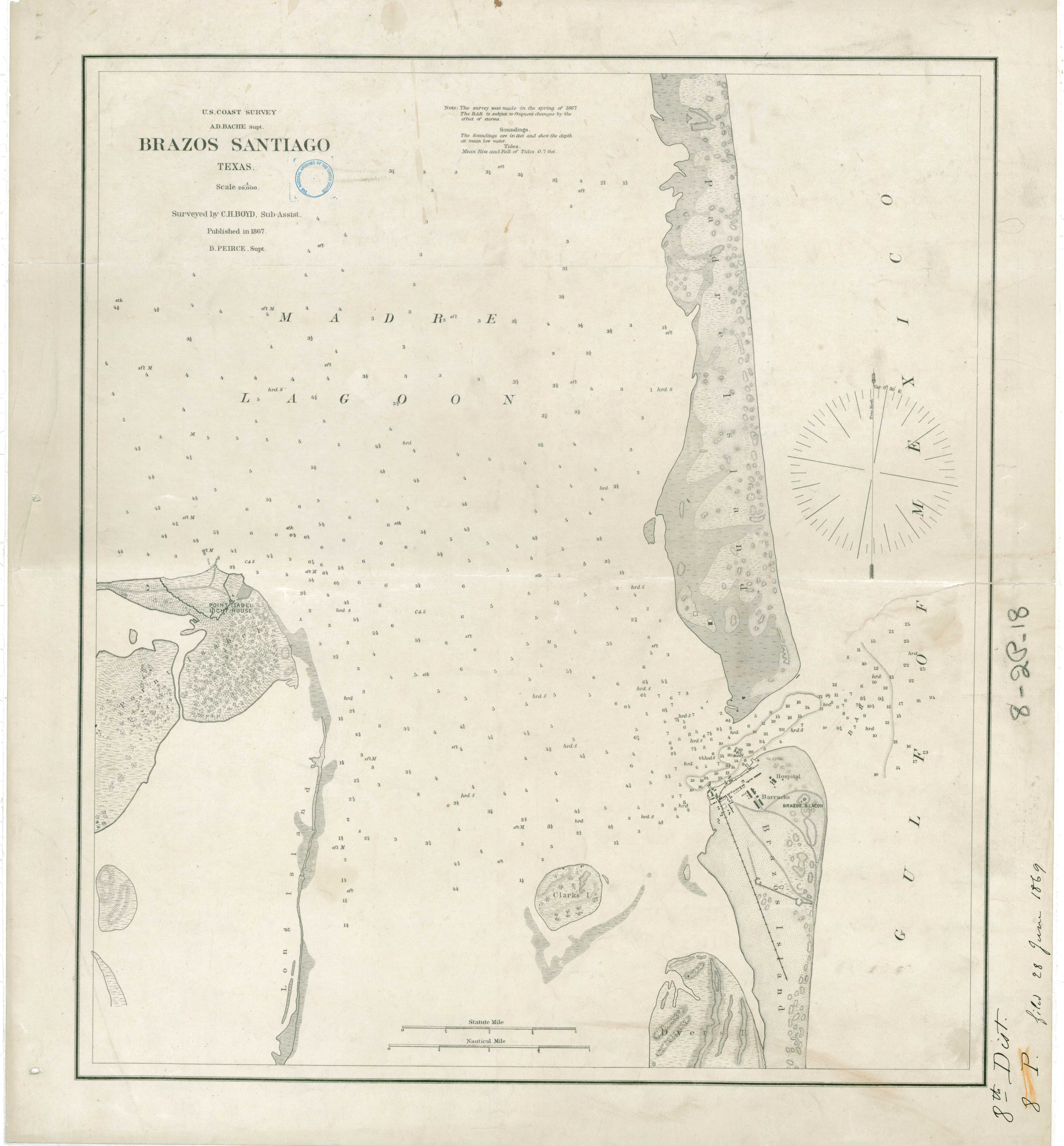
- Coast Survey of Brazos Santiago Pass ca. 1867

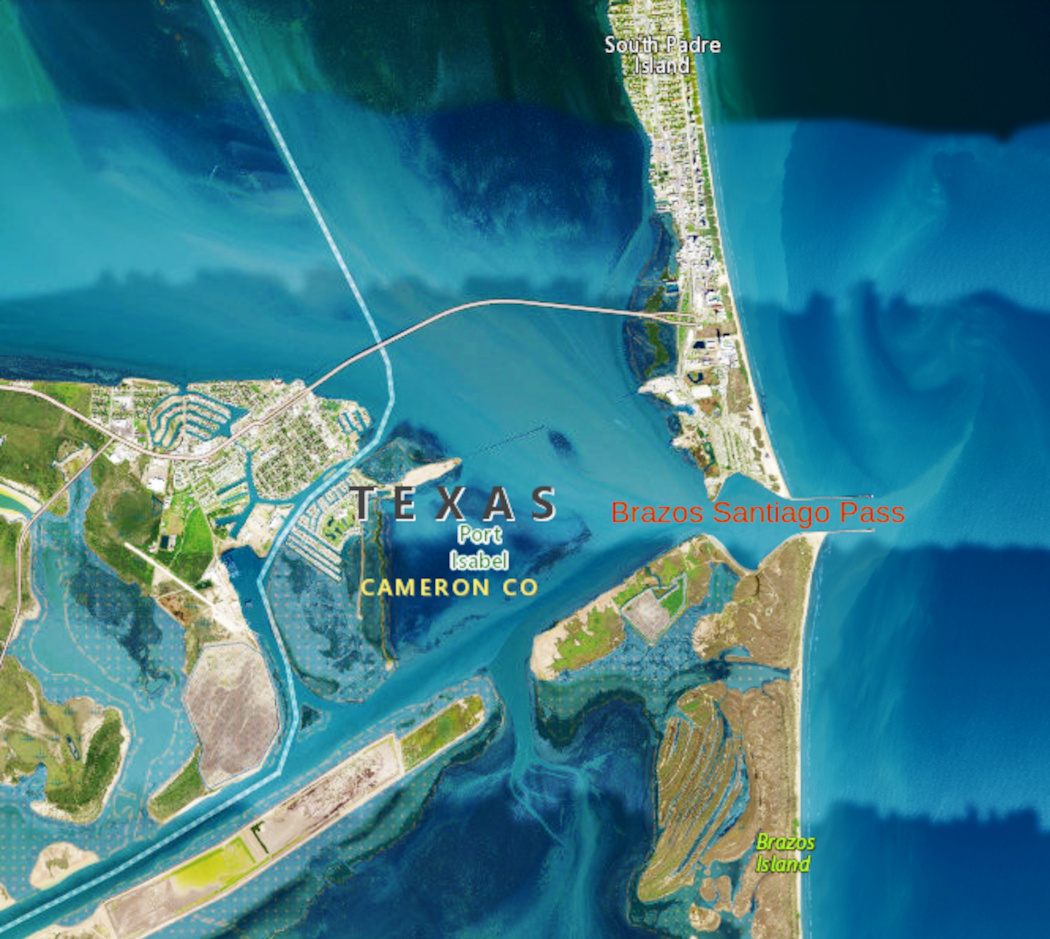
- Illustration of Brazos Santiago Pass

- Location on Texas Gulf Seacoast Brazos Santiago Pass (Texas) (the United States)
- Location: Brazos Island; Cameron County, Texas; Port Isabel; South Padre Island
- Country: United States
- Coordinates: 26.06563°N 97.15858°W

Specifications
- Length: 1.14 miles (1.83 km)
- NOAA NDBC: Brazos Santiago ~ BZST2

History
- Former names: Brazos Island Harbor Channel; Brownsville Channel; Port Isabel Channel
- Modern name: Brazos Santiago Inlet
- Current owner: State of Texas

Geography
- Direction: West
- Start point: Gulf of Mexico
- End point: Port Isabel
- Beginning coordinates: 26.06631°N 97.14496°W
- Ending coordinates: 26.06632°N 97.16395°W
- Branch: Laguna Madre
- Branch of: Lower Laguna Madre; Lower Rio Grande Valley
- Connects to: Boca Chica Pass; Gulf Intracoastal Waterway; Port of Brownsville; South Bay
- GNIS feature ID: 1372708

Brazos Santiago Pass is a natural coastal landform located in the Lower Laguna Madre and Lower Rio Grande Valley on the furthest southern beach terrain of the Texas Gulf Coast. The seacoast passage is interpolated by barrier islands encompassing the southern Brazos Island and the northern South Padre Island.

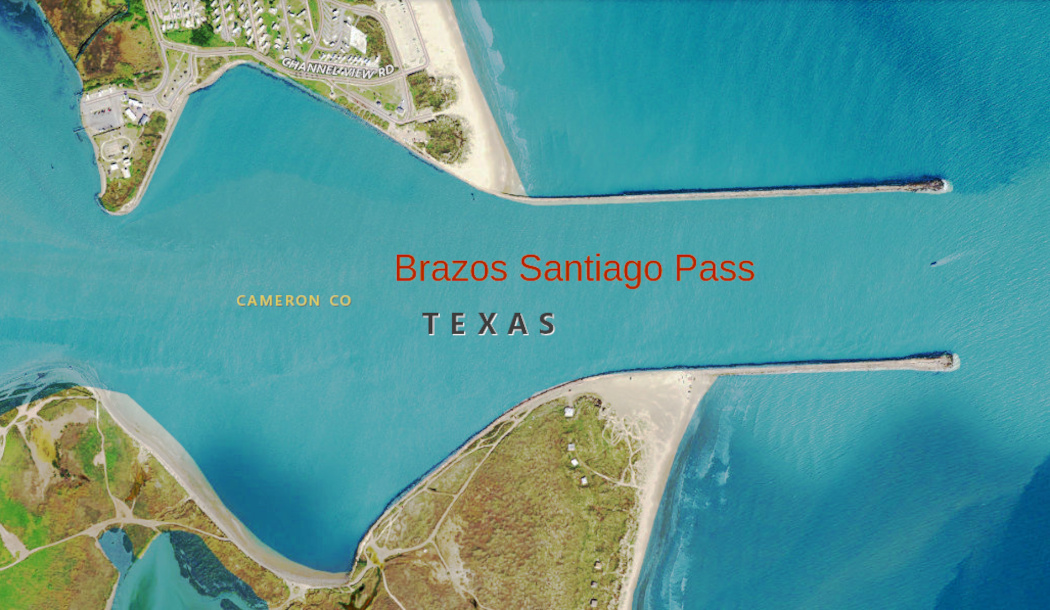
Jetties at Brazos Santiago Pass

The waterway inlet is a navigable strait spanning a water depth of 42 feet (13 m) and a waterway channel distance of 1.14 miles (1.83 km). The Brazos Santiago channel and seaward approach is defined by parallel jetties designed with a breakwater separation of .25 miles (0.40 km). The jetty harbor development sustains the passage entrance from coastal erosion, coastal sediment transport, longshore drift, and sandbank shoals. The South Padre Island jetty is .6 miles (0.97 km) from the Padre Island shoreline annexed by the Boca Chica jetty extending .3 miles (0.48 km) into the Brazos Island continental margin.

The natural ocean inlet has a shoreline distance on Brazos Island of 7.5 miles (12.1 km) to the Rio Grande often entitled as the Mexico–United States border.

== Navigation lights of Brazos Santiago pass ==
In 1850, the 31st United States Congress authorized the Lighthouse Service Act as enacted into law by 13th President of the United States Millard Fillmore on September 28, 1850. In 1851, the United States Lighthouse Board was convened as a quasi-military board fostering guardianship as applicable toterrestrial navigation services for maritime transport by the United States Lighthouse Service.

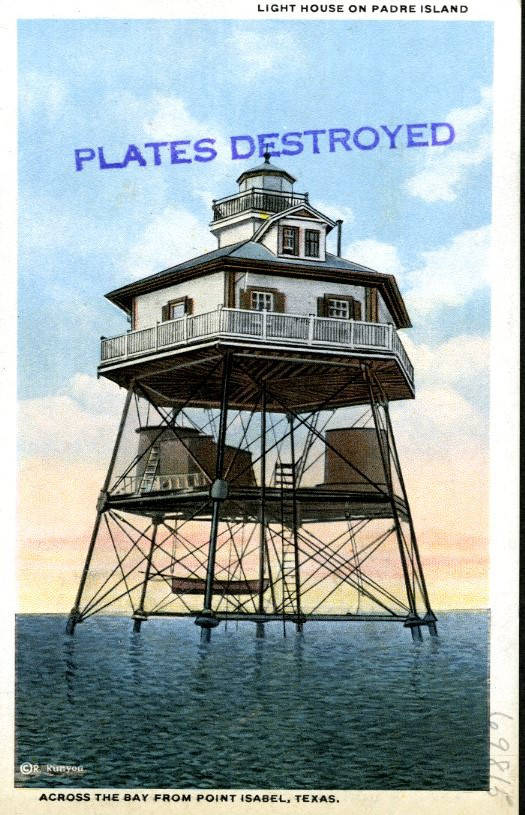
Screw-pile lighthouse in Laguna Madre

In 1853, a nautical beacon was initially established on South Padre Island with a proximity to the Brazos Island Military Depot originally entitled Fort Polk during the Mexican–American War. The navigation beacon had a 30 feet (9.1 m) vertical height situated on a square platform with a 15 feet (4.6 m) width. The structural design was constructed of wood equipped with a square copper lantern hoisted by block and tackle to the pinnacle. The beacon was visually completed with 5 feet (1.5 m) artillery wheels secured to a 19 feet (5.8 m) oak axletree for to and fro mobility on the barrier island coastline.

In 1879, a screw-pile lighthouse was established in the intertidal zone of the Lower Laguna Madre with a geographic proximity to the Brazos Santiago Pass. The deep foundation architecture was acknowledged as a notable landmark sight for sixty years within the Texas international boundary region of the Lower Rio Grande Valley coast. The foundation was developed with screw piles anchored into the estuarial seabed of the Lower Laguna Madre. The upper quarters were structured as a 1½ storey hexagonal Cape Cod style cottage built of timbers completed with a fourth-order fresnel lens located at the pinnacle.

The stilt structure had a visibility from the brackish water bearing 150 yards (140 m) from the South Padre Island shore and 750 yards (690 m) from the Brazos Santiago Pass.

Locale of Brazos Santiago Pass Screw-Pile Lighthouse
Brazos Santiago screw-pile lighthouse

== US coastal navigability development of Brazos Santiago pass ==
The Rivers and Harbors Act established a declaration of governance for the natural waterway of the Brazos Santiago Pass. The Act of Congress granted coastal engineering, coastal management, and public works projects for the natural inland waterway during the late nineteenth century to the twentieth century.

The Brazos Island and South Padre Island landform development proposals were endorsed by the United States Army Corps of Engineers sustaining the beach evolution at the Brazos Island Harbor natural inlet.

U.S. Statutes for Navigable Waterway Development at Brazos Santiago Pass

| Date of Enactment | Public Law | U.S. Statute | U.S. Statute Title |
| ◇ June 18, 1878 | P.L. 45-264 | 20 Stat. 152 | Rivers and Harbors Act of 1878 |
| ◇ June 14, 1880 | P.L. 46-211 | 21 Stat. 180 | Rivers and Harbors Act of 1880 |
| ◇ March 3, 1881 | P.L. 46-136 | 21 Stat. 468 | Rivers and Harbors Act of 1881 |
| ◇ Angust 2, 1882 | P.L. 47-375 | 22 Stat. 191 | Rivers and Harbors Act of 1882 |
| ◇ July 5, 1884 | P.L. 48-229 | 23 Stat. 133 | Rivers and Harbors Act of 1884 |
| ◇ August 5, 1886 | P.L. 49-929 | 24 Stat. 310 | Rivers and Harbors Act of 1886 |
| ◇ August 11, 1888 | P.L. 50-860 | 25 Stat. 400 | Rivers and Harbors Act of 1888 |
| ◇ August 18, 1894 | P.L. 53-299 | 28 Stat. 338 | Rivers and Harbors Act of 1894 |
| ◇ March 3, 1899 | P.L. 55-425 | 30 Stat. 1121 | Rivers and Harbors Act of 1899 |
| ◇ March 3, 1909 | P.L. 60-317 | 35 Stat. 815 | Rivers and Harbors Act of 1909 |
| ◇ July 25, 1912 | P.L. 62-241 | 37 Stat. 201 | Rivers and Harbors Act of 1912 |
| ◇ March 2, 1919 | P.L. 65-323 | 40 Stat. 1275 | Rivers and Harbors Act of 1919 |
| ◇ March 3, 1925 | P.L. 68-585 | 43 Stat. 1186 | Rivers and Harbors Act of 1925 |
| ◇ July 3, 1930 | P.L. 71-520 | 46 Stat. 918 | Rivers and Harbors Act of 1930 |
| ◇ August 30, 1935 | P.L. 74-409 | 49 Stat. 1028 | Rivers and Harbors Act of 1935 |
| ◇ March 2, 1945 | P.L. 79-14 | 59 Stat. 10 | Rivers and Harbors Act of 1945 |
| ◇ May 17, 1950 | P.L. 81-516 | 64 Stat. 163 | Rivers and Harbors Act of 1950 |
| ◇ July 14, 1960 | P.L. 86-645 | 74 Stat. 480 | Rivers and Harbors Act of 1960 |

=== Station Brazos and US Life Saving Service ===
In 1878, the United States Life Saving Service Act authorized the creation of a coastal life saving station near the navigable strait of the Brazos Island Harbor. The Station Brazos was constructed in 1881 and governed by the United States Life-Saving Service.

== Texas Historical Commission site ==
The Brazos Santiago Pass received a historical marker in 1996 by the Texas Historical Commission establishing a momentous narrative for the south Texas coastal dominion during the nineteenth century.

== See also ==
- Fort Brown
- Great Texas Coastal Birding Trail
- Ingham incident
- Laguna Atascosa National Wildlife Refuge
- Lower Rio Grande Valley National Wildlife Refuge
- Palo Alto Battlefield National Historical Park

== Marine archaeology bibliography ==
- Borgens, Amy A.; Hoyt, Steven D. "Chasing the Phantom Ship: Revisiting Interpretations of the Boca Chica No. 2 Shipwreck on the Texas Coast". Journal of Texas Archeology and History ~ Index of Texas Archaeology. Stephen F. Austin State University. doi:10.21112/ita.2018.1.32. Archived from the original on October 20, 2022.
- Borgens, Amy; Linden, Sarah (June 26, 2018). "Shoreline Shipwrecks: Exciting Discoveries!". Texas Historical Commission Marine Archeology Program. Texas Historical Commission.
- Marks, Michael (April 16, 2019). "As Nature Claims Shipwrecks, Historians Can Only Watch". Texas Standard ~ Moody College of Communication. University of Texas at Austin.
