= North Padre Island =

Barrier island in Texas, United States

Coordinates: 27.277°N 97.366°W

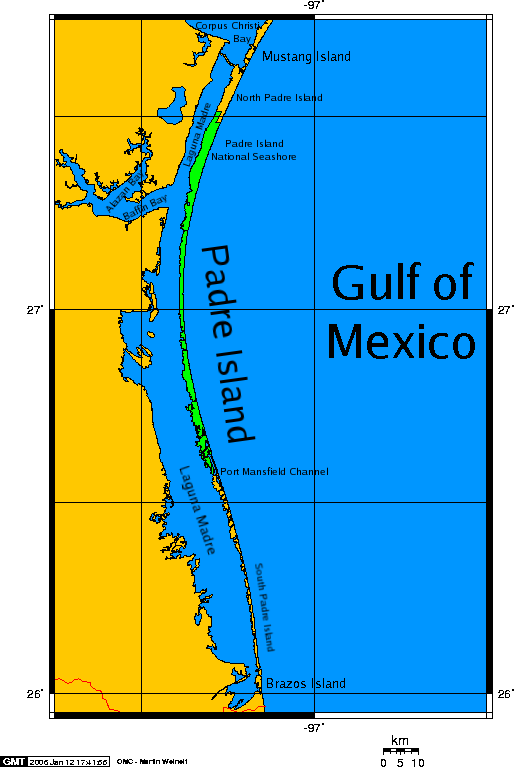
North Padre Island is located north of Padre Island

North Padre Island is a barrier island along the coast of Texas. It and South Padre Island were formed after the creation of the Port Mansfield Channel split Padre Island in two. From north to south, North Padre Island is located in parts of Nueces, Kleberg, Kenedy, and Willacy counties. The northernmost part of the island to the Kleberg County line is part of the city of Corpus Christi. Padre Island was once one island —today it is two and referred as North Padre Island, and South Padre Island. Padre Island National Seashore welcomed 674,704 visitors in 2020. Padre Island National Seashore, (PINS) is a national park that includes about 66 miles of undeveloped beaches and natural habitat. PINS is the longest stretch of undeveloped barrier island in the world. PINS is a nesting ground for the Kemp’s ridley sea turtle, the most endangered sea turtle species in the world, which nests on the beach from late April through mid-July. PINS is situated along the Central Flyway, Padre Island is a globally important area for over 380 migratory, overwintering, and resident bird species (nearly half of all bird species documented in North America). The national seashore is located on [North] Padre Island near the city of Corpus Christi, Texas. This national park is open 24 hours a day and seven days a week for visitors.

== Corpus Christi ==
The upper portion of North Padre Island is a district of the city of Corpus Christi. "The Island" as known by locals consists of high-income residential housing and condominiums and is a popular fishing destination. The Packery Channel, an inlet which connects the Gulf of Mexico to the Laguna Madre, separates North Padre Island from Mustang Island. There are numerous hotels located on North Padre Island, either along the beach or near the intersection of Texas Highway 361 and Texas Park Road 22, the district's two only main thoroughfares. Boating is also a popular activity on the island as the residential neighborhoods are connected by a series of canals which lead to the Gulf of Mexico.

== See also ==
- Padre Island
- South Padre Island
- Padre Island National Seashore
