= South Padre Island =

Barrier Island along the Gulf of Mexico

Coordinates: 26.264°N 97.189°W

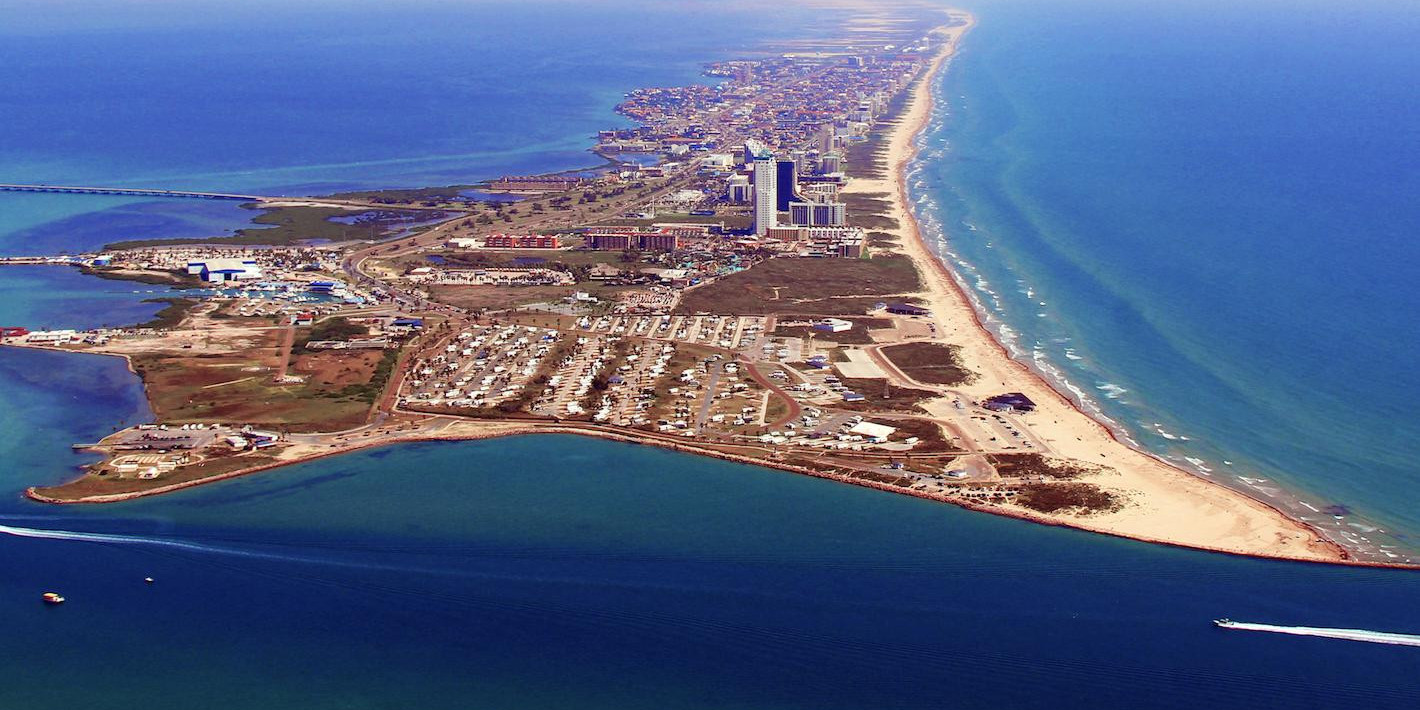
South Padre Island

South Padre Island is a barrier island located on the Gulf Coast of the U.S. state of Texas, located between the Laguna Madre (United States) and the Gulf of Mexico, it is the southernmost section of the Padre Island barrier island system. South Padre Island is not part of the Padre Island National Seashore. It is separated from the rest of Padre Island by the Port Mansfield Channel and is a popular destination known for its beaches, ecotourism, and resort development.

== History ==
=== Pre-Columbian period ===
Pre-Columbian archaeological records show that the area now known as South Padre Island was inhabited by humans as early as the 5th millennium BCE. The Karankawa, who later became the principal tribe along the Texas Gulf Coast, including seasonal camps on South Padre Island, are believed to have emerged as a distinct cultural group by around 1400 CE and persisted in the region until the 19th century.

The Karankawa people, a nomadic Indigenous group of the Gulf Coast, frequently visited South Padre Island and its Laguna Madre lagoons in seasonal bands of 30–40 individuals. They lived off coastal resources. Fishing with bows and arrows, hunting birds and turtles, and gathering shellfish in summer camps on the island, while spending winters in portable willow and hide lodges inland. Skilled navigators of shallow waters, they traveled in dugout canoes and adapted well to the barrier island environment. Although often described by early European observers as fierce and tall nomads, Spanish and American incursions, disease, and frontier violence decimated their numbers by the mid-19th century. Today their presence is confirmed through archaeological evidence via shell middens and ethnographic records.

=== Spanish exploration ===
In 1519, a Gulf Coast expedition commissioned by Governor Francisco de Garay of Jamaica, acting under the authority of the Spanish Crown, was led by Spanish explorer and cartographer Alonso Álvarez de Pineda. He is credited with mapping the Brazos Santiago Pass during the voyage. Pineda named it Brazos de Santiago, meaning "Arms of Saint James," a name that remains unchanged today.

=== Early 19th century and privateering (1800–1845) ===
During the early 19th century, the privateer Jean Lafitte and his crew from the infamous Barataria Bay conducted smuggling and privateering operations throughout the Gulf of Mexico, including areas along the South Texas coast such as the Laguna Madre, South Padre Island, and Port Isabel. Lafitte’s crew was notably diverse, including escaped slaves, free Black men, ex-naval officers, Creoles, and Anglo-Americans. Though considered pirates by the U.S. government, the Baratarians aided then-General Andrew Jackson in defending New Orleans during the War of 1812. In recognition of their assistance, Lafitte and several of his men were granted pardons and continued operating as privateers until the U.S. Navy expelled them from Barataria Bay in 1814.

According to local tradition, Lafitte dug a freshwater well near present-day Laguna Vista, Texas to supply his men. Today, “Lafitte’s Well” remains a marked local landmark within Laguna Vista.

Western settlement began in the early 19th century, when Padre José Nicolás Ballí established a cattle ranch on South Padre Island while also founding missions and Catholic churches throughout what is now mainland South Texas. He died in 1829. After the Mexican–American War, his heirs gradually lost control of the island. Subsequent settlers such as John Singer were expelled during the American Civil War due to their Union sympathies. After the war, the Singer family returned to the island but discovered that their home had been dismantled by Union forces for firewood, and a hurricane had since altered the landscape, erasing many landmarks.

== Modern era ==
Most of the island was closed by the National Park Service until 1962. After the area reopened to development, newcomers began to establish an economy on the island and in nearby Port Isabel. By 1978, the island had a population of around 314; a decade later, it had grown to 1,012 residents and supported 111 businesses. Being primarily coastal, the island's main source of income is tourism. Tens of thousands of college students visit during spring break, and in winter the island hosts "winter Texans"—typically retirees from colder states who stay during the milder season. Isla Blanca Park is a nature preserve and recreational area, which is located at the southern end of the island.

== Geology ==
South Padre Island began as a submerged sand bar about 4,500 to 5,000 years ago. Radiocarbon dating of shells indicates the emergent landmass likely developed later, possibly within the last 3,000–3,500 years.

South Padre Island is part of the geologically young Padre Island barrier system, which began forming during the early Holocene. It evolved from submerged sand shoals and bars, later enlarged by spit accretion and longshore sediment transport.

Its coastal geomorphology includes beach and dune systems composed primarily of well-sorted quartz and shell sand, coupled with coppice dune fields and vegetated barrier flats. Sediment minerals such as magnetite, garnet, quartz, zircon, and tourmaline trace their origins to rivers like the Rio Grande, Brazos, Colorado, and Mississippi.

The Laguna Madre, the lagoonal water body west of the island, is hypersaline and influences wind tidal flat development and hydrodynamics.

The remote landform is located in Cameron County and Willacy County, and is accessible by the Queen Isabella Causeway. The resort city of South Padre Island, a popular vacation destination, is located on the island.

== Wildlife of South Padre Island ==
Wildlife of South Padre Island

The wildlife of South Padre Island, a barrier island located on the Gulf Coast of Texas, is diverse due to its unique position between marine, coastal, and wetland ecosystems. The island supports a wide variety of animal species, including marine life, birds, mammals, reptiles, and invertebrates.

Marine Life

The surrounding waters of the Gulf of Mexico and Laguna Madre provide habitat for numerous aquatic species.

- Mammals: Bottlenose dolphins are commonly observed near the shoreline.
- Reptiles: Sea turtles, particularly the endangered Kemp’s ridley sea turtle, nest on local beaches.
- Fish: Common species include red drum (redfish), flounder, and spotted seatrout.
- Other marine animals: Rays, small sharks, shrimp, and crabs inhabit shallow and deeper waters.

Birds

South Padre Island lies along a major migratory route, making it a significant location for birdwatching.

- Water birds: Pelicans, herons, egrets, and seagulls are frequently seen.
- Wading birds: Roseate spoonbills are notable for their bright pink coloration.
- Birds of prey: Hawks and falcons are present, especially during migration seasons.

The South Padre Island Birding and Nature Center is a key site for observing bird species.

Terrestrial Mammals

Although limited by the island environment, several land mammals inhabit the area.

- Raccoons
- Coyotes
- Rabbits

These species are typically found in dune and brush habitats.

Reptiles and Amphibians

A variety of reptiles and amphibians can be found across the island’s habitats.

- Reptiles: Sea turtles, small snakes (generally non-venomous), and lizards
- Amphibians: Frogs and toads in freshwater or marshy areas

The Sea Turtle Inc. focuses on conservation and rehabilitation of sea turtles.

Invertebrates and Beach Fauna

The island’s beaches and tidal zones support numerous small organisms.

- Ghost crabs
- Sand dollars
- Mollusks such as clams

These species play an important role in the coastal ecosystem.

Conservation

Efforts are in place to protect wildlife on South Padre Island, particularly endangered species such as sea turtles. Local organizations and protected areas aim to preserve habitats and promote environmental awareness's.

== Plants of South Padre Island ==
Plants of South Padre Island

The plants of South Padre Island consists of salt-tolerant and drought-resistant plant species adapted to coastal environments. The island’s vegetation is shaped by sandy soils, high winds, salt spray, and limited freshwater availability. Plant life plays a critical role in stabilizing dunes, supporting wildlife, and maintaining the coastal ecosystem.

Coastal Dune Vegetation

Dune plants are essential for preventing erosion and maintaining the island’s structure.

- Sea oats (Uniola paniculata) – A dominant dune grass that stabilizes sand with deep root systems.
- Bitter panicum (Panicum amarum) – A hardy grass that thrives in shifting sands.
- Beach morning glory (Ipomoea imperati) – A creeping vine with white flowers that helps bind dunes together.

Salt Marsh and Wetland Plants

Wetland areas near the Laguna Madre support vegetation adapted to brackish and saline conditions.

- Smooth cordgrass (Spartina alterniflora) – Common in tidal marshes, providing habitat for marine life.
- Glasswort (Salicornia spp.) – A salt-tolerant succulent that thrives in high salinity.
- Saltwort (Batis maritima) – A low-growing plant common in coastal flats.

Shrubs and Coastal Brush

Shrub vegetation is found in more stable inland areas of the island.

- Sea oxeye daisy (Borrichia frutescens) – A yellow-flowering shrub tolerant of salt spray.
- Texas lantana (Lantana urticoides) – A hardy shrub that attracts pollinators.
- Prickly pear cactus (Opuntia spp.) – Stores water and thrives in dry, sandy soil.

Seagrasses (Marine Plants)

Underwater meadows in the Laguna Madre are dominated by seagrasses, which are vital to marine ecosystems.

- Shoal grass (Halodule wrightii) – Provides habitat for fish and invertebrates.
- Turtle grass (Thalassia testudinum) – A key food source for sea turtles.
- Manatee grass (Syringodium filiforme) – Found in deeper or calmer waters.

Ecological Importance

Plant species on South Padre Island are vital for:

- Stabilizing sand dunes and preventing erosion
- Providing habitat and food for wildlife
- Supporting marine ecosystems through seagrass beds
- Protecting inland areas from storm surge and wind damage

Conservation

Many plant species, particularly dune vegetation like Sea oats, are protected due to their ecological importance. Conservation efforts focus on limiting human disturbance, restoring native vegetation, and preserving natural habitats.

== See also ==
- Geography of Texas
- North Padre Island
- Padre Island National Seashore

== Sources ==
- Lonard, R.I.; Judd, F.W. (1981). The Terrestrial Flora of South Padre Island, Texas. Texas Memorial Museum, University of Texas at Austin.
- Judd, Frank W.; Summy, Kenneth R.; Lonard, Robert I.; Mazariegos, Ruben (2008). "Dune and Vegetation Stability at South Padre Island, Texas, United States of America". Journal of Coastal Research. 244: 992–998. doi:10.2112/07-0841.1. ISSN 0749-0208.
