= Padre Island National Seashore =

Protected area administered by the National Park Service

- IUCN category V (protected landscape/seascape)
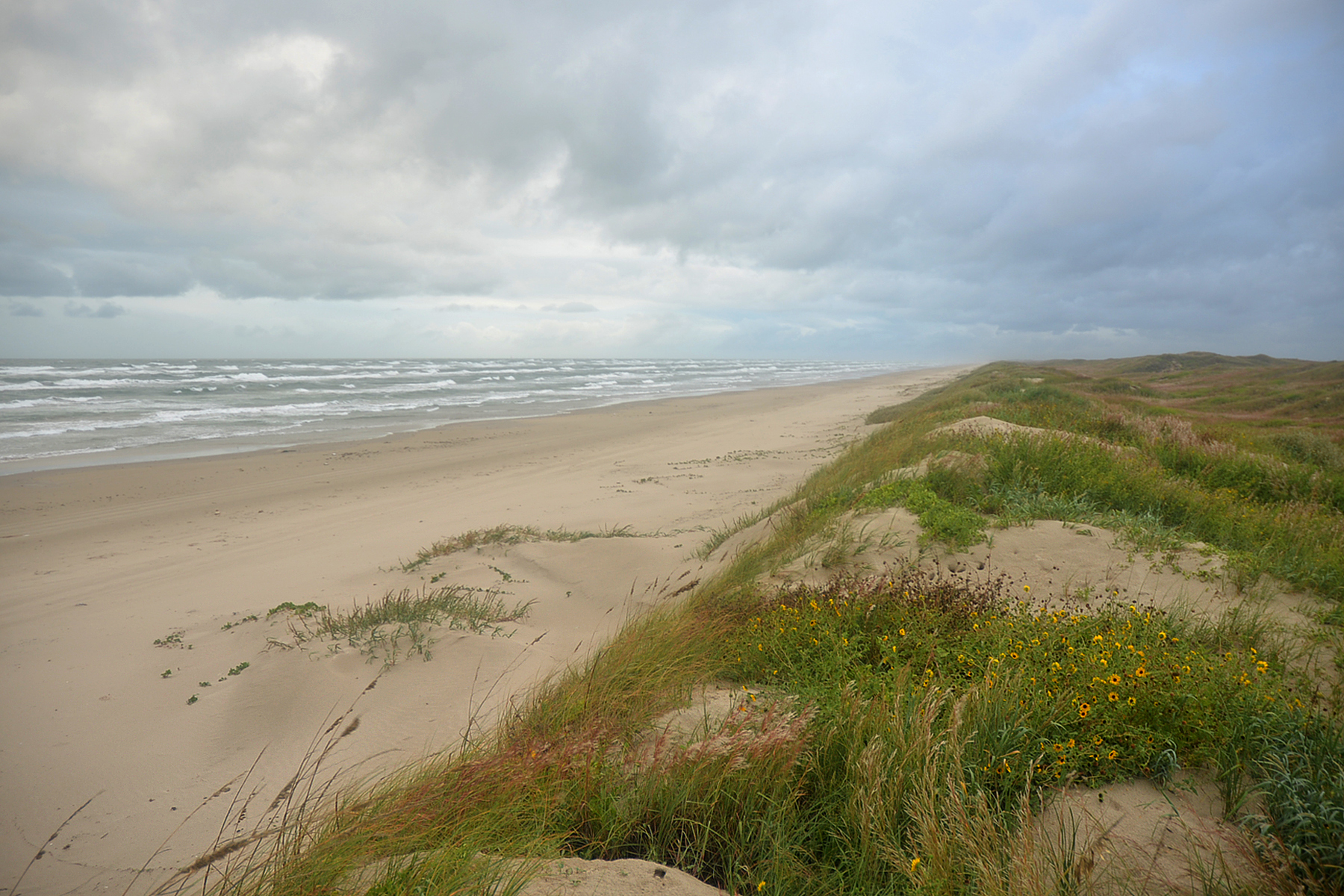
- View of the Gulf of Mexico and the dunes

- Location within Texas Location within the United States
- Location: Padre Island, Texas, United States
- Nearest city: Corpus Christi, Texas
- Coordinates: 26°59′04″N 97°22′50″W
- Area: 130,434 acres (527.85 km^{2})
- Established: September 28, 1962
- Visitors: 573,255 (in 2025)
- Governing body: National Park Service
- Website: Padre Island National Seashore

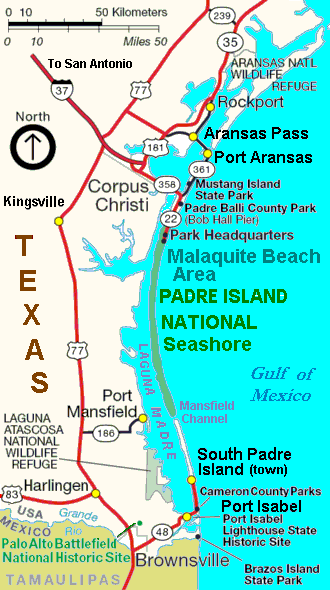
Map showing Padre Island National Seashore on Padre Island (center), south of Mustang Island.

Padre Island National Seashore (PINS) is a national seashore administered by the National Park Service, located on Padre Island off the coast of South Texas, USA. In contrast to South Padre Island, known for its beaches and vacationing college students, PINS is located on the north end of Padre Island and consists of a long beach where nature is preserved.

Most of the park is primitive, but camping is available, and most of the beach is only accessible to four-wheel-drive vehicles. All but four miles is open to vehicle traffic. PAIS is the fourth designated national seashore in the United States.

Padre Island is the longest undeveloped barrier island in the world. The national seashore is 70 miles (110 km) long with 65.5 miles (105.4 km) of Gulf beach. PAIS hosts a variety of pristine beach, dune, and tidal flat environments, including the Laguna Madre on its west coast, a famous spot for windsurfing. It is located in parts of Kleberg, Kenedy, and Willacy counties, with Kenedy County having the majority of its land area.

== Padre Island ==
Padre Island National Seashore is located on Padre Island, the largest of the Texas barrier islands and the world's longest barrier island. The island is located along Texas's southern coast of the Gulf of Mexico and is noted for its white sandy beaches. Meaning father in Spanish, it was named after Father José Nicolás Ballí (c.1770-1829), who owned the island and served as a missionary priest and collector of finances for all the churches in the Rio Grande Valley. He also founded the first mission in present-day Cameron County.

It is about 113 miles (182 km) long and 1.8 miles (3 km) wide, Padre Island is the second-largest island by area in the contiguous United States, after Long Island in New York on the Atlantic Coast.

== Geology ==
The geology of Padre Island National Seashore doesn't just belong within the park itself. PAIS is part of the world's longest natural barrier bar system. Padre Island is a very young geological feature that only developed merely 4,500 to 5,000 years ago, according to radio carbon dating of shells.

=== General physiography ===
Geologically extremely young, Padre Island is a vastly dynamic geologic feature. Unlike most of today's geologic features, such as the Grand Canyon, Padre Island changes constantly. Situated in a stable depository basin, there isn't much that can intervene with the barrier bars, except for the occasional hurricanes that come by. Most of Padre Island is less than 20 feet above mean sea level. Constant bombardment of prevailing southeasterly winds from the Gulf of Mexico heap beach of sand into high foredunes. In some places, the onshore wind may blow loose sand from the foredunes and beach across the flats beyond. Active sand dunes march across the island, smothering vegetation in their paths and leaving barren sandflats in their wakes. In other places, vegetation may win a battle of its own and stabilize the blowing sand by binding it with roots and vines. Slower daily movements of the sand and stabilizing effects of vegetation are interrupted occasionally by the brutal force of hurricane winds, waves, and tides. During storms, beaches are eroded, vegetation is ripped up, dunes are flattened, and channels are scoured across the island.

==== Laguna Madre ====
Laguna Madre, separating Padre Island from the Texas mainland, is locked in by the barrier island. Consequently, circulation of seawater in and out of the lagoon is highly restricted. The combination of a high rate of evaporation under the hot Texas sun and little mixing with either freshwater or normal seawater has made Laguna Madre extremely salty.

The maximum width of the lagoon is approximately 10 miles. In many places, however, lagoon width fluctuates considerably with the height of wind-generated tides. The lagoon is widest during highest wind tides, which produce maximum flooding of the vast tidal flats.

Like the island environments, the environments of Laguna Madre vary considerably. Within the national seashore, the northern part of the lagoon is occupied largely by grassflats having an average water depth of about 3 feet. These grassflats are environments of very high biologic activity, serving as spawning grounds for a number of fish, clams, and snails.

The shallowest parts of the lagoon lie in the central part of the national seashore. These areas are known as Middle Ground and the Land-Cut Area, where the Intracoastal Waterway was dredged through the rarely flooded wind-tidal flats (pl. I). The Hole, which lies between Middle Ground and the Land-Cut Area, is not really much of a hole; its average depths are only 1 to 2 feet. This "hole" is occupied mostly by flats supporting shoalgrass and algae. The deepest parts of the lagoon are south of the Land-Cut Area, where the muddy sand bottoms lie at depths as great as 8 feet.

Two small natural islands in Laguna Madre are unique environments within the national seashore. North and South Bird Islands, each a series of sand berms or ridges, have become important bird rookeries. Some of the man-made spoil islands along the Intracoastal Waterway are also nesting grounds for a variety of birds.

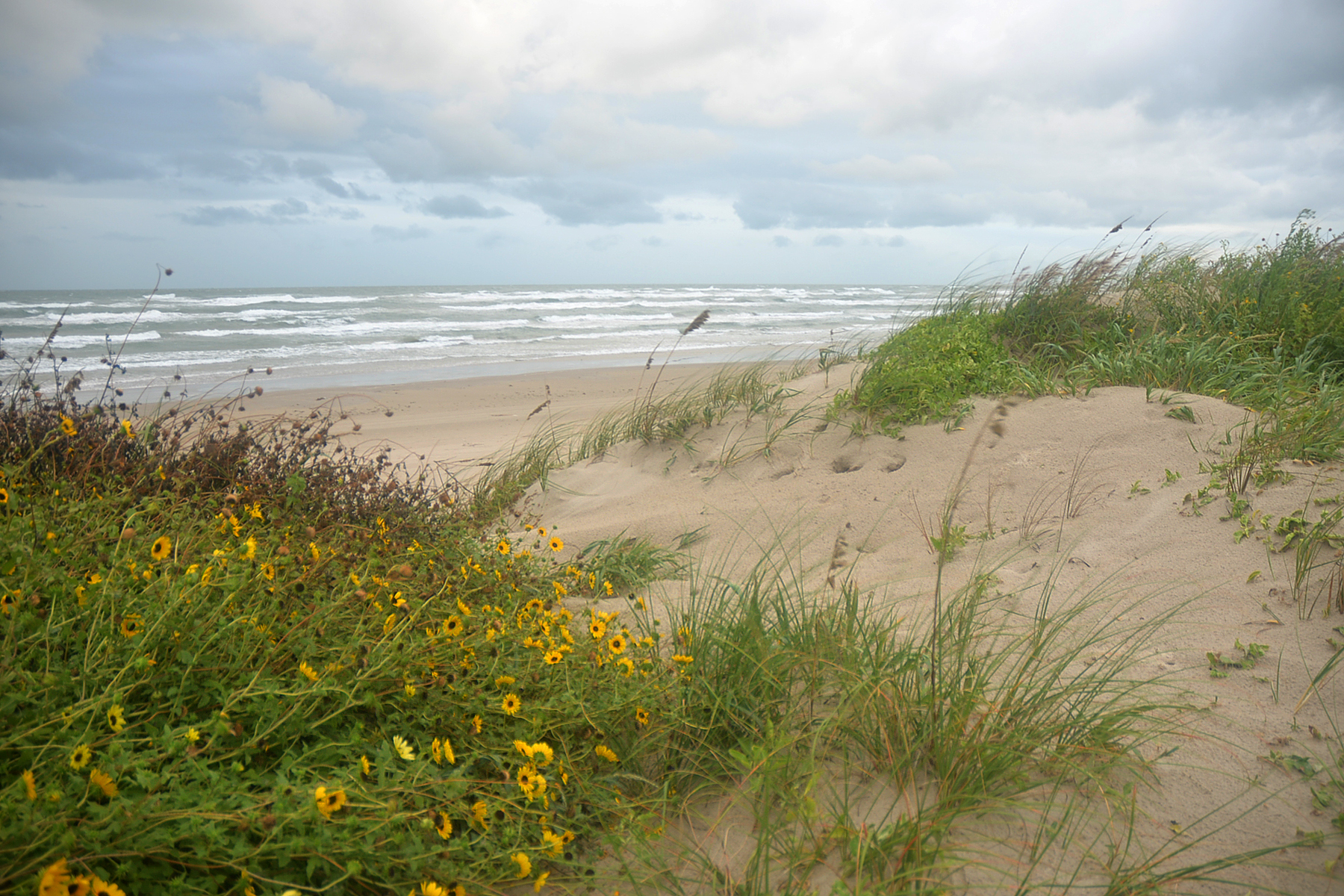
Sand dunes and wildflower at beach (Nov 2022)

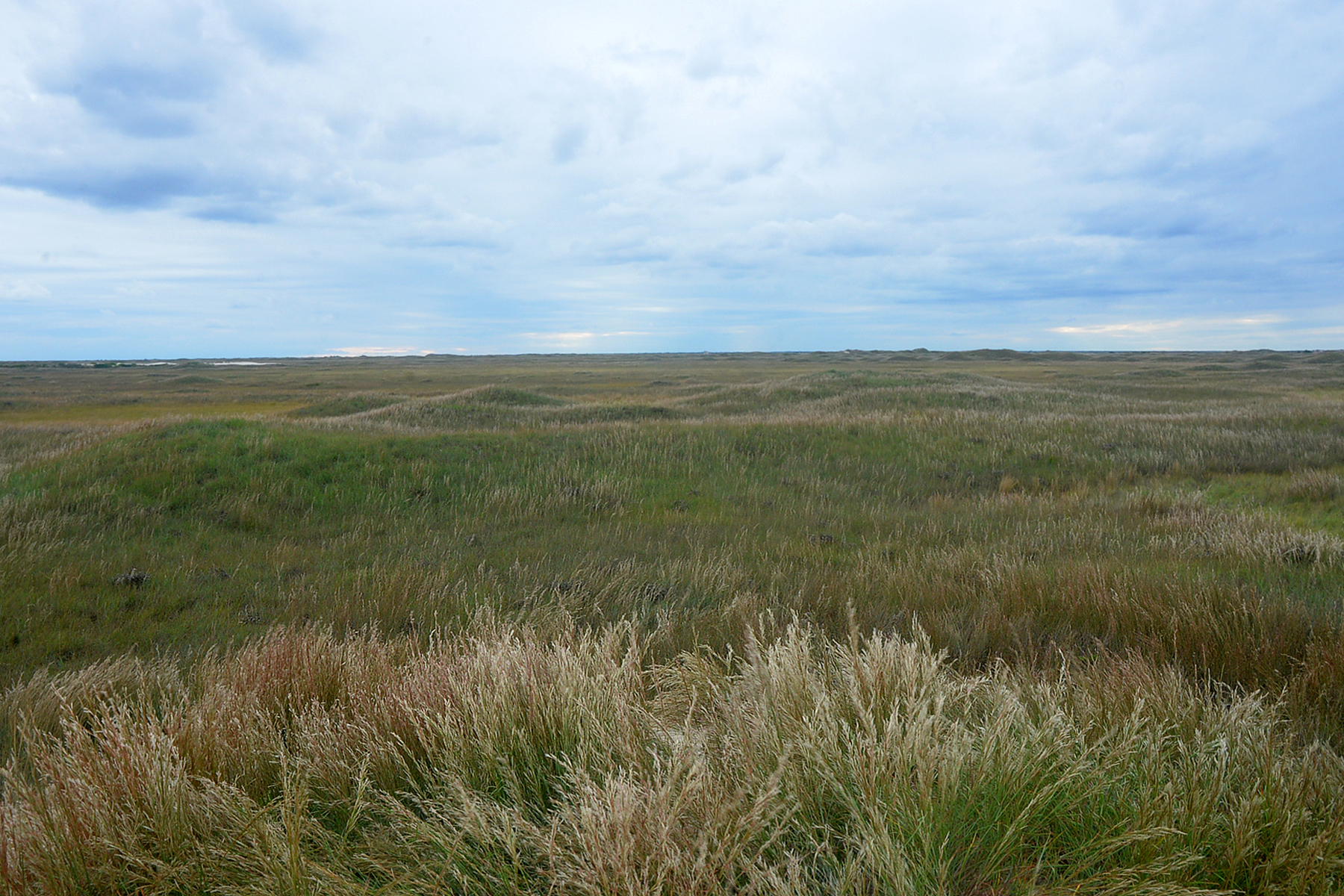
Interior island grassland (Oct 2022)

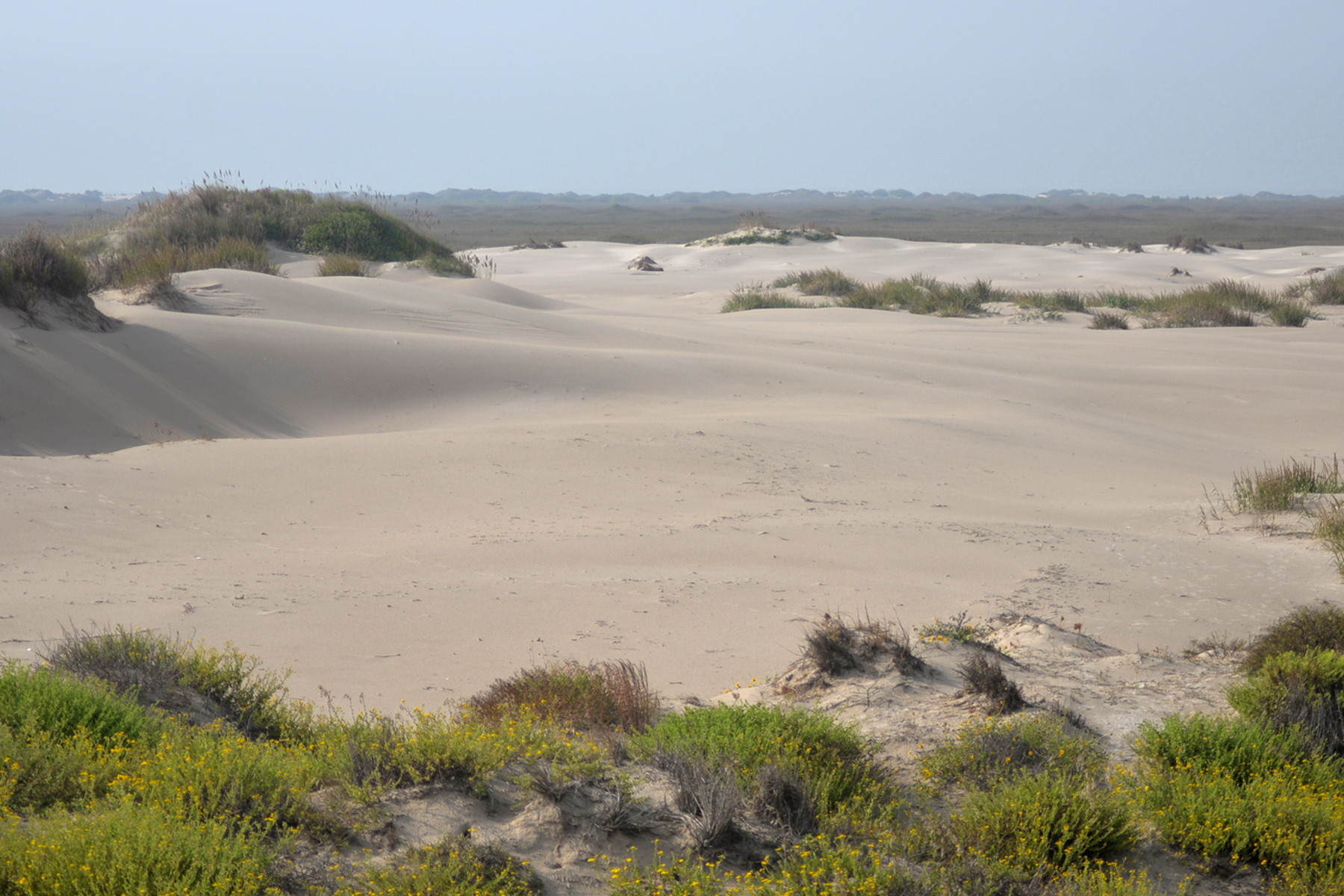
Interior island dunes (Nov 2022)

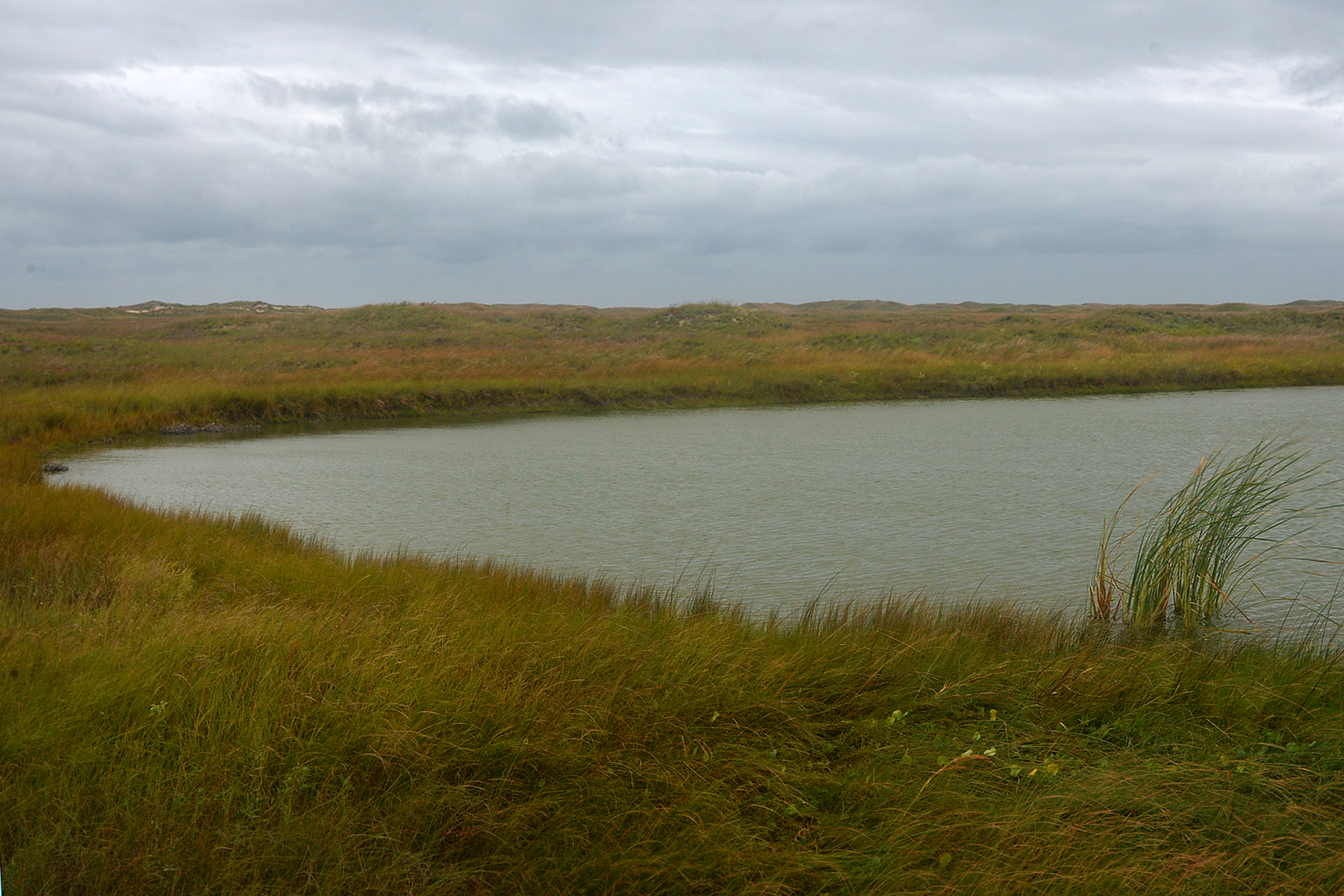
A freshwater pond (Nov 2022)

== Biology ==
=== Kemp's ridley sea turtles ===
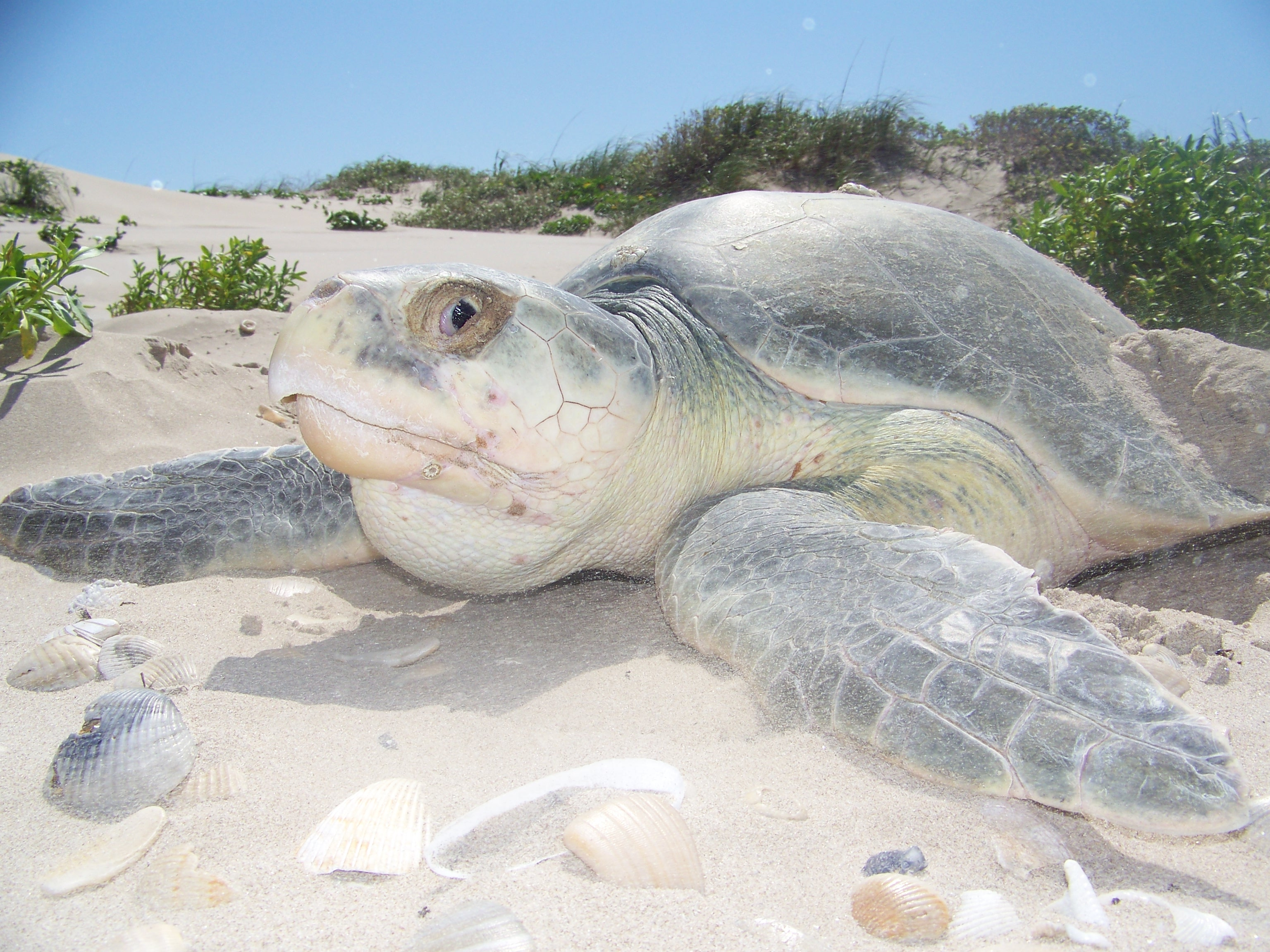
A Kemp's ridley sea turtle laying eggs on PINS (10 May 2010)

A program to re-establish a nesting beach for Kemp's ridley sea turtles on Padre Island was begun in 1978. In 1992, the first two turtles from the program returned to Padre Island beach to lay their eggs. The number of Kemp's ridley sea turtle nests on Padre Island has increased ever since with 28 being found in 2005. Park rangers at PAIS are involved in an effort to help this endangered species. In the summer, visitors can witness the release of newborn turtles.

In September 2007, Corpus Christi, Texas wildlife officials found a record of 128 Kemp's ridley sea turtle nests on Texas beaches, including 81 on North Padre Island (Padre Island National Seashore) and 4 on Mustang Island. Wildlife officials released 10,594 Kemp's ridleys hatchlings along the Texas coast this year. The turtles are endangered due to shrimpers' nets and they are popular in Mexico as boot material and food.

=== Birdwatching ===
Due to the location of Padre Island National Seashore on the Central Flyway, a major migratory route for birds, about 380 species of birds have been documented within the park, which represents approximately 45% of all bird species documented within North America. The park was designated as a "Globally Important Bird Area" by the American Bird Conservancy in 1998 for providing an "important habitat for globally significant numbers of Brown Pelicans, Redheads (5% of the world's population), Least Terns (8% of the North American population), Piping Plovers (10% of the world's population), Reddish Egrets (7% of the biogeographic population) and Peregrine Falcons (7% of the North American population)".

The best time to see the multitude of the park's bird migrants is during either early spring or fall and winter, when thousands of birds spend the winter there or migrate through the area. During the summer the most common birds are shore and marshbirds as well as some raptors and songbirds. The most common birds on the Gulf beach of the park during the year are the willet, sanderling, black skimmer, great blue heron, double-crested cormorant, cattle egret, grey plover, laughing gull, brown pelican, reddish egret, and five species of terns, including the least tern, Caspian tern, black tern, Sandwich tern, and royal tern. The two periodically appearing birds nesting on the park's shores are the least tern and piping plover.

Bird Island Basin, on the Laguna Madre side of the park, may be periodically dry during the summer or during periods of extended drought. It is home to a wide variety of birds when wet, including black-necked stilts, roseate spoonbills, great egrets, American white ibis, and many others.

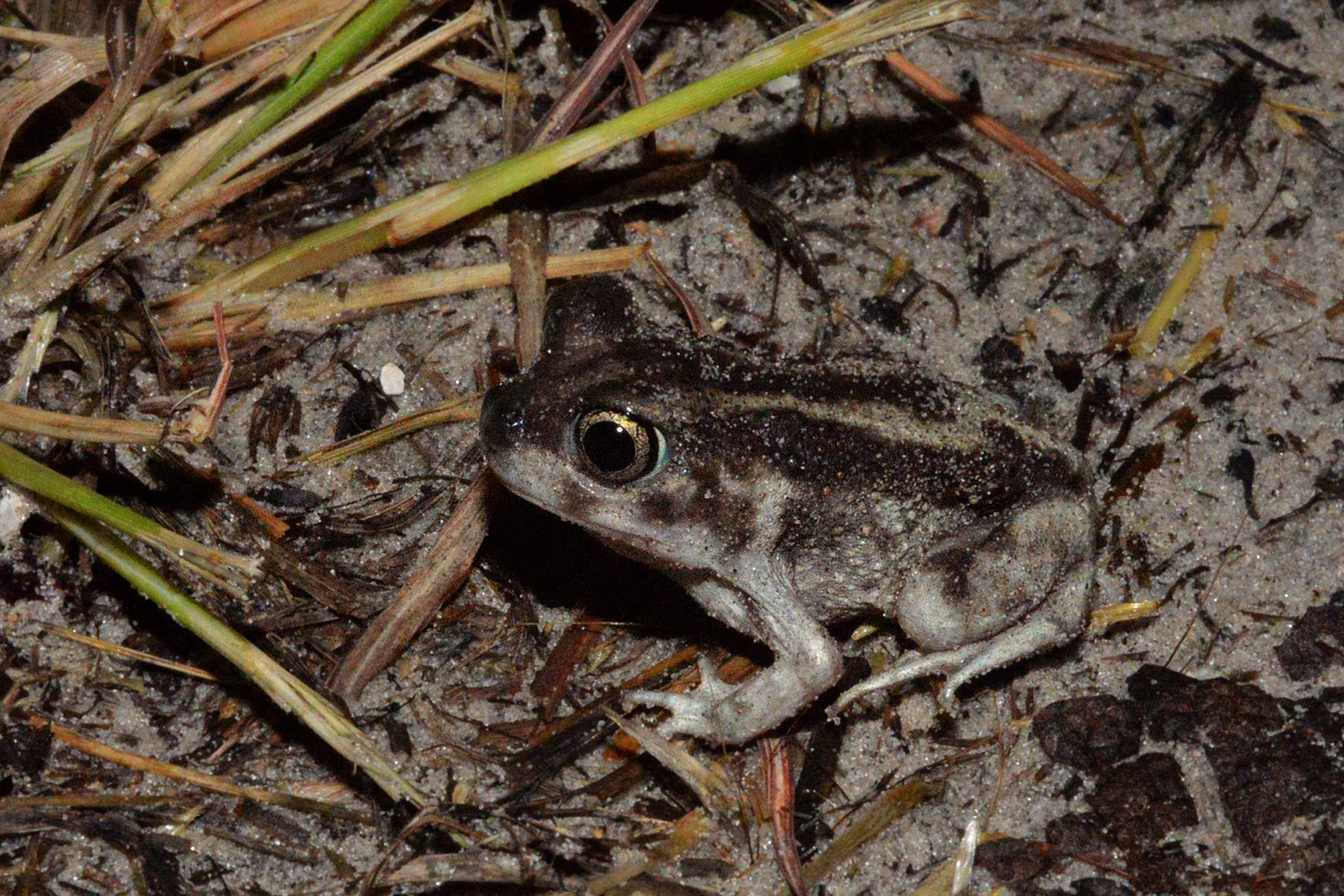
Hurter's Spadefoot Toad (Scaphiopus hurterii) Padre Island NS (Nov 2022)

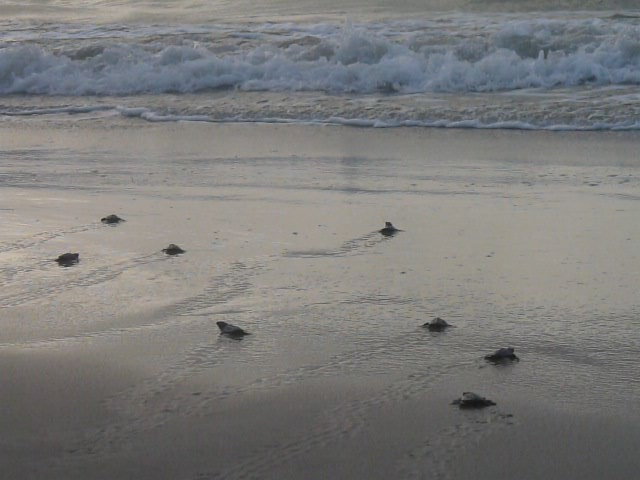
A public release of Kemp's ridley sea turtle hatchlings at Padre Island NS

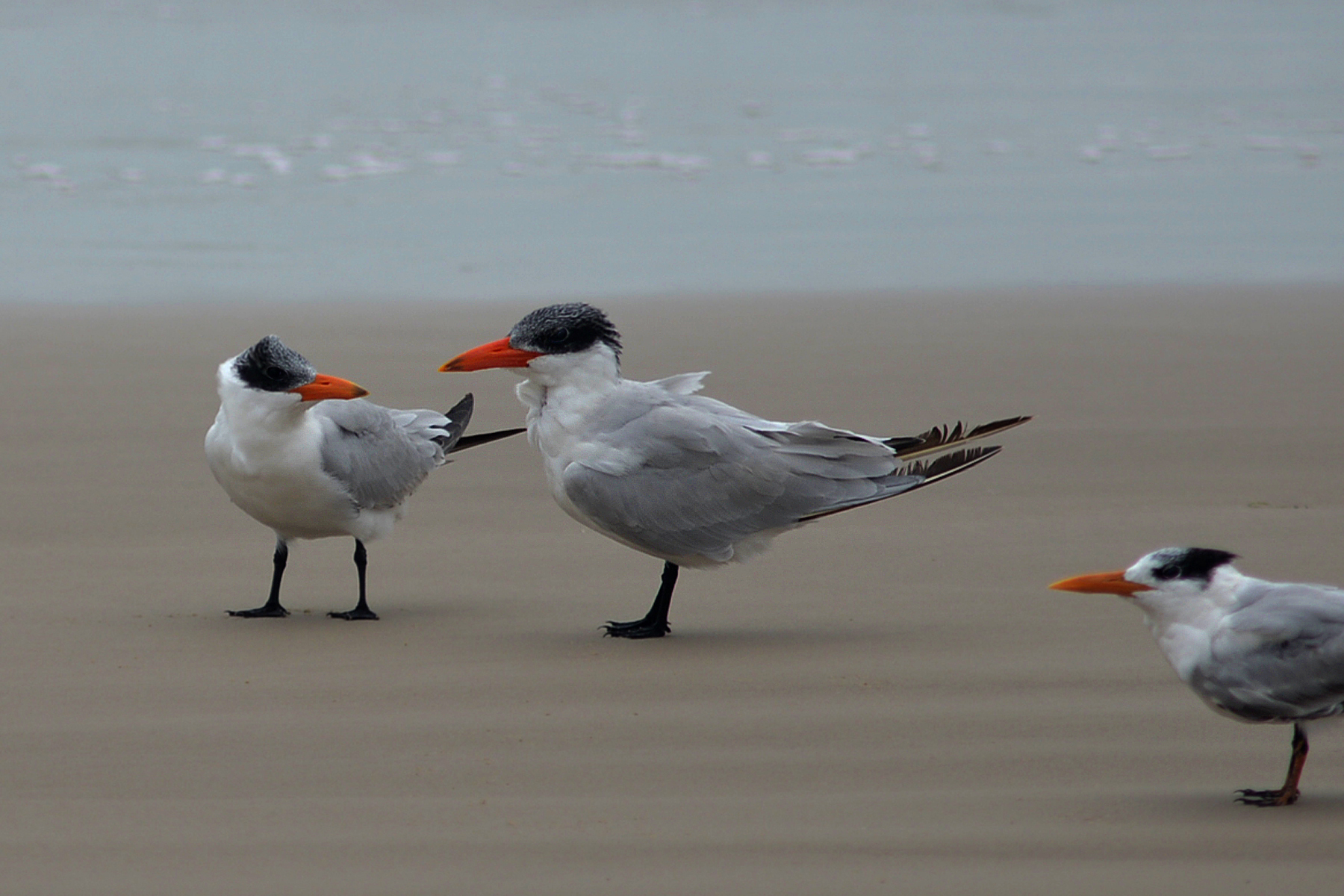
Caspian terns (Hydroprogne caspia) left, royal tern (Thalasseus maximus) right, Padre Island NS (Nov 2022)

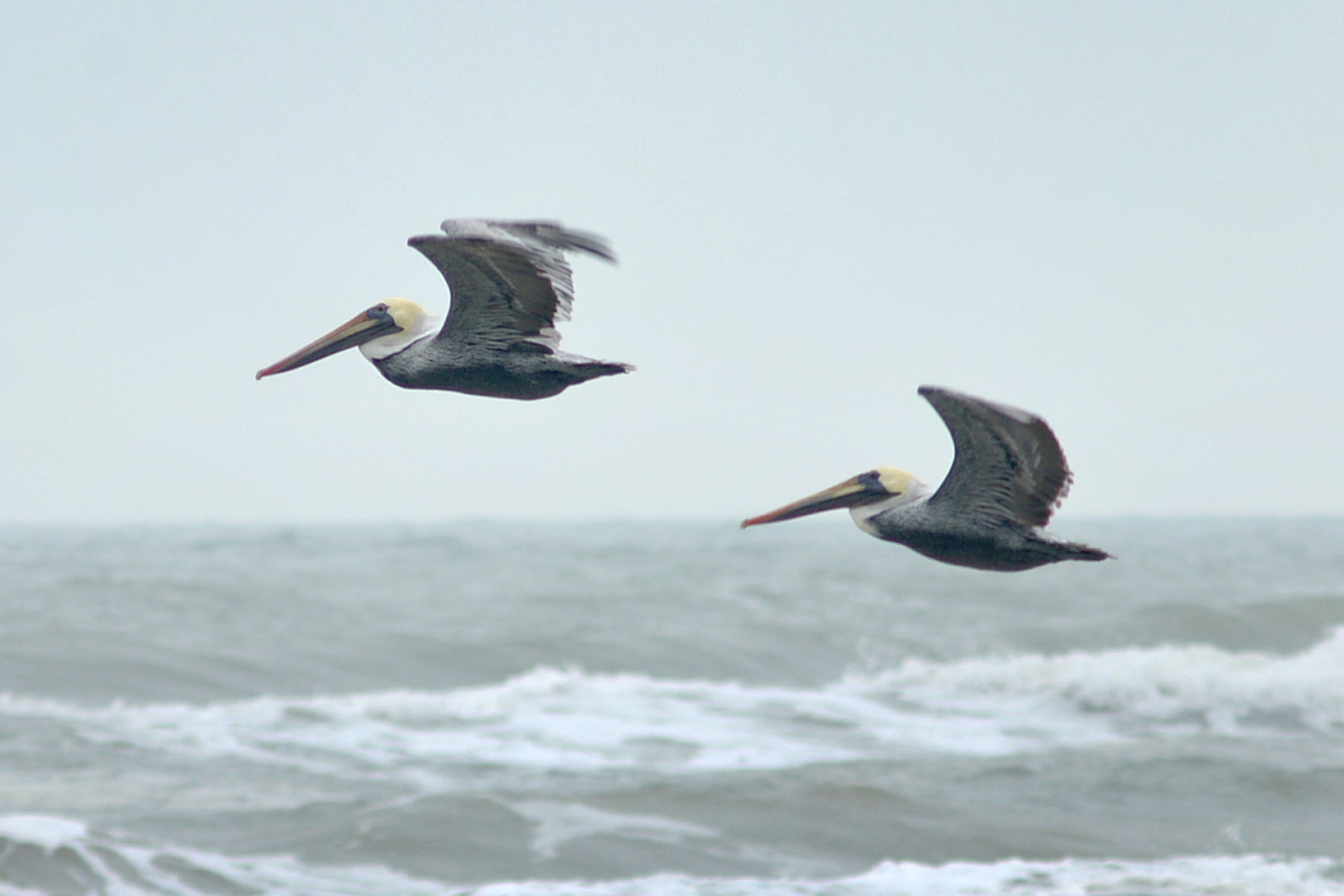
Brown Pelican (Pelecanus occidentalis), Padre Island NS (Nov 2022)

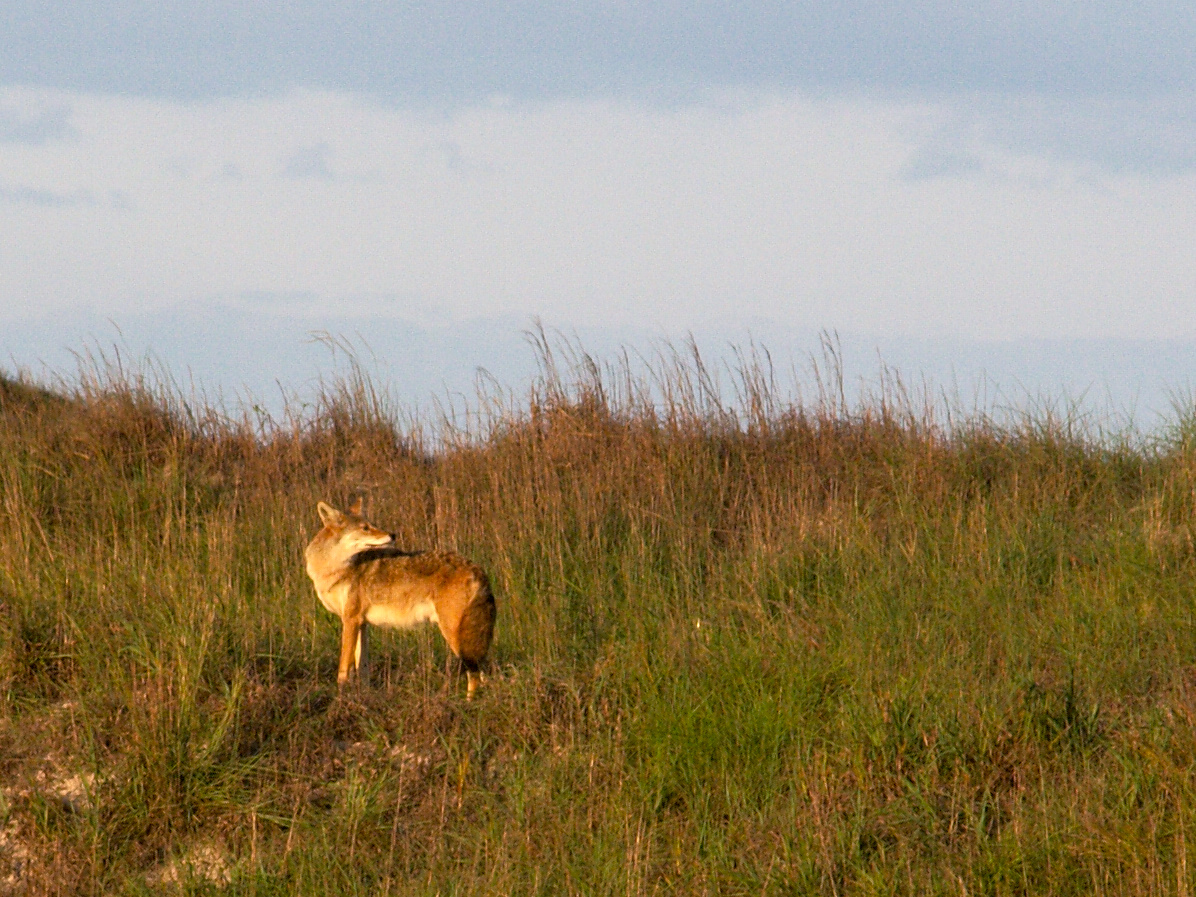
Coyote (Canis latrans), Padre Island NS (Oct 2009)

== Shoreline trash ==
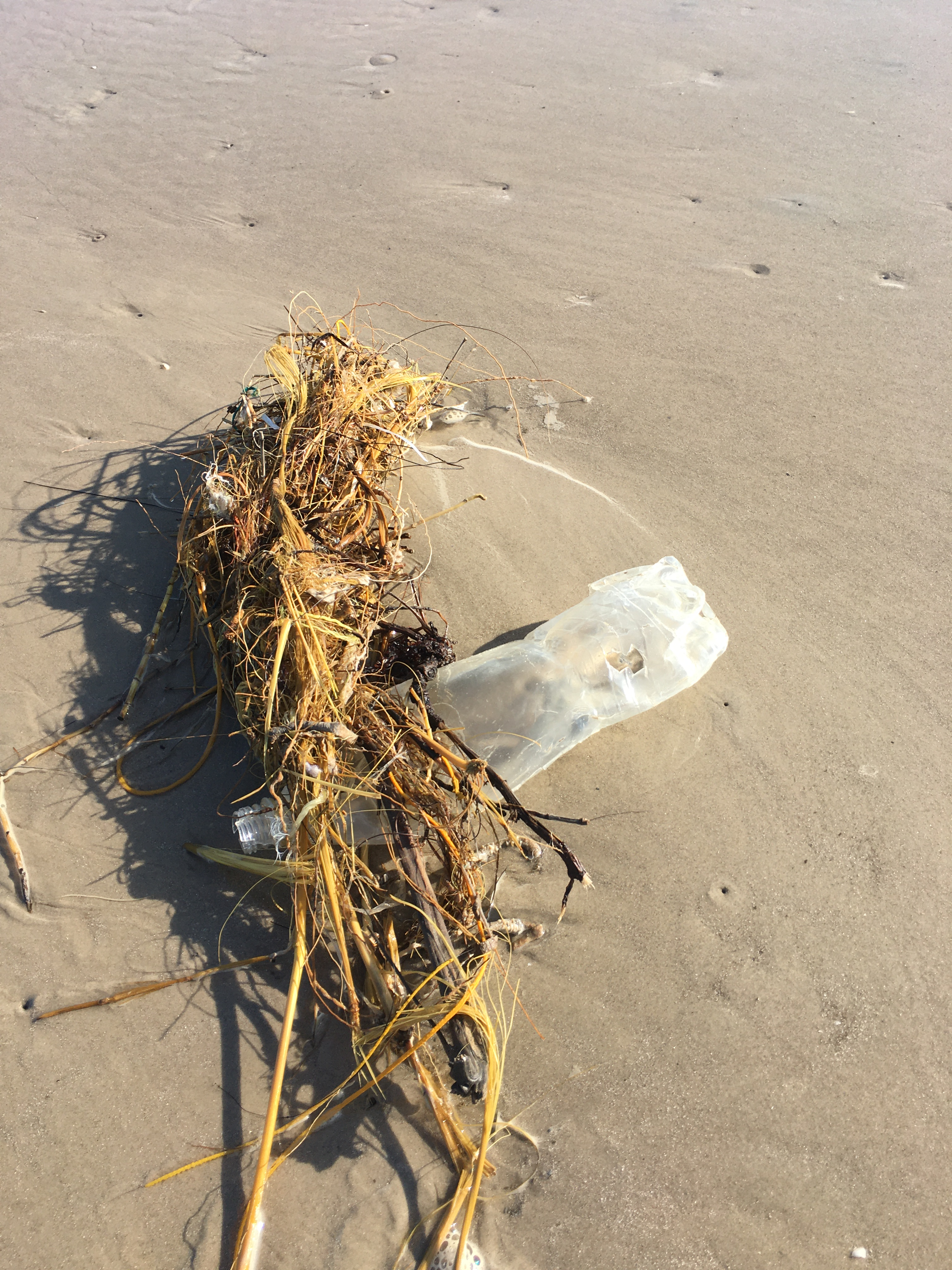
A bottle lies tangled with seaweed and fishing line in Padre Island National Seashore

During periods throughout the summer months there may be a large amount of Sargassum, a brown seaweed, which washes up on the shore which aids in shore development by acting to hold sand in place, which can eventually build up the shoreline. Currents within the Gulf of Mexico are responsible for the transport of this seaweed mainly from the Sargasso Sea, but have also been responsible for the transport of trash to the shores of the park. This trash can be anything that is tossed overboard into the Gulf of Mexico as well as items that are either washed into the Gulf from land, or from the interior of the country by means of sewers that empty into the Gulf. These items can range from tiny pieces of plastic, hypodermic needles, and lumber, to nets or bleach bottles tossed overboard by shrimpers and even objects as large as buoys and steel containers. An international treaty known as MARPOL is designed to limit the dumping of wastes into the Gulf but there can be violators and the enforcement of the treaty is difficult, as well as the fact that some trash can originate from sewage transport or even come from the Equator. Oil and tar can commonly wash up onto the beaches as well, 94% of which originates from oil spills, engine lubrication oil, and tanker washings. The park relies on a "grass roots" policy that encourages park visitors to take out more trash than they bring in. Organization such as the Friends of Padre have removed over 2,000 tons of trash at their yearly Billy Sandifer Big Shell Beach Clean Up the last weekend of February every year.

A study by the park, started in 1994, to analyze the origin of debris, titled the PAIS Marine Debris Point Source Investigation. The park began collecting data in 1998 to catalogue and remove debris from 16 miles (26 km) of beach. Currently the park has collected over 1,000 days of data for the project, covering a collective area of over 16,800 miles (27,000 km) of shoreline surveyed. This study is one of the first long-term and comprehensive marine debris research projects started within the United States. From its result the vast majority of the debris is traced to the commercial shrimping industry while approximately 14% comes from the offshore oil and gas industry.

Naturalist and fishing guide Billy Sandifer founded an annual beach cleanup at the park in 1996. The cleanup targets the Big Shell Beach portion of the island, around the 20-25 mile marker. In 2007, Sandifer established the Friends of Padre, a non-profit association to fund park projects and to organize the cleanup.

== Climate ==
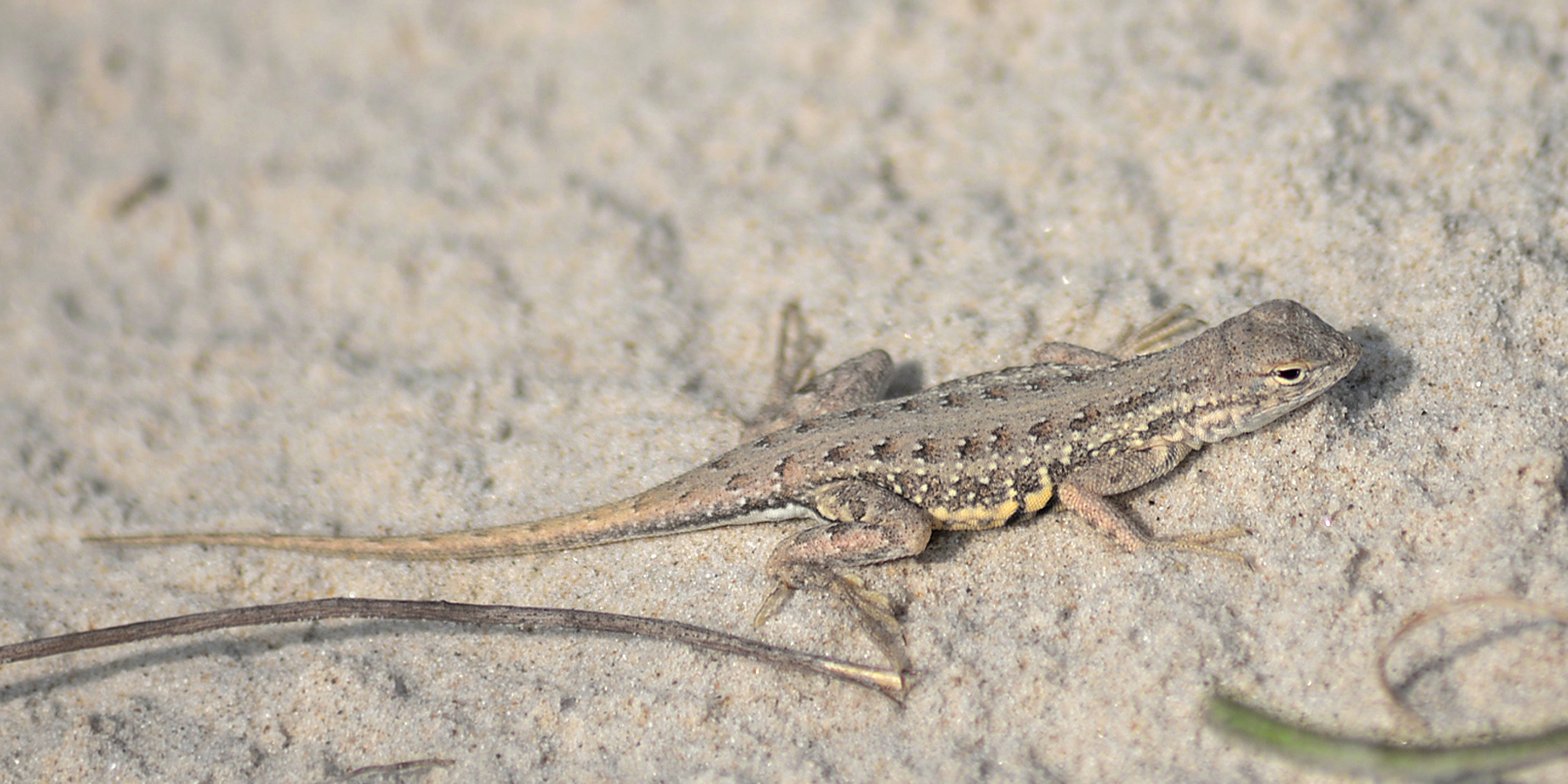
Keeled Earless Lizard (Holbrookia propinqua) male, Padre Island NS (Nov 2022)

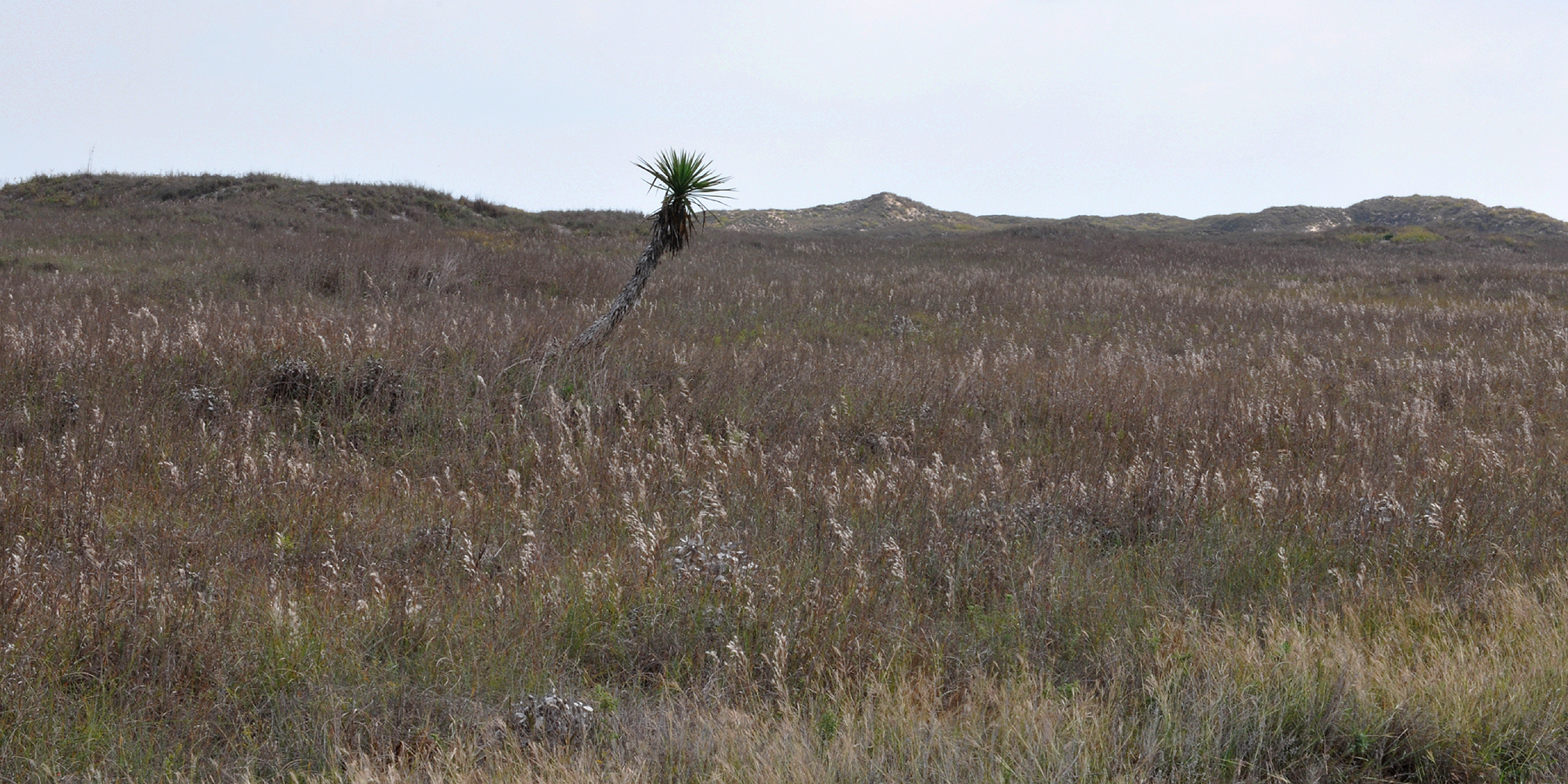
A Spanish Dagger (Yucca treculeana) growing in the grassland of Padre Island National Seashore (26 November 2011)

Padre Island National Seashore

Climate chart (precipitation, max. and min. temperature)
J	F	M	A	M	J	J	A	S	O	N	D
35 17 12	62 20 14	35 23 17	44 25 18	62 30 22	40 34 24	42 34 24	45 39 26	215 30 24	43 29 22	99 23 20	50 21 17
- █ Average max. and min. temperatures in °C
- █ Precipitation totals in mm
Imperial conversion
J	F	M	A	M	J	J	A	S	O	N	D
1.4 63 54	2.4 68 57	1.4 73 63	1.7 77 64	2.4 86 72	1.6 93 75	1.7 93 75	1.8 102 79	8.5 86 75	1.7 84 72	3.9 73 68	2 70 63
- █ Average max. and min. temperatures in °F
- █ Precipitation totals in inches

== Oil and natural gas drilling ==
Oil and natural gas drilling is allowed within the park. Congress has not approved the purchase of the mineral rights within the park even though the boundaries were surveyed as early as 1957. This has caused some controversy because the land is a protected seascape under IUCAN. Heavy equipment is used within the park and is transported across beaches that are nesting areas for not only sea turtles but many birds, including the piping plover, least tern, and other animals that may nest within the park.
