= Rosa María Hinojosa de Ballí =

Rosa María Hinojosa de Ballí (c. 1752–1803) was a rancher known as the first "cattle queen" of Texas. She was born in New Spain, in what is now as Tamaulipas. Her parents, Juan José de Hinojosa and María Antonia Inés Ballí de Benavides, were Spanish aristocrats who had priority rights to extensive land grants and public offices because they were Primitive Settlers. In 1767 her family moved to Reynosa, where her father had been appointed as alcade. Rosa married José María Ballí, who was a captain of the militia.

She inherited 55,000 acres of land from her husband in 1790, although it was in much debt; within thirteen years she doubled the property, as well as making improvements upon it.

Rosa endowed churches, including the first chapel in Matamoros.

When she died she owned more than one million acres of land in what is now the Rio Grande Valley.

Her son Padre Ballí was an original grantee of Padre Island, which was named after him. Rosa had made a joint application with Padre for eleven leagues of the island, but when reapplication was required in 1800, she withdrew her name in favor of him.
