= South Bay (Texas) =

- South Bay Coastal Preserve
- Location within Texas Location within the United States

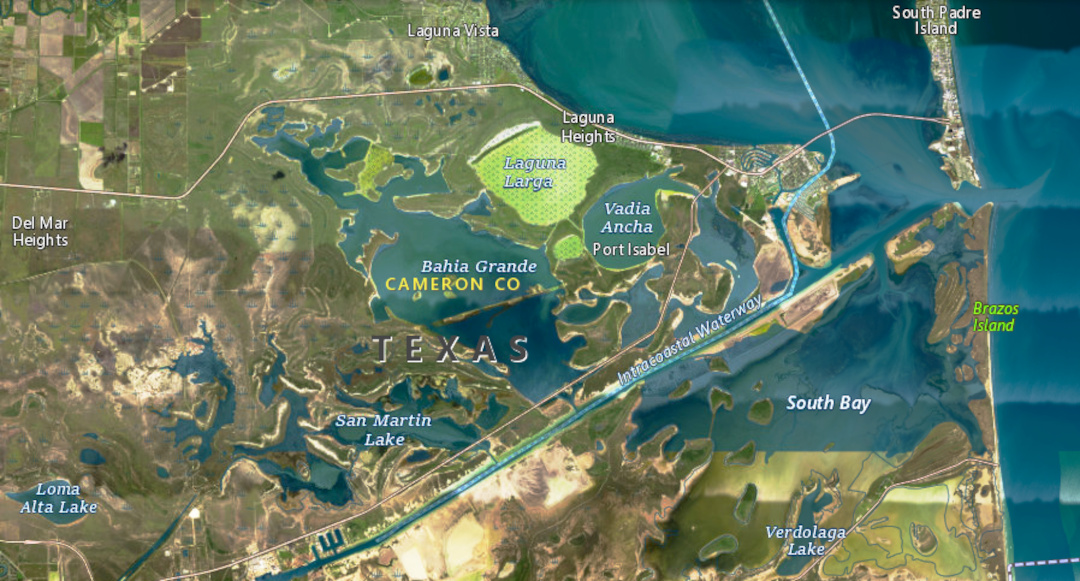
- South Bay at Texas Gulf Coast
- Location: Boca Chica; Cameron County; Texas
- Coordinates: 26°1′46.29″N 97°11′2.90″W
- Part of: Boca Chica Bay; South Bay Pass; Verdolaga Lake
- Basin countries: United States
- Max. length: 3 miles (4.8 km)
- Max. width: 2.5 miles (4.0 km)
- Surface area: 3.1 square miles (8.0 km^{2})
- Average depth: 2 ft (0.61 m) ~ 4 ft (1.2 m)
- Islands: Brazos Island
- References: ☆ 1376184; ☆ South Bay

South Bay is a bay in the Laguna Madre in Texas separated from the Gulf of Mexico by Brazos Island. It is the southernmost bay in Texas, about 1 mi (1.6 km) north of the Texas-Mexico Border.

== Depiction of Texas Rio Grande Valley Seacoast ==
Lower Laguna Madre at Texas Gulf Coast

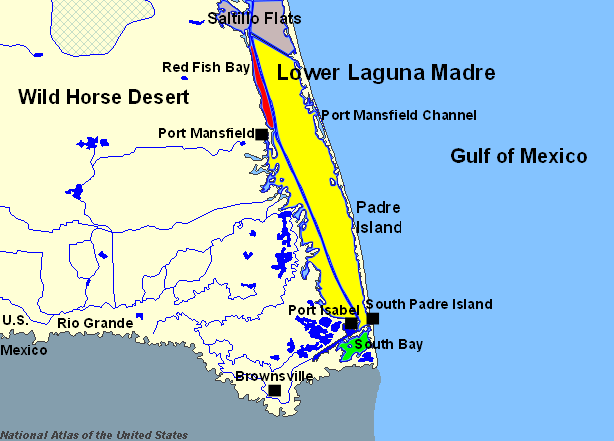
Illustration of South Bay at Port Isabel, Texas

== See also ==
- Brazos Santiago Pass
- Port Isabel, Texas
- Port of Brownsville
