= Follet's Island =

Barrier island off Christmas Bay, Texas

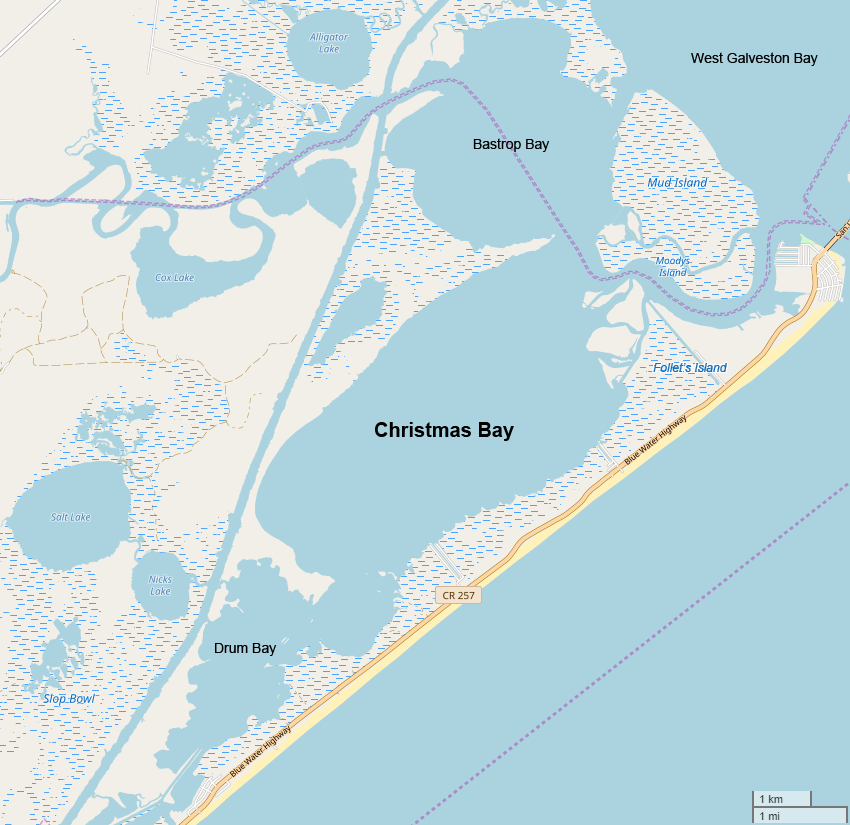
- Follet's Island and Christmas Bay

- Location within Texas

Geography
- Location: Gulf of Mexico
- Coordinates: 29°2′33″N 95°10′11″W
- Length: 13 mi (21 km)
- Highest elevation: 3.5 ft (1.07 m)

Administration
- United States
- State: Texas
- County: Brazoria County
- Largest settlement: Surfside Beach, Texas

Follet's Island is a barrier island on the Texas Gulf Coast in Brazoria County, Texas, immediately southwest of Galveston Island. It forms part of the Texas barrier islands chain that protects the mainland from storm surges and coastal erosion.

The island separates Christmas Bay and Drum Bay from the Gulf of Mexico, creating a unique estuarine environment. It is approximately 13 miles (21 km) long and averages 3.5 feet (1.1 m) above mean sea level, making it highly vulnerable to storm surge and coastal flooding.

== History ==
Follet's Island has historical significance dating back to the early Spanish explorations of the Texas coast. Many historians believe that Álvar Núñez Cabeza de Vaca and survivors of the Narváez expedition landed here in the 16th century after being shipwrecked. During the 19th century, the island was sparsely inhabited and used for cattle grazing. Today, the southwestern tip hosts the city of Surfside Beach, Texas, a popular destination for beachgoers and anglers.

== Geography ==
Follet's Island is part of the Upper Texas Coast barrier system, which includes Galveston Island and Matagorda Island. It is bordered by San Luis Pass to the northeast and Drum Bay to the southwest. The island consists primarily of sandy beaches, dunes, and low-lying marshes.

== Ecology ==
The island and adjacent bays support diverse wildlife. Salt marshes and seagrass beds provide habitat for red drum, speckled trout, southern flounder, and blue crab. Migratory birds such as brown pelican, piping plover, and roseate spoonbill frequent the area, which is part of the Great Texas Coastal Birding Trail.

== Recreation ==
Follet's Island is known for surf fishing, beachcombing, and kayaking in nearby Christmas Bay. Public beach access is available along Texas State Highway 257, which runs the length of the island. Surfside Beach offers amenities such as fishing piers, boat ramps, and vacation rentals.

== Conservation and Threats ==
The island faces significant erosion and habitat loss due to sea-level rise, hurricanes, and human development. Restoration projects by the Texas General Land Office and U.S. Army Corps of Engineers include dune stabilization and beach nourishment to protect infrastructure and ecosystems.

== See also ==
- Christmas Bay (Texas)
- Galveston Island
- Texas barrier islands
- Surfside Beach, Texas
