= Padre Island =

Barrier island in southern Texas

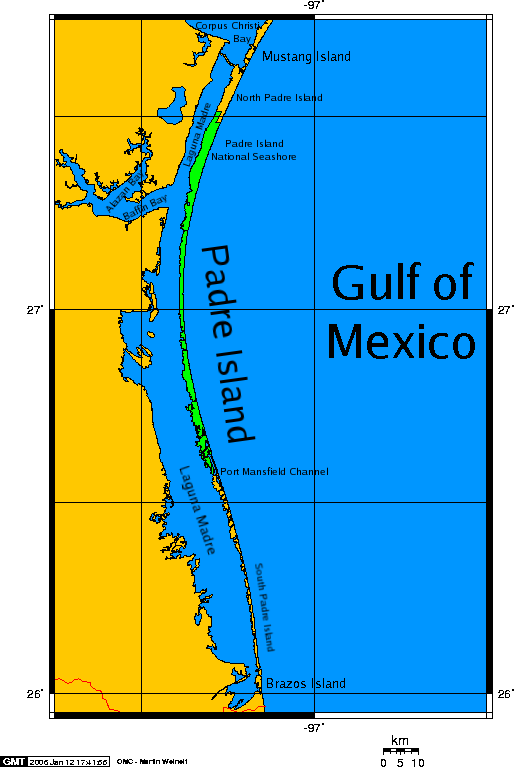
- Padre Island map, showing the Laguna Madre waters enclosed along the south Texas coast.
- Interactive map of Padre Island

Geography
- Location: Gulf of Mexico
- Coordinates: 26°50′40″N 97°22′04″W
- Area: 209 sq mi (540 km^{2})(31st in U.S.)
- Length: 113 mi (182 km)
- Width: 1.61 mi (2.59 km)
- Coastline: 263.22 mi (423.61 km)

Administration
- United States
- State: Texas
- Counties: Cameron, Kenedy, Kleberg, Nueces, Willacy

Additional information
- Official website: www.nps.gov/pais/index.htm
- See: North and South Padre Island

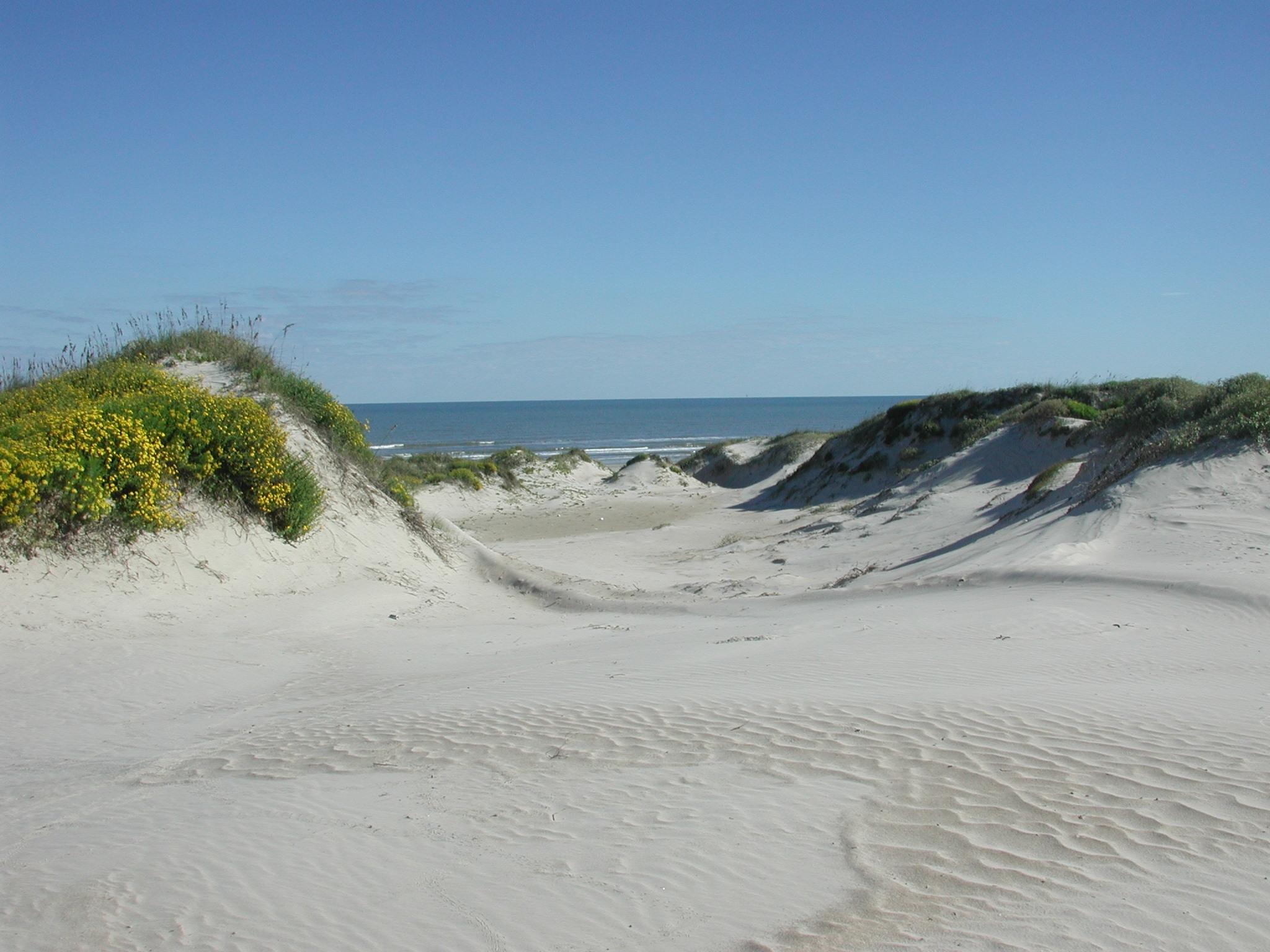
Padre Island sand dunes

Padre Island is the largest of the Texas barrier islands and the world's longest barrier island. The island is located along Texas's southern coast of the Gulf of Mexico and is noted for its white sandy beaches. Meaning father in Spanish, it was named after Father José Nicolás Ballí (c.1770-1829), who owned the island and served as a missionary priest and collector of finances for all the churches in the Rio Grande Valley. He also founded the first mission in present-day Cameron County.

Padre Island is the second-largest island by area in the contiguous United States, after Long Island in New York on the Atlantic Coast. It is about 113 miles (182 km) long and 1.8 miles (3 km) wide, stretching from the city of Corpus Christi, in the north, to the resort community of South Padre Island in the south. The island is oriented north-south, bordered by the Gulf of Mexico on the east and Laguna Madre on the west. The island's northern end connects to Mustang Island by roadway. The southern end of the island is separated from Brazos Island by the Brazos Santiago Pass.

The town of South Padre Island is located on its southern end, with the city of Corpus Christi situated at the northern end, but the island as a whole is sparsely populated. The central part of the island is preserved in a natural wild state as Padre Island National Seashore and part of the lower island is protected as part of the Laguna Atascosa National Wildlife Refuge. Since 1964, the island has been divided by the artificial Port Mansfield Channel. The terms "North Padre Island" and "South Padre Island" are often used to refer to the separated portions of the island. Padre Island is included within the jurisdictions of Cameron, Kenedy, Kleberg, Nueces, and Willacy counties in Texas.

== History ==
The island was used and occupied seasonally by the Karankawa people at the time of European encounter. During Spanish rule, Father José Nicolás Ballí, also known as Padre Ballí, owned the island in the 19th century, when it was known as the Isla de Santiago land grant. Padre Island had been granted in 1759 to his Spanish colonist grandfather, Nicolás Ballí, by King Charles III of Spain. The younger Ballí's parents were both Spanish immigrants to Mexico and owned vast amounts of land by royal grants.

José Nicolás Ballí served as a secular priest and missionary; he also managed large amounts of land where he ran a ranching operation. In 1804 he founded the first ethnic Mexican settlement on the island as the town of "El Rancho Santa Cruz de Buena Vista" (later known as Lost City). In 1827 after Mexico achieved independence, Father Ballí requested a clear title to the property of Padre Island. His mother Rosa María Hinojosa de Ballí had made a joint application with him for eleven leagues of the island, but when reapplication was required in 1800, she withdrew her name in favor of him.

After Ballí died in 1829, the government granted title to the island to him posthumously, issued jointly in his name and that of his nephew Juan José Ballí. He had bequeathed half the island to his nephew, who had worked with him on his ranch.

During World War II, United States scientists considered Padre Island as one of eight candidate sites for the first test of an atomic bomb but chose White Sands Missile Range in New Mexico for the detonation, instead.

During 1953-1956, an annual 110-mile, three-day walking race was held going the length of the island, south to north, called Padre Island Walkathon. It was the first modern-era ultramarathon in America and involved up to 148 walkers, with a large mobile support staff. At the time, it claimed to be “the toughest, roughest athletic contest in the world,” with a finish rate of only 11%.

== Geology ==
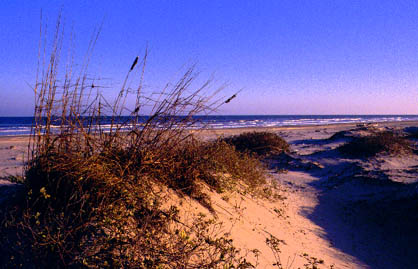
Padre Island sand dunes at sunset

Geologically speaking, Padre Island is a young island, having formed in just the last several thousand years. It is one of 300 barrier islands stretching from Maine to Mexico. These natural barrier islands act to protect the mainland from the direct onslaught of storms.

Padre Island began forming as a submerged sand bar some 4500 years ago, as shown by radiocarbon dating of shells. Geologic speculation indicates the emerged island may be 1000 to 1500 years younger. Barrier island origins have been debated for many years by geologists, but it is agreed they are formed and modified by such factors as sediment type and supply, sea-level directional changes, current and wave strength and direction, and tide magnitude.

It is theorized that Padre Island formed from offshore shoals, with later growth aided by spit accretion. (A spit is a long, narrow tongue of sand extending from a mainland shoreline and formed by the shoreline drifting of sediments.) After a history of shifting, abandonment and reestablishment by storm breaches, many tidal inlets were slowly closed. Short islands were joined to form today's longer islands.

Padre Island graphically illustrates the life and sequences of a barrier shoreline: accretionary or building phase, equilibrium or stability phase, and erosion or destructional state. The northern half of Padre Island's shoreline is in equilibrium; the southern half (and much of the remaining Texas coastline) is in an erosional stage. Wind, wave and current action continue to rework and shape the island. South Padre Island has been in a destructive phase for a long time, probably having retreated landward (along with the lagoon and mainland shoreline).

All of Padre Island will probably retreat landward through long-term erosion due to three causes: interruption and decrease in sediment supply, relative sea level rise, and tropical storm activity. Today, hurricane washovers and wind-carried sand deposited in Laguna Madre build Padre Island's landward side at the expense of Laguna Madre.

== Wildlife ==
=== Birds ===
Flocks of migratory birds arrive at the island during either early spring or fall and winter, with thousands of birds spending the winter there or migrating through the area. During the summer the most common birds are shore and marshbirds as well as some raptors and songbirds.

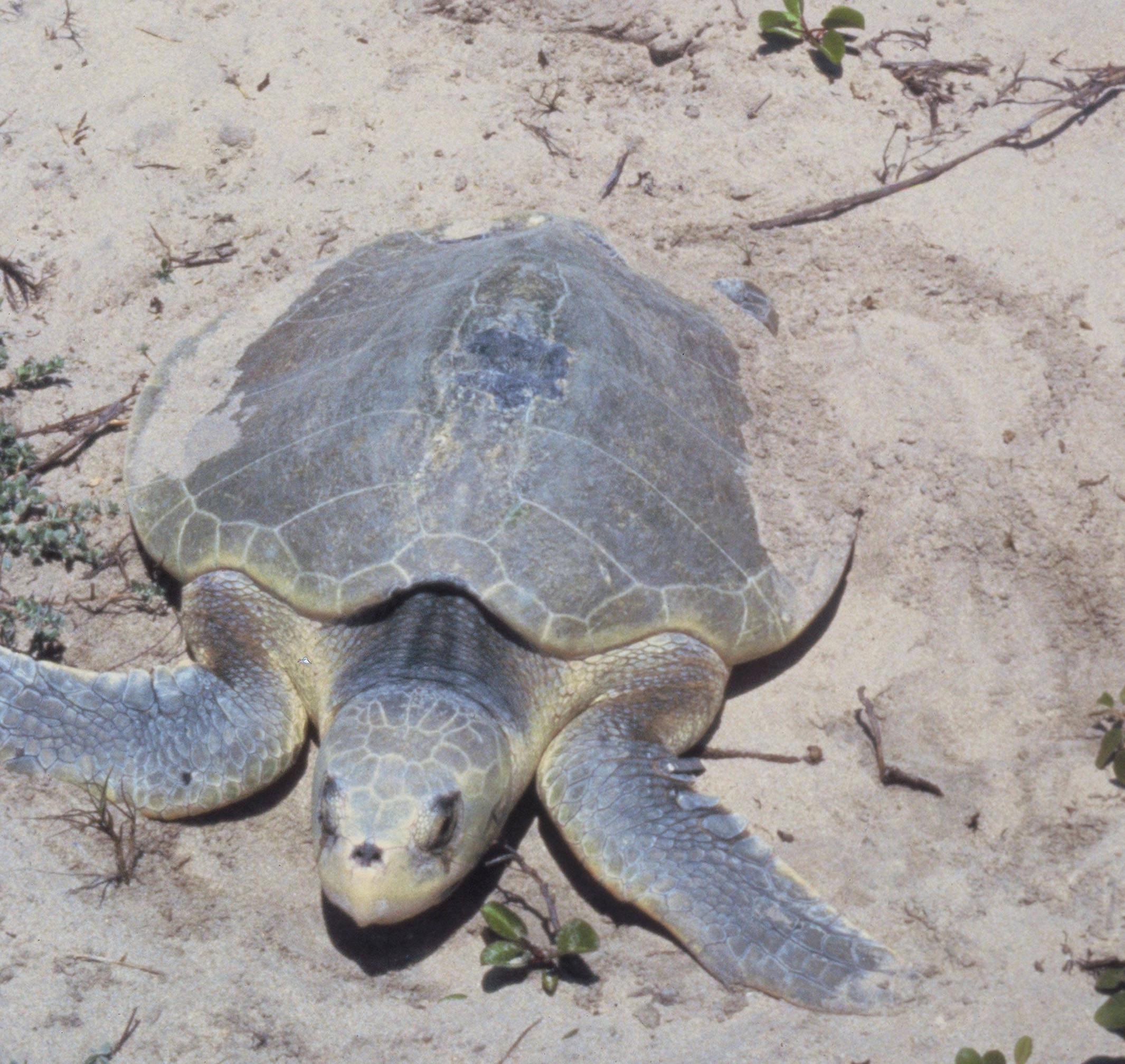
Kemp's ridley sea turtle

The most common birds on the Gulf beach during the year are the willet, sanderling, black skimmer, great blue heron, double-crested cormorant, cattle egret, grey plover, laughing gull, brown pelican, reddish egret, and five species of terns, including the least tern, Caspian tern, black tern, Sandwich tern, and royal tern. The two periodically appearing birds nesting on the park's shores are the least tern and piping plover.

=== Kemp's ridley sea turtle ===
In September 2007, Corpus Christi, Texas wildlife officials found a record 128 Kemp's ridley sea turtle nests on Texas beaches, including 81 in the Padre Island National Seashore and 4 on nearby Mustang Island. Wildlife officials had released 10,594 Kemp's ridleys hatchlings along the Texas coast in 2007. The turtles are endangered due to getting caught in shrimpers' nets; they are widely hunted in Mexico as popular sources of boot material and food.

== See also ==
- List of islands of the United States
  - List of islands of the United States by area
- Padre Island National Seashore
