= Brazos Island =

Island in Texas, U.S.

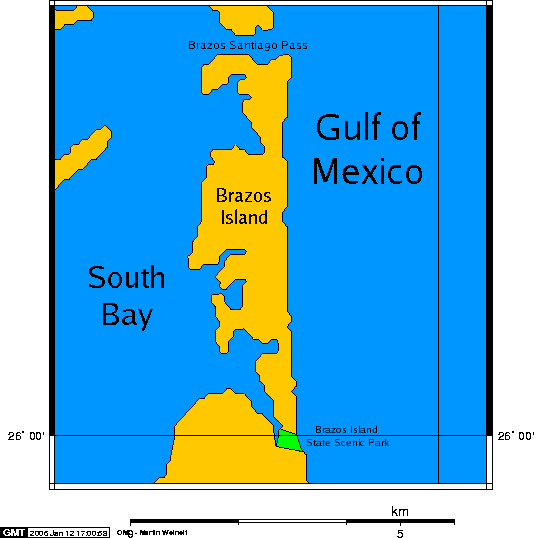
- Brazos Island and South Bay

- Location within Texas Location within the United States

Geography
- Location: Gulf of Mexico
- Coordinates: 26°01′50″N 97°09′27″W
- Archipelago: Texas barrier islands

Administration
- United States
- State: Texas
- County: Cameron County

Brazos Island, also known as Brazos Santiago Island, is a barrier island on the Gulf Coast of Texas in the United States, south of the town of South Padre Island and north of the city of Starbase. The island is located in Cameron County.

Brazos Santiago Pass partitions the barrier islands of Brazos Island and Padre Island in the Lower Rio Grande Valley.
