= Mustang Island =

Texas barrier island

Coordinates: 27°44′22″N 97°07′54″W

- Map showing Mustang Island, in a long chain of barrier islands (see: Padre Island, to the south).
- Interactive map of Mustang Island

Geography
- Location: Gulf of Mexico
- Length: 18 mi (29 km)
- Highest elevation: 3 ft (0.9 m)

Administration
- United States
- State: Texas
- County: Nueces

Additional information
- Official website: tpwd.texas.gov/state-parks/mustang-island

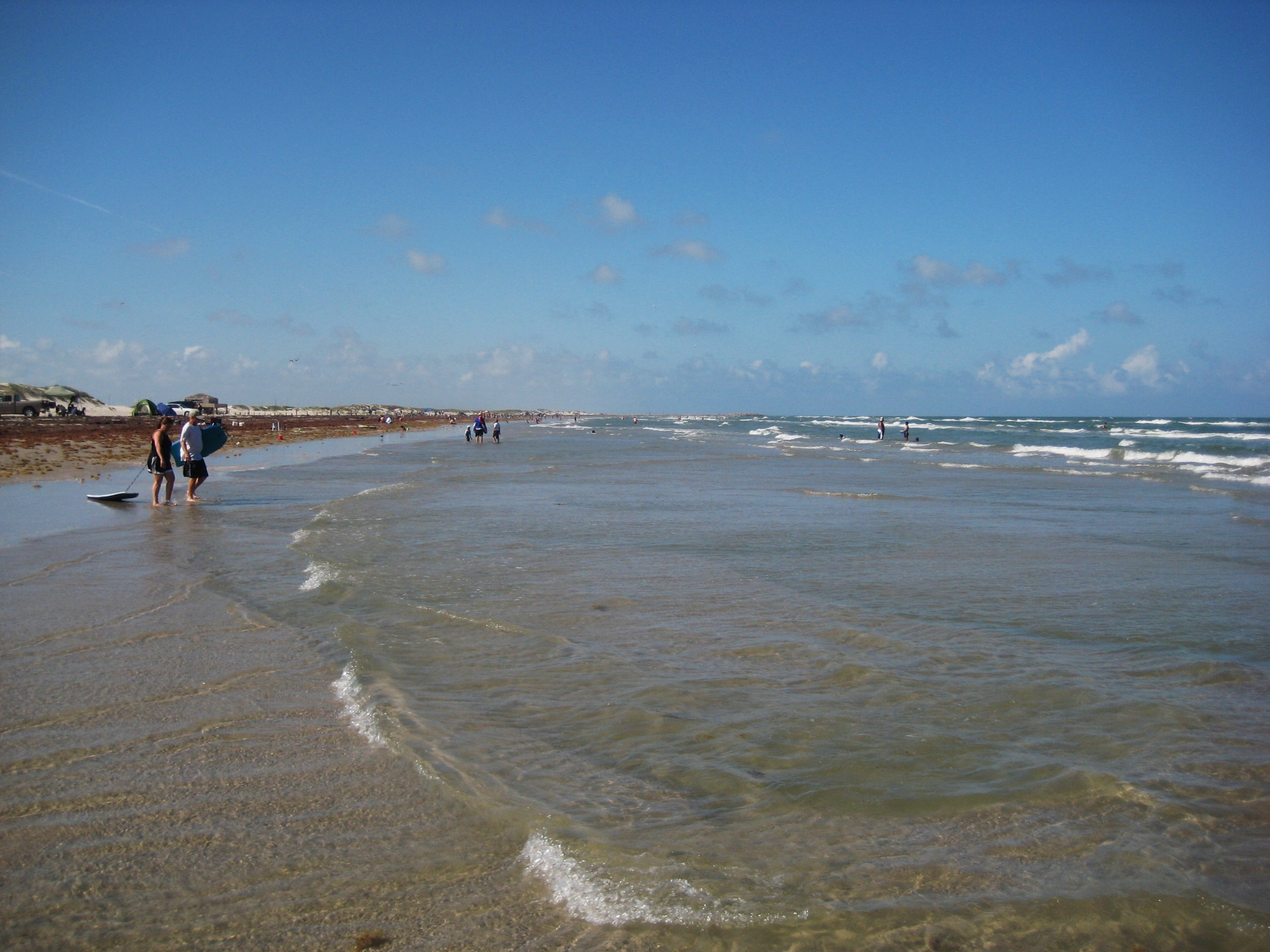
The beach at Mustang Island State Park

Mustang Island is a barrier island on the Gulf Coast of Texas in the United States. The island is 18 miles (29 km) long, stretching from Corpus Christi to Port Aransas. The island is oriented generally northeast–southwest, with the Gulf of Mexico on the east and south, and Corpus Christi Bay on the north and west. The island's southern end connects by roadway to Padre Island. At the northern end of the island is Port Aransas, beyond which is San José Island. The Aransas Channel, also known as the "Aransas Pass", which separates Mustang Island from San José Island, is protected by jetties extending into the Gulf from each island.

The town of Port Aransas is located at the northern end of the island. Mustang Island State Park encompasses the entire southern third of the island, including 3,955 acres (1,600 ha) and 5 miles (8 km) of beach. The city of Corpus Christi includes the northernmost portion of Padre Island and part of Mustang Island between Port Aransas and the state park.

The island is a popular Spring Break destination for its beaches and is also popular with snowbirds, Northerners and Canadians who spend their winters in warm climates.

== History ==
Mustang Island was first inhabited by Paleo-Indians. In 1519, when Spanish explorer Alonso Álvarez de Pineda sailed through the pass to what he later named Corpus Christi Bay, the island was inhabited by the Karankawa people. By the 18th century, as a result of grazing herds of horses introduced by Spanish settlers, the island was first called "Wild Horse", then "Mustang Island". Up to the 1840s, the island and pass (now the ship channel) were used by buccaneers, Mexican smugglers, merchants and immigrants seeking their fortune or someone else's fortune. The pirate Jean Lafitte purportedly frequented Mustang and neighboring islands during the 1820s.

During the Mexican–American War, a small fort was built on the island to defend the entrance to Aransas Bay.

Captain Robert Mercer was the first settler to set up residence on the island with his family. His wife is said to have been the first white woman in the area. He built a house there in 1853 and named it El Mar Rancho.

== Wildlife ==
- In September 2007, Corpus Christi, Texas wildlife officials found a record of 128 Kemp's ridley sea turtle nests on Texas beaches, including 81 on North Padre Island (Padre Island National Seashore) and 4 on Mustang Island. Wildlife officials released 10,594 Kemp's ridleys hatchlings along the Texas coast that year. The turtles are endangered due to shrimpers' nets and they are popular in Mexico as boot material and food.
- On June 10, 2008, a sperm whale beached itself on one of the island's beaches. It had to be euthanized because the city did not have the equipment needed to move the large whale.
