= Padre Ballí =

Padre Ballí (ca. 1770–1829), also known as José Nicolás Ballí, was a rancher, a priest, and an original grantee of Padre Island, which was named after him. However, when he owned the island, it was known as the Isla de Santiago land grant. Padre Island had been granted to his grandfather, Nicolás Ballí, in 1759 by King Charles III of Spain, and Padre Ballí requested a clear title to the property in 1827. His mother Rosa María Hinojosa de Ballí had made a joint application with Padre for eleven leagues of the island, but when reapplication was required in 1800, she withdrew her name in favor of him.

== Early life ==
Padre Nicolas Balli was born circa 1768. He was born into a wealthy family in Reynosa, Mexico. His brother was the chief justice and captain of Reynosa. His grandfather had also been a justice and captain. He owned vast amounts of land in the Rio Grande Valley. Nicolas chose to become a priest.

== Career ==
He was the first settler who brought families to the island. He also built the first church on the island for the conversion of the Karankawa Indians and the benefit of the settlers. About 26 miles (42 km) north of the island's southern tip, he founded the town of El Rancho Santa Cruz de Buena Vista (later known as Lost City, rediscovered in 1931), where he also kept cattle, horses, and mules. This town, established in 1804, was the first European settlement on the island.

He did not live on the island but had two hired hands who managed things for him there. Ballí was the first person to have the island surveyed, which occurred as required in 1828 after Mexico became independent in 1821; the survey report described his land as "characterized by high sand dunes, some of which were covered with grass. In addition, one found a great number of willows, oleanders, short oaks, plenty of herbs known as anise, and many freshwater lakes or pools covered with reeds."

== Death ==
Ballí died on April 16, 1829, and was buried near Matamoros. Title to the island was granted to him posthumously on December 15, 1829, issued jointly in his name and the name of his nephew Juan José Ballí. He had requested that half of the island be given to his nephew, who had been helping him there. Juan José (the nephew) lived on the island from 1829 until he died in 1853. Some of the Ballí family descendants still live in the Lower Rio Grande Valley.

== Legacy ==
There is a bronze statue of Ballí at the eastern foot of the Queen Isabella Causeway. He is also remembered by Nueces County Padre Ballí Park. Gilbert Kerlin a law graduate from Harvard University had bought titles to the Island from Ballí heirs in 1938. The titles included 61,000 acres and the water segment separating Padre Island from the mainland. The heirs of Ballí filed a lawsuit against Kerlin in 1993. A Jury of their peers in 2000 ruled in favor of the heirs. 500 relatives of Padre Jose Nicolas Ballí were represented in the case. The family accused that they did not receive their share of the oil and gas revenue generated on the island based on the Original agreement. They were not paid one cent of the mineral rights they were promised. Kerlin died in 2004 at the age of 94. In 2008 the Texas Supreme Court ruled in Kerlin's favor, the verdict declared that the family of Padre Jose Nicolas had no claims on the land as they "waited too long" to file a claim.
