= 1915 Galveston hurricane =

Category 4 Atlantic hurricane

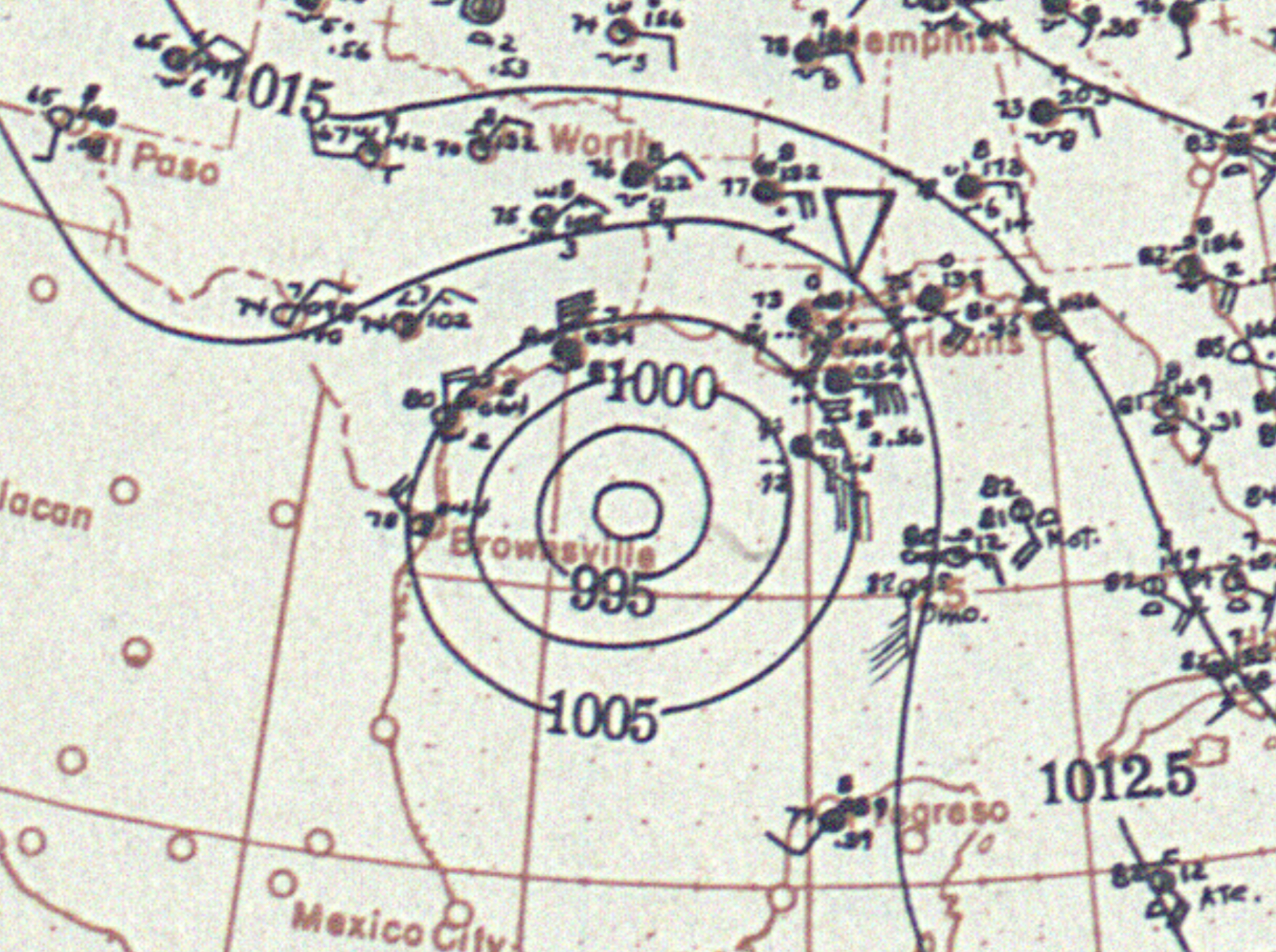
- Surface weather analysis of the hurricane on August 16, approaching landfall in southeast Texas

Meteorological history
- Formed: August 5, 1915
- Extratropical: August 20, 1915
- Dissipated: August 23, 1915

Category 4 major hurricane
- 1-minute sustained (SSHWS/NWS)
- Highest winds: 145 mph (230 km/h)
- Lowest pressure: ≤940 mbar (hPa); ≤27.76 inHg

Overall effects
- Fatalities: 403–405 direct
- Damage: ≥$30 million (1915 USD)
- Areas affected: Lesser Antilles, Hispaniola, Jamaica, Cayman Islands, Cuba, Louisiana, South Central United States, Midwestern United States
- IBTrACS
- Part of the 1915 Atlantic hurricane season

The 1915 Galveston hurricane was a tropical cyclone that caused extensive damage in the Galveston area in August 1915. Widespread damage was also documented throughout its path across the Caribbean Sea and the interior of the United States. Due to similarities in strength and trajectory, the storm drew comparisons with the deadly 1900 Galveston hurricane. While the newly completed Galveston Seawall mitigated a similar-scale disaster for Galveston, numerous fatalities occurred along unprotected stretches of the Texas coast due to the storm's 16.2 ft (4.9 m) storm surge. Overall, the major hurricane inflicted at least $30 million in damage (equivalent to $955 million in 2025) and killed 403–405 people. (Note: All monetary figures are in their 1915 values unless otherwise noted.) A demographic normalization of landfalling storms suggested that an equivalent storm in 2005 would cause $68.0 billion in damage in the United States.

Reanalyses of the Atlantic hurricane database concluded the storm formed near Cabo Verde on August 5, gradually strengthening into a hurricane as it tracked westward. However, it remained undetected by the United States Weather Bureau until it passed over the Lesser Antilles as a hurricane on August 10. The storm inflicted damage to shipping on the islands and flooded docks and streets in Martinique and Dominica. Two days later, the intensifying storm passed north of Jamaica, bringing 80–90 mph (130–140 km/h) winds to the northern coast. Significant losses were reported to the island's banana, beet, and sugar plantations, while coastal surge washed out roads and destroyed wharves; fifteen people in Jamaica were killed. Most houses and coconut trees were destroyed on Cayman Brac west of Jamaica, and substantial damage occurred across the Cayman Islands. On August 14, the hurricane clipped the western extremity of Cuba, killing fourteen. The storm's winds were estimated at 145 mph (230 km/h)—a Category 4 hurricane on the modern-day Saffir–Simpson hurricane wind scale; this was ultimately the hurricane's peak intensity.

Over the Gulf of Mexico, the hurricane caused 101 deaths, mostly from the sinking of the steamer Marowjine in the Yucatán Channel. During the early morning hours of August 17, the hurricane made landfall with winds of 130 mph (210 km/h) at San Luis Pass, Texas, approximately 26 mi (42 km) southwest of Galveston. Much of coastal Texas was affected by the storm's rough surf, with a total death toll of 275. Cities along Galveston Bay were inundated by storm surge, destroying entire towns and damaging numerous buildings. Galveston was largely protected by its seawall, but the strong waves caused extensive beach erosion that undermined 200 outlying homes. Ninety percent of homes outside the protection of the seawall on Galveston Island were destroyed. Most buildings in Houston were impacted, incurring $1 million in damage. The storm brought strong winds and torrential rainfall across East Texas, causing widespread cotton losses and damage to infrastructure—the highest rainfall total from the storm was 19.83 in (504 mm) in San Augustine, Texas.

The hurricane weakened as it tracked farther inland, degenerating into a tropical storm within a day of its landfall in Texas. A northeast curve soon followed, resulting in a track into the Ozarks and Ohio River Valley; the storm transitioned into an extratropical cyclone on August 20 over the Ozarks and dissipated over the Gulf of Saint Lawrence three days later. Heavy rainfall and significant river flooding occurred along the storm's path during this latter phase of its evolution. Levee breaches in along the White River in Arkansas and the Mississippi River in Illinois flooded entire towns. St. Louis, Missouri, recorded its rainiest 24-hour period in history, experiencing a deadly flood of the River Des Peres and Meramec River that impacted much of the city and surrounding suburbs, killing 20 people and destroying over a thousand homes.

== Meteorological history ==
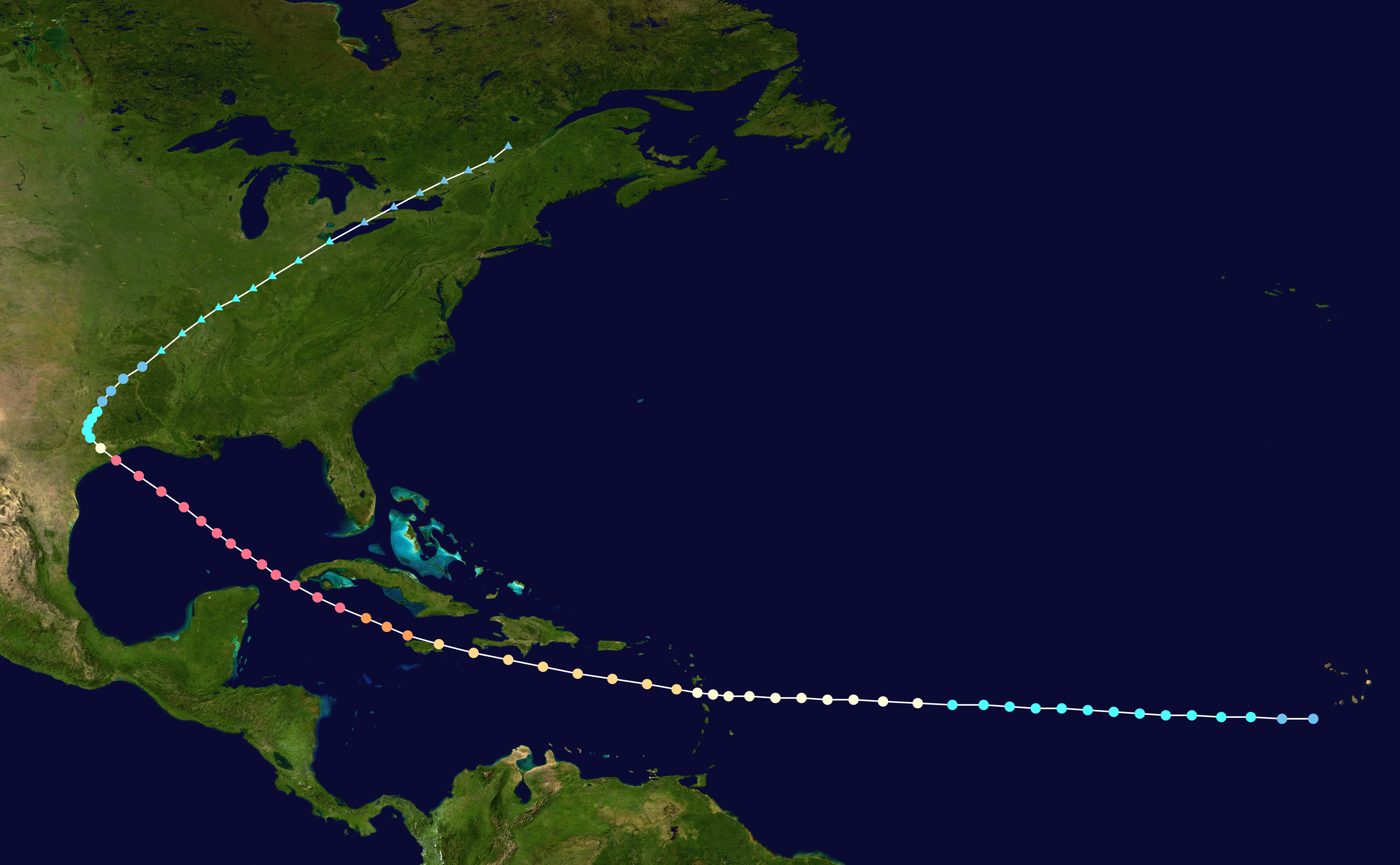
Map plotting the storm's track and intensity, according to the Saffir–Simpson scale Map key Saffir–Simpson scale Tropical depression (≤38 mph, ≤62 km/h) Tropical storm (39–73 mph, 63–118 km/h) Category 1 (74–95 mph, 119–153 km/h) Category 2 (96–110 mph, 154–177 km/h) Category 3 (111–129 mph, 178–208 km/h) Category 4 (130–156 mph, 209–251 km/h) Category 5 (≥157 mph, ≥252 km/h) Unknown Storm type Tropical cyclone Subtropical cyclone Extratropical cyclone, remnant low, tropical disturbance, or monsoon depression

On August 5, 1915, observations from Cabo Verde and the marine vicinity suggested the presence of a nearby tropical depression. On this basis, a 2008 reanalysis of the official hurricane database concluded that the depression formed by 12:00 UTC that day. Tracking west, the system gradually strengthened over the tropical Atlantic, attaining tropical storm intensity on August 6 and eventually reaching hurricane intensity three days later while well east of the Lesser Antilles. Despite the storm's power, the United States Weather Bureau was unaware of its existence for at least five days due to the sparsity of data over the open ocean; in a summary of the storm published in the Monthly Weather Review the following month, the Bureau noted that "there was nothing to indicate that conditions were favorable for the formation of a tropical storm, nor [...] was there anything pronounced to indicate its direction of progression ..." More conclusive evidence from weather observations in the Windward Islands allowed the Weather Bureau to begin monitoring the hurricane and disseminating warnings on the morning of August 10; at the time, the hurricane was situated roughly between Barbados and Dominica. The storm crossed into the Caribbean Sea the following day, passing south of St. Croix with growing intensity as indicated by rapidly falling pressures throughout the region.

Between August 12–13, the intensifying hurricane traversed the Caribbean Sea between Haiti and Jamaica with a bearing slightly north of west. Shortly after passing Jamaica, the storm became a major hurricane on the morning of August 13. On August 14, the storm moved near Cuba's Isle of Pines and across the Guanahacabibes Peninsula as a Category 4 hurricane with sustained winds of 145 mph (230 km/h). This was ultimately the storm's peak intensity as it weakened slightly once over the south-central Gulf of Mexico, though the storm still maintained Category 4 strength. At 07:00 UTC on August 17—in the early morning hours—the hurricane made landfall near San Luis Pass, approximately 26 mi (42 km) southwest of Galveston, Texas. Upon moving ashore, the hurricane had winds estimated at 130 mph (215 km/h) and a barometric pressure of 940 mbar (hPa; 27.76 inHg); these values were estimated using a peripheral pressure of 953 mbar (hPa; 28.14 inHg) measured at Velasco, Texas. At the time, the pressure measured at Texas landfall was the lowest ever measured in the United States. After moving inland, the storm quickly weakened, passing southwest of Houston, Texas, as a Category 1 hurricane before diminishing to a weak tropical storm within a day of landfall. Concurrently, the storm began to slowly curve towards the north and northeast, moving into northeast Texas on August 18. Two days later, the system transitioned into an extratropical cyclone while tracking northeast across Arkansas and southeastern Missouri; fronts extended outward from the cyclone's center. This trajectory continued before the storm's remnants were last noted in the Gulf of Saint Lawrence; HURDAT, the official database of storm paths in the Atlantic, indicates the storm dissipated after 18:00 UTC on August 23.

== Preparations ==
The United States Weather Bureau began issuing notices warning of the storm's presence on August 10, with information first sent to the Caribbean islands, followed by distribution to the Weather Bureau's stations along the Gulf and Atlantic coasts of the United States via their Arlington, Virginia, radio station. Initial forecasts predicted that the storm would cross Hispaniola and southeastern Cuba, but these landfalls did not materialize. Later anticipating that the hurricane would cross western Cuba, the Weather Bureau issued a northeast storm warning for Key West and Miami, Florida, on August 13. These warnings were briefly elevated later that day to hurricane warnings and extended northwards along to the Florida coast to Boca Grande. While these warnings were scaled down after the hurricane moved away from the state, falling pressures throughout the U.S. Gulf Coast on August 15 led the Weather Bureau to issue storm and hurricane warnings along the U.S. coast from Brownsville, Texas, to Apalachicola, Florida, eventually narrowing in extent to the Texas coast as landfall drew nearer. The head of the bureau's local office in Galveston, Texas, W. P. Stewart, cited the warnings as the sole reason for the relatively low number of fatalities in unprotected areas of the city.

Ships off of Jamaica were brought to their moorings in advance of the storm, including the United Fruit Company steamer Saramacca, whose trek to New York City was cut short by the approaching hurricane. The Havana Harbor was closed on August 13. Some residents in Key West, Florida, evacuated by train to Miami, Florida, ahead of the storm, taking refuge in Miami's hotels and boarding houses. Thousands evacuated Galveston, Texas, for the mainland, crowding train cars to capacity while automobile traffic pervaded the roads. A total of 7,000 evacuees from areas along the Galveston bay stayed in Houston during the storm, including 4,000 from Galveston proper. Interurban routes began operating special service via Galveston early on August 16 to aid evacuations, carrying 175–200 people per arrival; an estimated 2,500 people evacuated via the interurban service to Houston. Rail service between coastal cities and Houston remained in special overnight operation during the evacuation process. The final interurban railcar from Galveston with evacuees on board arrived in Houston at 7:10 p.m. CST on August 16 (00:10 UTC August 17). The 25 convicts held at a prison in Morgan's Point were relocated to the county jail in Houston. Port Aransas residents evacuated by boat to the Texas mainland. Roughly half of the combined population of Port Arthur and Beaumont evacuated, while nearly 200 residents of Port O'Connor—most of the city's population—evacuated via the St. Louis–San Francisco Railway to a hotel in Victoria on August 16. Ships along the coast were held at port to weather the hurricane.

== Impact ==
The 1915 Galveston hurricane brought gusty winds and heavy rainfall throughout its path from the Lesser Antilles into the Midwestern United States. The storm caused at least $30 million in damage, including $20 million in the United States and $10 million in Jamaica. According to research compiled by the National Hurricane Center in 1997, either 403 or 405 deaths were associated with the hurricane throughout its path.

=== Caribbean Sea ===
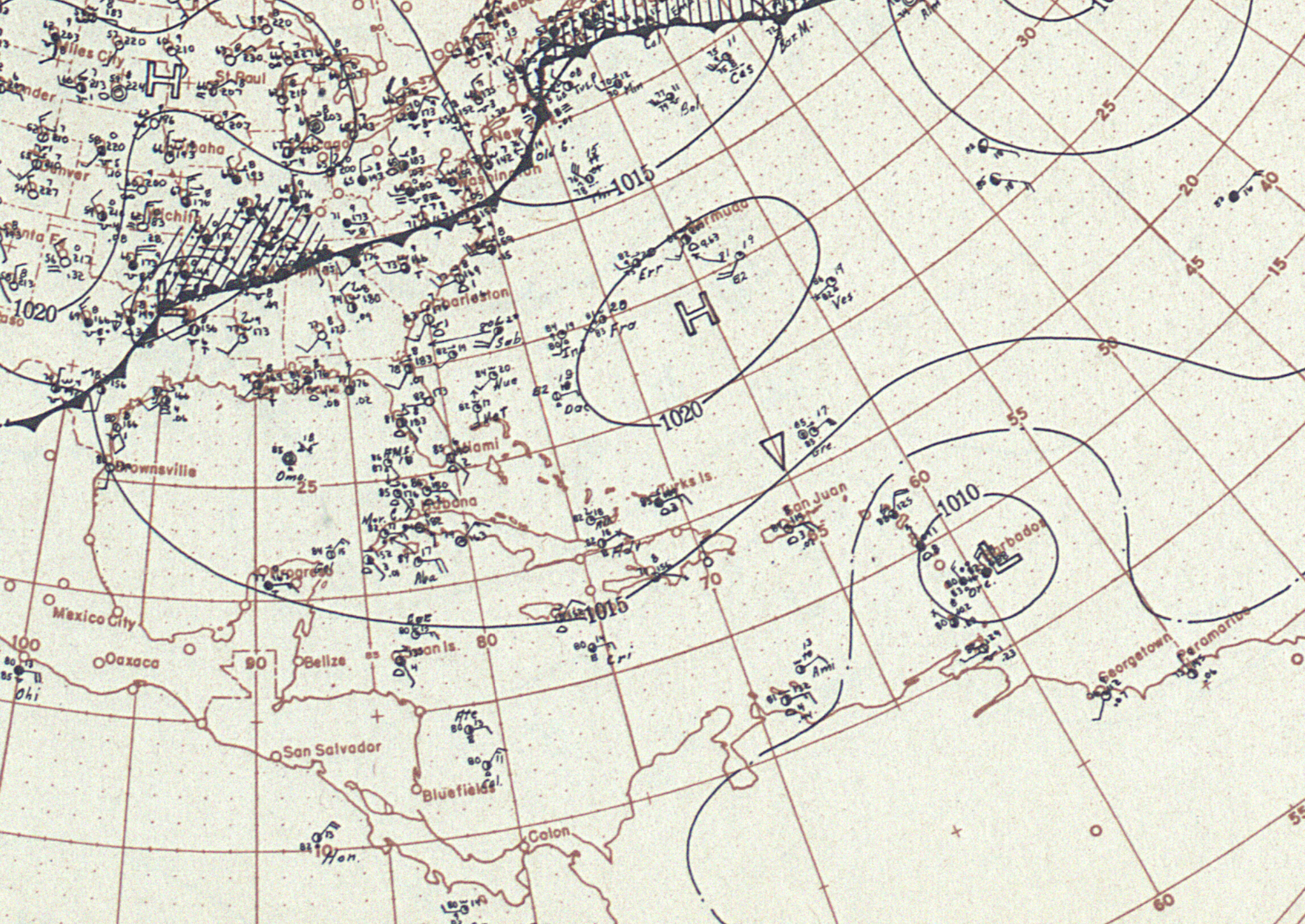
Synoptic weather map of the hurricane approaching the Lesser Antilles on August 10

Damage caused by the hurricane east of Hispaniola was generally minor and limited to shipping. Docks were flooded at Fort-de-France in Martinique by the high tides. Telephone lines in the island's interior were downed. Other islands in the Lesser Antilles reported "some damage to small shipping", as summarized by the Monthly Weather Review. At Kingstown in Saint Vincent, two vessels were grounded inland and several lighters damaged or destroyed; debris was littered on the harbor beach. Strong winds buffeted the island of Dominica on August 10, where heavy rains caused rivers to rise and flood streets. Roseau was impacted by a power outage as telephone and electric poles were downed. Damage to buildings in Rouseau was limited to siding and fencing. Crops sustained some losses, particularly limes. Dwellings in some communities were either destroyed or damaged. Telecommunication lines were also downed in Saint Thomas and a schooner was grounded in Saint Kitts. Crops were damaged in the southwestern Haiti, and communications between Port-au-Prince and the United States were cut off.

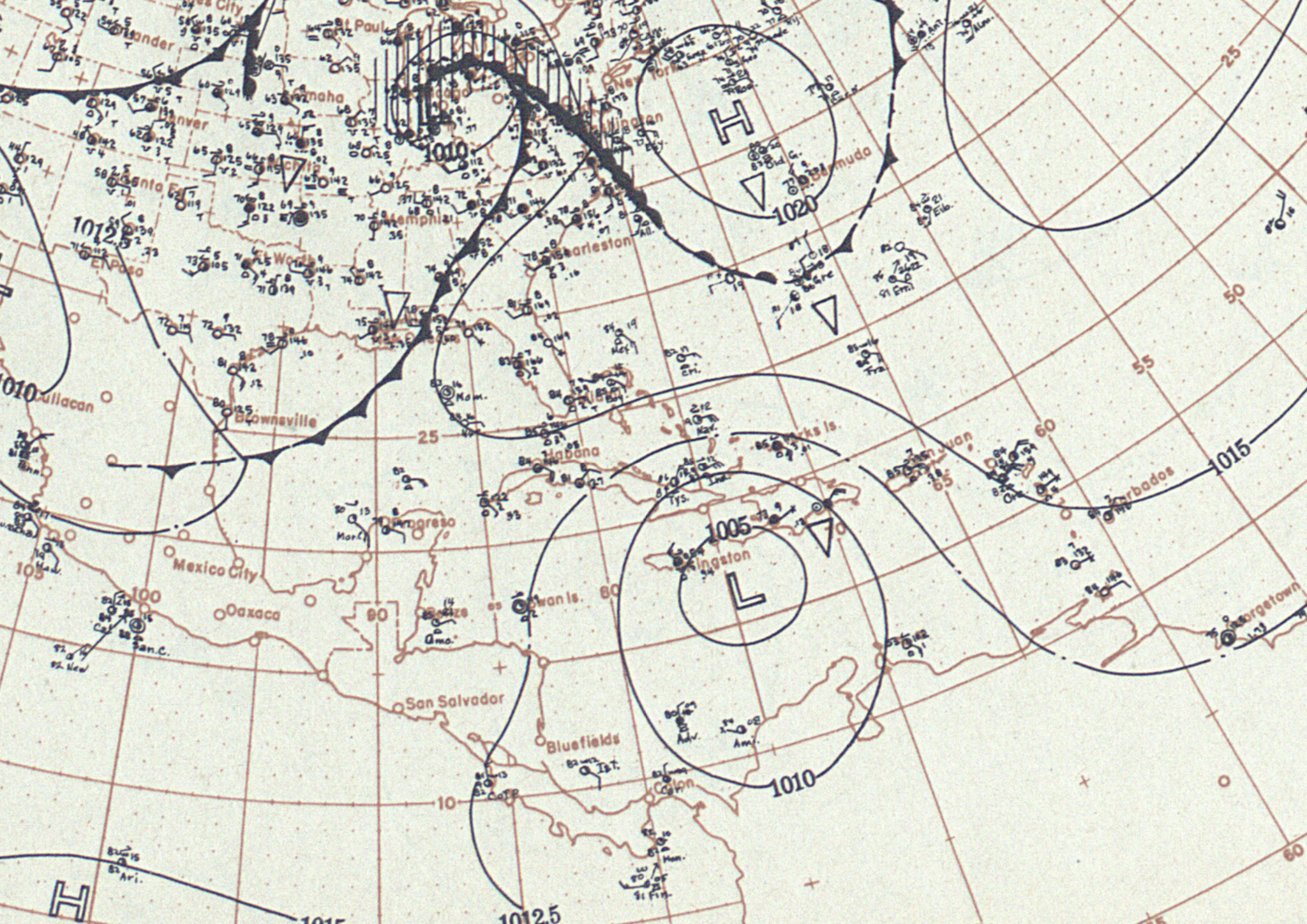
Synoptic weather map of the hurricane over the Caribbean Sea, nearing Jamaica on August 12

Three-fourths of the 270 houses on Cayman Brac were destroyed, leaving 1,800 people destitute. All homes were destroyed in Stake Bay after the storm surge penetrated 0.5 mi (0.8 km) inland; collapsing walls killed one child there. Nearly all of the island's coconut trees were also destroyed, while half of coconut trees were downed on Little Cayman. All buildings in Little Cayman were destroyed. Several schooners were also driven ashore by the storm, and another bearing oil and gasoline cargo was lost. Ten people were killed after the schooner Curaçao bound for Grand Cayman with lumber sank just offshore. Hundreds of cattle and swine were killed on Grand Cayman. Recently completed government buildings there were displaced from their foundations.

Western extents of Cuba were severely affected by the hurricane, with the storm's effects classified as Category 3 hurricane impacts. Fourteen people were killed in the country. All homes in Cape San Antonio collapsed, along with a lighthouse, radio station, and steel tower. The Weather Bureau's meteorological equipment stationed on the cape was entirely destroyed; the weather station had been recently established for monitoring the 1915 hurricane season, and documented the calm of the hurricane's eye. Two schooners were destroyed by the storm without fatalities. Though initial reports indicated several hundred thousands of dollars of damage was wrought to crops on the Isle of Pines, this figure was revised downwards to $50,000, stemming from the manageable loss of one-third of the island's grapefruit crop. Winds in Havana topped out at 56 mph (90 km/h).

==== Jamaica ====
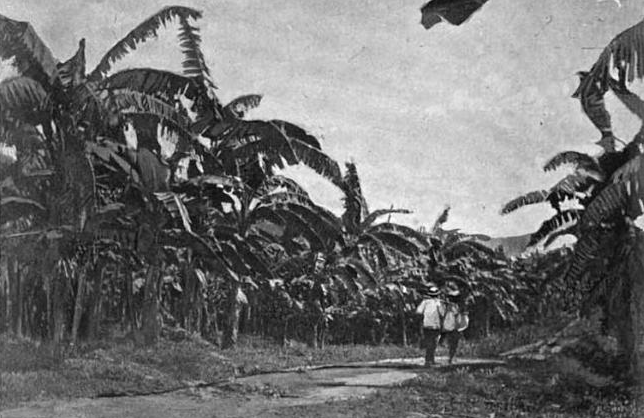
Banana plantations in Jamaica were hard hit by the hurricane.

The hurricane passed north of Jamaica on the night of August 12–13 as an intensifying hurricane, with winds reaching 80–90 mph (130–140 km/h) along the island's northern shores. The storm inflicted an estimated $10 million in damage in Jamaica, destroying banana, beet, and sugar plantations on the northern and northeastern parts of the island nation; however, coconut trees throughout the island largely withstood the hurricane. Fifteen people were killed, primarily by drowning. The damage along the immediate coastline was more severe than the 1903 Jamaica hurricane despite the weaker intensity. Communications were cut in the outlying districts. Along the coast, rough surf ahead of the storm sank one boat and damaged several others at Port Royal. The earliest gusts damaged banana plantations in Saint Thomas Parish as the storm's fringes brought strong winds and showers to the eastern end of the island on the evening of August 13; the parish ultimately lost 70 percent of its banana crop. Significant damage was wrought to the parishes of Saint Mary and Portland. Coastal extents of Portland Parish from Manchionel to Port Antonio saw significant damage, leaving many families homeless or otherwise destitute. The coastal railway sustained "unprecedented" damage, with all segments of track nearest to the coastline destroyed. The wharf at Manchionel was destroyed and the main coastal road damaged at several points. Thirty families were rendered homeless and four people were killed at Buff Bay. A 200 yd (180 m) stretch of seawall there was destroyed by the wave action. Port Antonio proper sustained relatively minor damage from the storm compared to the 1903 hurricane.

In Saint Mary Parish, hundreds of homes were destroyed at Port Maria and Annotto Bay. Wharves on the Port Maria seafront were badly damaged, with others washed into the sea. Several ships were destroyed and others severely damaged; one boat was left atop a building on the town's Main Street. A hundred buildings were destroyed. The damage toll for the town was estimated at £20,000, with as high as 99 percent loss of bananas locally; the banana crop was expected not to recover for 8–9 months. Between 250 and 300 people were displaced in Port Maria, requiring temporary shelter at the town hall and courthouse. The main thoroughfare connecting Port Maria and Annotto Bay was damaged, while the primary road connecting Annotto Bay and Port Antonio was washed away. The worst damage in Annotto Bay was along the coast, where several wharves were destroyed; five of the six lighters moored at Annotto Bay were torn apart. Sections of the town were washed away by the hurricane. In low-lying areas, all homes were destroyed, leaving hundreds of people homeless. The town's post office was flooded and boats were pushed atop wharves and destroyed. A 600 ft (180 m) stretch of railway nearby was torn by the storm surge. Early reports from The Daily Gleaner indicated 3–4 people in Annotto Bay were missing. In Saint Catherine Parish, banana trees were snapped by the storm's winds and homes were unroofed; an estimated 40–50 percent of banana trees in the parish were lost. Complete loss of bananas was reported in Appleton, Balaclava, and Christiana, with a total loss of all fruit at Cambridge, Jamaica.

To a lesser extent, Saint Ann, Saint James, and Trelawny along Jamaica's northern shores were also impacted by the storm. Many pimento and mature banana crops in Saint Ann's Bay were lost. Wharves and coastal buildings in the town were damaged. On the south side of the island, ackee, breadfruit, mangoes, and other tree crops were blown down in Saint Andrew Parish. The Rio Cobre at Riversdale flooded its banks, inundating nearby roads. The capital city, Kingston, experienced winds of 50 mph (80 km/h), but avoided the storm's worst impacts, resulting in slight damage limited to fallen fences and trees. Gusty winds also reached Montego Bay without considerable consequence. Some railways were partially inundated, including the Kingston to Montego Bay railway between Cambridge and Appleton.

=== Yucatán Channel and Gulf of Mexico ===
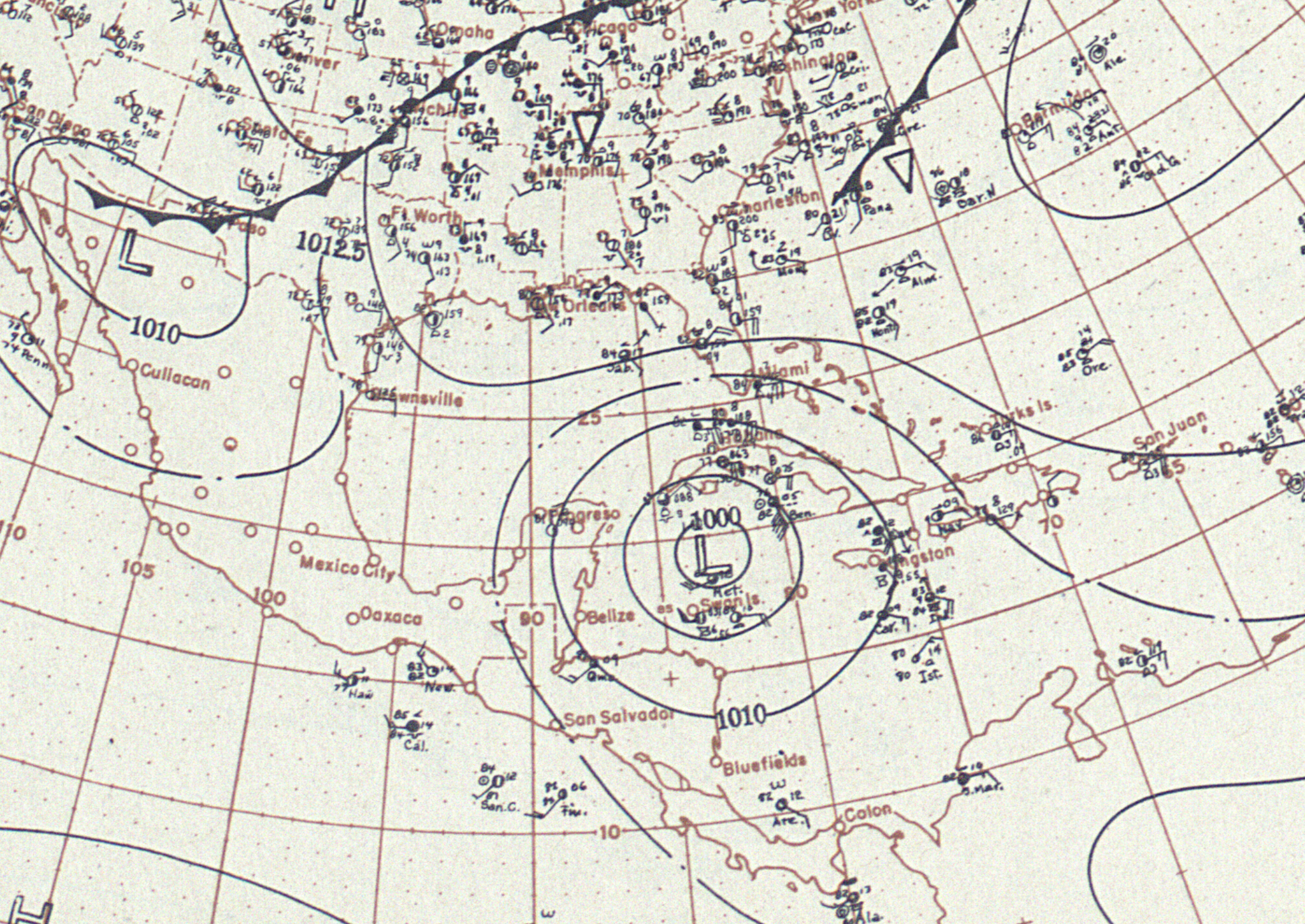
Synoptic weather map of the hurricane in the western Caribbean Sea, approaching the Yucatán Channel on August 14

In the Yucatán Channel the hurricane sank the U.S. steamer Marowijne, bound from British Honduras. Despite sufficient radio capabilities, the ship was lost with the presumed deaths of all 96 passengers and crew. Efforts were made by the United Fruit Company to rescue the missing people, but such efforts were called off on August 25. Found marine wreckage was later associated with the ship, confirming its sinking. In the northern Gulf of Mexico, a schooner sank several miles south of Mobile, Alabama, killing three. Off the coast of Pensacola, Florida, there were two more fatalities when a fishing boat ran aground. Two marines on the battleship USS New Hampshire (BB-25) en route for Veracruz, Mexico, were washed overboard and drowned off the Florida coast. The battleship USS Louisiana (BB-19), traveling in tandem with the New Hampshire, was also caught in the storm, though neither ship was damaged. In all, the hurricane left 101 people dead in the Gulf of Mexico and Yucatán Channel.

=== United States ===
Costliest U.S. Atlantic hurricanes, 1900–2017 Direct economic losses, normalized to societal conditions in 2018
Rank	Hurricane	Season	Cost
1	4 "Miami"	1926	$235.9 billion
2	4 "Galveston"	1900	$138.6 billion
3	3 Katrina	2005	$116.9 billion
4	4 "Galveston"	1915	$109.8 billion
5	5 Andrew	1992	$106.0 billion
6	ET Sandy	2012	$73.5 billion
7	3 "Cuba–Florida"	1944	$73.5 billion
8	4 Harvey	2017	$62.2 billion
9	3 "New England"	1938	$57.8 billion
10	4 "Okeechobee"	1928	$54.4 billion
Main article: List of costliest Atlantic hurricanes

The 1915 Galveston hurricane made landfall near San Luis Pass, Texas, along the end of West Bay, 26 mi (42 km) southwest of Galveston, at 2 a.m. (07:00 UTC) on August 17. Maximum sustained winds were estimated at 130 mph (210 km/h), making the storm a low-end Category 4 hurricane on the Saffir–Simpson hurricane wind scale. These maximum winds radially extended 30 mi (48 km) out from the center of the storm. Storm surge heights peaked at 16.2 ft (4.9 m), with wave crests reaching 21 ft (6.4 m). The hurricane's most significant impacts occurred in Galveston and surrounding areas where 122 people were killed; 69 of these fatalities occurred due to the sinking of three ships. Another 102 persons were listed as missing, though the Monthly Weather Review indicated that "it was probable that many of these were later accounted for".

Widespread flooding occurred throughout the storm's track across the United States, primarily towards the north and northwest of the center of circulation. The rainfall at any one point within the storm's swath lasted 36–72 hours. The largest contributor to the hurricane's damage toll was ship-related: several hundreds of vessels were wrecked offshore East Texas and western Louisiana. According to the Monthly Weather Review for August 1915, the hurricane caused an estimated $50 million in damage, though the Weather Bureau noted this figure was likely an overestimate. In the 1916 Report of the Chief of the Weather Bureau, the Weather Bureau estimated $20 million in damage from the hurricane in the country. In 2018, an analysis of historical U.S. landfalls suggested that a storm striking the same areas as the 1915 hurricane would inflict $109.8 billion in damage when normalizing for 2018 demographics and inflation.

==== Florida and northern Gulf Coast ====
Although the hurricane did not make landfall on Florida as initially feared, the outer rainbands of the storm still produced tropical storm force winds and scattered downpours. Gusty winds spread across South Florida, with a 38 mph (61 km/h) wind reported in Key West and a 32 mph (51 km/h) wind reported in Miami. The hurricane's northernmost showers dropped heavy rains over Key West. The strongest gusts reached 52 mph (84 km/h) at Sand Key, located 8 mi (13 km) southwest of Key West. Damaged ships crippled by the hurricane in the eastern Gulf of Mexico were brought to Key West. The storm's fringes also impacted the northern U.S. Gulf Coast. Winds reached 40 mph (64 km/h) in Mobile, Alabama. A Mallory ocean liner was grounded on a sand bar offshore due to the winds. A thunderstorm in Waveland, Mississippi, killed one person and washed out 1,500 yd (1,400 m) of road along the beach.

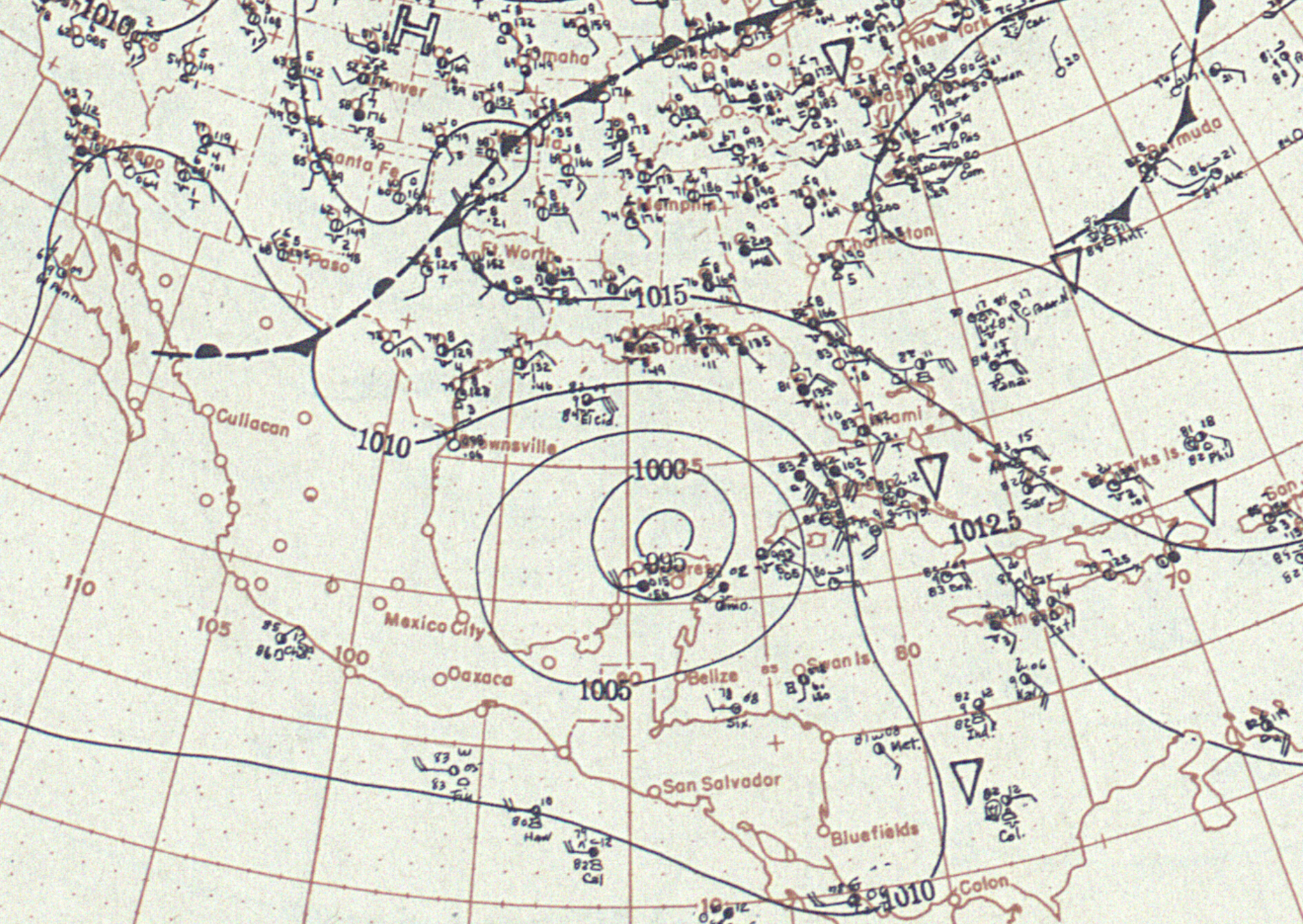
Synoptic weather map of the hurricane over the Gulf of Mexico on August 15

Winds topped out at 50 mph (80 km/h) along the coast of Louisiana. A squall associated with the hurricane capsized a yacht with eight others on board in Lake Pontchartrain, drowning one person. Grand Isle was flooded under 6 ft (1.8 m) of water. All wharves and boathouses in Grand Lake were destroyed by the storm surge. The storm's waves also left 200 people stranded on Marsh Island. The southern half of Cameron Parish was inundated in saltwater, killing 70–90 percent of cattle and damaging many homes. Heavy rainfall in the state's western parishes flooded some of the area's smaller streams. Compromised telephone wires due to strong winds in the Shreveport area put 400 telephones out of service. Damage from the hurricane in Louisiana amounted to no greater than $1 million and was largely limited to rice and livestock amid the coastal marshes.

==== Texas ====
According to the Atlantic Oceanographic and Meteorological Laboratory, the 1915 Galveston hurricane produced Category 4 hurricane impacts along the northern Texas coast (from Matagorda Bay to the state border with Louisiana), with Category 1 hurricane impacts along the central Texas coast (from Corpus Christi to Matagorda Bay). A total of 275 deaths were recorded in Texas, including 206 on land and 69 at sea.

===== Galveston Island =====
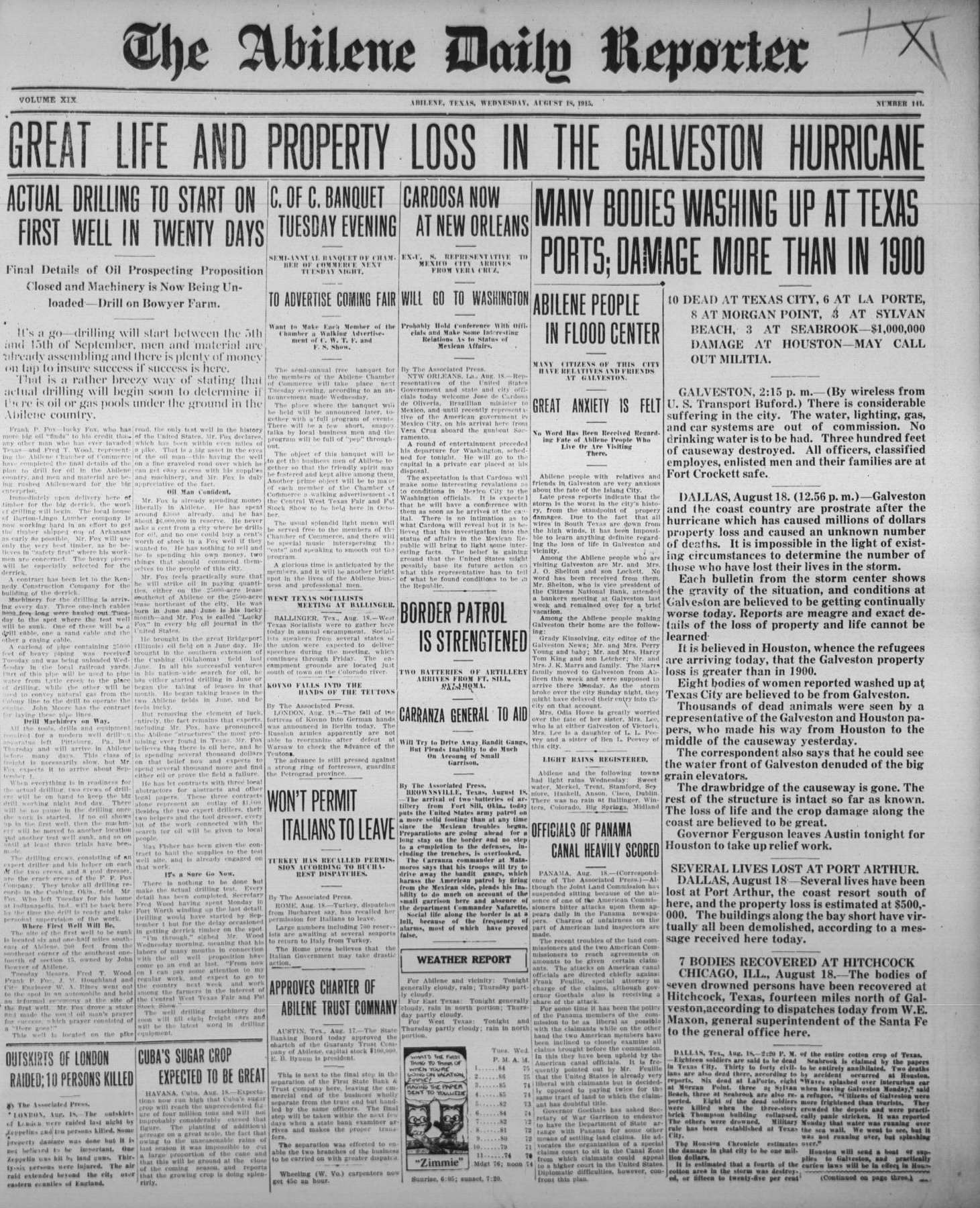
The Abilene Daily Reporter coverage of the hurricane on August 18

The 1915 hurricane was the first major hurricane in the Galveston area since the construction of the Galveston Seawall following the 1900 Galveston hurricane, providing the first substantial test of the artificial barrier. Initial reports in The Houston Post drew comparisons between the strengths and paths of the 1915 hurricane and the 1900 hurricane. The Associated Press reported that storm refugees initially believed "Galveston's property loss [would] be greater than it was in 1900". Galveston mayor Lewis Fisher also tentatively estimated that the total property damage from the 1915 hurricane would be costlier. Although the 1915 hurricane lasted longer than the 1900 hurricane and was of comparable intensity, the seawall and timely warnings prevented a disaster of a similar scale. In their last received report before landfall, the Galveston News asserted that "the sea wall built to protect the city has stood the test".

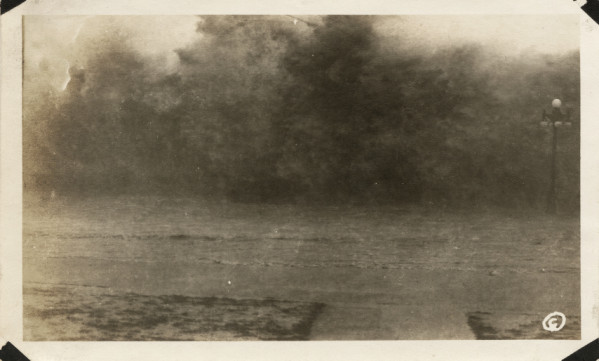
Waves against the Galveston Seawall on the afternoon of August 16

Located at the core of the hurricane's impacts, Galveston incurred roughly $6 million in damage and reported 11 fatalities. Swells from the hurricane began reaching Galveston on the morning of August 15, rising steadily before rising and roughening significantly after the evening of August 17. Rail service in southeastern Texas was disrupted as the storm made landfall; a train from the Southern Pacific Transportation Company bound for Galveston was stopped in Seabrook and overnight sleeping cars destined for Houston from Galveston did not complete their treks. The last Galveston and Houston Electric Railway interurban car from the evacuating people in Galveston was stranded in Virginia Point after a power line was cut by the storm.

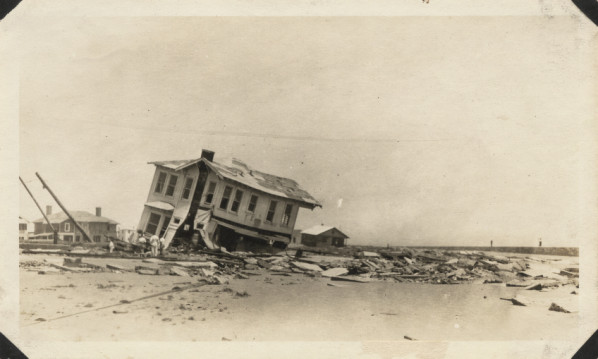
Wrecked houses on the east end of Galveston near Seawall Boulevard

During the hurricane's passage, many Galveston residents took refuge in public buildings, including an estimated 5,000 people at the Union Depot. Streetcar, electric, and gas service were all suspended as the storm made landfall. Three fires during the storm exacerbated the damage, partially burning three buildings and causing more than $100,000 in losses. Galveston officials heavily censored initial reporting from local media in order to curtail the spread of false rumors, rejecting most telegraph queries for information. Telecommunications from the Galveston News were cut after 8:20 p.m. CST on August 16 (01:20 UTC August 17), with the last surviving communications wires downed in the city by 9:00 p.m. CST on August 16 (02:00 UTC August 17). The first reports from Galveston after the storm emerged on August 19.

The great granite structure erected after the calamity of 1900, grimly met and conquered the raging seas of the gulf and hurled them back defiantly when they came. Our citizenship is buoyantly [sic] cheerful because of the demonstrated impregnability of their protective works in this, the supermost test of their effectiveness.

— Telegram prepared by Galveston citizens published in The Houston Post, August 19, 1915

No official record of the storm surge height at Galveston was preserved as the tide gauges operated by the United States Geological Survey and United States Army Corps of Engineers were destroyed by the hurricane. However, measurements of high water marks by the Army Corps of Engineers at the intersection of 20th and Strand Streets indicated the maximum water level reached 11.965 ft (3.647 m) above the mean low tide height, suggesting water levels above those during the 1900 hurricane. Streets in the city's retail district were first submerged after 6 p.m. CST on August 16 (23:00 UTC), with roads eventually submerged under 5 ft (1.5 m) of water at the height of the storm; the inundation peaked at 6 ft (1.8 m) at the city's Union Depot.

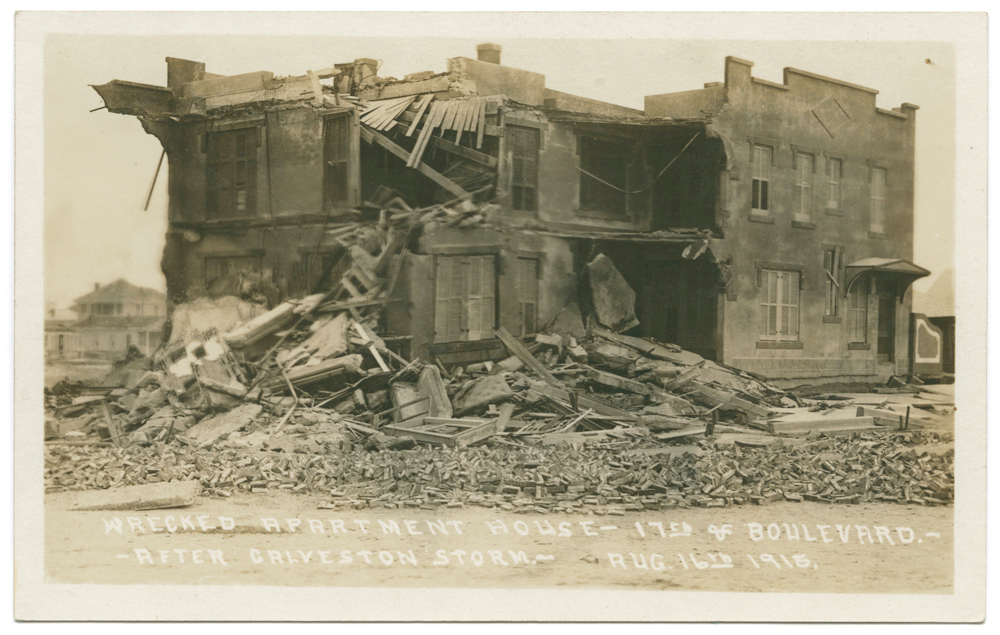
Extensive damage to an Apartment House after the hurricane

Floodwaters remained on the city streets before receding on the morning of August 18. Offshore, a 21,000 lb (9,500 kg) buoy with a 9,750 lb (4,420 kg) anchor and chain was blown 10 mi (16 km) west by the hurricane. The 300 ft (91 m) wide beach extending outwards from the Galveston Seawall was completely eroded by the storm surge, deposited in an offshore sandbar; the beach has only partially recovered since then. Two lighthouses, the Redfish Bar and Galveston Jetty lights, were damaged. A total of 24 vessels capsized offshore Galveston. Most ships in Galveston's wharves weathered the hurricane without much damage. The wharves themselves generally sustained minor damage and all were repairable.

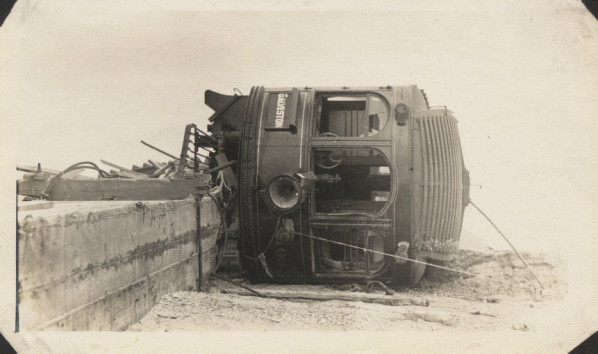
Texan railways were disrupted by the hurricane, including interurban routes used to transport evacuees

However, piers 10 and 21 were severely affected and among several destroyed piers. The USAT McClellan was torn adrift from pier 12 and grounded upon Pelican Island. Sheds in the area were also destroyed. Houses closest to the Gulf coast, many of weak structural integrity, saw the severest impacts from the storm. All homes near the Seawall Boulevard east of 20th Street were destroyed. The rough seas eroded the underlying sand beneath buildings, causing their collapse. Other structures along the coast were also destroyed, including bath houses, fishing piers, and pavilions. Along Tremont Street, beach resort structures and a casino were destroyed, primarily by stones torn loose from the seawall's riprap. A 20-block length of Seawall Boulevard was destroyed by this erosion.

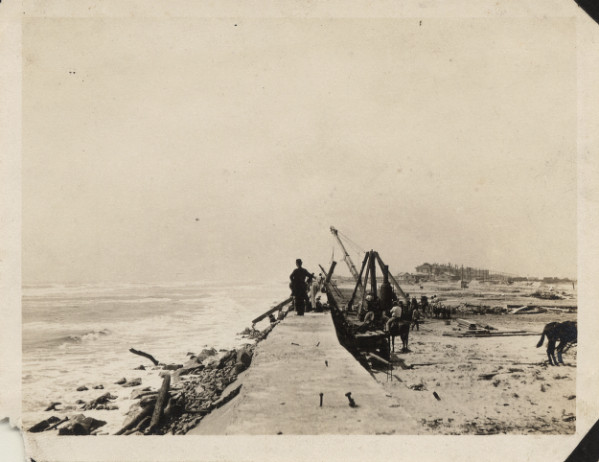
Crews replacing riprap at the Galveston Seawall

Pavement along the road was destroyed between 6th and 18th Streets. However, the seawall itself largely held intact, with structural damage limited to two chips near 39th Street where a four-masted schooner, the Crockett, dragged two anchors into the wall. The ship lodged onto the wall during the storm, resulting in the Crockett's disintegration with debris spread across Galveston's West End. The force of the waves dislodged 20-short-ton (18,000 kg) granite blocks and carried them into the city streets. A six-block-long stretch of street railway was destroyed. Although the seawall was designed with a 300–400 ft (91–122 m) interior sand buffer sloping upwards to the city, only small patches were augmented by a surface layer of soil or sod. This allowed additional erosion behind the seawall, damaging 200 homes, of which most were declared uninhabitable and some destroyed. Southeastern parts of Galveston were covered by 2–5 ft (0.61–1.52 m) of sand.

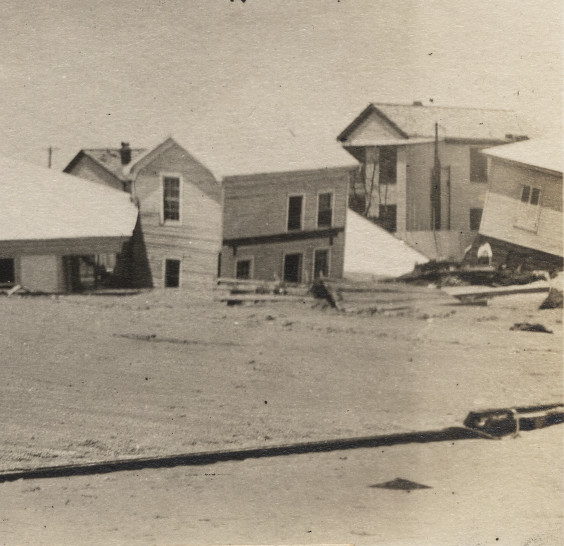
Houses in Galveston undermined by loose sand

The highest winds in Galveston were recorded at around 2:30 a.m. CST on August 17 (07:30 UTC), including maximum sustained winds of 93 mph (150 km/h) and a peak gust of 120 mph (190 km/h). Strong winds shattered windows and blew down fences, outbuildings, and trees. In the city's business district, awnings and signs were damaged. Some tin roofs were torn by the winds, but overall wind damage in the district was minor. However, many business storehouses had their stocks damaged by flooding, particularly those containing dry goods.

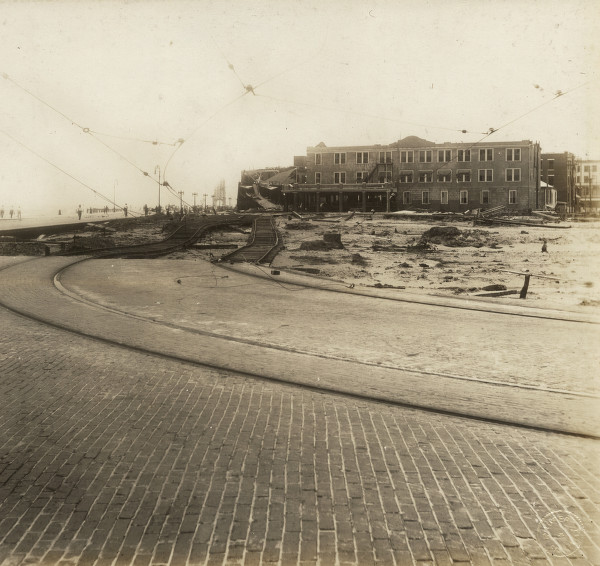
Galveston's Electric Company tracks through City Park adjacent to Hotel Galvez sustained significant damage from the hurricane.

The city's water supply was cut after sections of the water main sourcing water from springs in Alta Loma were destroyed. The ends of the Galveston Causeway were reduced to their concrete foundations, necessitating $500,000 in repairs. The causeway's drawbridge was also destroyed, along with 300 ft (91 m) of the main bridge structure. Two interurban cars laid at rest at the destroyed drawbridge, partially submerged underwater. The city lost most of its telecommunication capacity when its Marconi wireless station was destroyed, limiting telegraph service to radio via the USAT Buford. Military installations at Fort Crockett were heavily damaged, with much of the grounds eroded and forts destroyed; damage there totaled over $500,000. Four soldiers stationed at the fort were killed. At least 90 percent of the 250 homes on Galveston Island outside the seawall's protection were destroyed. Throughout the island, there were 42 fatalities outside of Galveston. Port Bolivar was largely destroyed, and its port was mostly not rebuilt. Sixty people sought refuge at the Point Bolivar Light during the storm.

===== Southeastern Texas =====
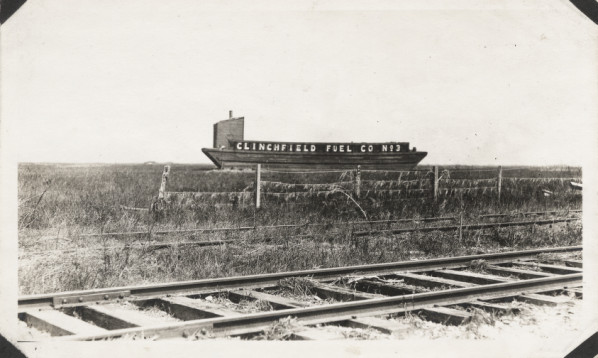
Storm surge grounded ships well inland, including this coal barge near Texas City

Rough seas were reported throughout the Texas coast ahead of the storm on August 16, with waves cresting 20 ft (6.1 m) high. Coastal inundation of city streets was reported in all towns between Corpus Christi and Orange. Ten houses were destroyed in Victoria. Telephone service in the city was disrupted, rendering 165 telephones out of commission. The agitated waters of Matagorda Bay flooded the Matagorda Peninsula a day before landfall, and nearby Freeport observed their highest tide in many years. Many oil derricks in the area were destroyed. The life-saving station in Freeport near the mouth of the Brazos River was destroyed, killing 19 people. Upstream the Brazos River in Brazoria, strong winds damaged crops, fences, and trees. Most crops in Matagorda County withstood the storm, though 25–35 percent of the rice crop was lost, including Blue Rose, Honduras, and Japan varieties. Aside from cotton losses, Port Lavaca along Matagorda Bay suffered light damage to property. Bathhouses in Port Aransas were destroyed.

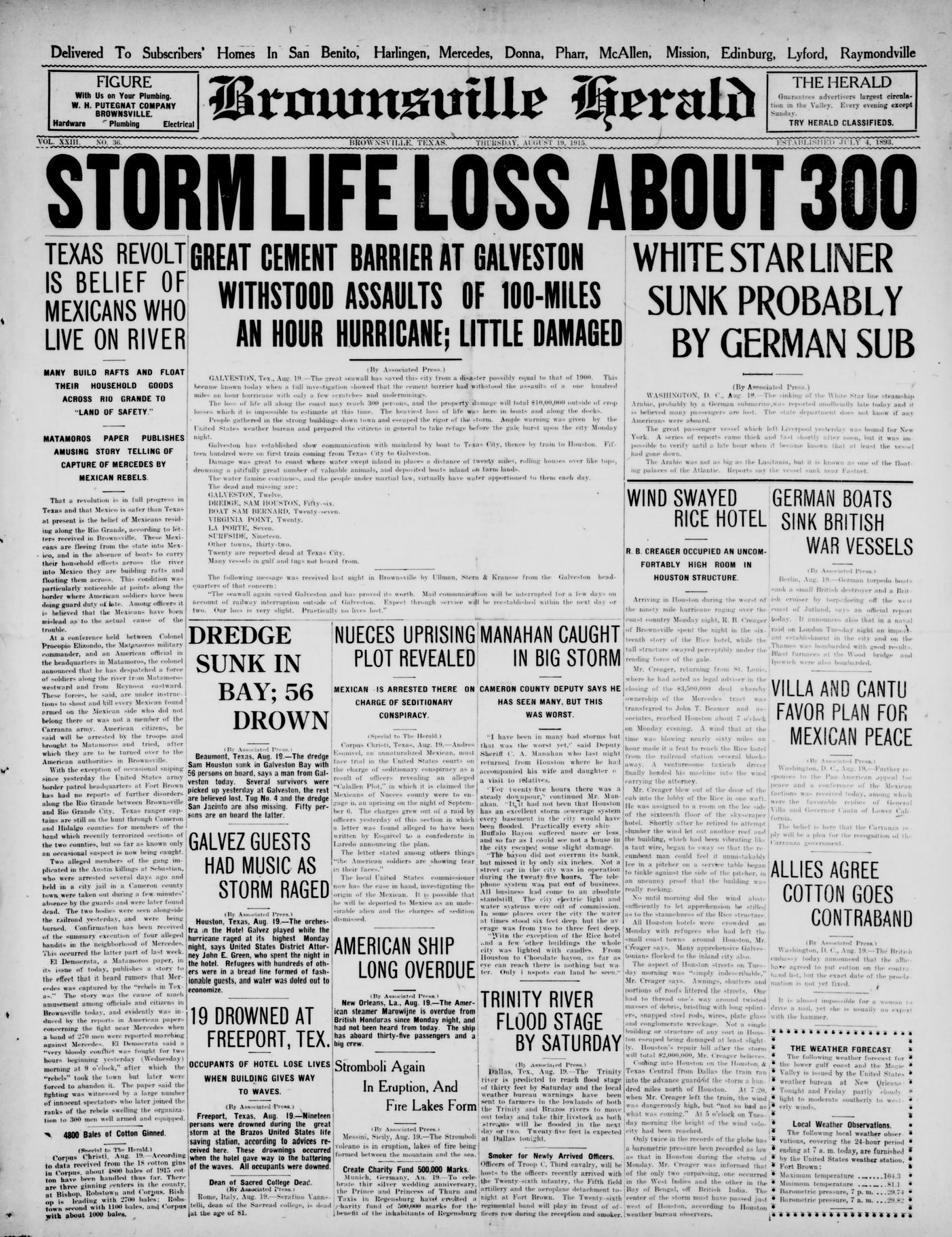
The Brownsville Herald coverage of the hurricane on August 19

Several towns between Houston and Galveston, especially those along Galveston Bay, sustained heavy damage. Storm surge along the bay's coast swept away 85 homes at Seabrook, killing two; the Houston Chronicle described Seabrook as being "entirely annihilated". At Virginia Point, 15.3 ft (4.7 m) high storm surge destroyed the local hotel, killing 21 people. Lynchburg was reported in The Houston Post to have been "wiped off [the] map". Buildings were significantly damaged or destroyed in Dickinson, La Marque, League City, and Webster, though no fatalities occurred at these locales. A hundred bales of cotton, skiffs, small craft, and a buoy littered the Hitchcock area, accompanied by floodwaters that submerged railway tracks, preventing access to the Galveston Causeway. The flooding remained 5 ft (1.5 m) deep and inside homes the morning after landfall. The bodies of seven people were recovered in the city. At the height of the storm, winds there were estimated in excess of 100 mph (160 km/h). Many freight cars were knocked onto their sides, with one blown off of its tracks. Another seven people were killed in the Morgan's Point area due to storm surge; one measurement of the tides there indicated that seas were 14 ft (4.3 m) higher than mean low tide. Hundreds of dead cattle and other animals washed ashore along the Morgan's Point bayfront. Six people were killed in La Porte and three in nearby Sylvan Beach.

Texas City was hard-hit by the hurricane, sustaining $400,000 in damage and the loss of 18 lives. Eight were killed following the collapse of the top two stories of a recently completed building. An estimated 250 people took shelter in the building, though a majority left when the building was first unroofed. An estimated 150 buildings, primarily small frame residences and structures, collapsed; eight businesses were destroyed. Some businesses and residences were unroofed, and while most remained standing, many frame buildings were torn from their foundations and lay afloat in the floodwaters. In total, damage to homes and businesses was estimated as between $35,000–$100,000. Damage to refineries amounted to $75,000 and losses to warehouses and piers amounted to $50,000. Total losses to the Texas City Transportation Company's shipping facilities was estimated at $200,000, including the loss of three large oil tanks and coastal installations. Several dredges were damaged and grounded at Texas City. Floodwaters 4.5–6 ft (1.4–1.8 m) deep swept the city streets. The U.S. Army camp in Texas City was destroyed, with the loss of most tents and wooden structures; ten soldiers were killed there. The dredge Sam Houston capsized in a channel 7 mi (11 km) off of Texas City, drowning 56–60 people; there were only three survivors. Two oil tank steamers were grounded between Texas City and Virginia Point while numerous small craft sank.

Sabine Lake overflowed its banks and inundated Port Arthur, flooding all one-story buildings; one street was submerged under 8–10 ft (2.4–3.0 m) of water. Residents sought refuge in the upper floors of the city's main buildings. An oil refinery in the western part of the city was flooded with 8 ft (2.4 m) of water, leaving its 150 workers stranded atop the site's buildings. At the height of the storm on the morning of August 17, winds reached 90 mph (140 km/h) in Port Arthur, lasting nearly two hours before subsiding. Strong winds blew away an entire telephone station. Beaumont lost all telecommunication capabilities, including service to over 1,500 telephones. The Southwestern Telegraph and Telephone Company estimated at least $50,000 in damage was dealt to its assets in the city. A Catholic church, frame buildings, and a grandstand were destroyed, while hundreds of windows were blown out by the hurricane. The city also lost all power during the night of landfall. With the exception of one, all oil derricks at the Sour Lake oilfield were destroyed. The surge pushed a 50,000-barrel oil tank inland into Nederland. Winds reached 65 mph (105 km/h) in Sabine Pass, where six people were killed; another three were killed in Beaumont. Widespread damage amounting to $25,000 occurred in Orange. Six smokestacks at a paper mill collapsed, damaging roofing below. Other factory smokestacks around the city also collapsed, damaging adjacent structures. Several ships held at port were damaged and some sank. Elsewhere in the southeastern Texas counties of Jefferson and Liberty, strong winds blew down corn, cotton, and rice crops, accounting for most of the damage in those counties.

===== Houston =====
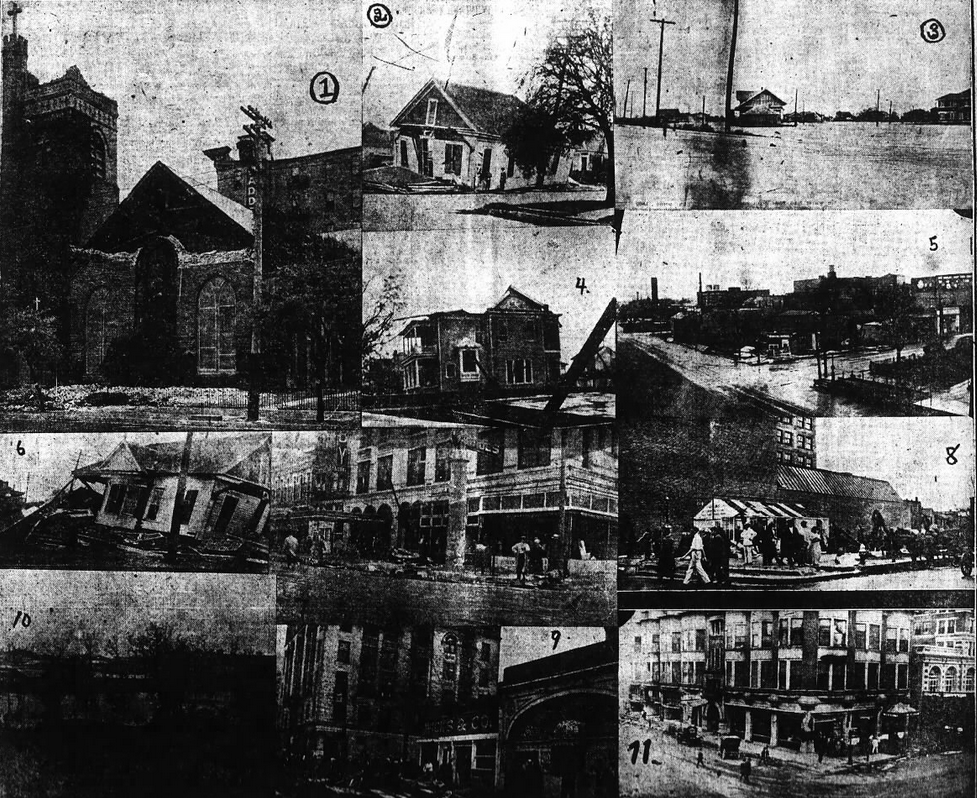
Most buildings in Houston were damaged by strong winds.

A peak wind of 80 mph (130 km/h) was estimated in Houston at 8 a.m. CST on August 17 (13:00 UTC). The hurricane set a record for the most rainfall recorded in a 24-hour period in Houston with 7.18 in (182 mm) of rain. Most buildings in the city sustained some form of damage, amounting to a $1 million damage toll. Plateglass windows and business signage in Downtown Houston were destroyed. Vegetation in the city's residential districts was damaged. The downed trees and live power lines lay strewn across the city streets. Streetlights were turned off during the storm to reduce the risk of electrocutions. One person was killed after stepping upon a downed power line. The Southwestern Telegraph and Telephone Company conservatively estimated the damage to its communication lines in Houston at $100,000, making it the most disruptive incident in the company's history. Roughly half of the 20,000 phone lines in the city were inoperative, with an average of 200 lines knocked out of commission per hour.

The severest effects in Houston were realized in the shopping district, where store fronts were destroyed and the associated glass and wood debris scattered over several blocks. Numerous windows were blown out of many buildings while other buildings partially collapsed. The now penetrable façades allowed rainfall to cause additional interior water damage. Some of the wind-blown debris produced additional damage to buildings that otherwise withstood the winds themselves; pieces of slate from a Baptist church shattered nearly every window on the ground and mezzanine floors of a nearby furniture store, with windows broken up to the building's seventh story; total damage to the store was enumerated at $7,000. In the eastern parts of Houston around Harrisburg Road, homes were unroofed and large trees uprooted. Along Washington Avenue, chimneys were torn from houses and fences were either blown down or destroyed by fallen trees. West End Park suffered extensive damage with the roof and upper deck of the baseball field destroyed. Debris was widespread in South Houston, especially in areas with flat terrain and lacking in vegetation. Thousands of dollars of damage was wrought to homes and other buildings. Damage to schools across the Houston area amounted to $15,000. Virtually all roads in Harris County were damaged, resulting in a $100,000 toll.

===== Inland Texas =====
Winds of 60 mph (97 km/h) reached as far west as San Antonio. Crops across half of Texas were damaged by the storm as it pressed inland, including the loss of all open cotton and most late-season corn and rice. Many partly grown cotton bolls failed to open due to bruising from the storm, and roughly a quarter of all field cotton was lost. However, open ranges and forage crops benefited from rainfall. Several interior cities reported damage from the hurricane. Property damage was relatively minor in Angleton, where winds peaked at 65 mph (105 km/h). Minor structures, including awnings, barns, and outhouses, were damaged. The hurricane wrought extensive damage to Brazos County, with strong winds destroying the chimneys and windows of numerous homes; the ruined façades resulted in widespread flooding of homes. Small houses and thousands of trees were toppled, as well as a 112 ft (34 m)-high oil derrick. Awnings were pulled apart from storefronts throughout the Main Street area, and the county courthouse was badly damaged. Two halls and small buildings were damaged at Texas A&M University, amounting to a damage toll of $5,000–$10,000. The Bryan Weekly Eagle reported that the storm had "no equal in the history of the county". Widespread damage also occurred in Rockdale and Caldwell. At Rockdale, the winds caused leaks in almost every house and tore down power lines, while store awnings and a church steeple were blown away in Caldwell. Telegraph and train service were out in Rosenberg, where business signage, trees, and wires were blown down by strong winds; the city incurred a $3,000 damage toll. A church and warehouse in Elgin were destroyed. Seven other towns reported major cotton losses and minor property damage. Lockhart lost 75–80 percent of their cotton and many of their shade trees. The cotton crop was entirely destroyed in Bastrop, Hallettsvile, Sealy, Shiner, and Smithville. About 15–25 percent of cotton across Central Texas was damaged, amounting to several millions of dollars in losses. In Travis County, more cotton bolls were open compared to other areas prior to the storm, making the county susceptible to greater losses. All unharvested corn was blown down in Lexington. In Williamson County, the storm was more destructive than the 1900 hurricane, damaging outhouses, windmills, and buildings on the Southwestern University campus. The county also lost 15,000–20,000 bales of cotton. Heavy rains and winds of 44–48 mph (71–77 km/h) were reported across the Dallas–Fort Worth area.

Rainfall from the hurricane spread across East Texas, with the heaviest rains occurring near the state border with Louisiana and tapering farther west. The highest precipitation total was 19.83 in (504 mm) in San Augustine; however, rainfall totals were likely undermeasured as the rain gauges could not accurately measure rain blown horizontally by the winds. Eighteen weather stations set 24-hour rainfall records for the month of August. On August 18, 5.10 in (130 mm) of rain was measured in McKinney, setting a 24-hour rainfall record for Collin County; a total 7.23 in (184 mm) of rain throughout the storm. Significant flooding occurred along the Sabine and Neches rivers, with minor flooding along the ends of the Trinity River. Supplied by 10–19 in (250–480 mm) rainfall amounts throughout their watersheds, the Sabine and Neches rivers remained flooded for the remainder of August, expanding to a width of 4 mi (6.4 km) in some locations. The rivers reached their highest stages on August 23, with the Neches River at Beaumont reaching a stage of 14 ft (4.3 m); this was the highest river stage for Beaumont since river observations began in September 1903. The elevated Neches River inundated a 4.5 mi (7.2 km) wide section of Orange County.

==== Interior United States ====
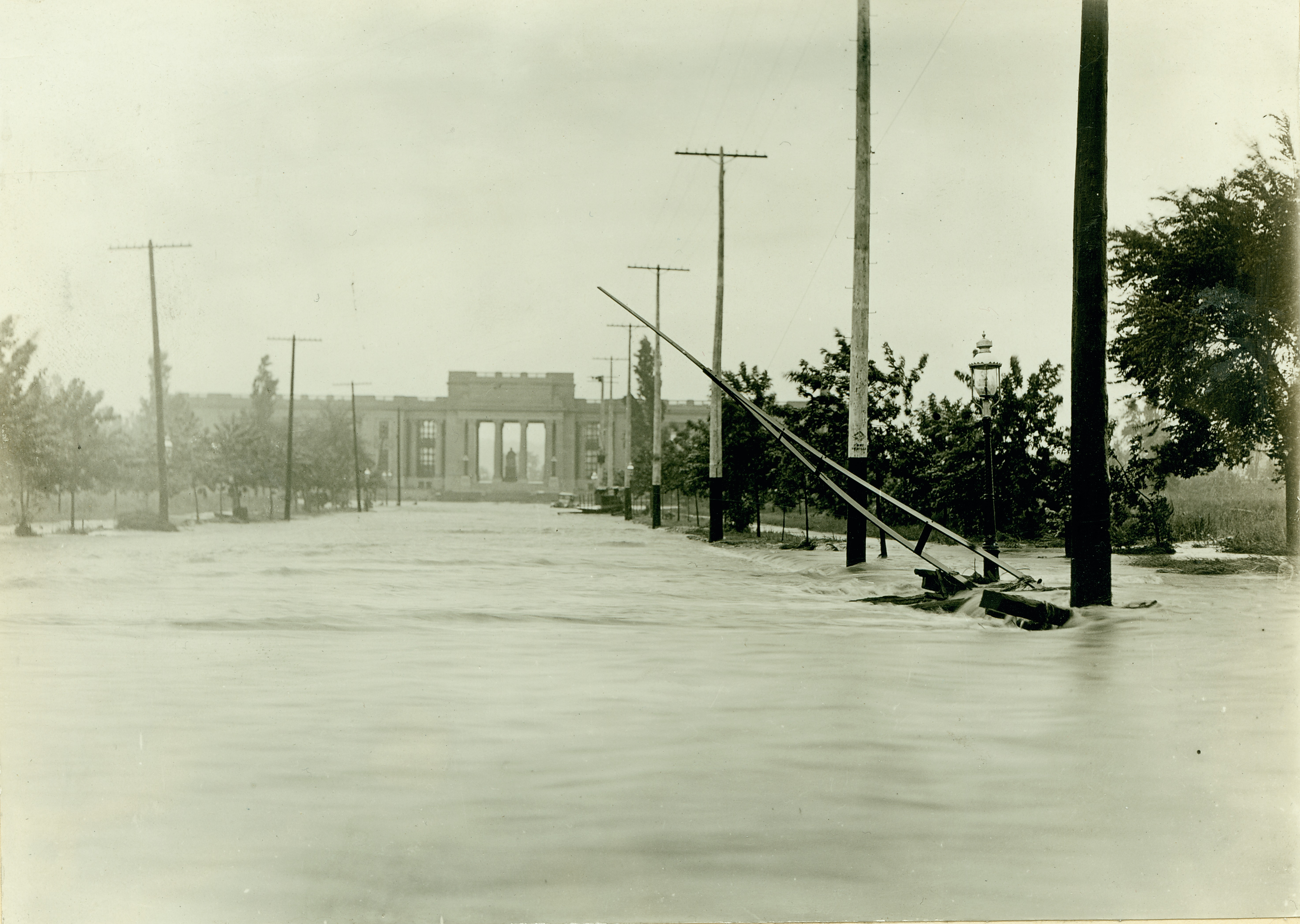
The hurricane's remnants caused the heaviest 24-hour rainfall in St. Louis history until 2022.

The remnants of the 1915 hurricane brought strong winds inland to the lower Ohio River Valley and severe flooding from Texas to New York. Heavy rains fell across much of Arkansas from August 17–21, flooding most rivers. Precipitation was heaviest within a narrow band extending from Mena to Hardy. Open cotton bolls and corn were beaten down by the precipitation. Many cities reported flooding after extended periods of continuous rainfall. The Ouachita River at Hot Springs reached its highest level on record, causing thousands of dollars in damage to crops. The White River experienced its worst flood overall since 1891, though upper portions of the river valley experienced unprecedented flooding. Entire towns were caught in the floodwaters, with bridges and buildings destroyed along the banks. All crops along the river upstream of DeValls Bluff were destroyed; these crops included corn and cotton at lowland farms, as well as stored hay. Corn and cotton suffered significant losses in Jamestown, McHue, Moorefield, Pfeiffer, and Sulphur Rock. In Independence County, 15,000 acres (6,100 hectares) of cropland were submerged by the White River. Newport was flooded after the local levee along the river was breached. The city's water and electricity plants went out of commission and all businesses were forced to close. The causeway across Newport Lake was washed out. Two steamers were later sent there to rescue flood-stricken residents. A family of five drowned at Oil Trough upstream. Many livestock also drowned from the rise of White River. Similar flooding occurred along the Strawberry River in Sharp County and the Black River in Lawrence County. The swollen Arkansas and Red rivers also caused damaging floods, albeit less severe than along the banks of the White River. Bridges and railroads were washed out by the Red and Saline rivers. Thirteen bridges along the Missouri and Northern Arkansas Railroad were damaged. Total losses from the storm in Arkansas amounted to $2.43 million.

Heavy rainfall from the weakening remnants also damaged crops and property between August 18–21 in eastern parts of the Ozark Plateau in Missouri. Saint Louis University in St. Louis recorded the highest precipitation total in the state at 8.20 in (208 mm) until 2022. St. Louis suffered catastrophic flooding from the remnants of the 1915 hurricane, recording the city's highest single-day rainfall total with 6.85 in (174 mm) on August 20. The rains were also accompanied by gusty winds topping out at 42 mph (68 km/h). The River Des Peres overflowed its banks, flooding 15 mi^{2} (39 km^{2}) and encompassing many streets including Delmar Boulevard. Train and streetcar service throughout the city was halted. The Wabash Railroad station on Delmar Boulevard was isolated by floodwaters 7 ft (2.1 m) deep and 200 yd (180 m) wide. The station's platforms were swept away into the current. The city's sewage and drainage infrastructure clogged, leaving standing water in low-lying streets and preventing residents from eliminating floodwaters from their homes. Congested sewers were responsible for much of the flooding in the West End. Forest Park was flooded, submerging the golf course and endangering the St. Louis Zoo. The subway at Union Station was inundated by 4 ft (1.2 m) of water from Mill Creek. Numerous motor and horse-drawn vehicles became stranded in water. Along Manchester Avenue, homes and mills were destroyed by the fast-moving currents. Hundreds of people were forced to evacuate their homes by boat. All boats in three city parks were seized by the St. Louis Parks Department for use in rescue efforts. In the Carondelet neighborhood, 115 residents were rescued. Five thousand people were rendered homeless; the St. Louis Coliseum was opened as a temporary housing arrangement for displaced residents. Twenty people were killed in the floods, including a family of five at a one-room cottage near Hampton Avenue and six others in the Ellendale neighborhood. A total of 1,025 homes were damaged or destroyed. The Meramec River rose 43 ft (13 m) from the flooding, submerging the entire town of Valley Park 20 mi (32 km) southwest of St. Louis. Buildings were flooded to their second floors. Damage from the flooding in St. Louis County extending into western Illinois was estimated at $1 million.

Further east, the hurricane’s renmants enhanced significant flooding in Ellenville, New York. While there were no fatalities, the storm led to heavy crop, railroad and road damage.

===== Ohio River Valley =====
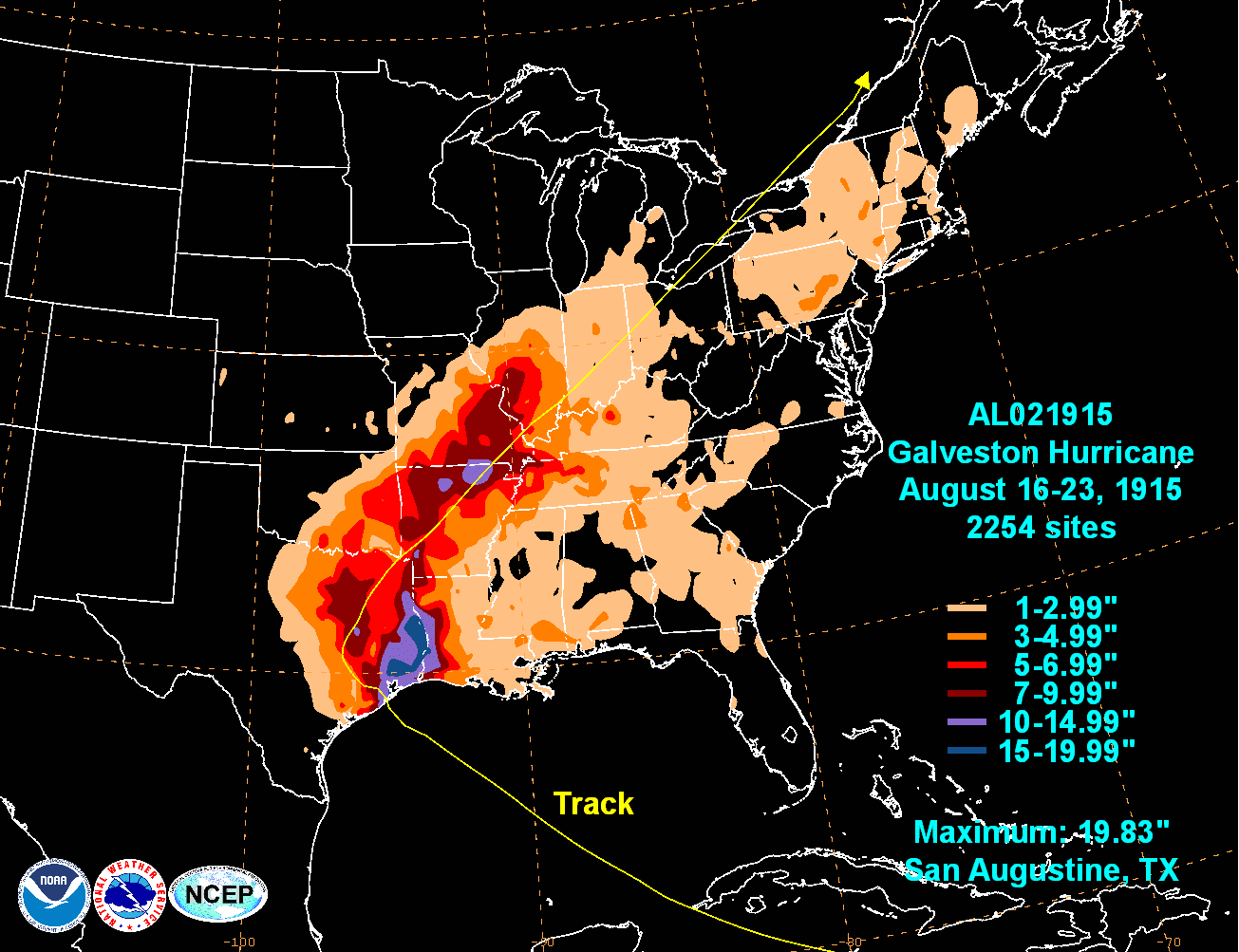
Map of the total precipitation from the hurricane across the United States

The hurricane's remnants contributed to the coolest and rainiest August in Illinois history. The storm tracked across the southern part of the state on August 20, bringing high winds and heavy rain. Rail service was delayed throughout central Illinois. The winds damaged corn throughout the southern half of the state, with the crop damage worsened by rivers overflowing their banks. Widespread precipitation totals of 3 in (76 mm) were recorded, with a localized area of 6–8 in (150–200 mm) totals within 70 mi (110 km) of St. Louis, Missouri. Flooding occurred in the state's southwestern counties southward to Jackson County. Many farm animals drowned and bridges and railroads were washed out. A levee breach resulted in the flooding of Benbow City, East Alton, and western Wood River. Many factories suspended operations due to floods, including cartridge and gunpowder producers who incurred $250,000 in damage. Two companies' factories were overtaken by flooding with their 400 employees narrowly escaping. The rains in East St. Louis overloaded the city's sewage system and drainage canal, flooding adjacent homes. Fifty houses were inundated in Belleville. Richland Creek, which runs through Belleville, had expanded from its normal 15 ft (4.6 m) width to a width of 900 ft (270 m) as a result of the rainfall.

Corn and tobacco crops were damaged in Christian and Trigg counties in Kentucky by the storm's winds. In Louisville, five-minute sustained winds peaked at 48 mph (77 km/h). Crops were also damaged at Lone Oak in McCracken County, including apple and peach trees. Telecommunications were disrupted in Paducah after telephone and telegraph wires were damaged by the storm's winds. Street lights in the city were also knocked out amid power interruptions. Winds of 42 mph (68 km/h) were measured in Nashville, Tennessee. One person was injured in Nashville by a plateglass window blown out by the wind, while another person in the city was injured after a wind-loosened sign fell upon them. The winds downed a few telecommunication lines across Tennessee.

== Aftermath ==
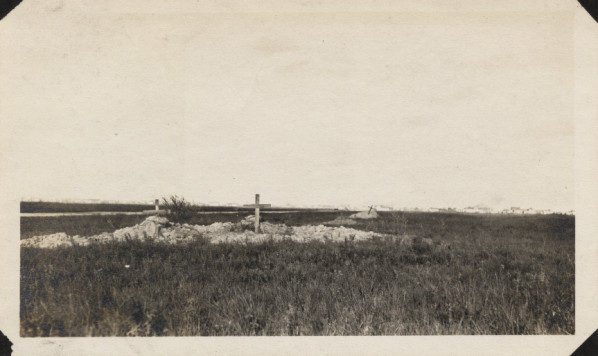
Graves of storm victims in Texas City after the hurricane

Following the hurricane's passage, the director of Jamaica's railways, Sydney Couper, established headquarters at Annotto Bay to oversee extensive railway repairs. The island's banana, coconut, and coffee exports for 1915 were reduced relative to 1914 as a result of the storm, contributing to a trade deficit of $480,782 for the year and a decrease of $3.3 million in total exports relative to 1914.

A meeting to discuss aftermath management was assembled on August 17 at Galveston's Cotton Exchange Building, with Mayor Fisher presiding and representatives of the city's interests present. Drinking water was made available on request via the pumping station on 33rd Street, which would be able to supply potable water for two weeks. The mayor also ordered the establishment of a milk depot. Fisher ordered all Galveston saloons closed and persons suspected of liquor possession searched. He asserted at the meeting that federal assistance was likely unnecessary, instead convening a relief committee composed of 50 members of the city's commercial association, maritime association, retail merchants' association, cotton exchange, and labor council, with the head of each group appointing 10 people to the committee. Members of the U.S. Fifth Brigade assisted with local residents in recovery efforts. Cleanup work quickly began on the Galveston Causeway and construction began on a temporary trestle bridge connecting Galveston and Virginia Point. Longer-term plans to restore the causeway were deliberated upon by engineers at a conference in Houston on August 31. By September, rail service with Galveston was reestablished. Fireboats pumped sewage and debris from the city out into Galveston Harbor. Seven salvage firms presented bids to refloat steamships grounded by the hurricane. The cities of San Antonio and Dallas each delivered approximately 10,000 loaves of bread to Houston for distribution in affected areas. Several infrastructure plans were forwarded to mitigate impacts from storms like the 1915 hurricane, including elevating the city further and extending the seawall; these proposals would necessitate millions of dollars.

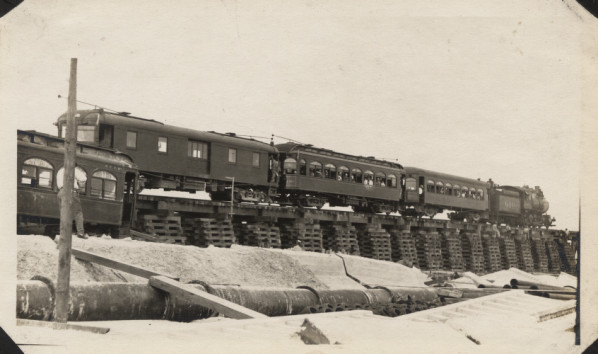
A temporary trestle was built to facilitate rail service into Galveston after the causeway was damaged.

Texas Governor James E. Ferguson directed the state to "render all assistance possible to Galveston, should the seriousness of the situation warrant such action"; he and members of his executive staff later traveled to the city to assess the situation. Ferguson later called for relief supplies and funds to be sent to Austin, primarily for communities outside Houston and Galveston. The Texas Adjutant General, John A. McCalmont, prepared blankets, cots, and tents for shipment to Houston and Galveston for storm refugees. Militia companies from Austin were sent to oversee the distribution of relief supplies. Houston Mayor Benjamin Campbell compelled several hundred city residents at a meeting on August 17 to determine the necessary aid needed for Galveston; at the time, there was a lack of information on the storm's impacts arising from Galveston. A steamer was later dispatched at Campbell's behest to investigate the hurricane's effects there. Campbell also barred people from traveling to Galveston without permits describing their intent and requesting admittance into the city; travelers were stopped in Texas City to verify permits. Due to the damage wrought to West End Park in Houston, the Houston Ball Club transferred their remaining games in the 1915 season in San Antonio. The Corpus Christi Caller organized a storm relief fund, and a similar fund was organized by Waco residents.

Fifty men with motor boats and skiffs were dispatched on a special Kansas City Southern Railway train to assist in rescue operations in Port Arthur. Following the storm, Texas City was placed under martial law, accompanied by 4,400 soldiers either stationed or taking refuge in the city. Major General J. Franklin Bell issued rations for soldiers and civilians. Bell also requested clothing for soldiers of the Second Division of the U.S. Army stationed there after their camp was destroyed; ultimately, U.S. Secretary of War Lindley Miller Garrison decided not to rebuild the camp, resulting in the division's relocation. In order to prevent the spread of disease, over a hundred animal carcasses were burned in Texas City.

== See also ==
- List of Texas hurricanes (1900–1949)
  - 1932 Freeport hurricane
  - 1909 Velasco hurricane
  - Hurricane Beryl – A destructive storm that affected the same areas
