= Christmas Bay (Texas) =

Estuary bay in Brazoria County, Texas

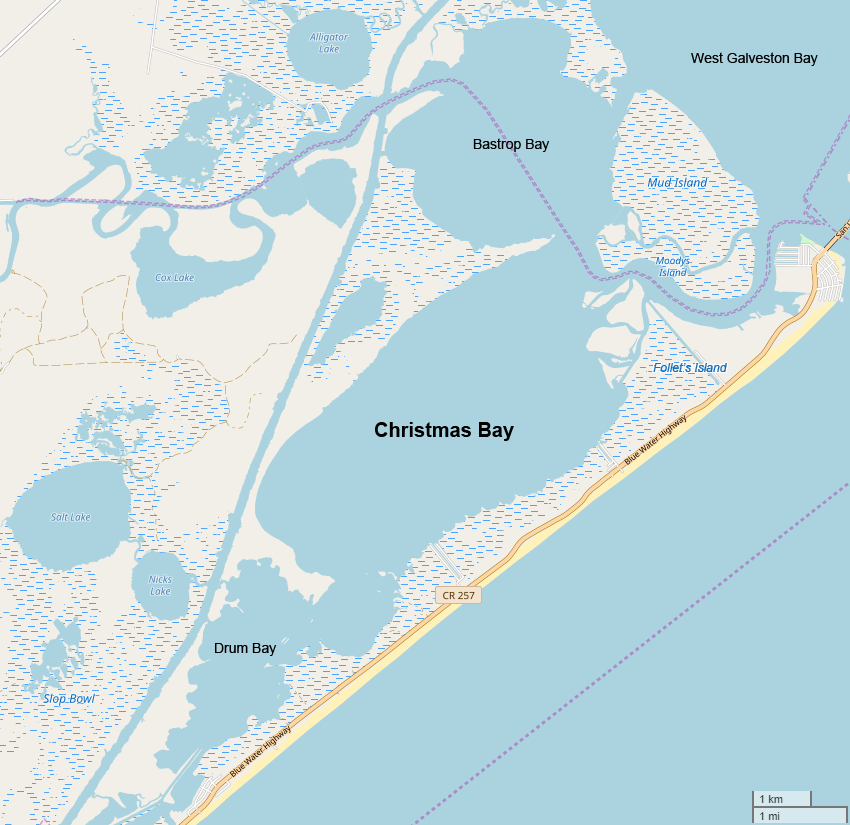

- Location within Texas Location within the United States
- Location: Texas Gulf Coast
- Coordinates: 29°3′N 95°11′W
- Primary inflows: Bastrop Bayou
- Ocean/sea sources: Gulf of Mexico
- Basin countries: United States
- Surface area: 4,173 acres (1,689 ha)

Christmas Bay is a shallow bay located on the Texas Gulf Coast in Brazoria County, Texas, southwest of West Bay near the Galveston Bay system. It is a minor estuary protected from the Gulf of Mexico by Follet's Island, with tidal exchange through San Luis Pass and Cold Pass. The bay connects to Bastrop Bay on the north and Drum Bay on the southwest. The nearest city is Freeport, approximately 10 miles (16 km) away at the mouth of the Brazos River.

Christmas Bay covers 4,173 acres (1,689 ha) and is recognized for its high water quality, extensive oyster reefs, and fringing salt marsh habitat dominated by Spartina alterniflora and Batis maritima. Much of its shoreline lies within the Brazoria National Wildlife Refuge, contributing to its ecological integrity. The bay is designated as a Texas Coastal Preserve and a State Scientific Area due to its ecological productivity and minimal anthropogenic disturbance.

== History ==
The modern configuration of Christmas Bay and the upper Texas coast formed during the Holocene following the last glacial period. Approximately 18,000 years ago, global sea levels were much lower, and the Trinity River carved a deep canyon through what is now the Houston Ship Channel. Rising seas during post-glacial warming inundated these valleys, creating the Galveston Bay complex and its associated estuaries, including Christmas Bay, between 7,000 and 5,000 years ago.

Local lore suggests the bay was named by German settlers who arrived near San Luis Pass around Christmas Day in 1838. The nearby town of San Luis briefly flourished as a port rivaling Galveston before hurricanes and the 1900 storm led to its abandonment.

== Geography and Hydrology ==
Christmas Bay is part of the Galveston Bay estuarine complex and receives freshwater inflow primarily from Bastrop Bayou and adjacent coastal watersheds. Salinity gradients fluctuate with seasonal rainfall and tidal exchange through San Luis Pass, creating diverse habitats for estuarine species.

== Ecology ==
The bay lies within the Western Gulf coastal grasslands ecoregion and supports extensive seagrass beds, primarily shoal grass (Halodule wrightii), with patches of turtle grass (Thalassia testudinum)—a species otherwise rare north of Aransas Bay. These habitats serve as critical nursery habitat for red drum, speckled trout, southern flounder, shrimp, and blue crab, supporting both recreational and commercial fishing industries.

The bay hosts large oyster reefs and cordgrass marshes that provide nesting grounds for waterbirds. Endangered species such as the piping plover and brown pelican occur here, alongside roseate spoonbill, great egret, white-faced ibis, and mottled duck. Common bottlenose dolphins frequent the bay’s channels.

== Recreation ==
Christmas Bay is popular for kayaking, birdwatching, and saltwater fishing. The Christmas Bay Paddling Trail, managed by Texas Parks and Wildlife Department, spans 19.1 miles (30.7 km) with shorter loops of 3.8 and 10.3 miles. Anglers target redfish, speckled trout, and flounder in its shallow waters.

== Conservation and Threats ==
Designated as a State Coastal Preserve, Christmas Bay faces threats from shoreline erosion, invasive species, and potential impacts of climate change such as sea-level rise and salinity shifts. Restoration efforts include Spartina alterniflora planting and seagrass monitoring to maintain habitat quality.

== Climate ==
The bay's climate is classed as humid subtropical. Prevailing south and southeast breezes bring heat from Mexico's deserts and precipitation from the Gulf of Mexico. Summer temperatures routinely surpass 90 °F (32 °C), and the humidity in the area raises the heat index even further. Winters in the region are warm, with average winter highs of 60 °F (16 °C) and lows of 40 °F (4 °C). Annual rainfall is considerably over 40 inches (100 cm) on average, with the area reaching well over 50 inches (130 cm) sometimes. During the fall season, hurricanes are a constant concern.

== See also ==
- Galveston Bay
- Brazoria National Wildlife Refuge
- San Luis Pass (Galveston Island)
