= San Luis Pass =

San Luis Pass may refer to:

- San Luis Pass (Colorado), a mountain pass on the Continental Divide of the Americas in the San Juan Mountains of Colorado, United States.
- San Luis Pass (New Mexico), a mountain pass on the Continental Divide of the Americas in the Animas Mountains of New Mexico, United States.
- San Luis Pass (Galveston Island), a strait between Galveston Island and Treasure Island, Texas, United States.
