= Bastrop Bayou =

Location
- Country: United States

Physical characteristics
- Source
  - location: Texas
- Mouth
  - location: 29°06′12.9″N 95°11′31.4″W
- Length: 25 mi (40 km)
- Basin size: 120 sq mi (310 km^{2})

Bastrop Bayou is a coastal stream in Brazoria County, Texas, flowing southeast for approximately 25 miles (40 km) from its headwaters near Angleton to its mouth at Bastrop Bay, which connects to the Gulf of Mexico via Christmas Bay and San Luis Pass. The bayou drains a watershed of about 120 square miles (310 km^{2}), supporting diverse ecosystems and serving as a key hydrological feature of the Galveston Bay estuarine complex.

== Geography ==
Bastrop Bayou originates near the western edge of Angleton, Texas, flowing through low-lying coastal prairie and salt marsh habitats before emptying into Bastrop Bay. The bayou's course is characterized by meandering channels, oxbow lakes, and riparian wetlands.

== History ==
Historically, Bastrop Bayou served as a transportation corridor for early settlers and was integral to the development of agriculture in Brazoria County. During the 19th century, the bayou supported rice farming and cattle ranching, and its proximity to the Gulf of Mexico facilitated trade.

== Ecology ==
The bayou and its adjacent marshes provide critical nursery habitat for estuarine species such as red drum, speckled trout, southern flounder, and blue crab. Vegetation includes cordgrass (Spartina alterniflora), saltwort (Batis maritima), and submerged seagrass beds. The watershed supports migratory birds including roseate spoonbill, brown pelican, and piping plover.

== Recreation ==
Bastrop Bayou is popular for kayaking, birdwatching, and saltwater fishing. The Texas Parks and Wildlife Department maintains the Bastrop Bayou Paddling Trail, offering scenic routes through marshes and tidal flats.

== Conservation ==
The watershed faces challenges from elevated bacteria levels, stormwater runoff, and habitat loss. The Houston-Galveston Area Council and Texas Commission on Environmental Quality have implemented watershed protection plans to improve water quality and restore riparian buffers.

== See also ==
- List of rivers of Texas
- Christmas Bay (Texas)
- Galveston Bay
- Brazoria National Wildlife Refuge
