= Bastrop Bay =

Bay in Brazoria County, Texas

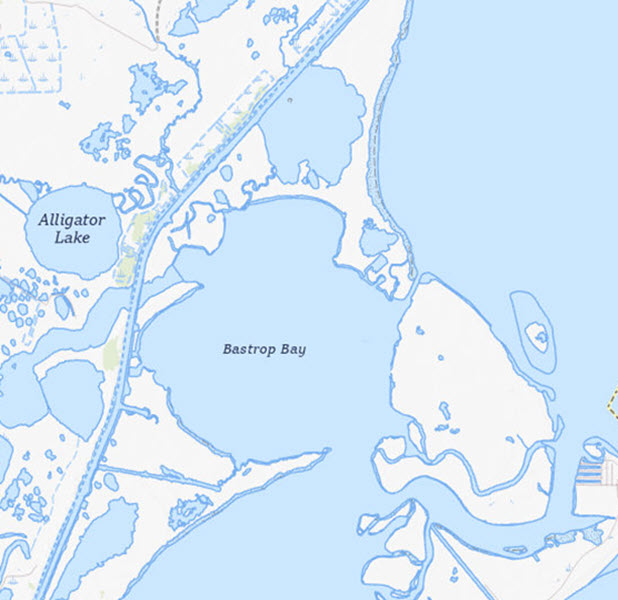

- Location within Texas Location within the United States
- Location: Texas Gulf Coast
- Coordinates: 29°05′N 95°10′W
- Primary inflows: Bastrop Bayou
- Ocean/sea sources: Gulf of Mexico
- Basin countries: United States
- Surface area: 2,000 acres (810 ha)
- Max. depth: 5 feet (1.5 m)

Bastrop Bay is a shallow bay located in Brazoria County, Texas, on the Texas Gulf Coast. It lies immediately north of Christmas Bay and southwest of West Bay, forming part of the Galveston Bay estuarine system. The bay is connected to Christmas Bay and the Gulf of Mexico through San Luis Pass and Cold Pass. Its primary freshwater inflow is Bastrop Bayou, which drains a large portion of Brazoria County.

== Geography and hydrology ==
Bastrop Bay occupies low-lying coastal terrain characterized by salt marshes and tidal flats. The bay averages less than 5 feet (1.5 m) in depth and is influenced by tidal exchange with the Gulf of Mexico. Freshwater inflow comes primarily from Bastrop Bayou and its tributaries, including Austin Bayou. Seasonal rainfall and tidal action create variable salinity gradients, supporting diverse estuarine habitats.

== History ==
The bay and its namesake bayou were historically significant as transportation routes for early settlers in Brazoria County. In the 19th century, shallow-draft steamboats and sailboats used Bastrop Bayou to move goods between inland communities and the Gulf Coast. The surrounding region developed as part of Stephen F. Austin’s colony and later became a center for rice farming and cattle ranching.

== Ecology ==
Bastrop Bay and its adjacent marshes provide critical nursery habitat for estuarine species. Vegetation includes cordgrass , saltwort, and submerged seagrass beds dominated by shoal grass. Common fish species include red drum, speckled trout, southern flounder, and black drum, supporting both recreational and commercial fishing. Large oyster reefs occur near the bay’s mouth, and the marshes host waterbirds such as roseate spoonbill, great egret, white-faced ibis, and mottled duck. Endangered species like the piping plover and brown pelican are occasionally observed.

== Recreation ==
Bastrop Bay is popular for kayaking, birdwatching, and saltwater fishing. Anglers target redfish, speckled trout, and flounder in its shallow waters. Public access is limited, but nearby launches on Bastrop Bayou provide entry points for paddlers.

== Conservation and environmental issues ==
The Bastrop Bay watershed faces challenges from elevated bacteria levels linked to failing septic systems, agricultural runoff, and reduced freshwater inflows. The Texas Commission on Environmental Quality has identified segments of Bastrop Bayou as impaired for contact recreation due to high bacteria counts. Conservation efforts include riparian buffer restoration, septic system upgrades, and outreach programs to reduce nonpoint source pollution.

== See also ==
- Brazoria National Wildlife Refuge
- Texas Coastal Preserve Program
