= West Bay (Texas) =

Bay in Texas, United States

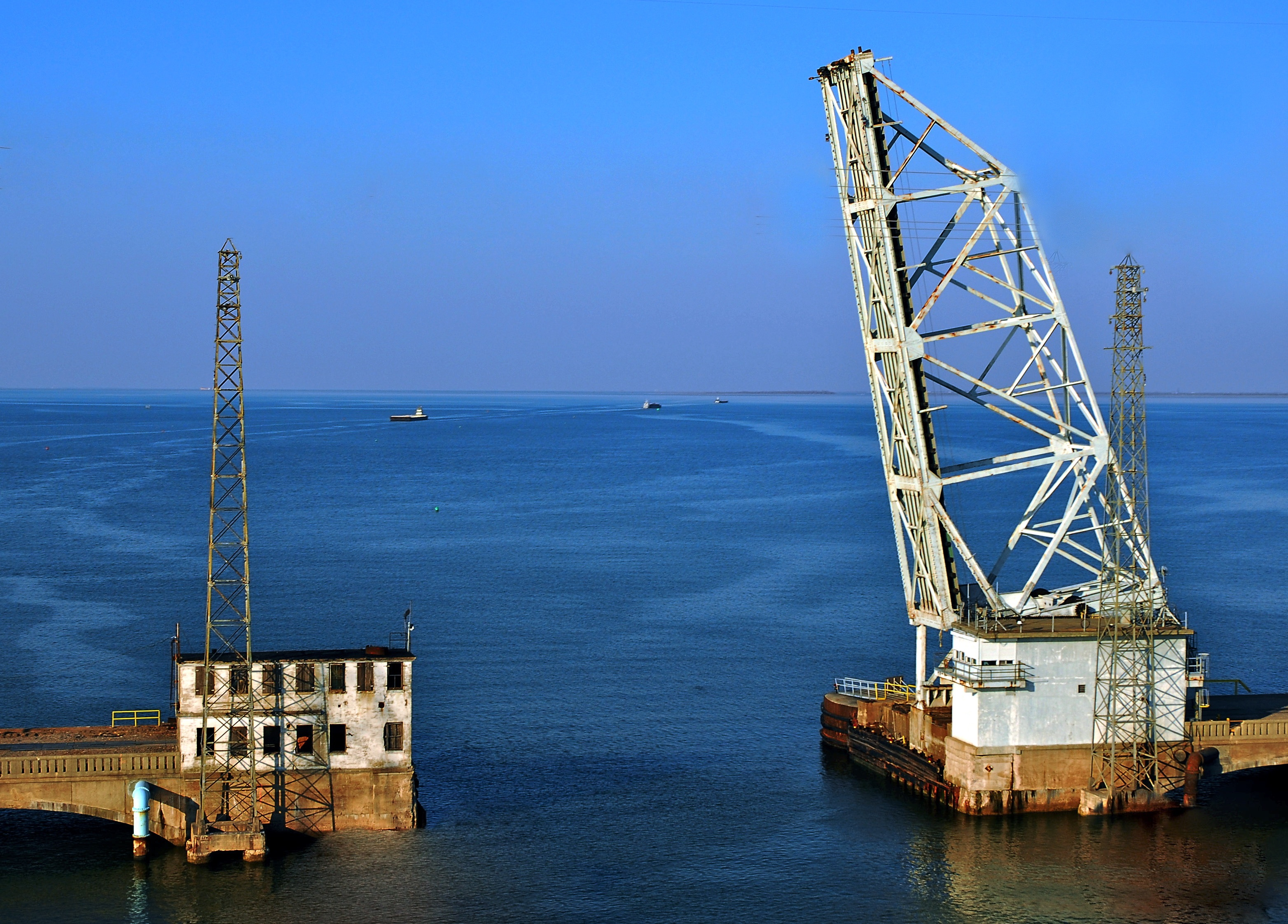
- The old Galveston Causeway, crossing West Bay

- Location within Texas Location within the United States
- Location: Texas Gulf Coast
- Coordinates: 29.257049°N 94.96582°W
- Ocean/sea sources: Gulf of Mexico
- Basin countries: United States
- Settlements: Jamaica Beach, Tiki Island

West Bay, also referred to as West Galveston Bay, is a long inlet of Galveston Bay in Galveston and Brazoria counties that nearly runs the entire length west of Galveston Island.

== History ==
West Bay, as it is known today, began its formation about 5,500 years ago when Galveston Island was shaped following the rise in the sea level. At the time, West Bay was situated just north of the mouth of the Brazos River, which formed a delta at what is now San Luis Pass. Three thousand years later, the river diverted south to its present location at Surfside Beach. The bay's current formation was complete by about 1,200 years ago.

The main settlements on the bay include Tiki Island located at the mainland base of the Galveston Causeway, and Jamaica Beach on Galveston Island, just south of Galveston Island State Park. Jamaica Beach, a resort with a population of about 1,075 was found in 1957 on the site of a former Karankawa Indian burial ground. Across the bay from Jamaica Beach is Tiki Island, an affluent village of 1,016 people, that was established in the 1960s and incorporated in 1982.

== Features ==
West Bay is bounded by San Luis Pass to its south, and Galveston Causeway to the north, where it meets with Galveston Bay. It is adjacent to Christmas Bay, which extends south into Brazoria National Wildlife Refuge. Its extensions include Chocolate Bay to the west, Jones Bay to the north, and Bastrop Bay to the south. Overall, the bay covers roughly 39 square miles (100 km^{2}).
