= Galveston Island =

Barrier island off Galveston Bay, Texas

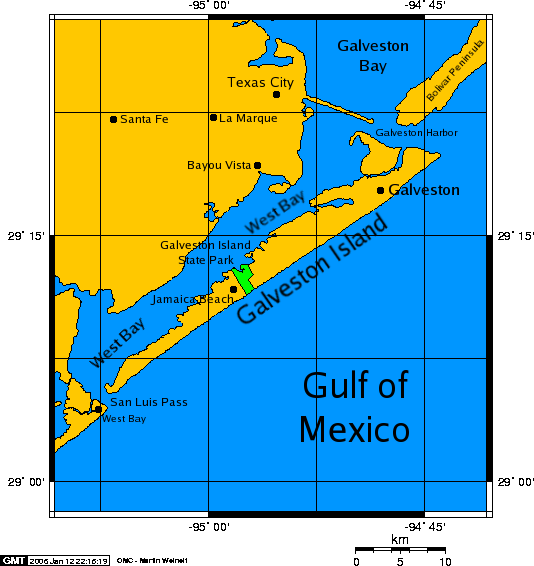
- A map of Galveston Island, a barrier island on the Texas Gulf coast in the United States

- Location within Texas

Geography
- Location: Gulf of Mexico
- Coordinates: 29°13′20″N 94°54′32″W
- Archipelago: Texas barrier islands
- Area: 66 sq mi (170 km^{2})
- Length: 27 mi (43 km)
- Width: 3 mi (5 km)
- Highest point: 20 feet (6.1 m)

Administration
- United States
- State: Texas
- County: Galveston County
- Largest settlement: Galveston (pop. 47,743)

Demographics
- Population: 48,726 (2010)
- Pop. density: 342.21/km^{2} (886.32/sq mi)

Galveston Island (/ˈɡælvɪstən/ GAL-vis-tən) is a barrier island on the Texas Gulf Coast in the United States, about 50 miles (80.5 km) southeast of Houston. The entire island, with the exception of Jamaica Beach, is within the city limits of the City of Galveston in Galveston County.

The island is about 27 miles (43.5 km) long and no more than 3 miles (4.8 km) wide at its widest point. The island is oriented generally northeast-southwest, with the Gulf of Mexico on the east and south, West Bay on the west, and Galveston Bay on the north. The island's main access point from the mainland is Interstate Highway 45 which crosses the Galveston Causeway that crosses West Bay on the northeast side of the island.

The far north end of the island is separated from the Bolivar Peninsula by Galveston Harbor, the entrance to Galveston Bay and the Houston Ship Channel. Ferry service is available between Galveston Island and the Bolivar Peninsula. The southern end of the island is separated from the mainland by San Luis Pass. The San Luis Pass-Vacek Toll Bridge (tolls no longer collected since May 2025) connects the San Luis Pass Road on Galveston Island with the Bluewater Highway that leads south into the town of Surfside Beach.

The residents of the island (the non-tourists) classify themselves in two ways: born on the island (BOI) and islander by choice (IBC). “BOI” is cited in print from at least 1956 and “IBC” is cited in print from 1975.

== Education ==
All residents are zoned to Ball High School.

Colleges and universities include:

- Galveston College (GC)
- Texas A&M University at Galveston (TAMUG)
- University of Texas Medical Branch (UTMB)

== History ==
At the time of European encounter, Akokisa and Karankawa indigenous Americans lived and camped on what became known as Galveston Island. Earlier cultures likely used it as well for seasonal fishing and hunting.

Historians believe the island is where Álvar Núñez Cabeza de Vaca and his small party of around 80, made a brief stopover in November 1528, during his lengthy and notable survival odyssey. After returning to Spain in 1537, Cabeza de Vaca wrote an account of his eight years of traveling across what is now the US Southwest, first published in 1542 as La relación y comentarios ("The Account and Commentaries"), and in later editions retitled Naufragios y comentarios ("Shipwrecks and Commentaries").

Jao de la Porta, along with his brother Morin, financed the first settlement by ethnic Europeans on Galveston Island in 1816. Jao de la Porta was born in Portugal of Jewish parentage; he became a trader in Texas. (De la Porta was named supercargo for the Karankawa Indian trade and later became a full-time trader.)

The privateer Jean Lafitte brought his men and followers from Louisiana to the island, naming his settlement Campeche, after the older settlement on the Yucatan Peninsula. For a few years, the island and the bay were their base for piracy and smuggling in slaves after the United States had ended its international slave trade in 1808. After attacking an American ship, Lafitte was forced in 1821 to leave by the US Navy.

With the advent of Mexican independence in 1821, and the Texas Revolution soon after in 1836, the Anglo-American population in the Republic of Texas began to grow rapidly. The island quickly became Texas' primary port and a destination for immigration. Following Texas' annexation by the United States in 1845, the island's population soon surpassed the population of San Antonio. It became the state's major population center, a title it would hold until nearly the end of the 19th century. Galveston for a time before the American Civil War was the largest cotton shipping port in the world and the second-largest port for immigration in the United States. In the mid-19th century, it was a major port of entry for the many Germans who entered the state.

During the Civil War, the Union army seized control of the island from the South for a few months during early 1863. Confederate forces commanded by John B. Magruder expelled them from the island, and the Confederates controlled it for the remainder of the war.

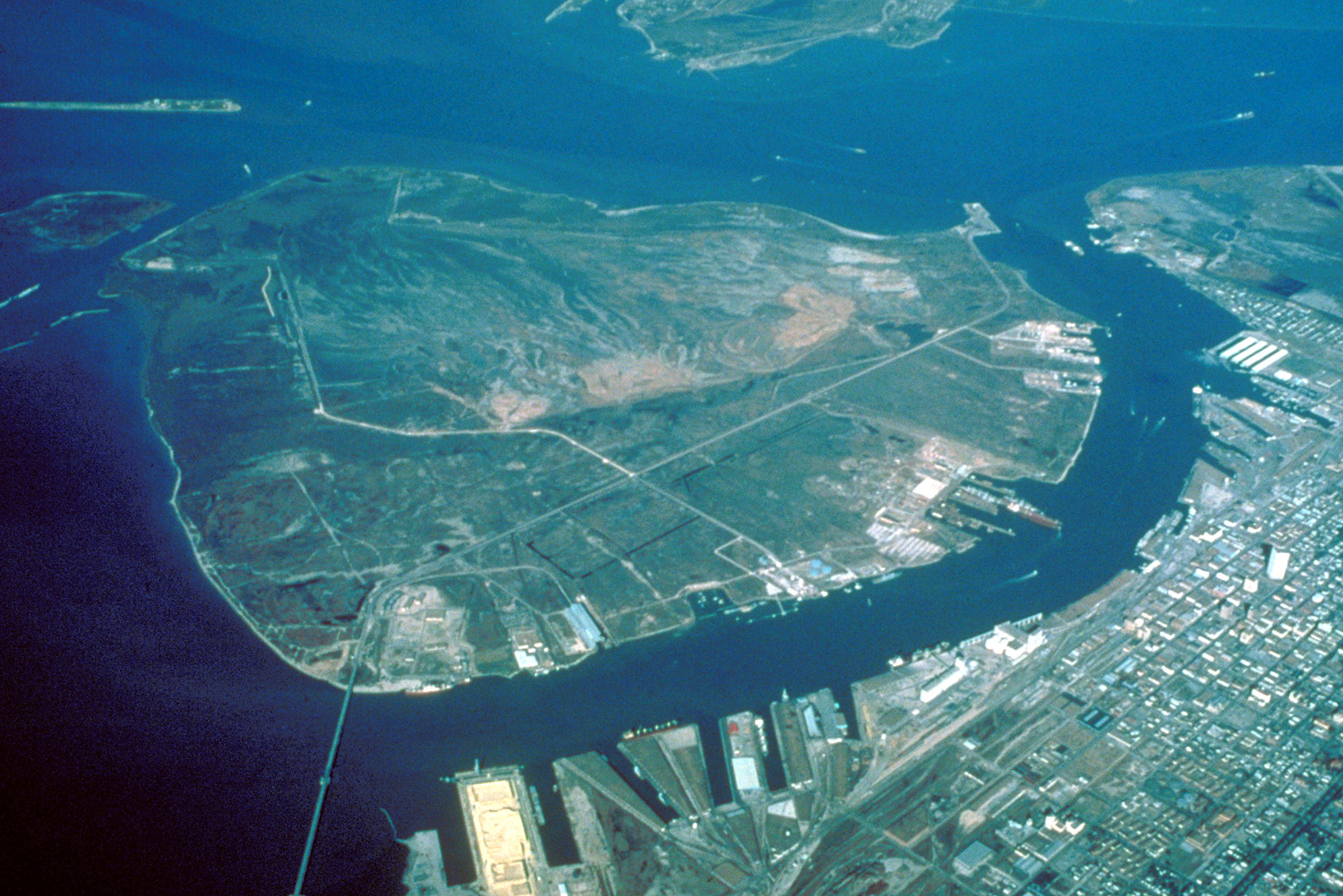
Aerial view of Pelican Island and the northeastern end of Galveston Island

On September 8, 1900, the most deadly natural distaster to ever strike the United States occurred at Galveston. In the early evening hours of September 8, the Galveston hurricane of 1900 came ashore, bringing with it a great storm surge that inundated most of Galveston Island and the city of Galveston. As a result, much of the city was destroyed, and at least 6,000 people were killed in a few hours.

Isaac M. Cline, the meteorologist in charge of the local Weather Bureau, lived on Galveston Island. Cline was aware of a storm in the Gulf based on previous reports from Florida. Although weather conditions were relatively calm on September 7, Cline observed the rough seas and the high waves that seemed to become more ominous by the hour. He sent a telegram to Washington, D.C., saying he thought a large part of the city was going to be underwater. He predicted a very heavy loss of life.

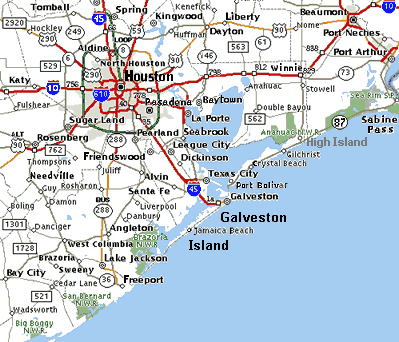
Houston-Galveston area of Texas, showing Galveston Island, parallel to coast

After the hurricane passed, the state and city constructed a seawall around the settled portion of the island. Some houses were razed, and the many new ones to be constructed were built on stilts. Sand dredged from nearby waterways was pumped into the area within the seawall. In time, the elevation of the eastern portion of the island was raised by as much as 17 ft (5.2 m).

== See also ==
- Henry Cohen Community House
- History of the Jews in Galveston, Texas
- Battle of Galveston

== Further information ==
- Galveston Island from the Handbook of Texas Online
- Galveston Island State Park official web site.
- Cabeza de Vaca, Álvar Núñez (1542). The Shipwrecked Men. Penguin. ISBN 978-0-14-103204-7.
