= Nursery habitat =

Marine environment

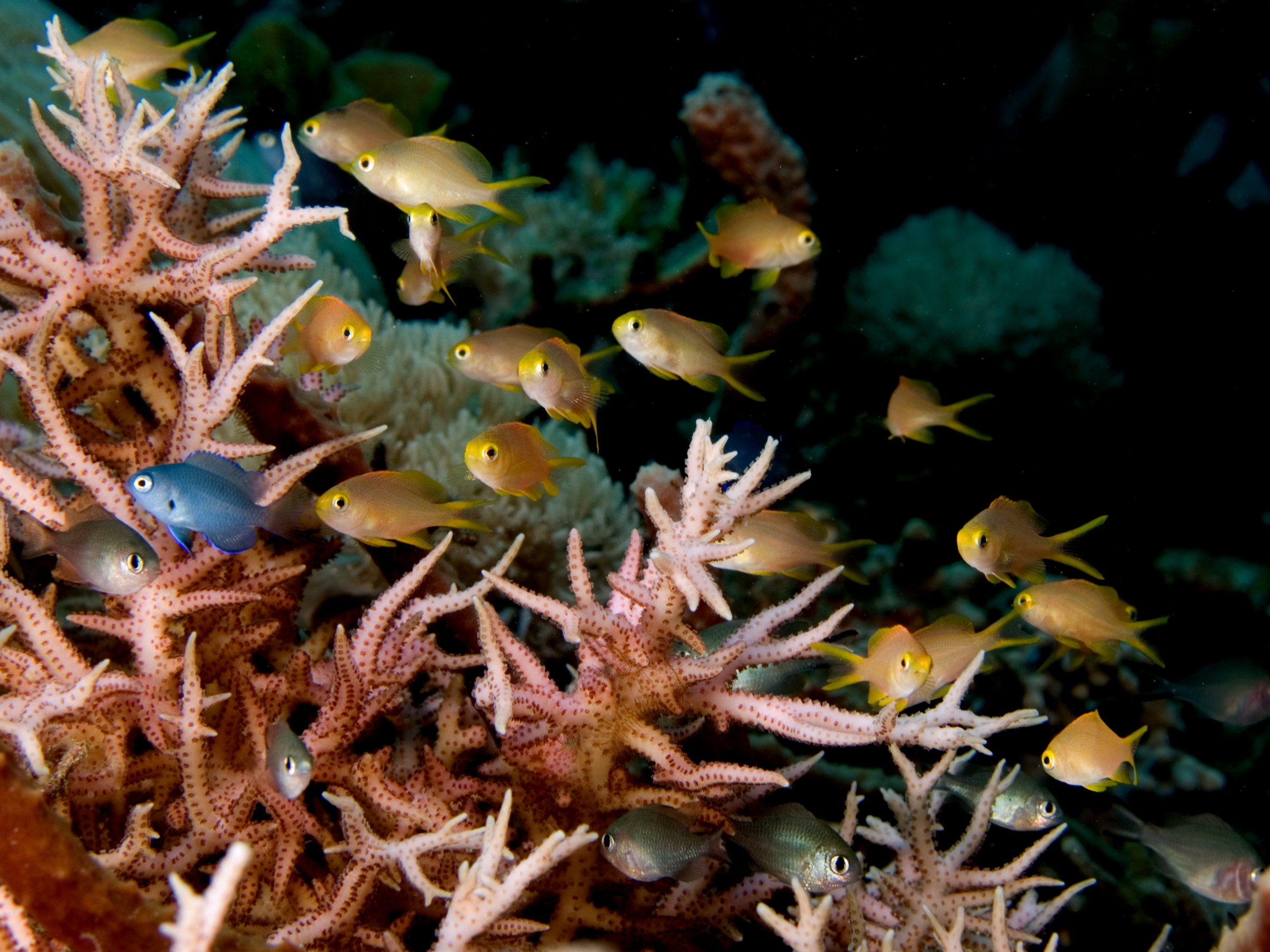
Juvenile Pseudanthias and Chromis in Seriatopora hystrix (Hard coral).

In marine environments, a nursery habitat is a subset of all habitats where juveniles of a species occur, having a greater level of productivity per unit area than other juvenile habitats. Mangroves, salt marshes and seagrass are typical nursery habitats for a range of marine species. Some species will use nonvegetated sites, such as the yellow-eyed mullet, blue sprat and flounder.

== Overview ==
The nursery habitat hypothesis states that the contribution per unit area of a nursery habitat is greater than for other habitats used by juveniles for the species. Productivity may be measured by density, survival, growth and movement to adult habitat.

There are two general models for the location of juvenile habitats within the total range for a species which reflect life history strategies of the species. These are the Classic Concept: Juveniles and Adults in separate habitats. Juveniles migrate to adult habitat. General Concept: overlap of juvenile and adult habitats.

Some marine species do not have juvenile habitats, e.g. arthropods and scallops. Fish, eels, some lobsters, blue crabs (and so forth) do have distinct juvenile habitats, whether with or without overlap with adult habitats.

In terms of management, use of the nursery role hypothesis may be limiting as it excludes some potentially important nursery sites. In these cases the Effective Juvenile Habitat concept may be more useful. This defines a nursery as that which supplies a higher percentage of individuals to adult populations.

Identification and subsequent management of nursery habitats may be important in supporting off-shore fisheries and ensuring species survival into the future. If we are unable to preserve nursery habitats, recruitment of juveniles into adult populations may decline, reducing population numbers and compromising the survival of species for biodiversity and human harvesting.

== Determination ==
In order to determine the nursery habitat for a species, all habitats used by juveniles must be surveyed. This may include kelp forest, seagrass, mangroves, tidal flat, mudflat, wetland, salt marsh and oyster reef. While density may be an indicator of productivity, it is suggested that alone, density does not adequately provide evidence of the role of a habitat as a nursery. Recruitment biomass from juvenile to adult population is the best measure of movement between the two habitats.

Consider also biotic, abiotic and landscape variability in the value of nursery habitats. This may be an important consideration when looking at which sites to manage and protect. Biotic factors include: structural complexity, food availability, larval settlement cues, competition, and predation. Abiotic: temperature, salinity, depth, dissolved oxygen, freshwater inflow, retention zone and disturbance. Landscape factors involve: proximity of juvenile and adult habitats, access to larvae, number of adjacent habitats, patch shape, area and fragmentation. The effects of these factors may be positive or negative depending on species and broader environmental conditions at any given time.

It may be more holistic to consider temporal variation in habitats used as nurseries, and incorporating temporal scales into any testing is important. Also consider assemblages of species. Single species approaches may not be able to be used to adequately manage systems appropriately.

Acosta and Butler conducted experimental observation of spiny lobster to determine which habitats are used as nurseries. Mangroves are used as preferred nursery habitat when coral density is low. Predation on newly settled larvae was lower in mangrove than in seagrass beds and coral crevices. In comparison, Pipefish prefer seagrass over algae and sand habitats. King George Whiting have a more complex pattern of development. Settlement is preferred in seagrass and algae. Growth stages are primarily preferred in reef algae. 4 months post settlement, they move into unvegetated habitats (Jenkins and Wheatley, 1998).

=== Elusive Juvenile Habitats ===
For many fish species, including commercially exploited species that require careful management, juvenile habitats are unknown. In these cases, identifying nursery habitats requires knowledge of the spawning behavior and larval development of the species, and knowledge of the oceanography of the local marine environment (water currents; temperature, salinity, and density gradients; etc.). In combination, these sources of information can be used to predict where eggs go after spawning, where larvae hatch, and where larvae settle and metamorphose into juveniles. Further study of these settlement locations can identify the nursery habitats that should be considered in the management and conservation of the species.

For example, pelagic broadcast spawning, one of several spawning strategies known for marine species, occurs when eggs are released into some level of the water column and left to drift among the plankton until the larvae hatch and grow large enough to settle in nursery habitats and become juveniles after metamorphosis. To identify nursery habitats of pelagic broadcast spawning species, such as halibut, cod, grouper, and others, the first step is to identify the adult spawning grounds. This can be done with targeted fishing surveys and dissection of fish gonads for maturity stage. The location of the fish with mature (i.e. ready-to-spawn) gonads can be inferred as a spawning location.

Pelagic eggs are buoyant or semi-buoyant and will be subject to the currents and gradients at the level of the water column in which they were released. Plankton surveys at different depths above the spawning grounds of a species can be used to parcel out where in the water column the eggs have been released. Data on the water currents and environmental gradients at the same depths as the pelagic eggs can be incorporated into circulation models and used to calculate likely dispersal patterns for the eggs and subsequent larvae.

Information on the duration of larval development (i.e. the number of days it takes for an individual to develop into each larval life stage) can indicate how long the species remains in the water column and the distance the species may travel once it has reached a motile life stage instead of passively drifting. The knowledge of such larval movement capability can inform the likelihood that areas represent nursery habitats.

Other relevant information for identifying elusive nursery grounds is the presence or absence of appropriate prey for settling larvae and young juveniles, the presence or absence of predators, and the preferred environmental thresholds (temperature, salinity, etc.). Habitats that do not contain the properties necessary to support a juvenile of the given species are not likely to be nursery habitats, even if models of egg and larval dispersal indicate the possibility of settlement in those areas.

== Bibliography ==
- Bradbury, I.R., Snelgrove, P.V.R., 2001. Contrasting larval transport in demersal fish and benthic invertebrates: The roles of behaviour and advective processes in determining spatial pattern. Canadian Journal of Fisheries and Aquatic Sciences 58, 811–823.
- Hoagstrom, C.W., Turner, T.F., 2015. Recruitment ecology of pelagic-broadcast spawning minnows: Paradigms from the ocean advance science and conservation of an imperilled freshwater fauna. Fish and Fisheries 16, 282–299.
- Pepin, P., Helbig, J.A., 1997. Distribution and drift of Atlantic cod (Gadus morhua) eggs and larvae on the northeast Newfoundland Shelf. Canadian Journal of Fisheries and Aquatic Sciences 54, 670–685.
- A. Schwarz; M. Morrison; I. Hawes; J.Halliday (2006) Physical and biological characteristics of a rare marine habitat: sub-tidal seagrass beds of offshore islands. Science for Conservation 269. p. 39. Department of Conservation, New Zealand.
