= San Luis Pass (Galveston Island) =

Natural water inlet in Texas, United States

- Inlet
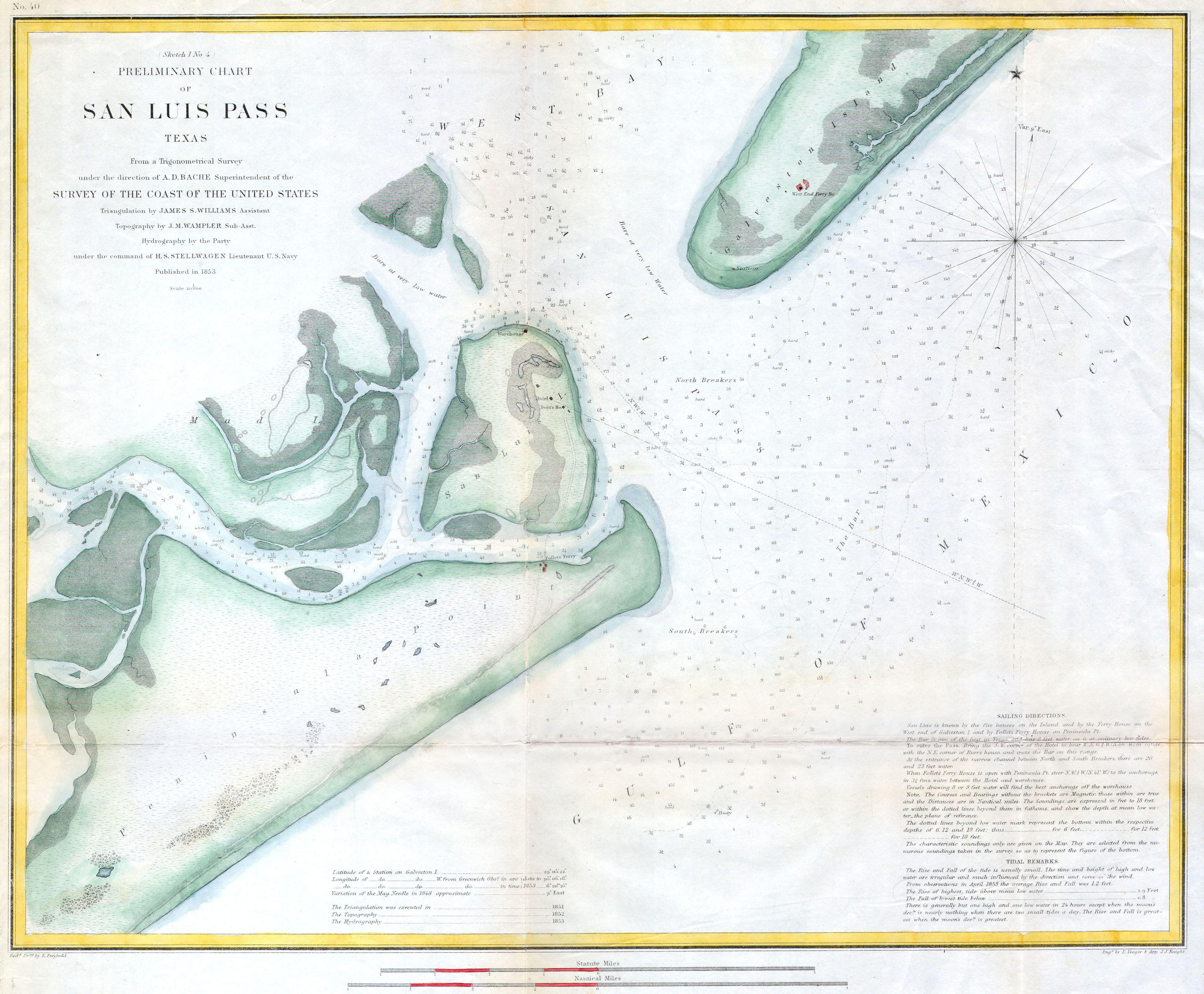
- San Luis Pass Coast Chart, ca. 1853

- Location within Texas Location within the United States
- Coordinates: 29.0824652°N 95.1215959°W
- Location: Follet's Island; Brazoria County; Galveston Island; Galveston County; Texas; United States
- Part of: West Bay
- Water bodies: Gulf of Mexico

Dimensions
  - Length: 2.25 mi (3.62 km)
  - Width: .75 mi (1.21 km)
  - Depth: 10 ft (3.0 m) ~ 40 ft (12 m)
  - Drop: 40 ft (12 m)
- Topo map: AOL. "San Luis Pass, TX" (Map). MapQuest. AOL.
- GNIS feature ID: 1367526; 1367525
- Road Navigation: Farm to Market Road 3005

San Luis Pass is a passage of water on the Texas Gulf Coast of the United States. It connects the sheltered waters of West Bay to the open Gulf of Mexico between Galveston Island and San Luis Island.

Fishermen and swimmers have been killed in the Pass' treacherous waters. The Gulf of Mexico-West Bay pass transitions vast volumes of seawater. The San Luis Pass physical oceanography is essentially contributed to the aggressive Gulf Stream and loop current, fluctuating tides in marginal sea, and marine sediment. The marginal sea's ocean circulation is periodically redefining the coastal continental shelf subsequently reciprocating uncertainties of continental margin at Follet's Island and West Galveston Island.

The San Luis Pass-Vacek Toll Bridge spans San Luis Pass from Galveston County to Brazoria County.

== Characteristics ==
Tide levels can vary by almost 2 feet (60 cm) in height, although the tidal effects seem more pronounced along straits than other barrier island zones. Water current dangers are prominent up to about one mile away from the pass along either island. A high amount of drownings occur in the vicinity of the San Luis Pass compared to other areas off of nearby beaches. Until June 2013, about 10 people drowned near San Luis pass on the Galveston side since 2001, and of those about 6 drowned there since 2007. The depth of the pass varies in depths to 40 feet deep.

Tides cause daily variations in topography, and occasionally, storms more drastically change the topography of the pass.

== Fishing and recreation ==
As of August 2017, swimming and fishing are now illegal at San Luis Beach due to the high number of drownings.

Pier fishing on the San Luis Pass Pier was a favorite for visitors and locals alike for many years, however the beach and pier were wiped out during Hurricane Ike in 2008, and it was not rebuilt. The pass is also home to bank fishermen who often travel many miles to take advantage of the excellent redfish population from June thru October.

Overnight camping, while once allowed, is prohibited on the Galveston side of the pass. The San Luis Pass Camp Ground and county park, on the Brazoria County side, is the only accessible place now. At least from the Galveston Island side, entering the water is prohibited, because of safety hazards.

Hurricane Ike in September 2008, forever changed the topography of the beach. What was once a driveway and public beach access is now part of the Gulf of Mexico. The land where the bait house of the pier once stood is now permanently submerged.

San Luis Pass on the Galveston side is a place for bird watching.

== San Luis Pass-Vacek Bridge ==
The "San Luis Pass-Vacek Bridge" or San Luis Pass Bridge was built shortly before 1970. It is operated by Galveston County, Road District 1. This 1.3 miles (2.1 km) bridge has two lanes and previously had a toll fee of $2. Surfside Beach is the closest city on the other side of Galveston along Brazoria County Road 257. The east approach to the San Luis Pass Bridge also serves as the western terminus of FM 3005. The bridge was the only toll facility in the Houston Metro that collected cash and did not utilize electronic toll collection. In May 2025, following a vote of the Galveston County Commissioners, toll collection ended on the bridge.

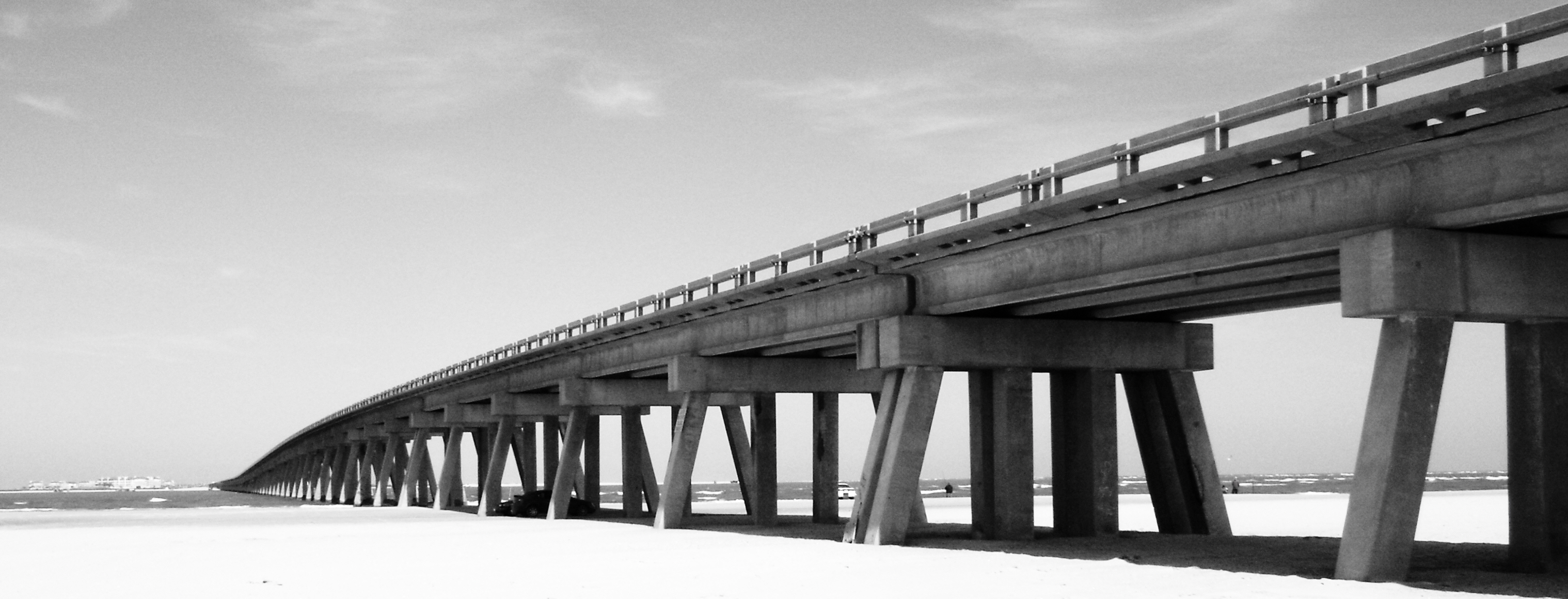
San Luis Pass Bridge spanning San Luis Pass from the Brazoria County side.

== Station San Luis and U.S. Life Saving Service ==
In 1878, the United States Life Saving Service Act authorized the creation of a coastal life saving station near the strait of San Luis Pass. The Station San Luis endured seventy years of coastal service at the west coastline of Galveston Island. The 1949 Texas hurricane delivered a tropical cyclone with an assailable gale and storm surge fatally damaging the San Luis shoreline station. The United States Life-Saving Service discontinued the waterborne search and rescue service by 1950.

== San Luis ==
Across the strait from Galveston, San Luis was an island until 1885, when the strait Little Pass closed. It is now a part of Follet's Island that was once called the Velasco Peninsula.

San Luis, Texas was an abandoned establishment that once had a population of 2,000 after 1836. As of 1989, about 20 people inhabited this area.

The San Luis Pass County Park is on this location.

San Luis Pass at Follets Island and Galveston Island

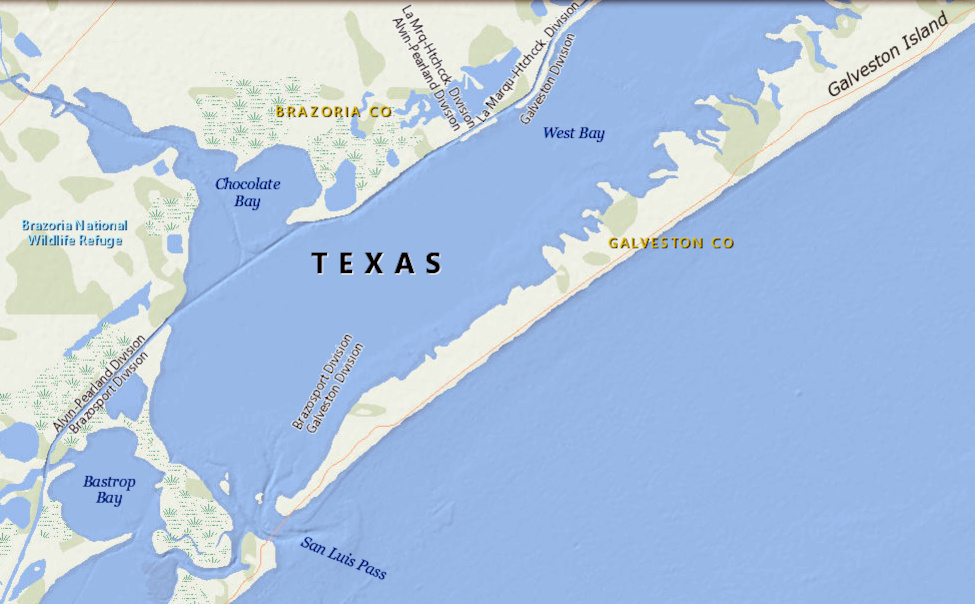
San Luis Pass at Gulf of Mexico and West Bay

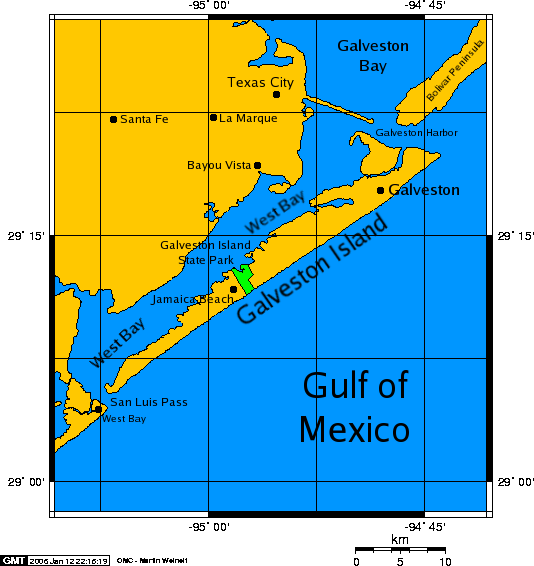
Galveston Island with illustration of San Luis Pass
