= Texas State Highway 100 =

State highway in Texas

State Highway 100
- SH 100 highlighted in red

Route information
- Maintained by TxDOT
- Length: 24.61 mi (39.61 km)
- Existed: 1924–present

Major junctions
- West end: I-69E / US 77 / US 83 / FM 1421 at Russeltown
- East end: PR 100 at the Queen Isabella Memorial Causeway at Port Isabel

Location
- Country: United States
- State: Texas

Highway system
- Highways in Texas; Interstate; US; State; Former; Toll; Loops; Spurs; FM/RM; Park; Rec
← SH 99	→ SH 101

State Highway 100 (SH 100) is a Texas state highway that runs 24 miles (39 km) between "Russeltown" and Port Isabel. It was designated in 1926 along its current route. Its western terminus is at Interstate 69E/U.S. Highway 77/83 and ends at the western end of the Queen Isabella Memorial Causeway at Port Isabel. The route continues as Texas Park Road 100 east and north to a dead end on South Padre Island.

== History ==
SH 100 was designated on September 15, 1924 on most of its current routing in Deep South Texas, but it ended at Gomez Street in Port Isabel. Since its initial construction, the only two changes in the routing was on January 23, 1975, when SH 100 was extended east 0.5 miles replacing the section of PR 100 from Gomez Street to the western end of the Queen Isabella Causeway, and that SH 100 was rerouted the city of Port Isabel, where the route was transferred to separate one way surface streets to better handle flow onto the Queen Isabella Causeway

== Route description ==
SH 100 begins at an intersection with Interstate 69E/U.S. Route 77/U.S. Route 83 and Farm to Market Road 1421 at unincorporated Russelltown (formerly known as Barreda). The route travels due east, passing through downtown Los Fresnos. The route continues east before turning northeast where it formerly met Old Port Isabel Road, which connected Brownsville and Port Isabel. At this point the route becomes a 4-lane divided highway. The route continues northeast and east around the northern edge of Bahia Grande before reaching the southernmost edge of Laguna Vista. The route then turns southeast, running along the coast of the Laguna Madre. Continuing southeast, it passes through the town of Laguna Heights, before reaching the city of Port Isabel. It reaches its eastern terminus at the Queen Isabella Causeway, which continues across the Laguna Madre to South Padre Island as Texas Park Road 100.

== Junction list ==
The entire route is in Cameron County.

Location	mi	km	Destinations	Notes
Brownsville	0.0	0.0	FM 1421 south (Rice Tract Road) / I-69E / US 77 / US 83	Western terminus; interchange; I-69E exit 14
Brownsville	3.5	5.6	FM 803 (Olmito North Road)	
	5.1	8.2	FM 1575 (Old Alice Road)	
Los Fresnos	6.5	10.5	FM 1847 (Arroyo Boulevard)	
Laguna Vista	19.1	30.7	FM 510 (Santa Isabel Boulevard)	
Port Isabel	23.1	37.2	SH 48 west (Brownsville-Port Isabel Highway) – Brownsville	Eastern terminus of SH 48
Laguna Madre			Queen Isabella Causeway	
South Padre Island	24.6	39.6	PR 100 (Padre Boulevard) – Schlitterbahn Beach Waterpark	Eastern terminus
1.000 mi = 1.609 km; 1.000 km = 0.621 mi
