= Texas State Highway 48 =

State highway in Texas

State Highway 48

Route information
- Maintained by TxDOT
- Length: 22.26 mi (35.82 km)
- Existed: by 1930–present

Major junctions
- West end: US 281 / Bus. US 77 in Brownsville
- I-69E / US 77 / US 83 in Brownsville; SH 4 in Brownsville Future I-169 / SH 550 Toll
- East end: SH 100 in Port Isabel

Location
- Country: United States
- State: Texas
- Counties: Cameron

Highway system
- Highways in Texas; Interstate; US; State; Former; Toll; Loops; Spurs; FM/RM; Park; Rec
← SH 47	→ I-49

State Highway 48 (SH 48) runs from Brownsville to Port Isabel in Deep South Texas.

== Route description ==
SH 48 begins at an intersection with Business Route 77 and the southern terminus of U.S. Route 281 on the west side of Brownsville. the road travels east through Brownsville on Boca Chica Boulevard, intersecting I-69E/US 77/US 83. It turns northeast at an intersection with SH 4 and past the Port of Brownsville (the former routing travels through the port grounds). The route then travels across the sandy flats near the coast of the Gulf of Mexico, before reaching its eastern terminus at SH 100 on the far northwestern edge of Port Isabel.

== Route history ==

SH 48 was originally designated on August 21, 1923, from Daingerfield east through Linden to Atlanta as a renumbering of a portion of SH 1A. On June 24, 1931, this route was redesignated as a rerouting of SH 47. SH 48 was instead designated on that same day from Pharr through Harlingen to Brownsville, along the current route of U.S. Highway 83. On November 30, 1932, it was extended west to Mission, replacing part of SH 4. On January 19, 1935, this route was swapped with SH 4, which ran closer to the Rio Grande along Military Highway, and was extended east out of the city to the Port of Brownsville. On September 26, 1939, it was replaced an extension of SH 107 from Mission to Hidalgo and US 281 from Hidalgo to Brownsville, so that only the section from Brownsville to the port was left. On October 28, 1973, SH 48, was signed to Port Isabel along Farm to Market Road 1792. On August 26, 1990, it was officially extended over Farm to Market Road 1792.

== Major intersections ==
The entire route is in Cameron County.

Location	mi	km	Destinations	Notes
Brownsville	0.00	0.00	US 281 west (Boca Chica Boulevard) / Bus. US 77 (Central Boulevard)	Western terminus of SH 48; road continues as US 281 (Boca Chica Boulevard)
Brownsville	1.3	2.1	To I-69E / US 77 / US 83 / Frontage Road	Exit 2 on I-69E.
Brownsville	1.4	2.3	FM 1847 north (Paredes Line Road)	Southern terminus of FM 1847
Brownsville	2.9	4.7	SH 4	
Brownsville	5.5	8.9	FM 313 (Minnesota Avenue)	
Brownsville	5.8	9.3	FM 802 (Reuben M. Torres Boulevard)	
Brownsville	6.4	10.3	FM 511 – Port of Brownsville	Interchange
	7.6	12.2	Future I-169 north / SH 550 Toll west to I-169 north – Harlingen, Port of Brownsville	Interchange
Port Isabel	21.9	35.2	SH 100 – South Padre Island, U.S. Coast Guard	Eastern terminus of SH 48
1.000 mi = 1.609 km; 1.000 km = 0.621 mi: Electronic toll collection; Route transition
