= Texas State Highway 104 =

State highway in Cameron County, Texas, United States

State Highway 104

Route information
- Maintained by TxDOT
- Length: 11.1 mi (17.9 km)
- Existed: 2023–present

Major junctions
- West end: FM 106
- East end: PR 100 in South Padre Island

Location
- Country: United States
- State: Texas
- Counties: Cameron

Highway system
- Highways in Texas; Interstate; US; State; Former; Toll; Loops; Spurs; FM/RM; Park; Rec
← SH 103	→ SH 105

State Highway 104 (SH 104) is a proposed state highway which will run between Farm to Market Road 106 (FM 106) and Park Road 100 (PR 100) in South Padre Island in Cameron County, Texas, United States.

== History ==
=== Former routes ===
A previous route numbered SH 104 was designated on May 25, 1925, as a connector route from Ranger to Morton Valley. On March 28, 1927, this was renumbered to SH 103, as old SH 103 was conditional.

Instead, SH 101, a connector route from Georgetown east to SH 95 at Circleville, was renumbered to SH 104 to avoid duplication with another SH 101. On May 28, 1932, the route was extended west to reach Liberty Hill, and it was completed by 1936. The highway was transferred to SH 29 on August 22, 1951, when it was extended after being supplanted by US Highway 183 on May 23, 1951.

=== Current route ===
SH 104 was designated on December 12, 2023, on its proposed route.
