= Hurricane Dolly (2008) =

Category 2 Atlantic hurricane in 2008

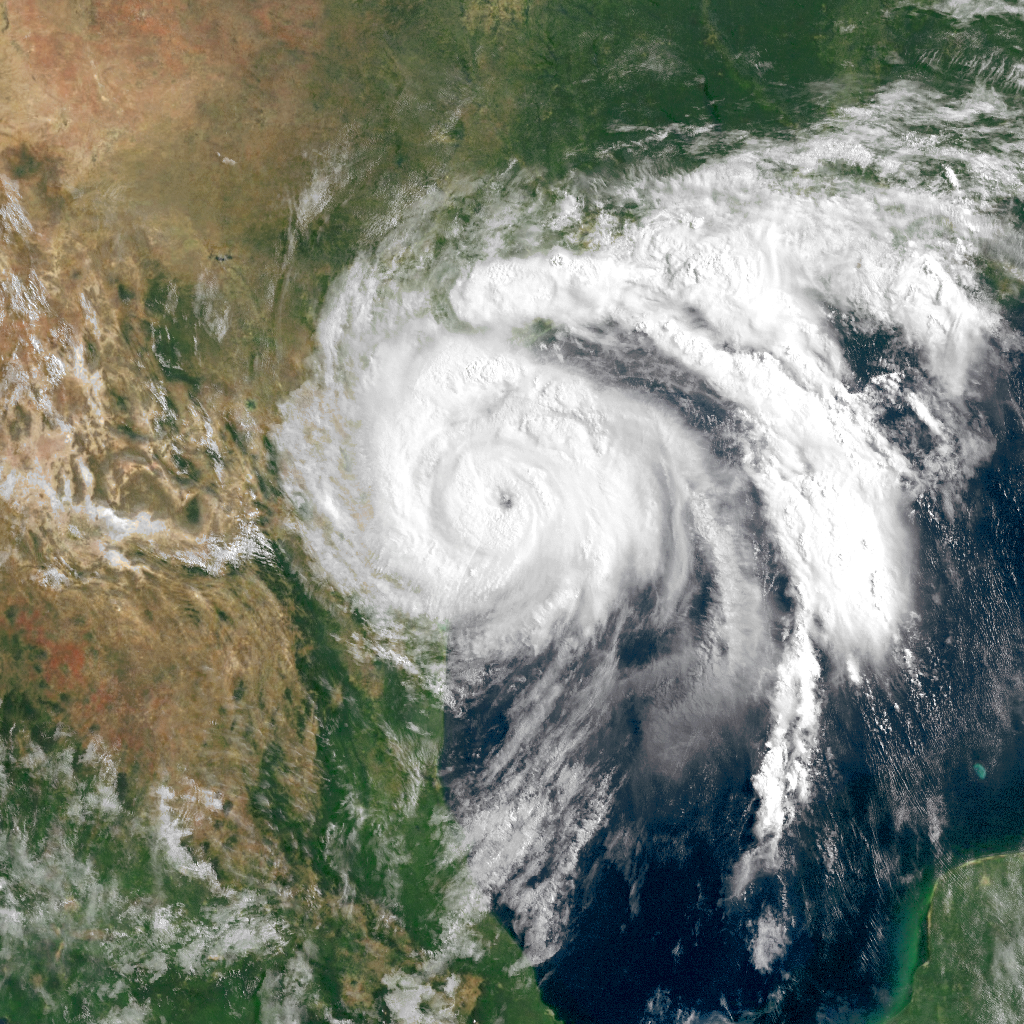
- Dolly at peak intensity, just before landfall on July 23

Meteorological history
- Formed: July 20, 2008
- Remnant low: July 25, 2008
- Dissipated: July 27, 2008

Category 2 hurricane
- 1-minute sustained (SSHWS/NWS)
- Highest winds: 100 mph (155 km/h)
- Lowest pressure: 963 mbar (hPa); 28.44 inHg

Overall effects
- Fatalities: 21
- Damage: $1.6 billion (2008 USD)
- Areas affected: Cayman Islands, Honduras, Belize, Guatemala, Yucatán Peninsula, Mexico, Texas, New Mexico, Arizona
- IBTrACS
- Part of the 2008 Atlantic hurricane season

Hurricane Dolly was a strong tropical cyclone that made landfall in Deep South Texas in July 2008. Dolly was the fourth tropical cyclone and second hurricane to form during the 2008 Atlantic hurricane season. Dolly developed on July 20 from an area of disturbed weather in association with a strong tropical wave. It was named at that time, as the precursor wave already had tropical storm-force winds.

The tropical storm made landfall on the Yucatán Peninsula near Cancún early on July 21, leaving at least 17 people dead in Guatemala. It moved into the Gulf of Mexico and strengthened to become a Category 2 hurricane, before weakening some and making landfall as a Category 1 storm on July 23 in South Padre Island, Texas, with 85 mph (137 km/h) winds. The storm caused 212,000 customers to lose power in Texas as well as 125,000 in Tamaulipas, and dropped estimated amounts of over 16 inches (410 mm) of rain in isolated areas. Rip currents throughout the entire Gulf Coast resulted in one person drowning off the Florida Panhandle. Overall, Hurricane Dolly caused $1.6 billion in damage and 22 deaths. Despite the extensive damage and loss of life from the storm, the name "Dolly" was not retired and was used again in the 2014 season.

== Meteorological history ==
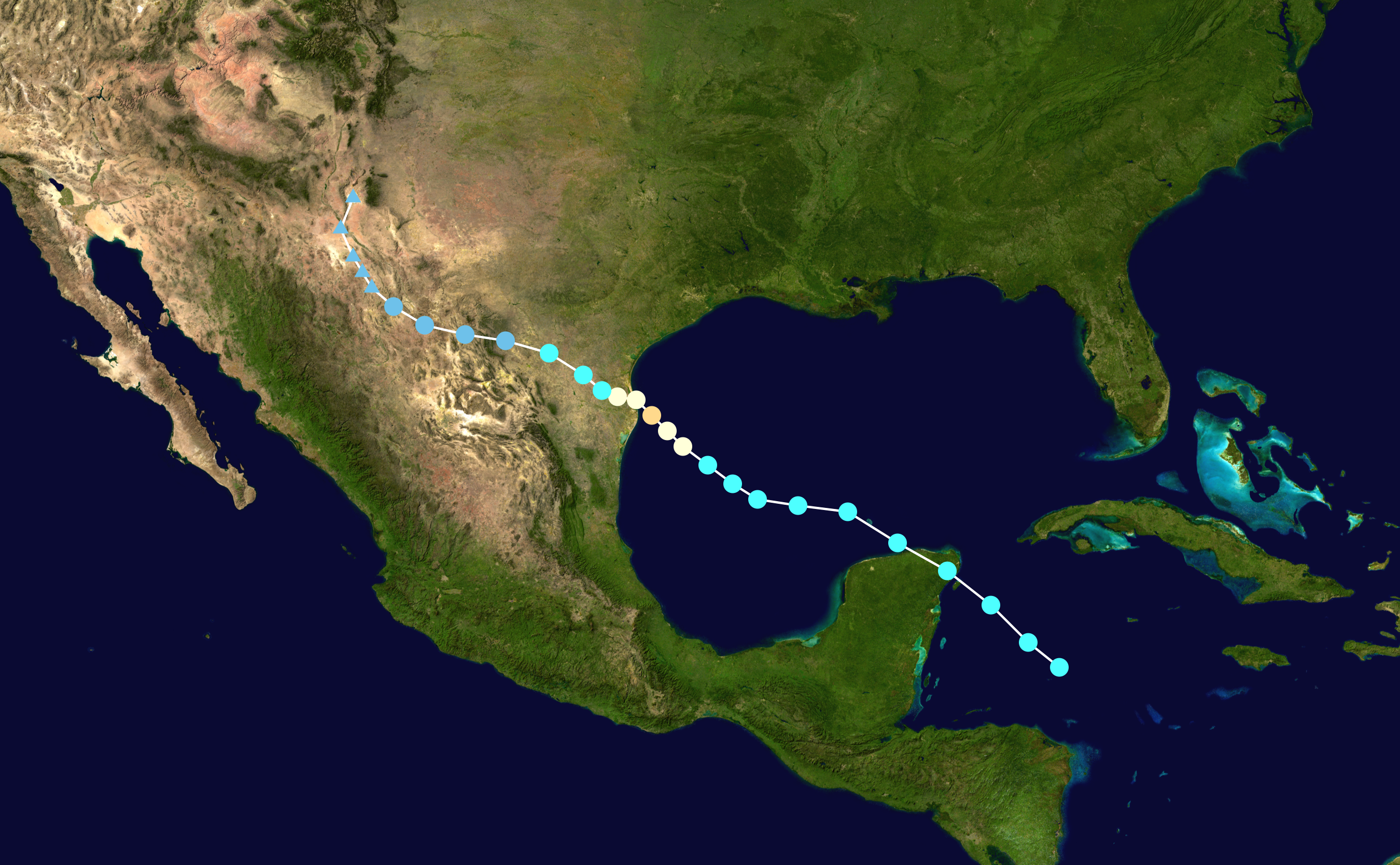
Map plotting the storm's track and intensity, according to the Saffir–Simpson scale Map key Saffir–Simpson scale Tropical depression (≤38 mph, ≤62 km/h) Tropical storm (39–73 mph, 63–118 km/h) Category 1 (74–95 mph, 119–153 km/h) Category 2 (96–110 mph, 154–177 km/h) Category 3 (111–129 mph, 178–208 km/h) Category 4 (130–156 mph, 209–251 km/h) Category 5 (≥157 mph, ≥252 km/h) Unknown Storm type Tropical cyclone Subtropical cyclone Extratropical cyclone, remnant low, tropical disturbance, or monsoon depression

An area of disturbed weather formed over the tropical Atlantic about 1,600 miles (2,600 km) east of the southern Windward Islands on July 13 in association with a strong tropical wave. The wave tracked across the Caribbean Sea during the third week of July. Despite producing strong convection and tropical storm-force sustained winds, it failed to develop a low-level circulation until July 20. That morning, reconnaissance aircraft found a low-level circulation and the system was identified as a tropical cyclone by the National Hurricane Center (NHC). The reconnaissance data showed that the storm had maximum sustained winds exceeding the 34 kn (39 mph; 63 km/h) threshold for tropical storm status. Additionally, buoy data corroborated that the system was producing speeds of this velocity at sea level, so the NHC declared the system to be a tropical storm, bypassing the tropical depression stage altogether, and giving it the name Dolly.

Tropical Storm Dolly in the Gulf of Mexico just after crossing the Yucatan Peninsula

At this point, Dolly was located 270 mi (430 km) east of Chetumal, and 230 mi (370 km) southeast of Cozumel; the tropical storm was expected to make landfall later that day. At the time of Dolly's approach to Quintana Roo, 100,000 tourists were in the state, and 45,000 of them in Cancún. Originally, the storm was forecast by the Servicio Meteorológico Nacional (Mexico's national weather service) to make landfall between Playa del Carmen and Tulum. However, as the storm approached the Quintana Roo coastline, it lost its organization and its surface circulation center disappeared. When the storm was just offshore, it began reorganizing, and a new circulation center formed in the heavy convection on the northern sector of the storm. In essence, this caused the storm to briefly move parallel to the coastline, shifting the point of Dolly's first landfall to north of Cancún. The northward shift also caused the bulk of the storm to stay over water, reducing its impact on the Yucatán Peninsula.

After moving into the Gulf of Mexico, conditions became favorable for additional intensification, with low wind shear and warm sea surface temperatures. Dolly strengthened steadily beginning on July 21, and by the afternoon of July 22, it strengthened into a Category 1 hurricane on the Saffir-Simpson Hurricane Scale. At this point, the storm was located about 165 mi (266 km) east-southeast of Brownsville, Texas. Steady strengthening continued that evening and into the morning of July 23, at which point Dolly reached Category 2 intensity while just east of the Rio Grande Valley at 10:00 that morning with winds of up to 100 mph (160 km/h) and a minimum central pressure of 963 mbar. At 1:00 pm CDT (1800 UTC) that same day, Dolly made landfall on South Padre Island, Texas, slightly weaker as a Category 1 hurricane with 85 mph (137 km/h) sustained winds and a pressure of 967 mbar. Hurricane Dolly then moved west-northwestward over the Laguna Madre crossing onto the mainland near the Cameron-Willacy County line. South Padre Island, Port Isabel, Laguna Vista, Los Fresnos, Bayview, Brownsville, San Benito, Rio Hondo, Arroyo City and especially Harlingen suffered heavy wind and flooding. Hurricane Dolly then thrashed the Delta Region along and north of Highway 107 with its most fierce winds and rain. Towns like Santa Rosa, La Villa, Edcouch, Elsa, Monte Alto and San Carlos were hit hard by the slow-moving, wet hurricane which dumped 10-20 inch rains. According to Mid Valley Town-Crier newspaper, the Weslaco Airport clocked gusts of 68 knots (78 mph). Dolly weakened to a tropical storm after passing US 281 (west of San Manuel and Linn, Texas) late on the 23rd, and then a tropical depression, as it moved slowly inland into Mexico. The circulation weakened into a remnant low over northern Mexico on the afternoon of July 25, then crossed back into the United States, passing through the Ciudad Juárez, Chihuahua/El Paso, Texas metropolitan area on the morning of July 26 and then north across New Mexico. The remnant low of Dolly finally began to dissipate late in the evening of July 27 approximately 100 km (62 mi) west-northwest of Dalhart, Texas.

== Preparations ==
=== Yucatán Peninsula ===
On July 20, the Mexican government issued a tropical storm warning for the Yucatán Peninsula from Campeche to the international border with Belize. A few hours later, Belize's government issued a tropical storm watch from Belize City to the Mexican border.

That same morning, the Quintana Roo Civil Protection authorities in Chetumal declared a "blue alert" for the entire state due to the storm's proximity. This alert was upgraded to an "orange alert" that afternoon, and to a "red alert" that evening. On Cozumel, the ferry service connecting the island to the mainland was suspended, and local government outlawed sales of alcohol and asked residents to stay in their homes after 6:00 pm local time. The state government also ordered the evacuation of 1,000 people from the island of Banco Chinchorro and village of Punta Allen, and evacuations were also ordered in Tulum. Later, evacuation orders were also made for Holbox Island, causing the total number of evacuees to reach 2,000. In the Solidaridad municipality, 238 people were put in shelters to weather out the storm. Elsewhere, five shelters were made available to the population, but only one family of three used them. The Yucatán state government issued a blue alert, followed by an orange alert when the storm approached the state.

=== United States and Mexico ===
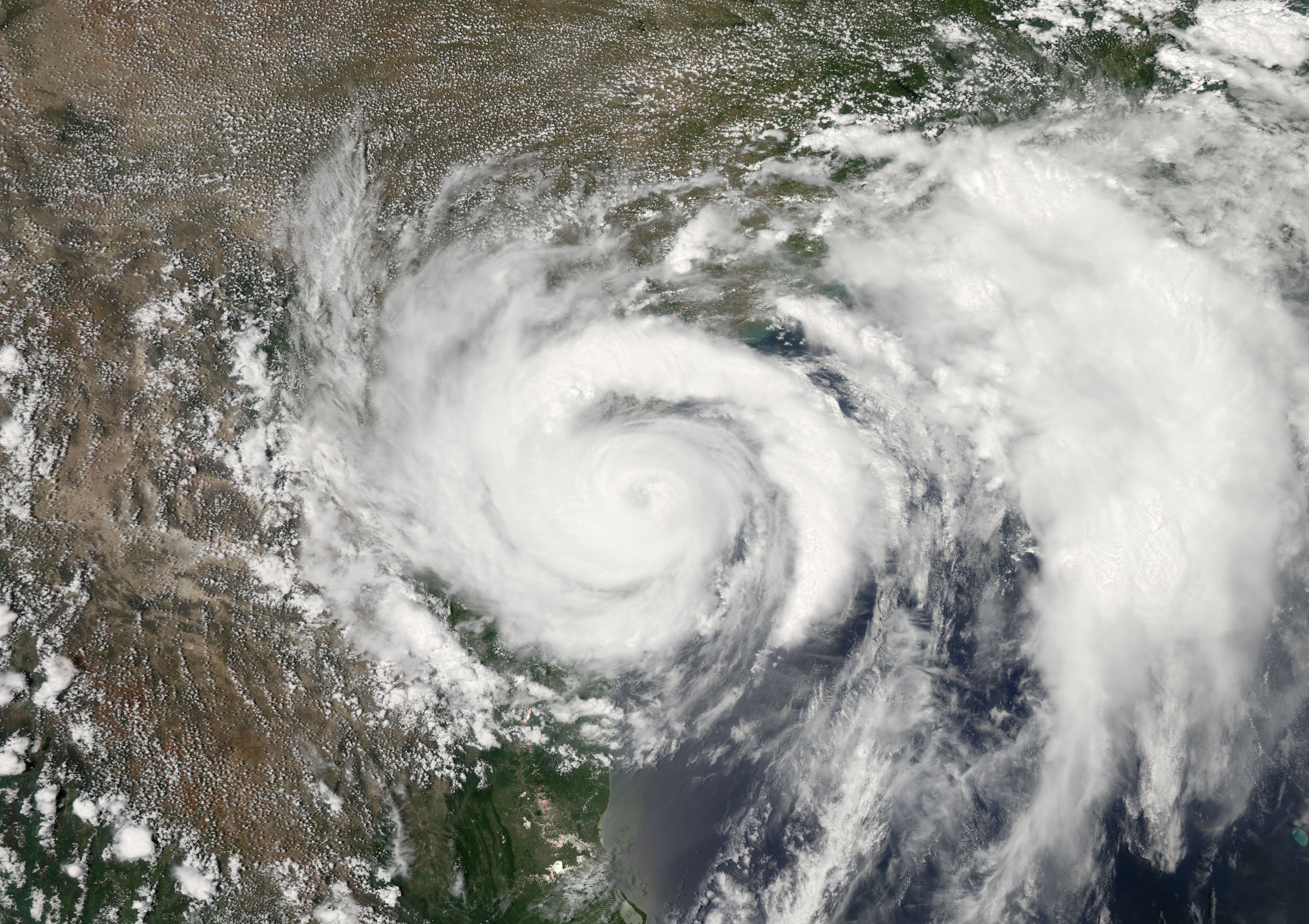
Dolly shortly after moving inland near Laguna Madre, Texas

The National Hurricane Center and the Mexican government issued hurricane watches for the coast between the San Fernando River in Tamaulipas and Port O'Connor, Texas. At the same time, a tropical storm watch was issued for the Texas coast between Port O'Connor and San Luis Pass, and for the Gulf coast from the San Fernando River southward to La Pesca, Tamaulipas. That evening, at 10 p.m. CDT (0300 UTC July 22), the hurricane watches and tropical storm watches in both countries were upgraded to hurricane warnings and tropical storm warnings, respectively. At the same time, the Mexican government issued a hurricane watch between the San Fernando River and La Pesca.

In the Gulf of Mexico, Royal Dutch Shell evacuated 125 personnel from its oil rigs on July 20, and evacuated another 60 on July 21. Diamond Offshore Drilling removed non-essential employees from some of its rigs, and Rowan Companies also evacuated one of its eight oil platforms in the Gulf. Also on July 21, Chevron announced that it was evacuating some of its workers from its oil rigs in the Gulf, but did not disclose how many were removed. On July 22, BP announced the evacuation of non-essential personnel from two of its rigs, and on July 23, Petróleos Mexicanos evacuated 66 people from one of its rigs. In spite of this, oil production was not expected to be affected by Dolly.

In Texas, Governor Rick Perry activated 1,200 members of the Texas Military Forces, among other emergency personnel. Perry also ordered 250 buses to be placed in San Antonio, so they could be used if evacuations became necessary. Perry declared 14 counties of the state as disaster areas on July 22. The Texas Department of Transportation put construction contractors in the Rio Grande Valley on notice of a possible storm. Cameron County emergency officials urged residents living along the Rio Grande to evacuate, for fear of the levees alongside the river bursting. Port of Brownsville officials also decided to close the port at midnight Wednesday, July 23, through midnight Friday, July 25. The United States Navy removed 104 airplanes from Truax Field and flew them to bases further inland, and Immigration and Customs Enforcement evacuated its detention facility in Port Isabel.

On July 21, the state of Veracruz put 166 municipalities in preventive alert, and expected that the storm would exacerbate existing flooding. In Tamaulipas, state authorities put the municipalities of Soto la Marina, San Fernando, Matamoros, Valle Hermoso, Río Bravo and Reynosa on alert and prepared shelters. Later, on July 22, 23,000 people were planned to be evacuated from Matamoros, Soto la Marina and San Fernando; however, of those, only about 13,000 followed the evacuation order, and were placed in 21 shelters. 15 shelters—with a capacity to hold 4,500 people—were activated in Reynosa. On the night of July 22, the federal government, through the Secretaría de Gobernación (SEGOB), declared a state of emergency in 17 municipalities, making them eligible to receive federal assistance funding. SEGOB also ordered 600 Army troops and 350 Marines deployed to Tamaulipas, a number that later grew to 4,800 military and police. Further inland, on July 21, the Nuevo León state government began to prepare 300 shelters throughout the state, and the Coahuila state government announced a state of alert the next day. On July 23, Coahuila authorities emitted an orange alert due to the risk of flooding from Dolly's remnants, and activated 2,000 military and police to the state.

== Impact ==
Coast Guard video of the aftermath of Hurricane Dolly in south Texas

=== Northwestern Caribbean ===
In Guatemala, the rain caused landslides and at least 17 deaths, with 12 members of one family killed near La Unión in the department of Zacapa and four from another family in San Pedro Soloma, Huehuetenango. One more person drowned after trying to cross the flooded Punilá River in La Unión. Before it made landfall, Dolly caused heavy rain in western Cuba, primarily in the provinces of Isla de la Juventud, Pinar del Río and La Habana. In Mexico, the state of Quintana Roo reported no deaths from the storm, and no major damage was reported in Cancún; however, the city reported significant beach erosion. Four fisherman were reported missing after Dolly passed over the Yucatán peninsula, and one of them was found dead on the beach near Puerto Progreso, Yucatán.

=== United States ===
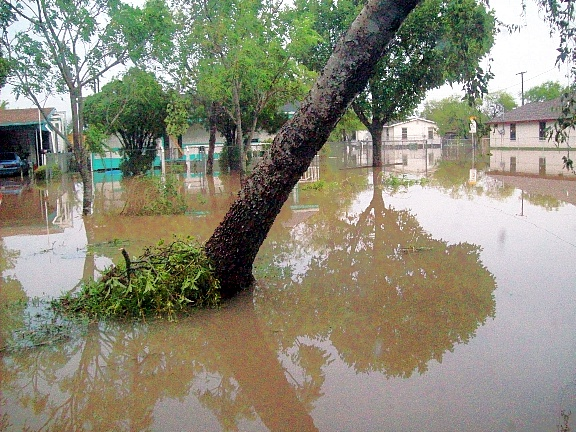
Flooding from Hurricane Dolly

In the United States, President George W. Bush declared 15 counties of Texas as a federal disaster area. Hurricane Dolly is considered to be the most destructive hurricane to hit the Rio Grande Valley in 41 years; the last such storm was Beulah in 1967, but Beulah was not more damaging; it was just deadlier. It was the worst hurricane to hit Brownsville since 1980's Allen. Official NHC Tropical Cyclone Report notes storm surge of up to 4 ft at South Padre Island. No deaths were reported as a result of the storm, but one boy was injured after falling seven floors from a condominium balcony in South Padre Island. Early on July 23, an apartment complex roof partially collapsed in South Padre Island. Power was knocked out to more than 13,000 customers in Cameron County, Texas and 15,100 in Hidalgo County, Texas. Sustained winds were estimated at 100 mph with gusts of 120 mph when Dolly made landfall. Dolly's strongest winds and heaviest rains were generally on the left or south side of the eyewall. The winds blew signs off of many hotels. Residents of Brownsville reported downed tree limbs, among other small damages. In addition, at least two tornadoes were reported in San Patricio County, well to the north of the landfall location. One of them uprooted trees and knocked over several roofs and weak structures. By noon on July 23, the storm had left 36,000 customers in south Texas without electric power, a number that rose to 61,000 by 3:00 p.m, and to 122,800 by 6:00 p.m. At the height of the disaster, some 155,000 homes were without electricity. The damage in South Texas was much more destructive than what was predicted. Dozens of homes and businesses were destroyed with hundreds more damaged, and the storm surge caused many boats to be brought onshore, some into homes.

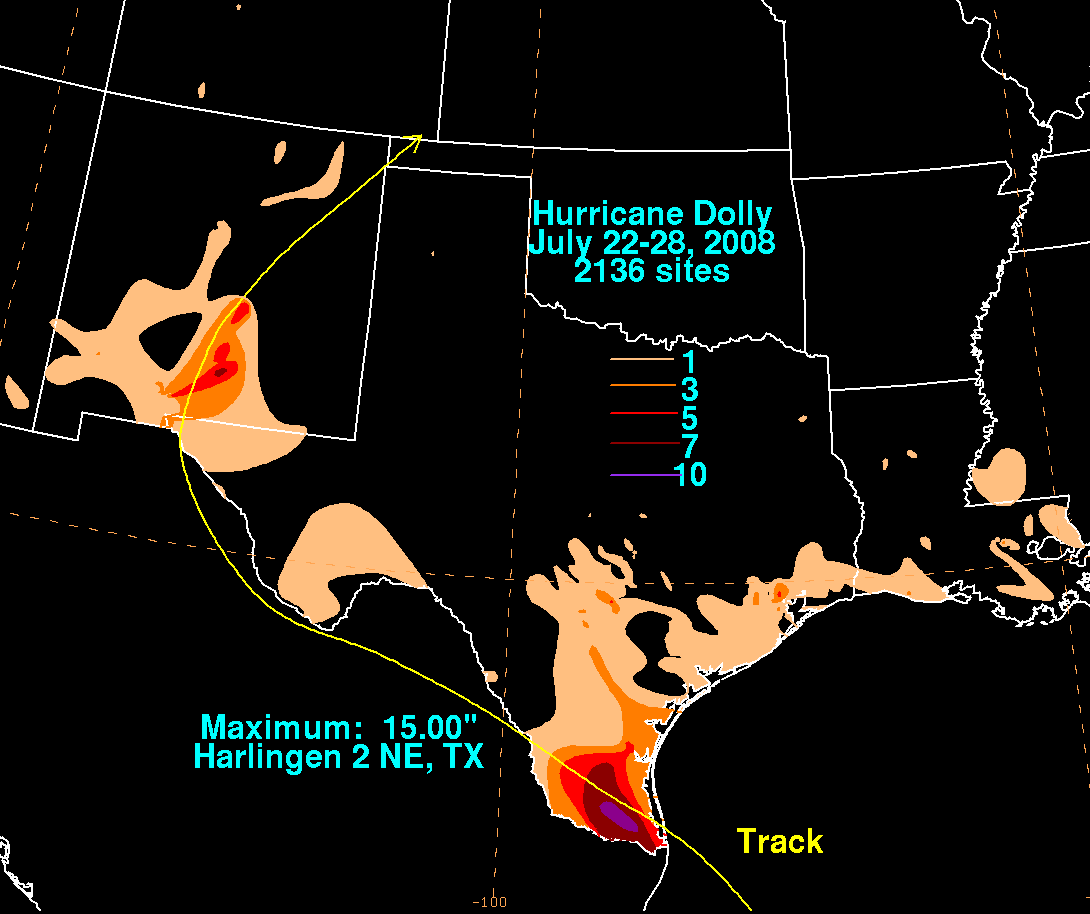
Storm total rainfall from Dolly

The Governor of Texas, Rick Perry, declared 14 counties in South Texas a disaster area. Insured property damage estimates are near $525 million (2008 USD) with total property damage estimates (based on a 2–1 ratio of total damage to insured damage) near $1.3 billion (2008 USD) in the state (with a large proportion of the losses being agricultural), and the Rio Grande cotton crop was expected to be a complete loss. After weakening to a tropical storm, Dolly spun off another tornado near Poth early on July 24 with minor damage. Near noon on July 24, an EF0 tornado touched down in the southern edge of downtown San Antonio near the Interstate 10–Interstate 37 interchange. Significant damage was reported in the area, with several commercial buildings losing their roofs and numerous houses damaged. Damage was also reported at the Windcrest Tower. About 1,500 customers lost power as a result. Flash flooding from the remnant low of Dolly occurred in El Paso, Texas, on July 26: one person was killed in an adjacent portion of New Mexico from a weather-related traffic accident. Additional flash flooding and river flooding on the Rio Ruidoso in the Sacramento Mountains of New Mexico occurred on the morning of July 27, after more than 6 in (150 mm) of rainfall from Dolly's remnants: hundreds of tourists, campers and residents were evacuated and the storm caused damage at the Ruidoso Downs racetrack. One person was killed in the Rio Ruidoso flooding, approximately 900 persons required rescue, approximately 500 structures were damaged, and initial damage estimates for Ruidoso, New Mexico were in the range of $15–20 million. Further north, Dolly became only the second Atlantic hurricane to drop rainfall in the state of Colorado.

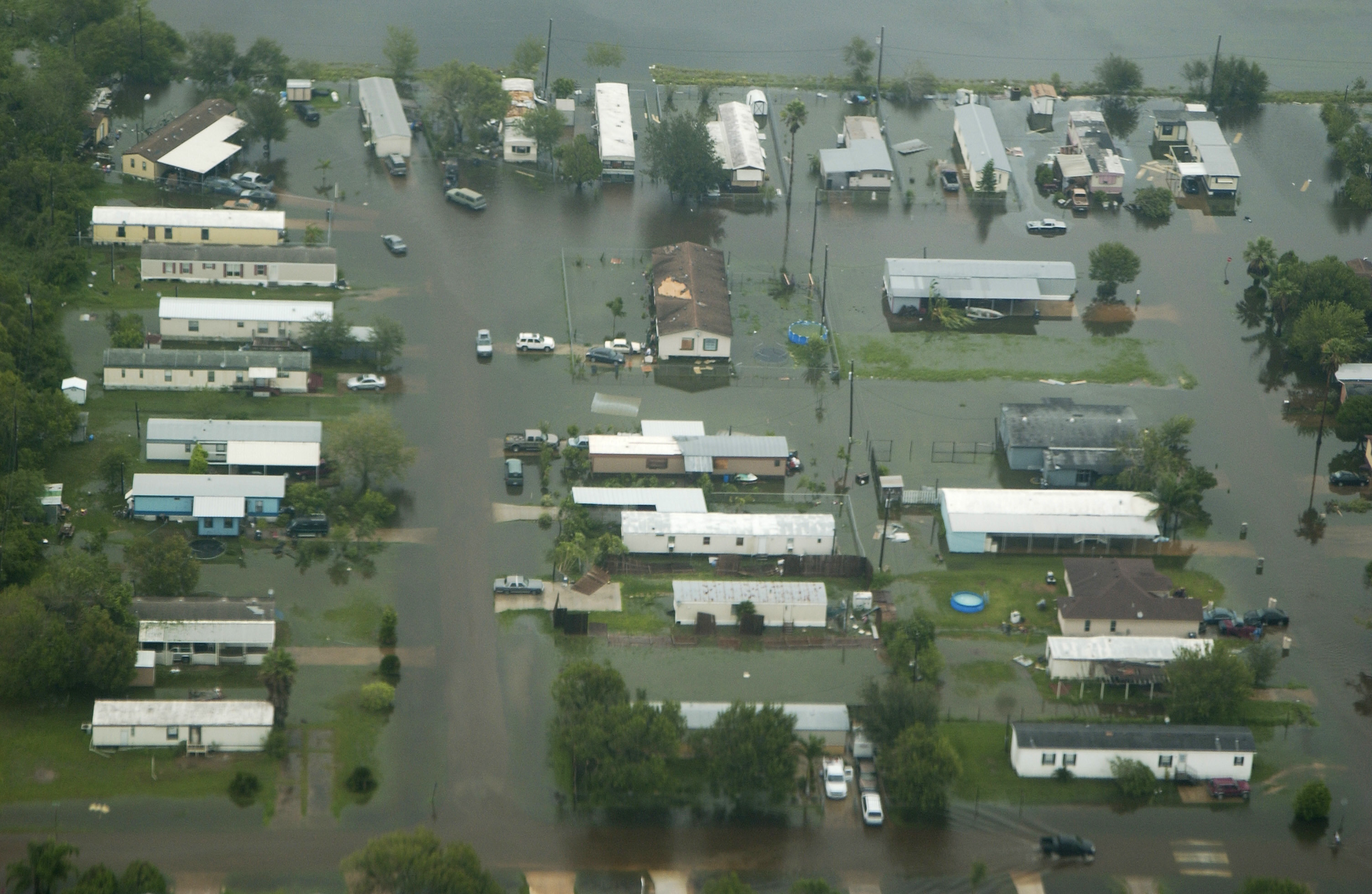
Flooding in southern Texas, as taken from a United States Coast Guard aircraft

Distant effects included high waves and rip currents throughout the Central and Eastern Gulf Coast. One person was killed and at least nine others had to be rescued from Panama City Beach, Florida, as a result of rip currents caused by Dolly. The storm contributed to a $2.16 price increase in oil futures in the New York Mercantile Exchange on July 21, although prices fell again after Dolly missed most of the oil rigs in the Gulf. The Minerals Management Service indicated that Dolly caused 4.66% of the total oil production and 5.13% of the natural gas production to be shut in. The remnants of Dolly also impacted parts of the Midwest, including the states of Illinois, Indiana, Tennessee, and some parts of southern Missouri, causing severe weather reports and some damage of property.

=== Mexico ===
In Matamoros, Tamaulipas, downed power lines fell on floodwaters and electrocuted one man. The hurricane caused 19 colonias to lose electric power, and about 125,000 users lost power the night after Dolly's second landfall. 111 colonias were flooded, and 50 of those suffered severe flooding. The storm also knocked down trees, billboards and traffic signals in the city. Soldiers rescued a family trapped in their home near the mouth of the Rio Grande. On July 26, the remnant low of Dolly dropped heavy rains on Ciudad Juarez, Chihuahua, causing landslides, flooding, the collapse of a historic church and evacuation of numerous colonias. Damage estimates in Mexico are around $300 million (2008 USD).

== See also ==
- Other storms of the same name
- Timeline of the 2008 Atlantic hurricane season
- Hurricane Gert
- Hurricane Alex (2010)
- Hurricane Ike
- Hurricane Harvey
- Hurricane Hanna (2020)
- List of Texas hurricanes (1980-present)
