= Aero Country Airport =

Privately owned airport in McKinney, Texas, United States

- IATA: none; ICAO: none; FAA LID: T31

Summary
- Airport type: Public
- Owner: Aero Country Property Owners Association
- Serves: McKinney, Texas
- Location: 255 Aero Country Rd, McKinney, TX 75071
- Elevation AMSL: 765 ft (233 m)
- Coordinates: 33°12′31″N 096°44′31″W
- Website: https://aero-country.herokuapp.com/

Map
- Location within Texas

Runways
Direction	Length		Surface
Direction	ft	m	Surface
17/35	4,352	1,326	Asphalt/Turf

Statistics (2015)
- Aircraft operations: 9,000
- Based aircraft: 244
- Sources: Federal Aviation Administration except as noted

Aero Country Airport (FAA LID: T31) is a privately owned public airport 4 nautical miles (7.4 km) west of the central business district of McKinney, Texas, United States. The airport has no IATA or ICAO designation.

The airport is used solely for general aviation purposes.

Aero Country previously used the FAA LID of TX05 until at least July 1997. The FAA LID of T31 was previously used for Port Isabel-Cameron County Airport in Port Isabel, Texas until at least July 1992. (Note: It is unclear exactly when the designation changes took place. A National Transportation Safety Board report for an accident at Port Isabel-Cameron County Airport on 3 July 1992 uses the T31 designation; however, that airport is currently assigned the ICAO designation of KPIL and the FAA LID of PIL. An NTSB report for an accident that took place at Aero Country in July 1997 uses an FAA LID of TX05.)

== Facilities ==
Aero Country Airport covers 36 acres (15 ha) at an elevation of 765 feet (233 m) above mean sea level and has one runway:

- Runway 17/35: 4,352 x 60 ft. (1,326 x 18 m), Surface: Asphalt/Turf

For the year ending December 31, 2015, the airport had 9,000 aircraft operations, averaging 25 per day: 100% general aviation. 244 aircraft were then based at this airport: 90% single-engine, 7% multi-engine, 2% helicopters, and 1% gliders.

== Accidents and incidents ==
- 2 April 1983: Three passengers disembarked from a de Havilland Canada DHC-6 Twin Otter, registration number N927BA, while the engines were still running, despite having been instructed by the aircrew prior to the flight not to exit until the engines were shut down. One passenger walked into the rotating left-hand propeller and suffered a fatal head injury; the other passengers were not injured. The accident was attributed to inadequate verbal instructions and supervision of the passengers by the pilot in command, and to the failure of the passengers to understand the pilot's instructions. A contributing factor was unsafe actions by the passengers.
- 19 July 1997: A Rans S-9, registration number N1678N, lost engine power after a high-speed pass over the runway. The pilot attempted to turn back and land, but the craft stalled and went into a spin during the "very tight" 180° turn. The S-9 impacted the ground in a near-vertical attitude, killing the pilot and sole occupant. The accident was attributed to "loss of engine power for undetermined reason(s), and failure of the pilot to maintain adequate airspeed, while maneuvering for a forced landing, which resulted in a stall and collision with the terrain."
- 9 January 2001: A Nord 1101 Noralpha, registration number N208BF, lost engine power on takeoff and was badly damaged in a subsequent off-airport forced landing, seriously injuring the pilot; the single passenger suffered no injuries. The aft throttle linkage assembly's push/pull rod was found separated from the support bushing. The accident was attributed to "the loss of engine power during takeoff resulting from the inadequate engagement of the throttle torque tube rod end into the support bushing by unknown maintenance personnel."
- 31 December 2016: A Piper PA-28R-200 Arrow, registration number N4407T, and a Luscombe 8A, registration number N2889K, collided in mid-air in the airfield traffic pattern approximately 1/2 mi (0.8 km) east of the airport. The Piper crashed into a storage facility, starting a substantial fire that damaged a stored boat; the blaze thwarted bystanders' attempts to rescue the pilot, who was killed. The collision severed the empennage of the Luscombe, which then crashed in the southbound lanes of Custer Road near Virginia Parkway; the pilot and single passenger died. Investigators determined that neither aircraft maneuvered to avoid the collision and that both pilots had likely been unable to see the other's aircraft. Furthermore, the Piper pilot crossed midfield at traffic pattern altitude rather than at least 500 feet (150 m) above pattern altitude as prescribed in FAA guidance material, and witnesses did not hear the Piper pilot declare his intentions on the common traffic advisory frequency, while the Luscombe pilot had done so. The accident was attributed to "The [Piper] pilot's use of an alternate traffic pattern entry procedure, which resulted in his inability to see and avoid the other airplane, which was flying the preferred traffic pattern, and the subsequent midair collision."
- 11 November 2023: A single-engine Lancair IV-P flying from Midland, Texas overshot the runway at Aero Country Airport during an attempted emergency landing. The plane crashed into a fence before colliding with a sedan traveling east on Virginia Parkway. One person was taken to the hospital with minor injuries. The FAA is investigating the cause of the crash.

== See also ==
- List of airports in Texas
