= Texas Park Road 100 =

State road in Cameron County, Texas, United States

PR 100
- Ocean Boulevard
- PR 100 highlighted in red

Route information
- Maintained by TxDOT
- Length: 13.918 mi (22.399 km)
- Existed: February 29, 1968–present

Major junctions
- South end: SH 100 at the Queen Isabella Causeway in Port Isabel
- North end: Padre Island National Seashore

Location
- Country: United States
- State: Texas
- Counties: Cameron

Highway system
- Highways in Texas; Interstate; US; State; Former; Toll; Loops; Spurs; FM/RM; Park; Rec
| ← SH 99 | → SH 101 |

Park Road 100 (PR 100) is a park road in the Rio Grande Valley in Cameron County, in the U.S. state of Texas. It runs along South Padre Island through the town of the same name.

== Route description ==
PR 100 begins at the Queen Isabella Causeway in Port Isabel, and continues west as State Highway 100. A 2.37-mile bridge crosses Laguna Madre, the only road connecting South Padre Island to the mainland. It then enters the town of South Padre Island and intersects itself near the Schlitterbahn water park and resort. The section of the road south of this intersection acts as a spur for the southernmost part of the island. It continues north through the island/city, passing many resorts, bars and restaurants. Just north of Edwin King Atwood Park, it runs for about half a mile between the Laguna Madre and the Gulf of Mexico before running only a few feet east of the former. It ends shortly after entering the Padre Island National Seashore.

== Junction list ==
The entire road is in Cameron County.

| Location | mi | km | Destinations | Notes |
|---|---|---|---|---|
| Port Isabel | 0.0 | 0.0 | SH 100 west – Brownsville, Harlingen | |
| Laguna Madre | 2.3 | 3.7 | Queen Isabella Causeway | |
| South Padre Island | 2.7 | 4.3 | PR 100 south | Spur serving southernmost portion of island |
| Padre Island National Seashore | 13.9 | 22.4 | Road dead ends | |
1.000 mi = 1.609 km; 1.000 km = 0.621 mi
