= Port Isabel-Cameron County Airport =

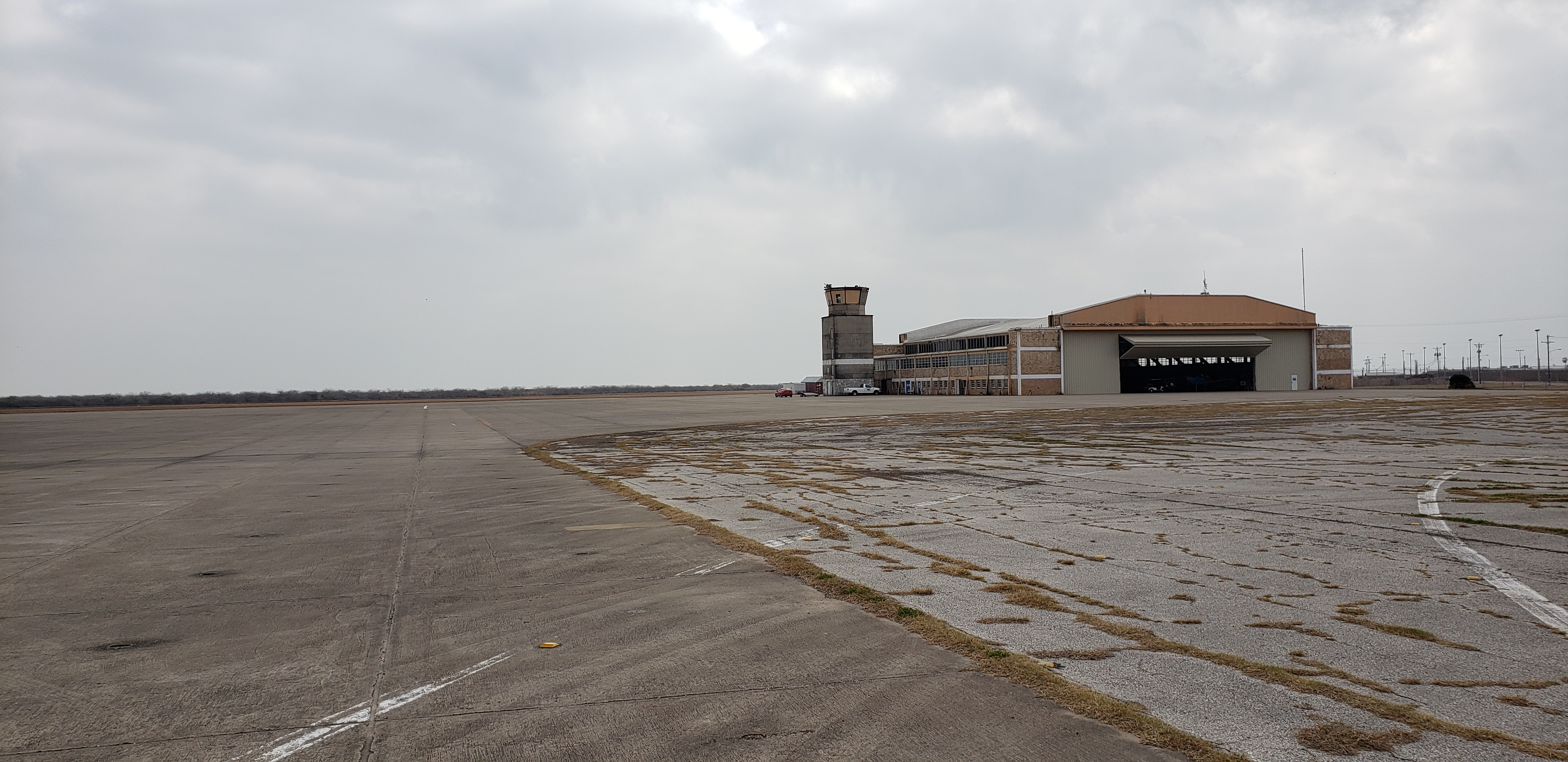
- Original control tower and hangar
- IATA: none; ICAO: KPIL; FAA LID: PIL

Summary
- Airport type: Public
- Owner: Cameron County
- Serves: Port Isabel, Texas
- Location: 27617 Buena Vista Blvd, Los Fresnos, TX 78566
- Elevation AMSL: 18.6 ft / 5.7 m
- Coordinates: 26°09′58″N 097°20′45″W

Map
- Location of airport in Texas

Runways
Direction	Length		Surface
Direction	ft	m	Surface
03/21	5,000	1,524	Asphalt/concrete
08/26	5,317	1,621	Concrete
13/31	8,001	2,439	Asphalt/concrete
17/35	4,200	1,280	Asphalt/concrete

Statistics (2017)
- Aircraft operations: 29,420
- Based aircraft: 13
- Sources: Federal Aviation Administration unless noted otherwise

Port Isabel-Cameron County Airport (ICAO: KPIL, FAA LID: PIL) is a public airport in Cameron County, Texas, United States, serving the city of Port Isabel, Texas. Most U.S. airports use the same three-letter location identifier for the FAA and IATA, but Port Isabel-Cameron County Airport is assigned PIL by the FAA and has no IATA designation. IATA assigned PIL to Carlos Miguel Jiménez Airport in Pilar, Paraguay.

The Port Isabel Detention Center, operated by U.S. Immigration and Customs Enforcement, is located adjacent to the airport.

The airport previously used the FAA LID of T31 until at least July 1992. (Note: It is unclear exactly when the designation changes took place. A National Transportation Safety Board report for an accident at Port Isabel-Cameron County Airport on 3 July 1992 uses the T31 designation.) This designation was subsequently reassigned to Aero Country Airport in McKinney, Texas.

== History ==
The airfield was built by the U.S. military in the 1940s and used by the United States Army Air Forces and United States Navy for gunnery training. The base was closed in the early 1960s and most base facilities were turned over to the U.S. Immigration and Customs Enforcement in 1961-1963 for renovation and reuse as a detention facility. The hangars and runways were turned over to the Cameron County Commissioners in 1963 to be used as a civil airport.

== Facilities ==
Port Isabel-Cameron County Airport covers 826 acres (334 ha) at an elevation of 18.6 feet (5.7 m) above mean sea level. It has four runways:

- Runway 03/21: 5,000 x 150 ft. (1,524 x 46 m), surface: asphalt/concrete
- Runway 08/26: 5,317 x 150 ft. (1,621 x 46 m), surface: concrete
- Runway 13/31: 8,001 x 200 ft. (2,439 x 61 m), surface: asphalt/concrete
- Runway 17/35: 4,200 x 75 ft. (1,280 x 23 m), surface: asphalt/concrete

For the 12-month period ending 11 January 2017, the airport had 29,420 aircraft operations, an average of 81 per day: 54% military, 46% general aviation, and less than 1% air taxi. At that time there were 13 aircraft based at this airport: 46% single-engine, 46% multi-engine, and 8% gliders, with no jets nor helicopters.

== See also ==
- List of airports in Texas
