= Point Isabel Light =

Historic lighthouse located in Port Isabel, Texas, United States

- Point Isabel Lighthouse
- U.S. National Register of Historic Places
- Texas State Historic Site
- Texas State Antiquities Landmark
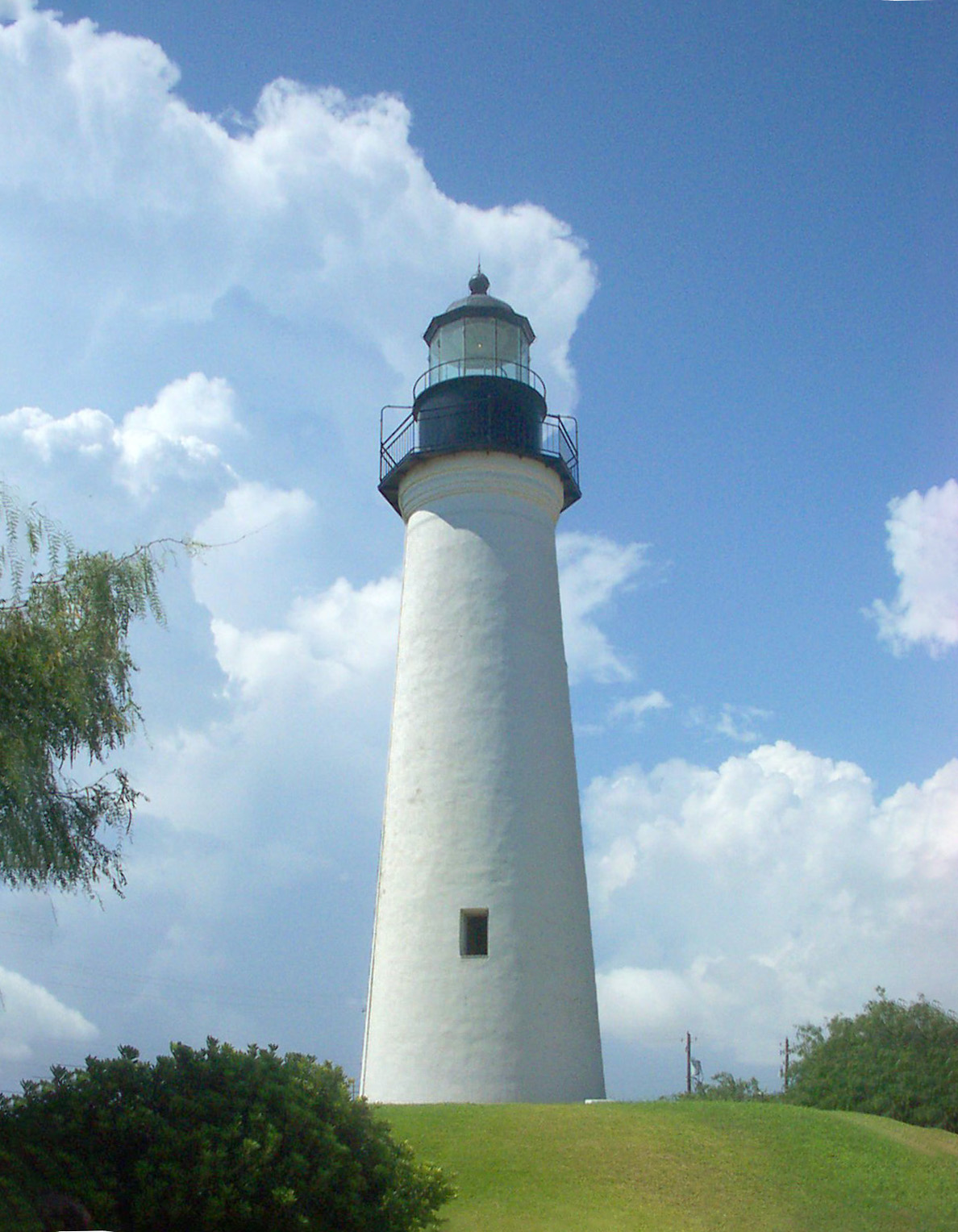
- The Point (Port) Isabel Lighthouse in 2003

- Location within Texas Location within the United States
- Location: Off SH 100; Port Isabel, Texas
- Coordinates: 26°4′39″N 97°12′30″W
- Area: 0.6 acres (0.24 ha)
- Built: 1852
- Built by: U.S. Department of Treasury
- NRHP reference No.: 76002014
- TSAL No.: 8200000158

Significant dates
- Added to NRHP: April 30, 1976
- Designated TSHS: 1952
- Designated TSAL: January 1, 1983

The Point (Port) Isabel Lighthouse is a historic lighthouse located in Port Isabel, Texas, United States that was built in 1852 to guide ships through the Brazos Santiago Pass to Port Isabel. The lighthouse was added to the National Register of Historic Places on April 30, 1976.

On September 28, 1850, the United States Congress authorized an appropriation of $15,000 for "a lighthouse and beacon light" at Brazos Santiago Pass. Work began in February 1852. When complete, the lighthouse was an 82-foot-high brick tower and had four lights. By 1854, it had 15 lamps and 21 reflectors. A third order fresnel lens was installed in 1857 and the rotating light was varied by flashes.

During the American Civil War the Point (Port) Isabel Lighthouse was occupied by soldiers from both sides as a look-out post. After the Civil War, the lighthouse was refitted and returned to operation in 1866. In 1888, the light was temporarily discontinued as claimants proved that the United States government did not have title to the land, forcing the government to condemn the land in 1894 to acquire title. On July 15, 1895, the light returned to use. It operated for ten years, after which time it was extinguished in 1905. On Sept. 20, 1927, the government sold the lighthouse and land. A local citizen purchased it. In the late 1940s, a movement began to save the lighthouse as a historic site. On October 5, 1950, the Texas State Park Board accepted the lighthouse and surrounding land as a gift from Mr. and Mrs. Lon C. Hill Jr., the owners at the time.

The Texas State Park Board began restoring the lighthouse in 1951, and it was opened to the public in 1952. In September 1996, a new visitors center was completed.

Today the lighthouse is operated as Port Isabel Lighthouse State Historic Site.

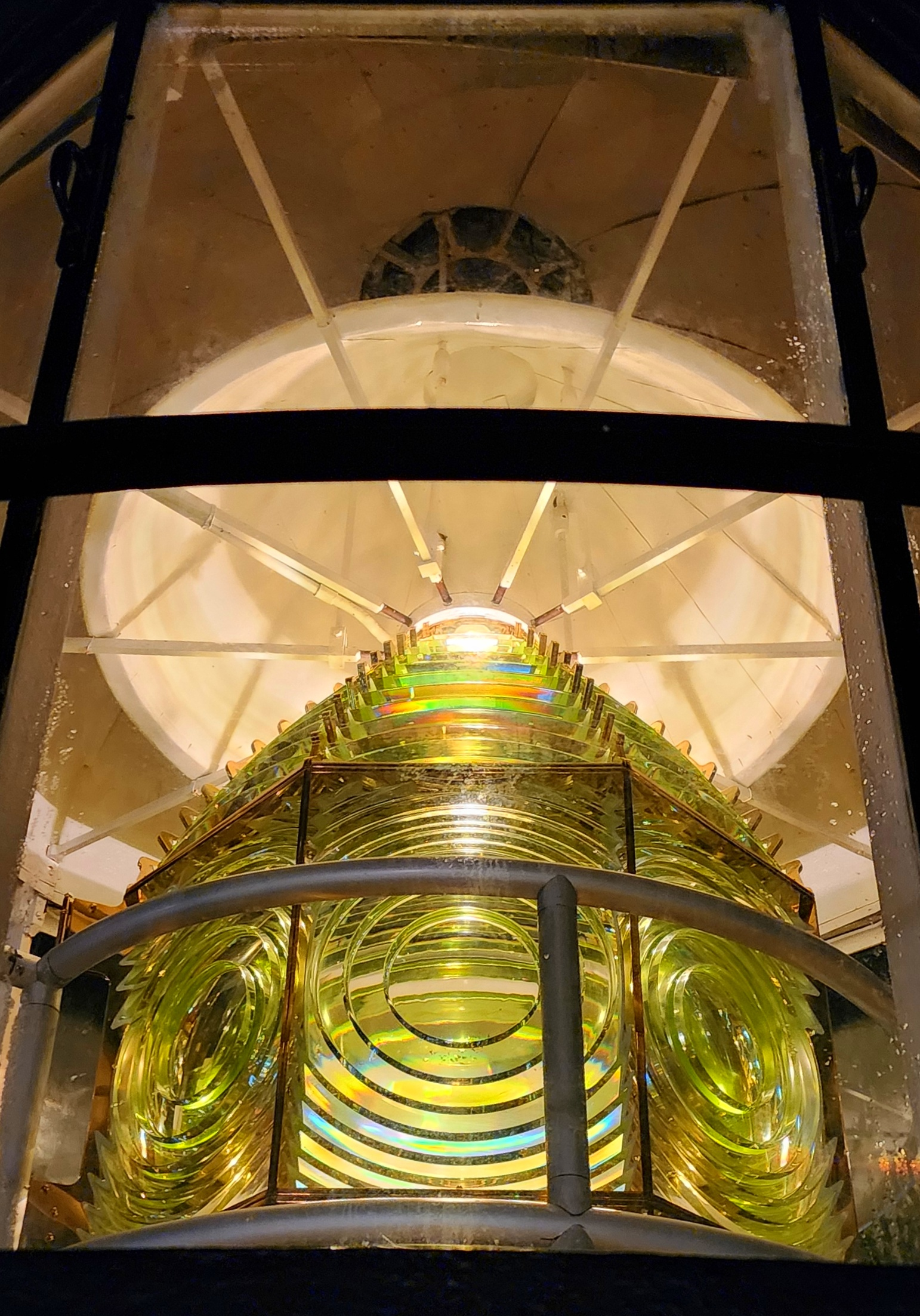
A 3rd Order Fresnel Lens was installed in the Port Isabel Lighthouse and a celebration held on December 9, 2022.

On November 16-17, 2022, a reproduction 3rd Order Fresnel Lens was installed in the Lighthouse and a celebration held on December 9, 2022.

The site is owned by the Texas Historical Commission but operated by the City of Port Isabel.

== See also ==
- National Register of Historic Places listings in Cameron County, Texas
- List of Texas State Historic Sites
