= Texas State Highway 47 =

State highway in Texas

State Highway 47
- John Sharp Parkway

Route information
- Maintained by TxDOT
- Length: 7.146 mi (11.500 km)
- Existed: 1987–present

Major junctions
- South end: FM 60 at College Station
- FM 1179 in Bryan; FM 1688 in Bryan
- North end: SH 21 near Bryan

Location
- Country: United States
- State: Texas
- Counties: Brazos

Highway system
- Highways in Texas; Interstate; US; State; Former; Toll; Loops; Spurs; FM/RM; Park; Rec
← SH 46	→ SH 48

State Highway 47 (SH 47) runs from FM 60 near Easterwood Airport and the West Campus of Texas A&M University in College Station to SH 21 at Texas A&M University-Riverside near Bryan. This highway was designated on January 28, 1987. SH 47 was completed in August 1996 and was designed primarily to provide a shorter route between the Texas A&M main campus in College Station and SH 21 west of Bryan.

== Previous routes ==

SH 47 was originally planned on August 21, 1923, along a previous section of SH 1A and SH 1C from near the Texas–Arkansas–Louisiana tripoint, northwest through Atlanta, then northeast through Texarkana to the Arkansas state line north of Texarkana. On June 24, 1931, the highway was rerouted west from Atlanta to Daingerfield, replacing SH 48, while the old route southeast of Atlanta became part of SH 77 On April 19, 1938, SH 47 Bypass was designated from SH 47 to SH 1. SH 47 Bypass extended north to SH 5 on October 24, 1938. On September 26, 1939, this classification was canceled when the route was transferred to SH 11. SH 47 Bypass became Loop 14.

== Junction list ==
The entire route is in Brazos County. All exits are unnumbered.

Location	mi	km	Destinations	Notes
College Station	0.00	0.00	FM 60 east – College Station, Texas A&M University	Southern terminus; serves Easterwood Airport
Bryan	0.8	1.3	FM 60 west / HSC Parkway	Northbound signed as HSC Pkwy. only
Bryan	2.2	3.5	FM 1179 east (Villa Maria Road) / Jones Road	North end of expressway
Bryan	3.4	5.5	FM 1688 east (Leonard Road)	
	7.2	11.6	SH 21 – Caldwell, Bryan	Partial interchange; western terminus; no access from SH 21 westbound
1.000 mi = 1.609 km; 1.000 km = 0.621 mi: Incomplete access
