= South Padre Island, Texas =

Incorporated town in Texas, US

- Town
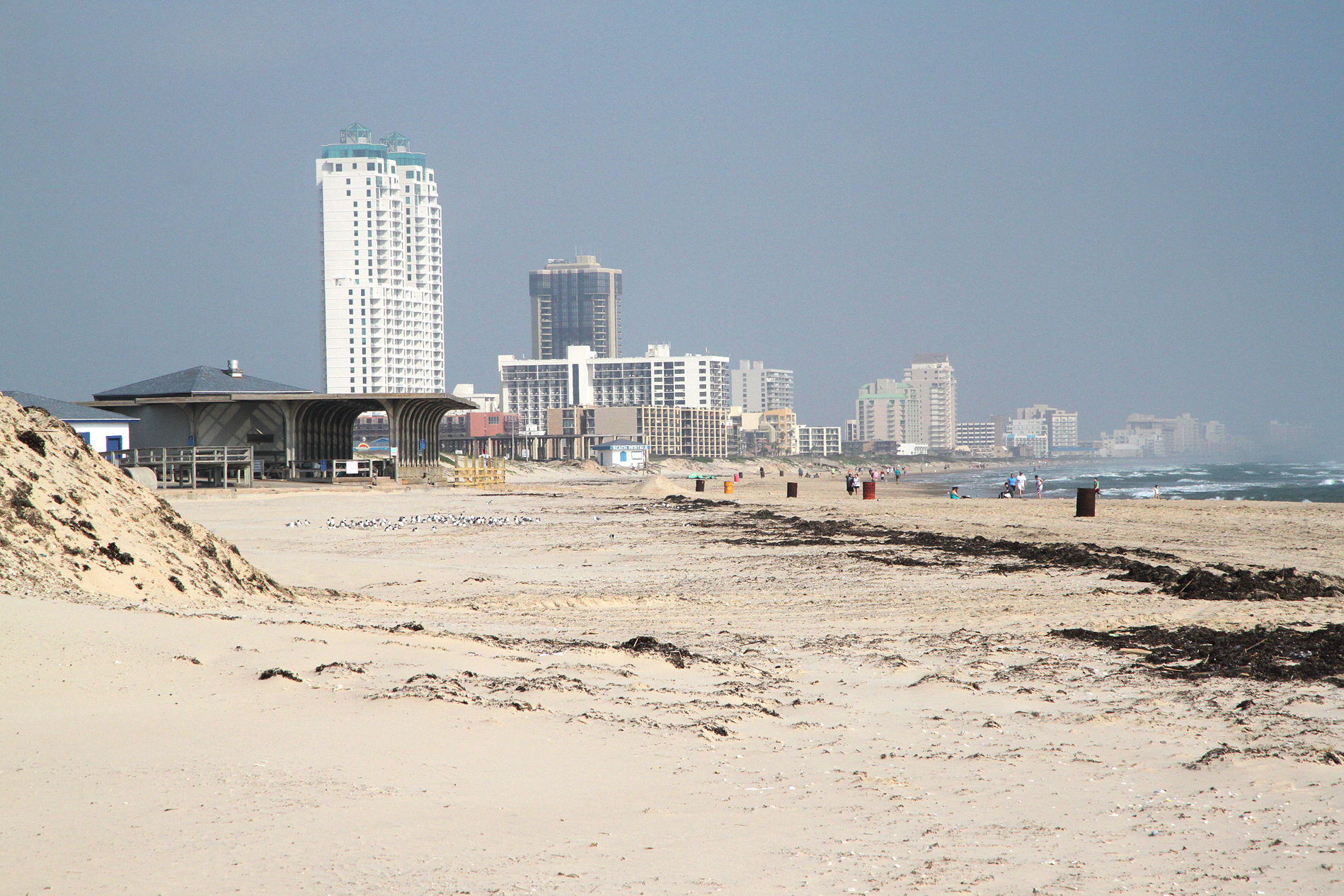
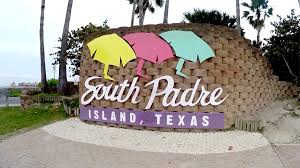
- Skyline Entrance sign Brazos Santiago Pass

- Logo
- Nickname: SPI
- Location in Texas
- Coordinates: 26°6′43″N 97°10′11″W
- Country: United States
- State: Texas
- County: Cameron

Area
  - Total: 3.74 sq mi (9.68 km^{2})
  - Land: 2.69 sq mi (6.96 km^{2})
  - Water: 1.05 sq mi (2.72 km^{2})
- Elevation: 6.6 ft (2 m)

Population (2020)
  - Total: 2,066
  - Density: 769/sq mi (297/km^{2})
- Time zone: UTC-6 (Central (CST))
  - Summer (DST): UTC-5 (CDT)
- ZIP code: 78597
- Area code: 956
- FIPS code: 48-69140
- GNIS feature ID: 1376223
- Website: myspi.org

South Padre Island is a resort town in Cameron County, Texas, United States. It is part of the Brownsville-Harlingen metropolitan area. The population was 2,066 at the 2020 census. The town is located on South Padre Island, a barrier island with the Laguna Madre situated to the leeward of the island and the Gulf of Mexico on the windward flank, along the Texas Gulf Coast. South Padre Island is named after José Nicolás Ballí (Padre Ballí), a Catholic priest and settler.

The island is only accessible via the Queen Isabella Causeway in Port Isabel and has become a popular tourist destination for both the spring, summer and for winter Texans. It features many activities such as ecotourism, fishing, snorkeling, kiteboarding, parasailing, surfing and horse back riding. SpaceX Starships are launched from the SpaceX Starbase facility and can be observed across the Brazos Santiago Pass in Boca Chica, Texas.

== History ==
The City of South Padre Island was officially incorporated in 1973 to better manage development and tourism. Growth was initially spurred by the construction of the original causeway in the early 1950s, which for the first time provided a permanent vehicular link between the island and the mainland. In 1974, this causeway was replaced by the Queen Isabella Causeway, a higher-capacity bridge that further boosted accessibility and economic development. Governed by a home-rule charter, the City of South Padre Island operates with a council-manager form of government, which outlines local governance rules and administrative procedures. South Padre Island became a popular spring break destination for college students and a resort destination for families. Many multistory resort hotels and condominiums have been erected along the coastline of the Gulf of Mexico.

== Industry ==
=== Tourism ===
Tourism is the primary industry of the City of South Padre Island economy. The city's economic objectives include reducing seasonal fluctuations and encouraging more year round economic activity. The city's 2022 comprehensive plan includes visitor activity statistics compiled from data attributed to the Office of the Texas Governor and AEC. The reported activities include beach and waterfront visits, shopping, wildlife viewing, water sports, and fishing. The percentages represent shares of visitor stays associated with each activity and are not mutually exclusive.

Visitor Activities

^{Source: City of South Padre Island, Comprehensive Plan, Table A10, p. 91}

Activity	Share of Stays
Beach/waterfront	63.7%
Shopping	30.0%
Visiting friends or relatives	22.3%
Nightlife	16.9%
Wildlife viewing	15.2%
Holiday celebrations	13.9%
Touring/sightseeing	11.7%
Water sports	10.2%
Parks	9.0%
Fishing	8.9%
Historic sites	7.1%
Biking	6.1%
Business	5.9%
Concerts, theater and dance	5.8%
Theme and water parks	4.8%
Zoos and aquariums	4.7%

== Geography ==
The town of South Padre Island is located at the southern end of South Padre Island, with the town limits extending from the northern edge of Isla Blanca Park in the south to the end of development north of Wharf Street in the north, a distance of 6 miles (10 km). The Queen Isabella Causeway is the only road access to the mainland; it leads 2.5 miles (4.0 km) across Laguna Madre to the city of Port Isabel. Brownsville is 25 miles (40 km) southwest of South Padre Island.

According to the United States Census Bureau, the town has a total area of 2.3 square miles (6.0 km^{2}), of which 2.1 square miles (5.5 km^{2}) is land and 0.2 square miles (0.5 km^{2}), or 8.44%, is water.

== Water clarity & quality ==
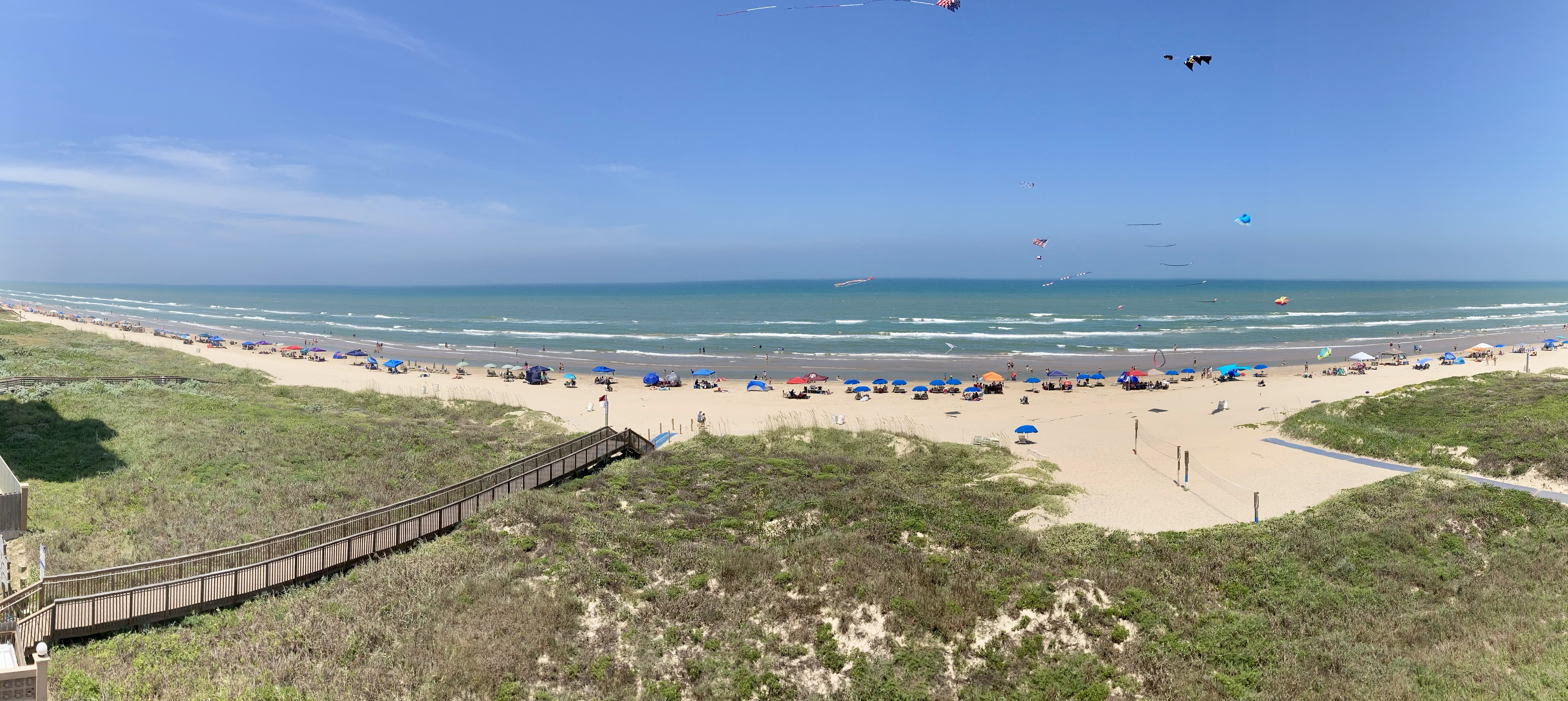
South Padre Island beach in June. Boardwalks provide access over the dunes.

South Padre Island is renowned for its clear, turquoise Gulf waters, a result of several favorable environmental factors. These include its distance from major sediment-laden river outlets such as the Mississippi Delta, calm weather periods that allow suspended particles to settle, and minimal nutrient runoff that discourages algae blooms. Together, these factors sustain consistently high visibility ideal for swimming and marine recreation.

Monitoring data from the Texas GLO Beach Watch program, which tests 21 sites on South Padre Island during peak season—consistently show that bacteria levels (Enterococcus) remain well within EPA safety standards. Advisories are rare, reflecting overall high coastal water quality.

Recent USGS hydrodynamic studies within the lower Laguna Madre adjacent to South Padre Island underscore the role of dense, prolific seagrass meadow, primarily Halodule wrightii (shoalgrass), in enhancing water clarity. These seagrass beds stabilize sediments, reducing turbidity and promoting optical transparency even in shallow lagoons.

== Climate ==
South Padre Island

Climate chart (precipitation, max. and min. temperature)
J	F	M	A	M	J	J	A	S	O	N	D
1.9 68 52	1.7 71 55	1.5 76 60	1.5 80 67	2.2 85 73	2.5 89 76	1.9 90 77	1.8 91 77	6.3 88 74	4 84 69	2.3 78 62	1.4 70 53
- █ Average max. and min. temperatures in °F
- █ Precipitation totals in inches
Metric conversion
J	F	M	A	M	J	J	A	S	O	N	D
48 20 11	44 22 13	38 24 16	38 27 19	56 29 23	63 32 24	49 32 25	44 33 25	160 31 23	102 29 21	58 26 17	36 21 12
- █ Average max. and min. temperatures in °C
- █ Precipitation totals in mm

South Padre Island experiences a warm humid subtropical climate (Köppen Cfa), transitioning into a hot semi-arid climate (BSh). The average high in January is 68 °F (20 °C) and the average low is 52 °F (11 °C). The average high in July is 90 °F (32 °C), and the average low is 77 °F (25 °C). The warm season is long, as average high temperatures are 80–89 °F (27–32 °C), and average low temperatures typically around 77 °F (25 °C). The region experiences relatively high dew point values, around 75 °F (24 °C) in the summer time, resulting in higher relative humidity values from June through September. Rainfall tends to be the highest during the summer and autumn months, usually ranging from 2 to 6 inches of rain each month. September has the highest rainfall, averaging 6.3 inches, followed by October, which averages 4 inches of rain. Due to the island being next to the ocean, temperatures above 100 °F (37.8 °C) are not common. South Padre Island went down to at least 25 °F (−4 °C) during the 2021 Texas freeze.

Due to the fact that South Padre Island is surrounded by water, precipitation is a little higher than cities farther inland in the Rio Grande Valley.

Climate data for South Padre Island, Texas
Month	Jan	Feb	Mar	Apr	May	Jun	Jul	Aug	Sep	Oct	Nov	Dec	Year
Record high °F (°C)	83 (28)	88 (31)	94 (34)	94 (34)	94 (34)	96 (36)	96 (36)	105 (41)	99 (37)	94 (34)	90 (32)	83 (28)	105 (41)
Mean daily maximum °F (°C)	67.9 (19.9)	70.1 (21.2)	73.9 (23.3)	78.6 (25.9)	83.8 (28.8)	88.0 (31.1)	88.9 (31.6)	89.7 (32.1)	88.6 (31.4)	84.4 (29.1)	78.9 (26.1)	71.4 (21.9)	80.4 (26.9)
Daily mean °F (°C)	60.9 (16.1)	63.0 (17.2)	67.7 (19.8)	73.3 (22.9)	78.9 (26.1)	83.0 (28.3)	83.3 (28.5)	84.3 (29.1)	82.9 (28.3)	78.5 (25.8)	72.1 (22.3)	63.4 (17.4)	74.3 (23.5)
Mean daily minimum °F (°C)	53.9 (12.2)	55.9 (13.3)	61.4 (16.3)	68.0 (20.0)	74.0 (23.3)	78.0 (25.6)	77.8 (25.4)	78.9 (26.1)	77.2 (25.1)	72.6 (22.6)	65.3 (18.5)	55.3 (12.9)	68.2 (20.1)
Record low °F (°C)	31 (−1)	25 (−4)	39 (4)	45 (7)	57 (14)	69 (21)	63 (17)	68 (20)	57 (14)	40 (4)	40 (4)	36 (2)	25 (−4)
Average precipitation inches (mm)	1.2 (30)	1.5 (38)	1.2 (30)	1.7 (43)	2.7 (69)	2.7 (69)	2.3 (58)	2.3 (58)	4.4 (110)	3.1 (79)	1.5 (38)	1.4 (36)	26 (658)

== Hurricane damage ==
=== Storms ===
- In September 1967, Hurricane Beulah caused considerable damage to much of the town of South Padre Island.
- On July 23, 2008, Hurricane Dolly made landfall on the island as a Category 1 Storm, causing extensive damage to the town.
- In September 2008 Hurricane Ike caused moderate damage to the island.
- In July 2010, the island received heavy rains from Hurricane Alex, but the storm left the island generally unscathed.
- On June 19, 2024, Tropical storm Alberto caused moderate damage and brought heavy rains and winds to the island.

== Demographics ==
Historical population
Census	Pop.	Note	%±
1980	791		—
1990	1,677		112.0%
2000	2,422		44.4%
2010	2,816		16.3%
2020	2,066		−26.6%
U.S. Decennial Census; 1850–1900 1910; 1920 1930 1940; 1950 1960 1970; 1980 1990 2000; 2010

=== 2020 census ===
South Padre Island racial composition (NH = Non-Hispanic) (Note: Note: the US Census treats Hispanic/Latino as an ethnic category. This table excludes Latinos from the racial categories and assigns them to a separate category. Hispanics/Latinos can be of any race.)
Race	Number	Percentage
White (NH)	1,322	63.99%
Black or African American (NH)	15	0.73%
Native American or Alaska Native (NH)	7	0.34%
Asian (NH)	64	3.1%
Some Other Race (NH)	5	0.24%
Mixed/Multi-Racial (NH)	44	2.13%
Hispanic or Latino	609	29.48%
Total	2,066	

As of the 2020 United States census, there were 2,066 people, 1,477 households, and 892 families residing in the town.

=== 2000 census ===
As of the census of 2000, there were 2,422 people, 1,222 households, and 662 families residing in the town. The population density was 1,335.9 inhabitants per square mile (515.8/km^{2}). There were 4,685 housing units at an average density of 2,584.1 per square mile (997.7/km^{2}). The racial makeup of the town was 94.59% White, 0.70% African American, 0.45% Native American, 0.21% Asian, 0.04% Pacific Islander, 2.77% from other races, and 1.24% from two or more races. 22.83% of the population is Hispanic or Latino of any race.

There were 1,211 households, out of which 15.4% had children under the age of 18 living with them, 47.2% were married couples living together, 4.2% had a female householder with no husband present, and 45.3% were non-families. 35.8% of all households were made up of individuals, and 7.8% had someone living alone who was 65 years of age or older. The average household size was 2.00 and the average family size was 2.54.

In the town, the population was spread out, with 12.9% under the age of 18, 6.2% from 18 to 24, 28.2% from 25 to 44, 34.2% from 45 to 64, and 18.4% who were 65 years of age or older. The median age was 47 years. For every 100 females, there were 113.8 males. For every 100 females age 18 and over, there were 115.9 males.

The median income for a household in the town was $45,417, and the median income for a family was $53,250. Males had a median income of $39,250 versus $30,028 for females. The per capita income for the town was $31,708. About 10.2% of families and 12.0% of the population were below the poverty line, including 11.1% of those under age 18 and 7.8% of those age 65 or over.

== Education ==
Children living in South Padre Island are zoned to schools in Point Isabel Independent School District. Children go to Garriga Elementary School (prek-5th), Port Isabel Junior High School (6–8), and Port Isabel High School (9–12). All of the schools are in Port Isabel.

In addition, South Padre Island residents may apply to schools in the South Texas Independent School District.

All of Cameron County is in the service area of Texas Southmost College.

== Government ==
South Padre Island is governed by a home-rule charter Home rule in the United States, the city operates with a council-manager form of government, which outlines local governance rules and administrative procedures.

The United States Postal Service operates the South Padre Island Post Office.

Coast Guard Station South Padre Island is a United States Coast Guard search and rescue station on South Padre Island.

== Transportation ==
Brownsville/South Padre Island International Airport in Brownsville and Valley International Airport in Harlingen serve the island.

South Padre Island is served by Island Metro (formerly known as The Wave), a free deviated fixed‑route shuttle system operating daily from 7 a.m. to 9 p.m., seven days a week. The service spans the length of the island and includes a route crossing the Queen Isabella Causeway to Port Isabel, with stops at beach accesses, hotels, restaurants, attractions, and the visitors center. Each shuttle is ADA accessible, includes a bicycle rack, and offers complimentary Wi‑Fi for passengers.

A new, second causeway bridge to South Padre Island has been designated as Texas State Highway 104, it will be situated 3 to 4 miles north of the existing Queen Isabella Causeway, just north of the South Padre Island Convention Center and approximately 3 to 4 miles north of State Highway 100. In 2023, the Texas Transportation Commission formally designated Texas State Highway 104 (SH 104) as the route for South Padre Island’s second causeway, providing a secondary access point along the island’s north side, approximately 3–4 miles north of the existing Queen Isabella Memorial Bridge. This proposed four‑lane span will stretch roughly 8 miles over water and about 11 miles in total between FM 106 and Park Road 100. The project is intended to improve hurricane evacuation, enhance emergency access, and relieve traffic on the only current gateway to the island. Environmental clearance is anticipated by fall 2026, with construction potentially beginning around 2029, pending partnerships between TxDOT, the Cameron County Regional Mobility Authority, and local stakeholders. Estimated cost ranges from $700 million to $1 billion.

== Gallery ==
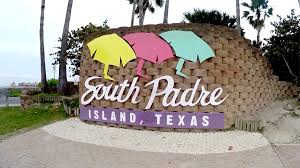
South Padre Island entrance sign with roundabout for photos.

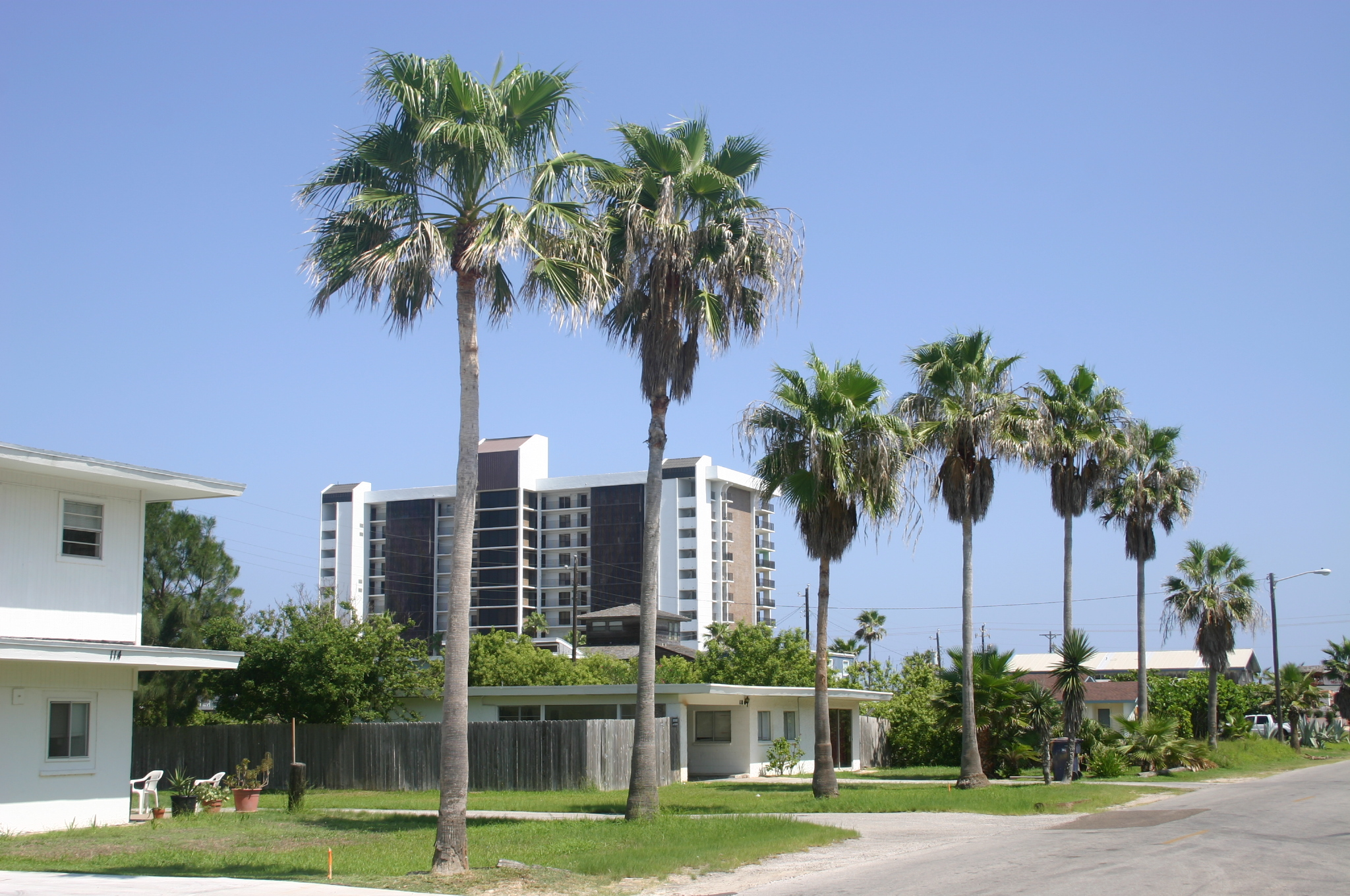
A street in SPI with residences and condominiums

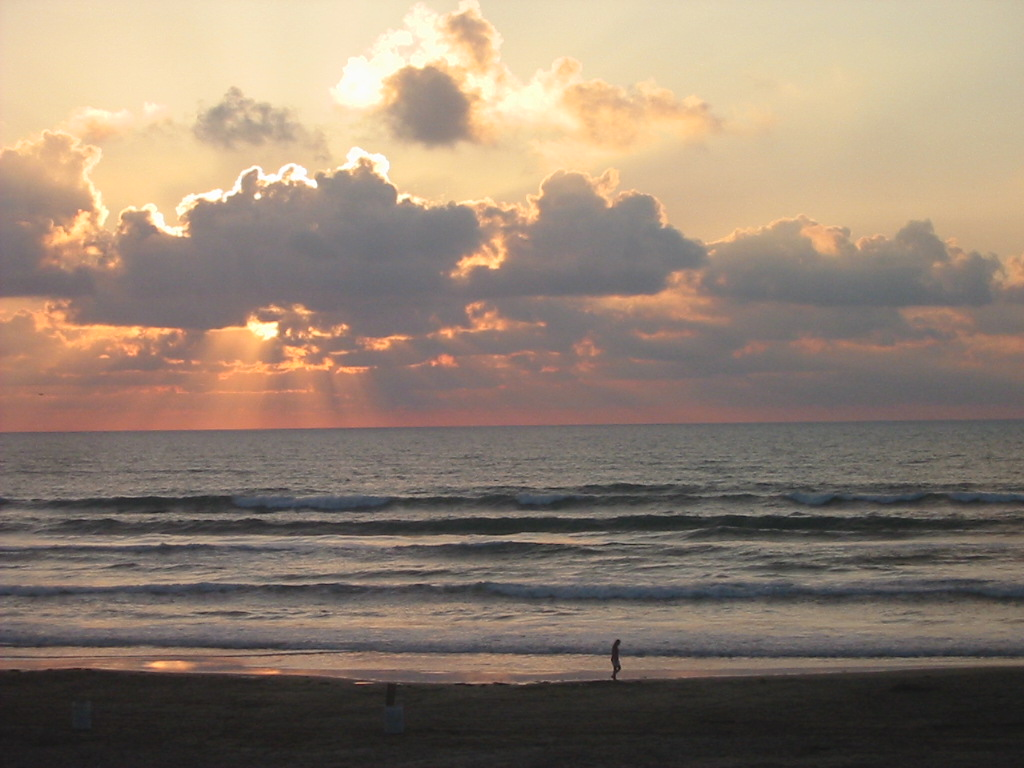
A person taking an early morning walk on the Gulf side of the island

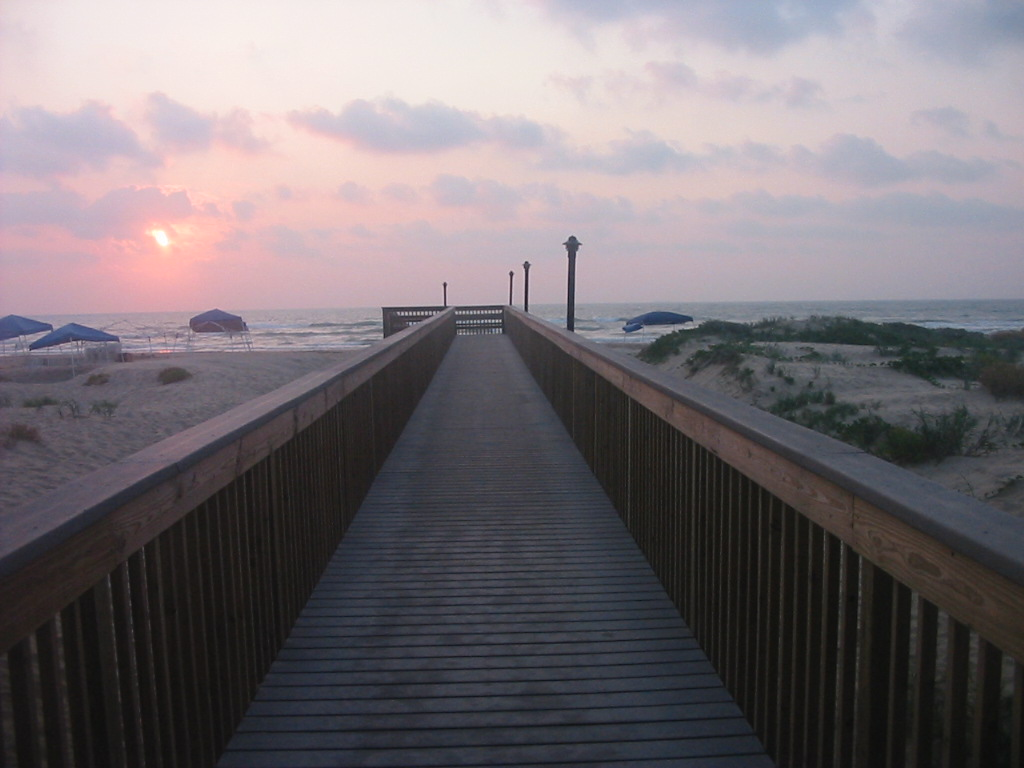
This walkway provides access to the beach from a condo.

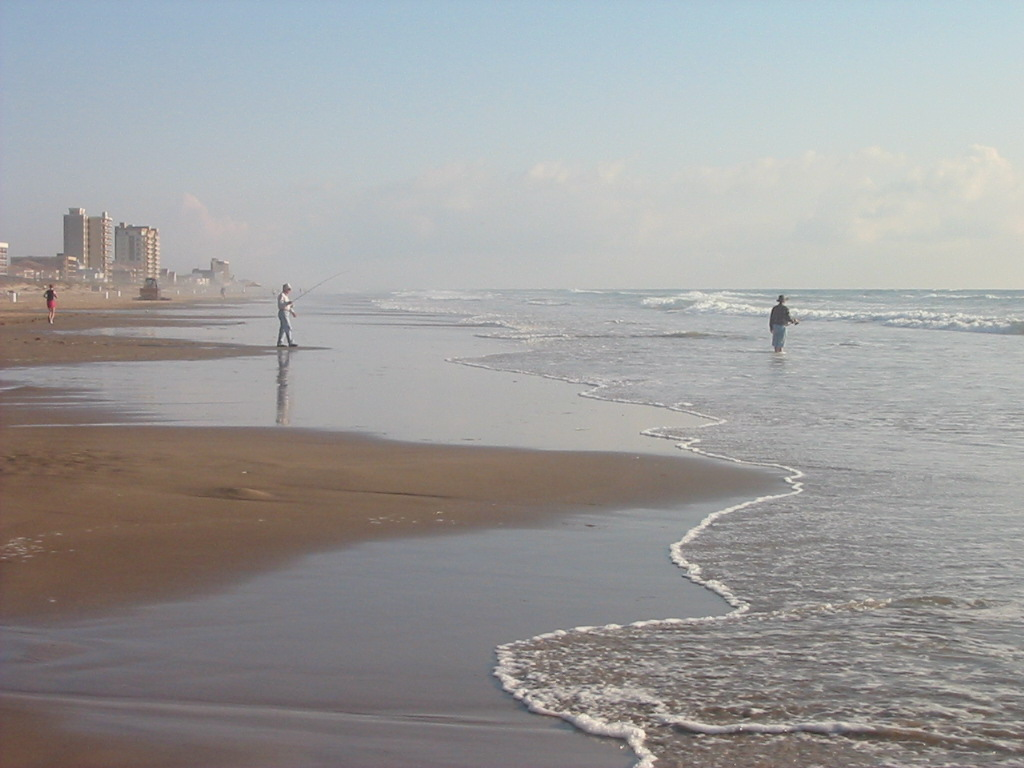
A beach in South Padre Island

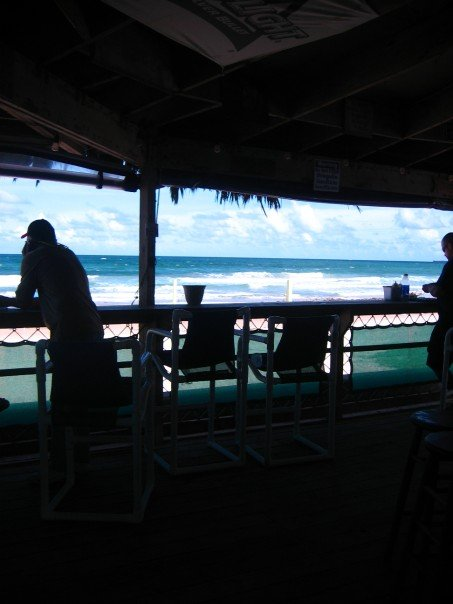
One of the smaller venues on the beach.

== See also ==
- Laguna Madre (United States)
- Queen Isabella Causeway
- Boca Chica (Texas)
- Brazos Santiago Pass (Texas)
- SpaceX Starbase
- Lower Rio Grande Valley
- Gulf of Mexico
