= Laguna Madre (United States) =

Hypersaline lagoon in Texas, US

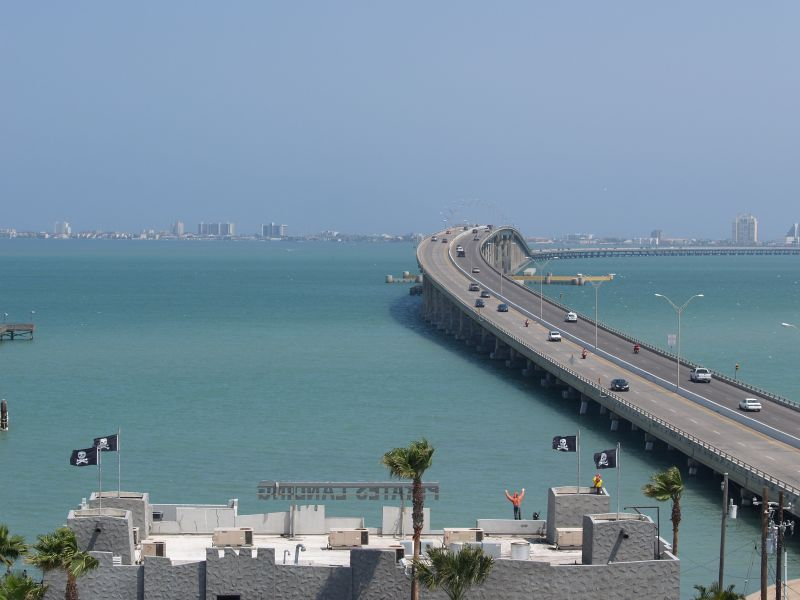
- View of the Queen Isabella Causeway over Lower Laguna Madre

- Location within Texas Location within the United States
- Location: South Texas Gulf Coast
- Coordinates: 26°45′N 97°25′W
- Ocean/sea sources: Gulf of Mexico
- Basin countries: United States
- Surface area: 280,910 acres (113,680 ha)
- Settlements: Corpus Christi, Laguna Vista, Port Isabel, Port Mansfield, South Padre Island

The Laguna Madre is a long, shallow, hypersaline lagoon along the western coast of the Gulf of Mexico, and is along the Nueces, Kenedy, Kleberg, Willacy and Cameron counties in Texas, United States, and is enclosed by Padre Island to the east. It is one of seven major estuaries along the Gulf Coast of Texas. The roughly 20-mile (32 km) long Saltillo Flats land bridge divides it into Upper and Lower lagoons joined by the Intracoastal Waterway, which has been dredged through the lagoon. Cumulatively, Laguna Madre is approximately 130 miles (210 km) long, the length of Padre Island in the US. The main extensions include Baffin Bay in Upper Laguna Madre, Red Fish Bay just below the Saltillo Flats, and South Bay near the Mexican border. As a natural ecological unit, the Laguna Madre of the United States is the northern half of the ecosystem as a whole, which extends into Tamaulipas, Mexico approximately 144 miles (232 km) south of the US border, to the vicinity of the Rio Soto La Marina and the town of La Pesca, extending approximately 275 miles (443 km) through USA and Mexico in total.

The lagoon's ecosystem is protected by the Laguna Atascosa National Wildlife Refuge and the Padre Island National Seashore, as well as the privately owned King Ranch. The human history predates the formation of the Laguna Madre, and settlements have been established at Port Isabel and Port Mansfield on the lagoon's shores.

The Laguna Madre is the gap between the mainland of Texas and the barrier islands to it’s east, with the mainland connected by the Queen Isabella Memorial Bridge, which is part of Texas Park Road 100 and is located between Port Isabel and South Padre Island, Texas.

== History ==
Laguna Madre was formed about 3,000 years ago, after the stabilization of the sea level on the Texas Coast, culminating in the rise of Padre Island. The Baffin Bay extension is considerably older than Laguna Madre, and formed as a river valley during the Pleistocene epoch, over 12,000 years ago. Early peoples obtained oysters from the bay, which were eliminated due to changes in salinity after the full formation of Laguna Madre. The first people to encounter the new lagoon were most likely the nomadic Karankawa and Coahuiltecan Indians. The Spanish explorer Alonso Álvarez de Pineda is believed to be the first European to come in contact with Laguna Madre in the early 16th century. Pineda is widely credited with giving it the name, which is Spanish for "mother lagoon", although there is no direct source for this.

Several land grants were handed out by the Spanish government for ranching near the lagoon. The first was believed to have been given to José Nicolás Cabazos in 1792, which included 500,000 acres (2,000 km^{2}) in the area south of Baffin Bay to the Rio Grande. Cabazos stocked the land with 900 cattle. American ranching settlements developed following the Mexican War, including the King Ranch, which was established in 1847 by Richard King. The area near present-day Port Isabel was used as a resort for Spaniards after watersellers came ashore in the late 18th century looking for freshwater supplies. A settlement known as Point Isabel was established at the location in the 1830s, and in 1853, the Point Isabel Lighthouse was constructed to overlook the lagoon. The city was named Port Isabel in 1928, and in 1954, the Queen Isabella Causeway, the longest bridge in Texas, was constructed across Laguna Madre to South Padre Island. A newer bridge was built in 1974, but part of it collapsed on September 15, 2001, after being hit by a barge, causing eight people to plunge to their deaths and significantly hindering the economy of South Texas. It was rebuilt and reopened in November of that year. Port Isabel had 4,865 residents during the 2000 census. To the north, Port Mansfield was established in 1950, at the old fishing community of Red Fish Landing. It was named after United States Congressman Joseph J. Mansfield (D-TX), who introduced the bill that extended the Intracoastal Waterway from Corpus Christi to Brownsville in the 1940s. The Port Mansfield Ship Channel was dredged in 1957 across Padre Island and redredged in 1962 after work was done to improve the jetties. The cut allows an influx of seawater into the Lower Laguna Madre to improve the fishing and shipping industry of Port Mansfield. The community had 415 residents in 2000.

== Features ==
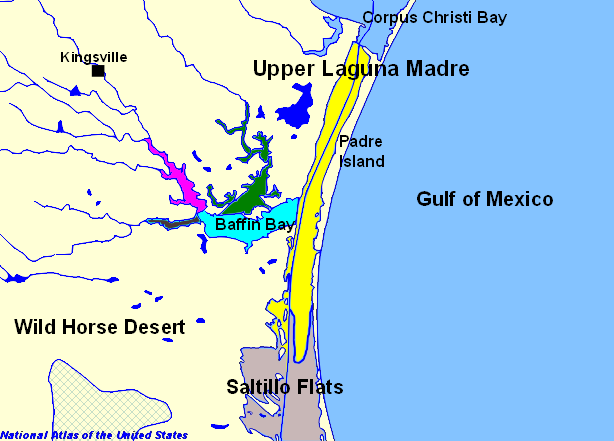
Alazan Bay (dark green), Baffin Bay (light blue), Cayo del Grullo (pink), Upper Laguna Madre (yellow), Laguna Salada (dark brown, directly to the left of Baffin Bay)

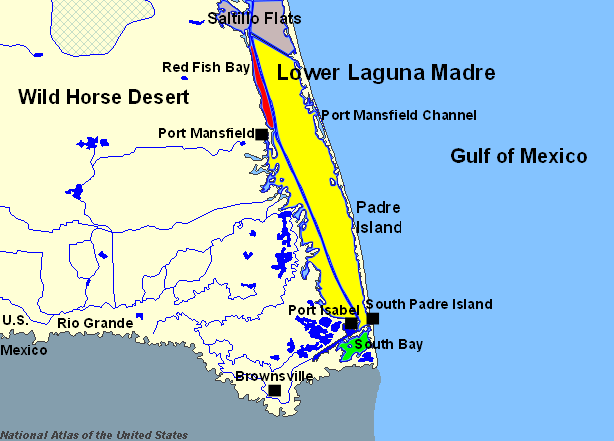
Lower Laguna Madre (yellow), Red Fish Bay (red), South Bay (light green)

Laguna Madre is found between the mainland of South Texas and Padre Island. At this location between the Nueces River and the Rio Grande, the climate is dry and it is sometimes referred to as the Wild Horse Desert. The western shore, a large part of which is included in the King Ranch, is usually marked by sand dunes, yucca, prickly pear, century plants and an occasional oak tree bent by the wind. The lagoon is split by a 20-mile (32 km) expanse of sand flats, named the Saltillo Flats, which are located about 40 miles (64 km) from the northern extreme near the John F. Kennedy Memorial Causeway in Corpus Christi. This part of the lagoon is known as the Upper Laguna Madre and includes the extension of Baffin Bay near Kingsville, and Bird Island on the eastern Padre Island shore, northeast of the opening of Baffin Bay. The Lower Laguna Madre includes the area south of the Saltillo Flats to the extension of South Bay near Port Isabel, and is crossed by the Queen Isabella Causeway. Included in the Lower Laguna Madre is Red Fish Bay, which is found along the shoreline of the King Ranch, south to Port Mansfield. Together with its extensions, the lagoon forms one of seven major estuaries along the Gulf Coast of Texas.

The lagoon is shallow and narrow, averaging only 3.6 feet (1.1 m) in depth and 4 miles (6.4 km) to 6 miles (9.7 km) in width. The depth is only 0.66 feet (20 cm) to 1.1 feet (34 cm) in the areas not dredged to form the 12-foot (3.7 m) deep, 138-foot (42 m) wide Gulf Intracoastal Waterway, which runs the bay's length and joins the upper and lower stretches. Two types of hard reef are found in the lagoon bed and on the shoreline, including beach rock reefs (shell and sand bound by calcium carbonate cement) common south of Baffin Bay due to the occasional shifts in the Laguna Madre coastal shoreline; and Serpulid reefs, common in Baffin Bay, and elsewhere in the system, formed between 300 and 3,000 years ago by the annelid's calcareous tubes.

=== Hypersalinity ===
Laguna Madre has a salinity of 36 parts per thousand (ppt), which is above the seawater average of 35 ppt. Because of the high salinity, it holds the distinction as one of the Earth's six hypersaline lagoons/bays, the others being Sivash in Ukraine, Laguna Ojo de Liebre on the west coast of Baja California, Spencer Gulf and Shark Bay in Australia, and the Laguna Madre of Tamaulipas, which is sometimes grouped with the Laguna Madre of Texas as one system.

The reasons for the lagoon's hypersalinity include its isolation from other bodies of water, the lack of a significant river source, and a high rate of evaporation caused by its shallowness and dry climate. Its salinity was even greater before the Port Mansfield Gulf Channel was dredged on Padre Island, which allowed a larger amount of seawater exchange. However, very little water exchange occurs at all; every second only 25 cubic metres (6,600 US gal) of water flows into the lagoon. Rainwater from tropical storms and hurricanes is the only significant fresh water the bay receives. The salinity is greatest in the Lower Laguna Madre, where it averages around 45 ppt.

== Ecosystem ==
The Laguna Madre is one of the most important and unspoiled lagoon ecosystems in Texas. It is also one of the most protected in the United States; 75% of its shores are protected by the Laguna Atascosa National Wildlife Refuge to the west and the Padre Island National Seashore on the east. Fish, shrimp and crab, which feed the bird populations, depend on the lagoon and its plentiful beds of seagrass for survival. The seagrass of Laguna Madre accounts for 80% of all seagrass found off the Texas Coast; however, it is threatened by brown tides caused by poor circulation and dredging. An influx of seawater can sometimes replace the vital seagrass with oyster beds.

=== Fish ===
Laguna Madre is home to more finfish than anywhere else on the Texas coast, with such species as blue catfish, hardhead catfish, Atlantic croaker, black drum, red drum, southern flounder, alligator gar, houndfish, crevalle jack, southern kingfish, ladyfish, Atlantic midshipman, mojarras, striped mullet, pinfish, Florida pompano, smooth butterfly ray, spotted seatrout, blacktip shark, sheepshead, bigmouth sleeper, gray snapper, common snook, southern stargazer, southern stingray and tripletail.

=== Birds ===
Many fowl migrate and live around the lagoon including 75% of all redhead ducks. Other birds in the area include the peregrine falcon, piping plover, roseate spoonbill, long-billed curlew, crane, egret and the brown pelican. Sea turtles and dolphins can be found in the bay, while cattle, white-tailed deer, nilgai and bobcats can sometimes be seen near the shore.

In Laguna Madre, Bird Island Basin is home to a wide variety of birds when wet, including black-necked stilts, roseate spoonbills, great egrets, American white ibis, and many others.

== Industry ==
The ports of Port Isabel and Port Mansfield rely on the fishing and shrimping industries. In the 1960s, Port Isabel averaged a catch of 3,600,000 tonnes (3,500,000 long tons; 4,000,000 short tons) of shrimp annually, which accounted for 65% of the entire production in Texas. In Port Mansfield, the fishing industry has greatly expanded with the opening of the Port Mansfield Channel, allowing a steady accumulation of redfish, brown shrimp, and flounder. Because of the bay's environmental protections, very few manufacturing plants have been constructed in the area. Following an environmental campaign, the Valero Energy Corporation constructed an oil and gas pipeline from Corpus Christi to the Rio Grande Valley to decrease the shipment of oil and gas along the Intracoastal Waterway, greatly diminishing the chance of a spill. Activists have likewise railed against a proposed wind turbine farm off Baffin Bay, due to the potential harm to the scenic shores and the bird populations.

The tourism industry is also a mainstay for communities on the lagoon. Beach-goers must pass the Laguna Madre to reach the prime beaching destination at both North and South Padre Islands. Fishing has drawn tourists to Port Isabel, where the Texas International Fishing Tournament has been held since 1934. Visitors also flock to Bird Island off the western coast of Padre Island, for windsurfing, kayaking, and other water sports. The SpaceX launch site and company town of Starbase is located at the extreme south end on South Bay.
