= Coast Guard Station South Padre Island =

US Coast Guard station in Texas

Coordinates: 26.073°N 97.166°W

- Part of Eighth District
- South Padre Island, Texas
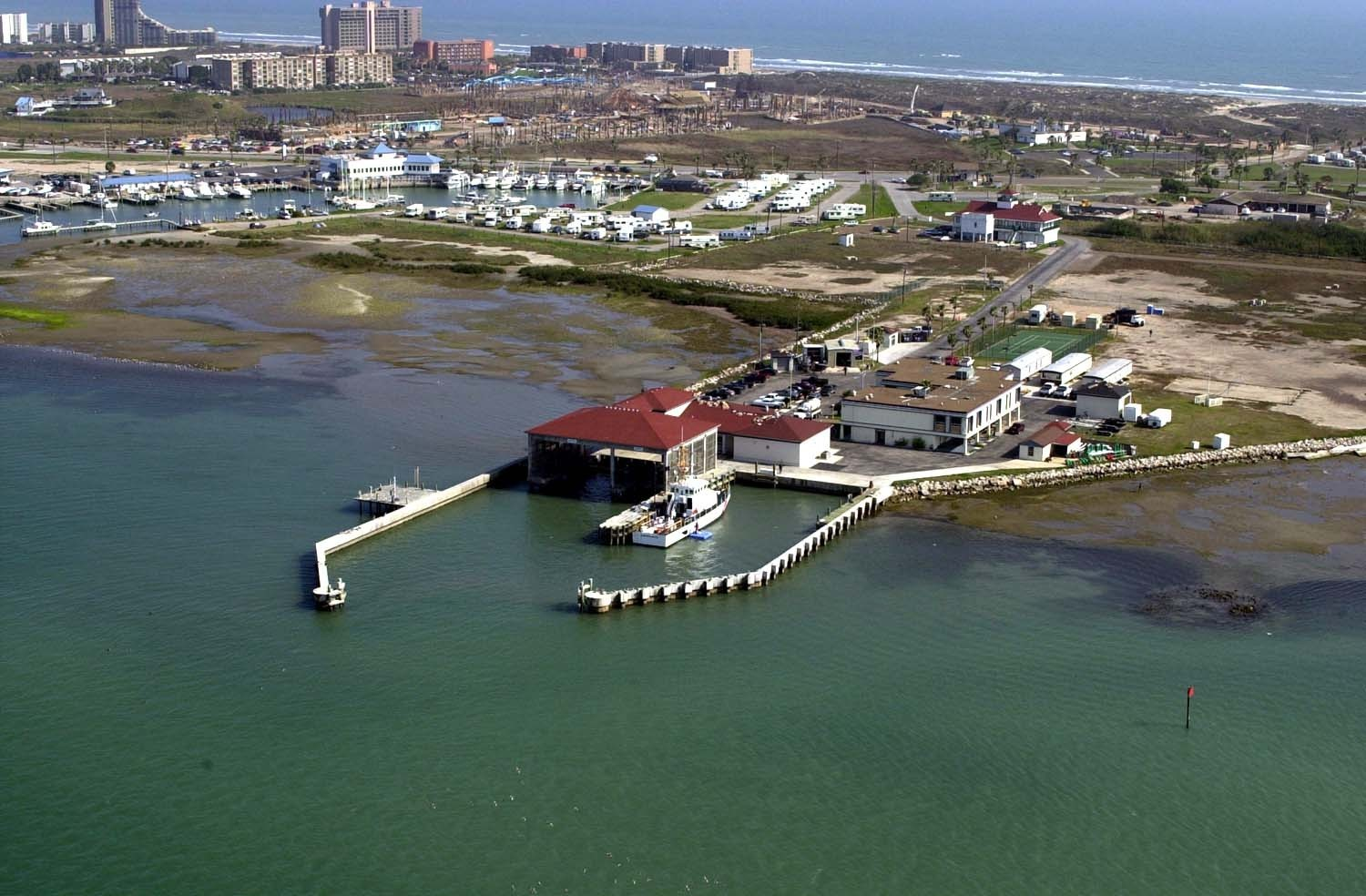

Site information
- Type: Coast Guard Station
- Owner: United States Coast Guard
- Controlled by: USCG Sector Corpus Christi

Site history
- In use: 1974 – present

United States Coast Guard Station South Padre Island is a large United States Coast Guard station six miles (9.7 km) north of the Mexico–United States border in South Padre Island, Texas. The station is home to the Aids to Navigation Team (ANT) South Padre Island and the cutter USCGC Alligator (WPB-87372). It focuses on search and rescue and maritime law enforcement. It belongs to the United States Coast Guard 8th District Sector Corpus Christi.

== History ==
The Coast Guard has a long presence on South Padre Island. The original station, named Brazos Santiago, was established in 1881. A lifesaving station was established in 1918 on Boca Chica Beach named Station Brazos. A new location was opened in 1923 on the southern end of South Padre Island to a building that was used for 50 years.

The current station was constructed in 1974, which houses the main office spaces and duty crew berthing. In 1998 the station was named Coast Guard Station South Padre Island reflecting on the island geographic location of the station.
