= Queen Isabella Memorial Bridge =

Bridge in Texas

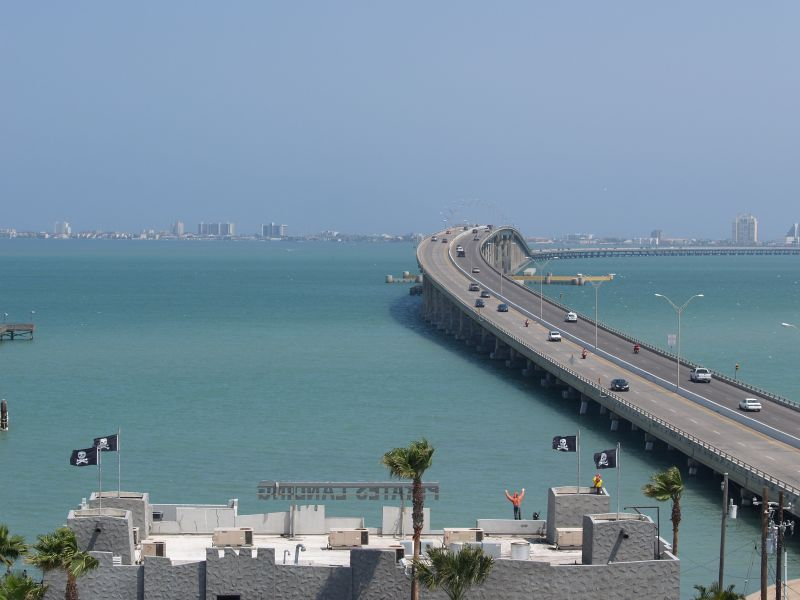
- Queen Isabella Causeway before the collapse
- Coordinates: 26°5′11″N 97°11′18″W
- Carries: 4 lanes of PR 100
- Crosses: Laguna Madre; Gulf Intracoastal Waterway
- Other name(s): Queen Isabella Causeway

Characteristics
- Design: Concrete pier-and-beam, steel cantilever beam main span
- Total length: 2.37 miles (3.81 km)
- Width: 63.3 feet (19.3 m)
- Height: 80 feet (24 m)

History
- Construction cost: $12 million
- Opened: 1974

The Queen Isabella Memorial Bridge, formerly the Queen Isabella Causeway, is a concrete pier-and-beam bridge with a steel cantilever main beam span connecting Port Isabel to South Padre Island in southern Cameron County, Texas. The bridge sustains the continuation of Texas Park Road 100 and is the only road connecting South Padre Island to mainland Texas. Stretching 2.37 miles (3.81 km) across the Laguna Madre, the causeway is the second-longest bridge in Texas, after the Fred Hartman Bridge over the Houston Ship Channel. It is named after Queen Isabella of Castile.

The current bridge opened in 1974, replacing a previous bridge that had also been named Queen Isabella Causeway. A central section of the earlier causeway was removed and renamed the Queen Isabella State Fishing Pier. The bridge was severely damaged after being struck by four barges in 2001; eight people were killed in the accident. It reopened four months later after repairs and installation of a warning system, and was subsequently renamed to the Queen Isabella Memorial Bridge in memory of the victims.

== Incidents ==
=== 1996 plane crash ===
On August 13, 1996, at 6:22 p.m., while maneuvering near Port Isabel, a Cessna TR182 collided with the causeway, killing both the pilot-in-command and the pilot-rated passenger. Witnesses and local authorities reported that the airplane was observed flying a pass from north to south under the causeway. It then turned and approached the bridge toward the north for another pass, but struck a concrete bridge pylon and column and descended uncontrolled into the water. Witnesses recalled an explosion and black smoke as the airplane struck the bridge. Portions of the airplane's vertical and horizontal stabilizers were found projecting from the bridge column at about 8 feet (2.4 m) above the waterline. Texas Department of Public Safety divers located the fuselage submerged on the west side of the column in approximately 8 to 10 feet (2.4 to 3.0 m) of water. The postmortem toxicology report indicated that the pilot-in-command tested positive for cocaine and a concentration of 143 mg/dl ethanol in the blood.

=== 2001 causeway collapse ===
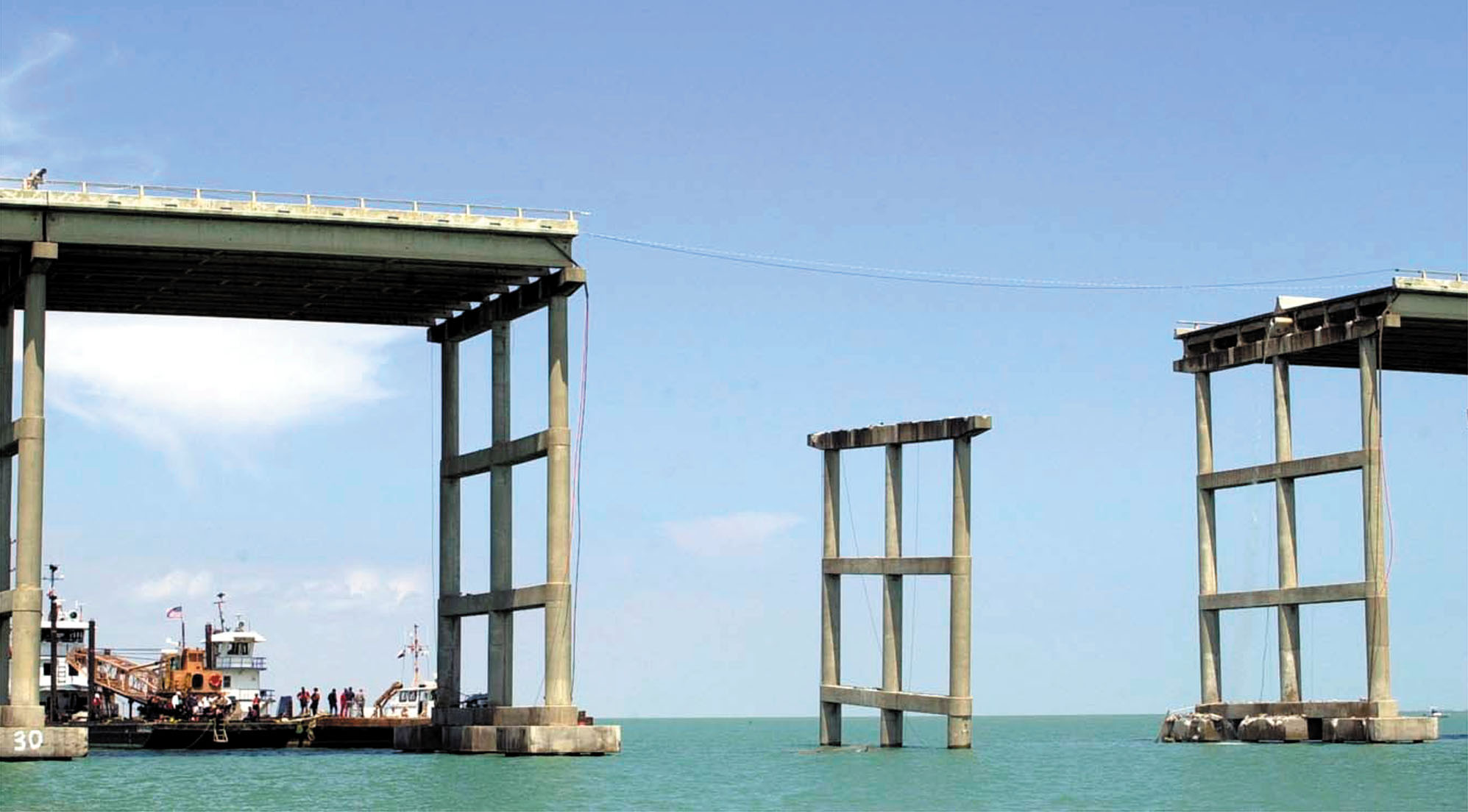
The damaged section of the Queen Isabella Causeway

In the early morning of September 15, 2001, four loaded barges crashed into one of the Queen Isabella Causeway's support columns traveling at 0.2 miles per hour (0.32 km/h). The collision caused two 80-foot (24 m) spans to fall into the water, leaving a 160-foot (49 m) gap in the roadway. The collapsed sections were next to the highest point of the causeway, making it difficult for approaching drivers to notice. Eight people were killed as their cars fell 85 feet (26 m) into the water. Five vehicles were recovered from the water along with three survivors.

The collapse had a significant economic impact on the region since the causeway is the only road connecting the island to the mainland. The bridge also carried electricity lines and fresh water to the island. State officials brought in ferries to temporarily carry cars across the Laguna Madre. News and discussion of the collapse was mostly confined to local and regional sources due to the September 11, 2001 attacks four days earlier.

In addition to the three bridge sections that toppled in the accident, two adjacent sections were also replaced due to structural damage. The causeway was reopened on November 21, 2001. Several safety features were added to the structure. The support columns were reinforced, and a $900,000 fiber optic collapse warning system was installed.

Two years after the reopening, the causeway was renamed to the Queen Isabella Memorial Bridge to honor the victims of the accident.

A report from the United States Coast Guard assigned blame to the captain of the barges' tow boat.

== See also ==
- I-40 bridge disaster – a similar collapse in 2002
- Francis Scott Key Bridge collapse – a similar collapse in 2024
