= Port Isabel Detention Center =

Port Isabel Service Processing Center
- Interactive map of Port Isabel Service Processing Center
- Location: 27991 Buena Vista Blvd. Los Fresnos, TX, 78566; 26°09′21″N 97°20′14″W
- Status: Open 1950 (Addition: 2007)
- Capacity: approx. 1,200
- Opened: 1950; 76 years ago
- Managed by: Ahtna Support and Training Services

Port Isabel, Texas
- Detention Center
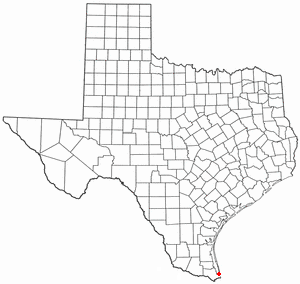
- Location of Port Isabel, Texas

The Port Isabel Service Processing Center near Los Fresnos, Texas holds detainees of United States Immigration and Customs Enforcement (ICE), whose immigration status or citizenship has not been officially determined or who are awaiting repatriation. It is operated by Ahtna Support and Training Services.

== History ==
Port Isabel was built in 1950 and added a new building in 2007. The facility holds about 1,200 detainees, and intake approximately 9,500 detainees per year. Unarmed guards at Port Isabel receive 67 hours of training and Armed guards get an extra eight hours of firearms instruction. Detainees get two hot meals and one cold meal a day, and all outgoing mail is photocopied.

== Controversies ==
On April 22, 2009, some detainees began a hunger strike, alleging violations of due process, inadequate access to medical care and legal resources, and various other abuses.

On February 10, 2010, detainees went on a series of staggered hunger strikes in protest of inhumane conditions and advocating for less transfers. Detainees feared violence and being placed in isolation for the hunger strike. It was reported as the third hunger strike in less than a year. A Department of Homeland Security 2010 report confirms the need to properly staff the facilities medical care and was not addressing detainees sick requests in a timely manner.

In July 2010 Tony Hefner, a former guard at Port Isabel, published a memoir about the corruption and human rights abuses he witnessed in the 1980s.

In 2015, the U.S. Commission on Civil Rights issued a report on the treatment of detainees held in immigration detention centers. The report found Port Isabel to be one of the facilities in the U.S. to be violating the Fifth Amendment rights of immigrants due to the detention conditions being punitive in nature, such as punishing people without the due process protections afforded in criminal proceedings.

== Family separation ==
Following the Trump Administration's "zero tolerance" family separation policy in April 2018, the Port Isabel Detention Center was designated ICE's primary family reunification and removal center for adults in their custody. Even though the facility is designated a reunification center, children of detainees are housed at "off-site" locations, making it hard to know how many families have been reunified through ICE. Several members of Congress toured the facility in June and met with 10 women who had been separated from their children. Some of them did not know where their children had been transferred to and none had been able to speak with a lawyer. One women said that she was told that her child would be put up for adoption. Rhode Island Representative David Cicilline said the women were uncontrollably sobbing.

The National Congress of American Indians (NCAI) decried the family separation policy calling it "simply immoral and harkens back to a dark period for many Native American families."
