= Port Isabel, Texas =

- City
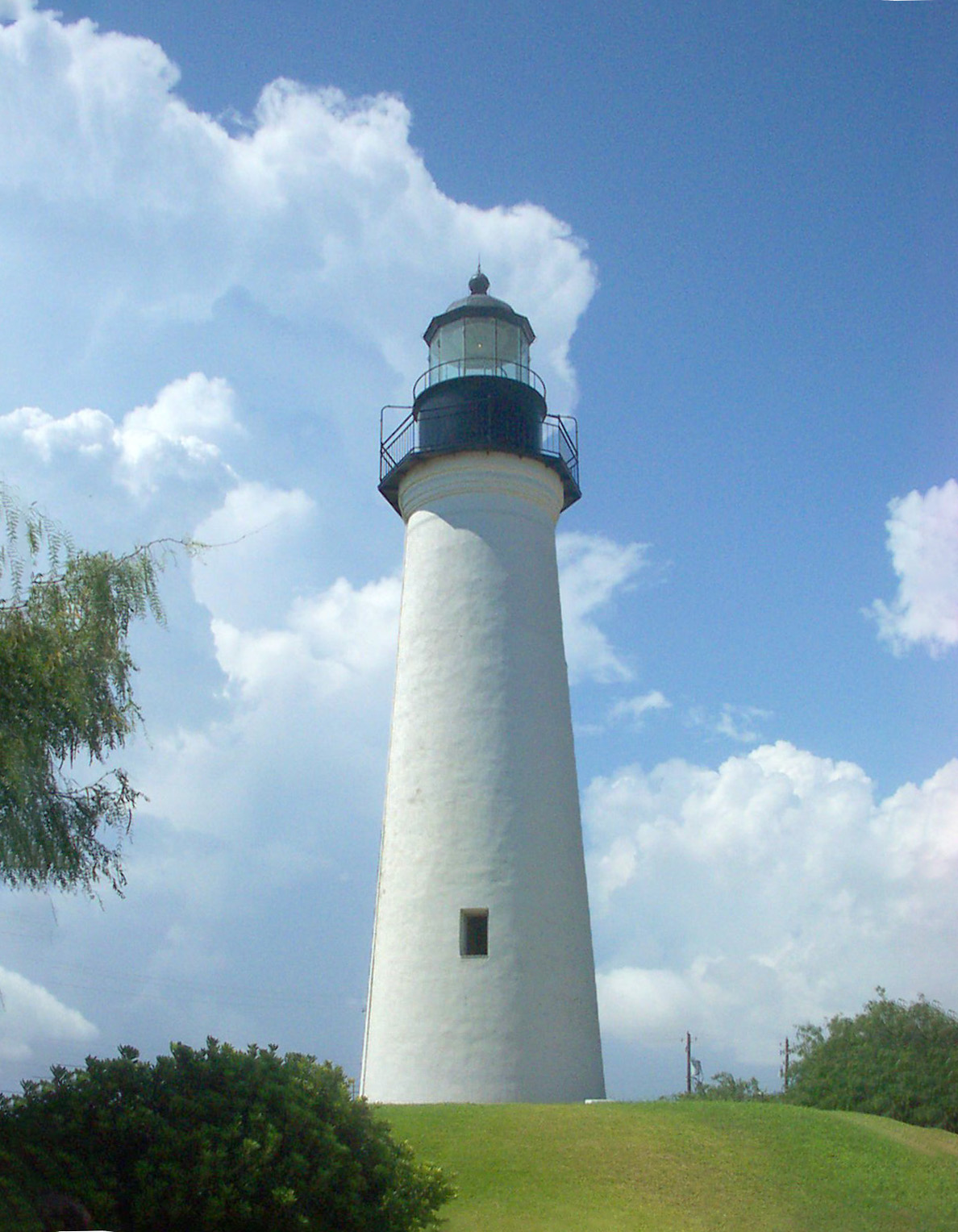
- Port Isabel Lighthouse

- Location of Port Isabel, Texas
- Coordinates: 26°4′25″N 97°12′48″W
- Country: United States
- State: Texas
- County: Cameron

Area
  - Total: 13.80 sq mi (35.73 km^{2})
  - Land: 6.79 sq mi (17.58 km^{2})
  - Water: 7.01 sq mi (18.15 km^{2})
- Elevation: 6.6 ft (2 m)

Population (2020)
  - Total: 5,028
  - Density: 740.8/sq mi (286.0/km^{2})
- Time zone: UTC-6 (Central (CST))
  - Summer (DST): UTC-5 (CDT)
- ZIP codes: 78578, 78597
- Area code: 956
- FIPS code: 48-58892
- GNIS feature ID: 1375530
- Website: myportisabel.com

Port Isabel is a city in Cameron County, Texas, United States. It is part of the Brownsville–Harlingen–Raymondville and the Matamoros–Brownsville metropolitan areas. The population was 5,028 at the 2020 census.

The city's name is given to the Port Isabel Detention Center, 12 miles (19 km) to the northwest next to Port Isabel-Cameron County Airport.

== History ==
Port Isabel is named after Queen Isabella of Spain, though it was originally known by Spanish colonial settlers as El Frontón (referring to a wall-like cliff extending into the bay). Over time, the area became known as La Punta de Isabela or Point Isabel derived from the Potrero de Santa Isabela land grant. When it was incorporated as a city in 1928, the name was formally updated to Port Isabel

Established as a town after the Mexican War of Independence, Port Isabel became an important cotton-exporting port before the American Civil War. The harbor, town and lighthouse all were fought over and exchanged hands during the Civil War.

In September 1967, Hurricane Beulah caused extensive damage to much of the city. On July 23, 2008 Hurricane Dolly, a category 2 storm, also caused extensive damage to the city.

== Geography ==
Port Isabel is located in eastern Cameron County at 26°4'25" North, 97°12'48" West (26.073675, –97.213234), on the western side of the south end of Laguna Madre, an estuary of the Gulf of Mexico. The Queen Isabella Causeway crosses Laguna Madre to South Padre Island on the Gulf shore. To the southwest it is 23 miles (37 km) to Brownsville, the Cameron County seat.

According to the United States Census Bureau, Port Isabel has a total area of 13.7 square miles (35.4 km^{2}), of which 6.7 square miles (17.4 km^{2}) is land and 6.9 square miles (18.0 km^{2}), or 50.94%, is water.

== Demographics ==
=== 2020 census ===
As of the 2020 census, Port Isabel had a population of 5,028 and 1,432 families residing in the city. The median age was 39.3 years; 26.4% of residents were under the age of 18 and 18.2% of residents were 65 years of age or older. For every 100 females there were 98.0 males, and for every 100 females age 18 and over there were 97.0 males age 18 and over.

99.5% of residents lived in urban areas, while 0.5% lived in rural areas.

There were 1,798 households in Port Isabel, of which 35.9% had children under the age of 18 living in them. Of all households, 43.0% were married-couple households, 19.4% were households with a male householder and no spouse or partner present, and 30.3% were households with a female householder and no spouse or partner present. About 25.0% of all households were made up of individuals and 12.0% had someone living alone who was 65 years of age or older.

There were 2,350 housing units, of which 23.5% were vacant. The homeowner vacancy rate was 2.6% and the rental vacancy rate was 8.4%.

Racial composition as of the 2020 census
Race	Number	Percent
White	2,338	46.5%
Black or African American	18	0.4%
American Indian and Alaska Native	84	1.7%
Asian	22	0.4%
Native Hawaiian and Other Pacific Islander	5	0.1%
Some other race	864	17.2%
Two or more races	1,697	33.8%
Hispanic or Latino (of any race)	4,028	80.1%

=== 2000 census ===
As of the census of 2000, there were 4,965 people, 1,649 households, and 1,225 families residing in the city. The population density was 2,215.5 inhabitants per square mile (855.4/km^{2}). There were 2,055 housing units at an average density of 935.8 per square mile (361.3/km^{2}). The racial makeup of the city was 79.67% White, 1.03% African American, 0.33% Native American, 0.25% Asian, 0.10% Pacific Islander, 15.54% from other races, and 3.08% from two or more races. 74.39% of the population were Hispanic or Latino of any race.

There were 1,649 households, out of which 36.0% had children under the age of 18 living with them, 53.1% were married couples living together, 16.6% had a female householder with no husband present, and 25.7% were non-families. 22.1% of all households were made up of individuals, and 7.8% had someone living alone who was 65 years of age or older. The average household size was 2.95 and the average family size was 3.46.

In the city, the population was spread out, with 30.4% under the age of 18, 9.9% from 18 to 24, 25.6% from 25 to 44, 21.8% from 45 to 64, and 12.2% who were 65 years of age or older. The median age was 32 years. For every 100 females, there were 94.1 males. For every 100 females age 18 and over, there were 93.5 males.

The median income for a household in the city was $25,323, and the median income for a family was $26,077. Males had a median income of $17,105 versus $16,316 for females. The per capita income for the city was $11,239. 27.3% of the population and 21.7% of families were below the poverty line. 34.7% of those under the age of 18 and 14.3% of those 65 and older were living below the poverty line.

== Government and infrastructure ==
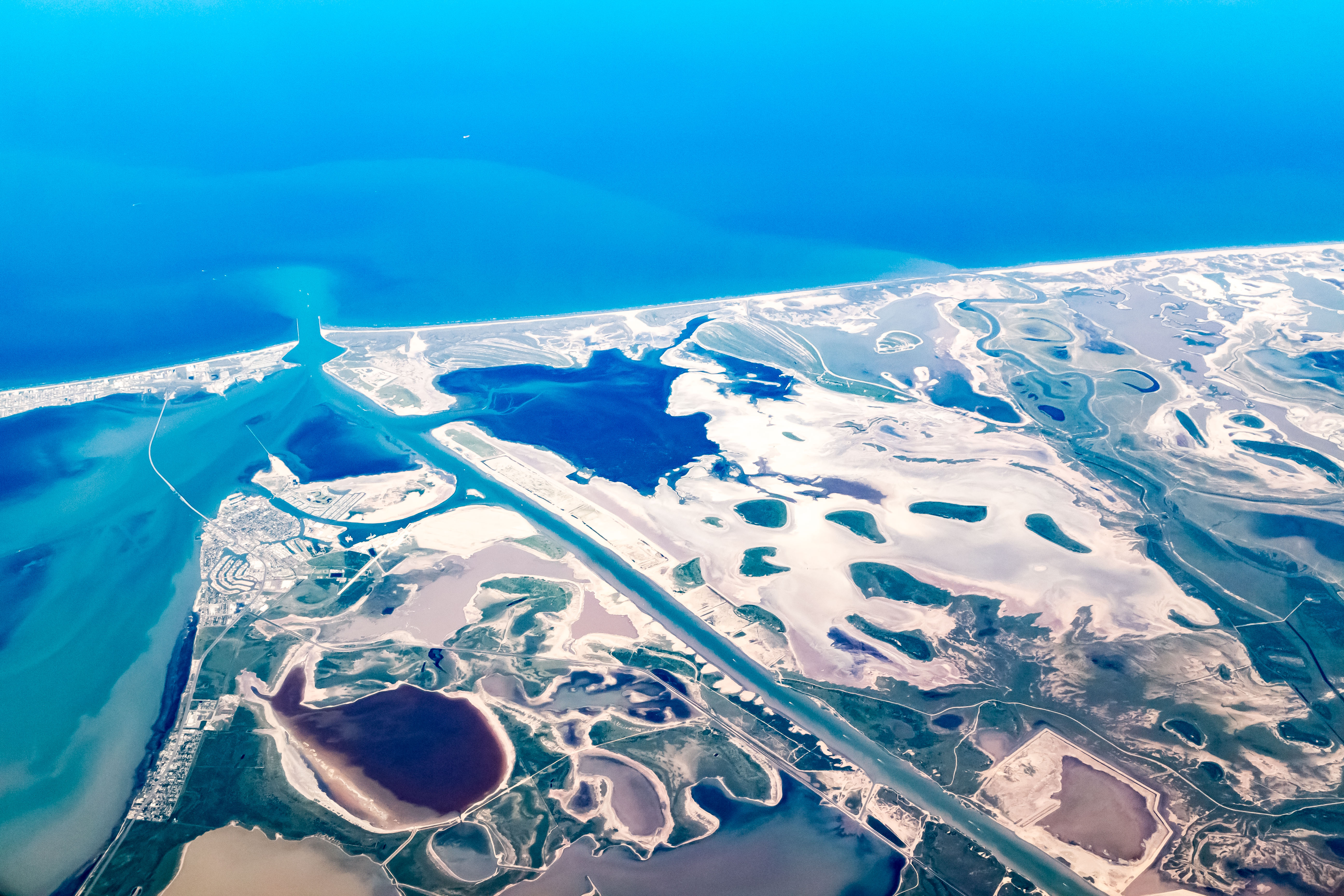
Port Isabel Aerial Photo, July 2015

Port Isabel maintains the Port Isabel-Cameron County Airport (FAA Code: PIL).

The United States Postal Service operates the Port Isabel Post Office.

Port Isabel connects with South Padre Island via the Queen Isabella Causeway.

U.S. Immigration and Customs Enforcement operates the Port Isabel Service Processing Center, which is located in an unincorporated area adjacent to Port Isabel-Cameron County Airport, 12 miles (19 km) to the northwest of the center of Port Isabel.

== Education ==
Children living in Port Isabel are zoned to schools in Point Isabel Independent School District. Children go to Garriga Elementary School (grades K–2), Derry Elementary School (3–5), Port Isabel Junior High School (6–8), and Port Isabel High School (9–12). All of the schools are located in Port Isabel. The mascot of both the junior high and high school is the Tarpon.

In addition, children may apply to schools in South Texas Independent School District.

The designated community college for Point Isabel ISD and all of Cameron County is Texas Southmost College.

The Port Isabel Public Library serves Port Isabel.

== Climate ==
Climate data for Port Isabel Cameron Co Airport, Texas (1981-2010)
Month	Jan	Feb	Mar	Apr	May	Jun	Jul	Aug	Sep	Oct	Nov	Dec	Year
Mean daily maximum °F (°C)	69.4 (20.8)	71.8 (22.1)	77.2 (25.1)	82.4 (28.0)	87.1 (30.6)	91.1 (32.8)	92.7 (33.7)	92.9 (33.8)	89.6 (32.0)	84.8 (29.3)	78.5 (25.8)	70.5 (21.4)	82.3 (28.0)
Mean daily minimum °F (°C)	52.4 (11.3)	55.0 (12.8)	60.2 (15.7)	67.0 (19.4)	73.6 (23.1)	77.3 (25.2)	77.9 (25.5)	77.2 (25.1)	75.1 (23.9)	68.5 (20.3)	61.3 (16.3)	53.5 (11.9)	66.6 (19.2)
Average precipitation inches (mm)	1.21 (31)	1.44 (37)	1.11 (28)	1.41 (36)	2.61 (66)	2.45 (62)	2.13 (54)	2.06 (52)	5.32 (135)	2.91 (74)	2.15 (55)	1.30 (33)	26.1 (663)
Source: NOAA
