= Isabel (disambiguation) =

Isabel (French variation, Isabelle) is a feminine given name. It is also a surname.

Isabel or Isabelle may also refer to:

== People ==
- Isabel, a figure in the Book of Mormon
- Isabel of Gloucester (c. 1173 – 1217)
- Saint Isabelle of France (1225–1270)
- Isabella of Aragon, Queen of France (1247–1271)
- Isabella of Aragon, Queen of Germany (1305–1330)
- Isabel of Majorca (1337–1406)
- Infanta Isabel, Duchess of Burgundy (1397–1471)
- Isabel of Coimbra (1432–1455), Queen Consort of Alphonse V of Portugal
- Isabel, Princess Imperial of Brazil (1846–1921)
- Isabel Cristina (1962–1982), Brazilian martyr of chastity and blessed
- Isabel Hornibrook (1859-1952), Irish-born American children's literature writer
- Isabel Perón (born 1931), president of Argentina
- Thibault Isabel (born 1978), French writer and publisher
- Isabel of Portugal (disambiguation)

=== Fictional characters ===
- Isabel (The Office), a character in The Office

== Places ==
- Isabel (crater), a lunar crater

=== Philippines ===
- Isabel, Leyte
- Isabel Island (Philippines)

=== Solomon Islands ===
- Isabel Province

=== United States ===
- Isabel, Illinois
- Isabel, Kansas
- Isabel, North Dakota
- Isabel, South Dakota
- Point Isabel (disambiguation)
- Port Isabel, Texas

=== Lists of places ===
- Port Isabel (disambiguation)
- Isabel Island (disambiguation)

== Arts, entertainment, media ==
- Isabel (film), a 1968 Canadian film
- Isabel (TV series), a Spanish historical fiction TV series based upon Queen Isabella I of Castile
- "Isabel" (Il Divo song), a 2005 song by Il Divo from Ancora
- "Isabel", a song by The Wombats from their 2015 album Glitterbug

== Ships ==
- Isabel (1850 ship), a British Arctic-exploration vessel launched in 1850
- USS Isabel, a 1917 patrol boat in the U.S. Navy during World War I
- USS Falcon (1846) or Isabel, a Mexican gunboat captured by the U.S. Navy in 1846

== Other uses ==
- Isabel (bug), a genus of insects
- Isabel naked-tailed rat, a rodent found in Papua New Guinea and the Solomon Islands
- Isabelle (proof assistant), an automated theorem prover

== See also ==
- List of storms named Isabel, several named storms
- Saint Isabel (disambiguation)
- Santa Isabel (disambiguation)
- Queen Isabella (disambiguation)
- Isabela (disambiguation)
- Isabelita (disambiguation)
- Isabella (disambiguation)
- Isabelle (disambiguation)
- Isobel (disambiguation)
