= Guyangan Cave System =

Caves and archaeological site in the Philippines

- Mga Yungib ng Guyangan (Filipino)
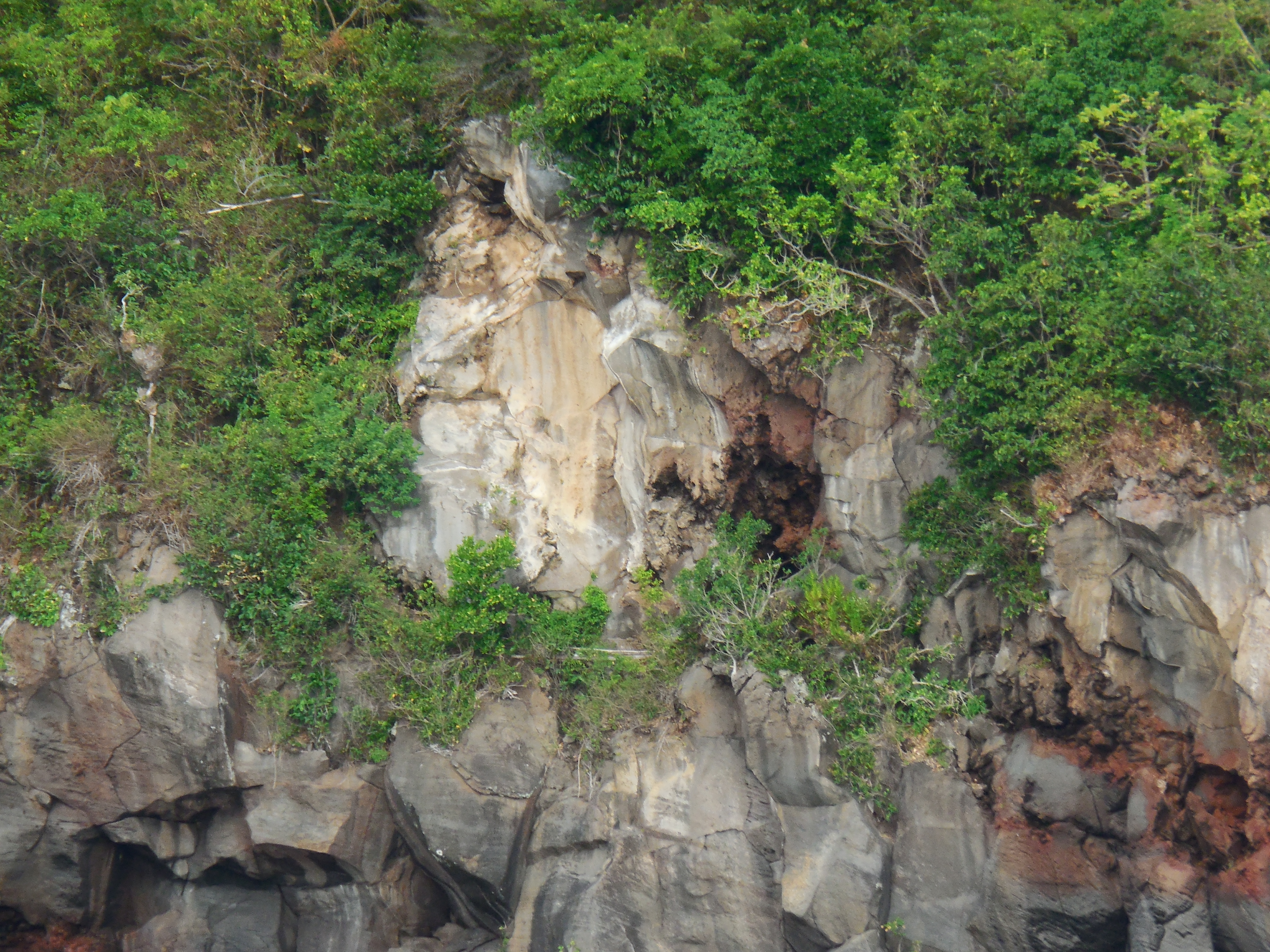
- Ipot Cave, one of the caves in the Guyangan Cave System, where the earliest known warp ikat textile in the Philippines and Southeast Asia was found in 1936.

- Location of Guyangan Cave System in the Philippines
- 12.9541082°N 122.0908323°E
- Location: Banton, Romblon, Philippines

Site notes
- Management: National Museum of the Philippines

The Guyangan Cave System (Filipino: Mga Yungib ng Guyangan) is a group of caves located in the island municipality of Banton, Romblon in the Philippines. It is located in Guyangan Hill, a limestone formation situated in barangays Togbongan and Toctoc, and consists of seven caves spread in an 85.3-hectare (211-acre) area of forest land.

The caves are a significant archaeological site and a national cultural treasure of the Philippines as it is the site of ancient burial grounds where wooden coffins, human skeletal remains as well as the oldest burial cloth in Southeast Asia were discovered during explorations by the National Museum of the Philippines in 1936. These artifacts are now displayed at the National Museum of Anthropology in Manila.

== Geography ==
The island of Banton, where the cave system is located, lies on the northern portion of the Sibuyan Sea, and is equidistant between Marinduque Island to the north and Tablas Island to the south. It is composed of the main island of Banton and the uninhabited islands of Bantoncillo, Carlota and Isabel, the last two of which are collectively known as the Dos Hermanas Islands. There is also an islet near Tabonan Beach on the north-west of the island.

Banton has a total land area of 3,248 hectares (32.48 km^{2}). Based on rock petrology, the island is a dormant volcano which lies at the southernmost portion of the Pleistocene-Quaternary West Luzon volcanic arc and may have been active during the Pliocene period. Because of its volcanic origin, the island has a mountainous, rocky topography, with very few patches of flat land suitable for farming. The island's highest elevation, Mount Ampongo, rises at 596 metres (1,955 ft). Guyangan Hill, where the cave complex is situated is located on the northeast side of the island, between the barangays (villages) of Togbongan and Toctoc. The hill is also located near the village of Poblacion, the main population center of the island.

== Caves ==
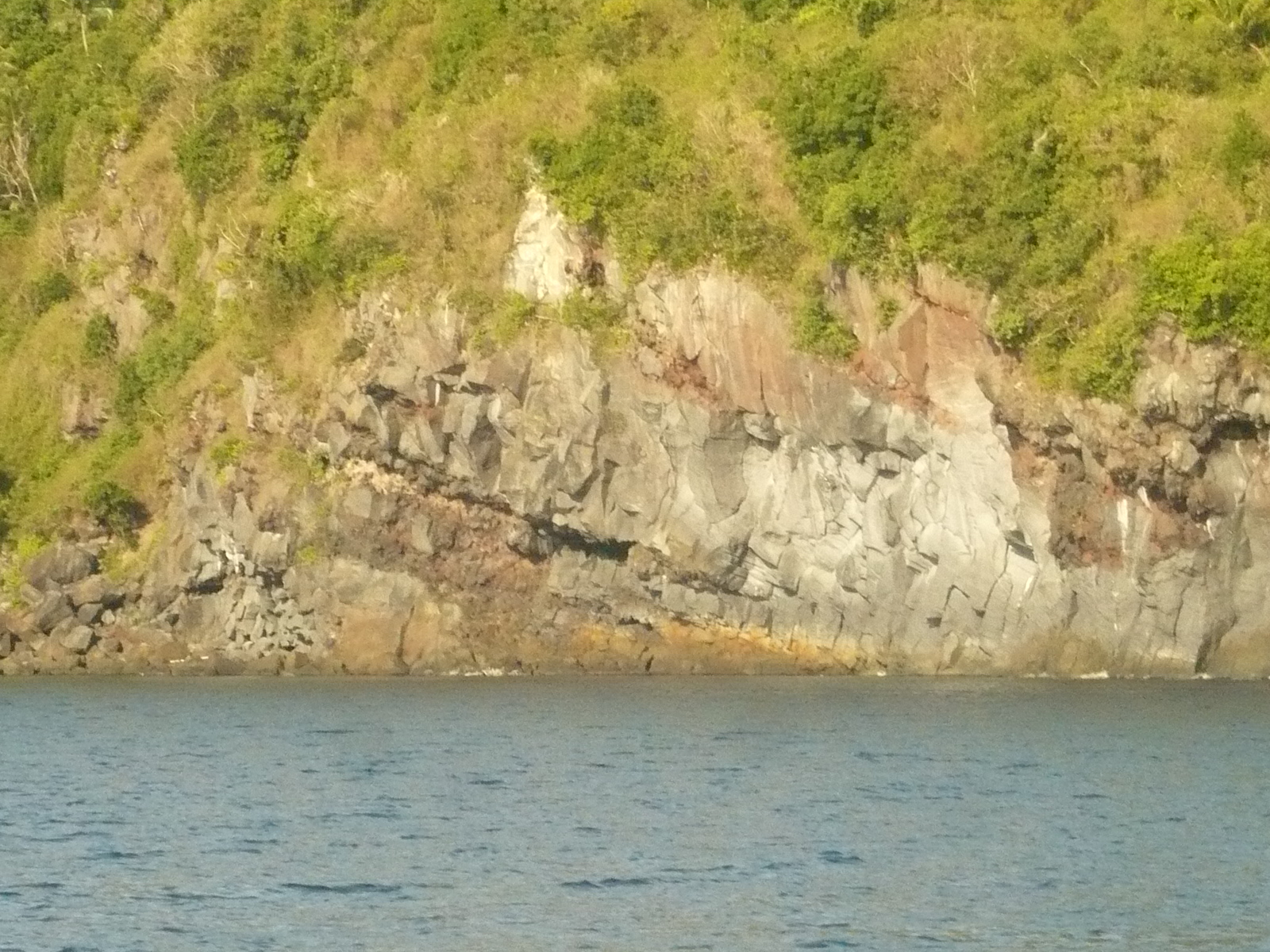
Ipot Cave, one of the caves in the Guyangan Cave System.

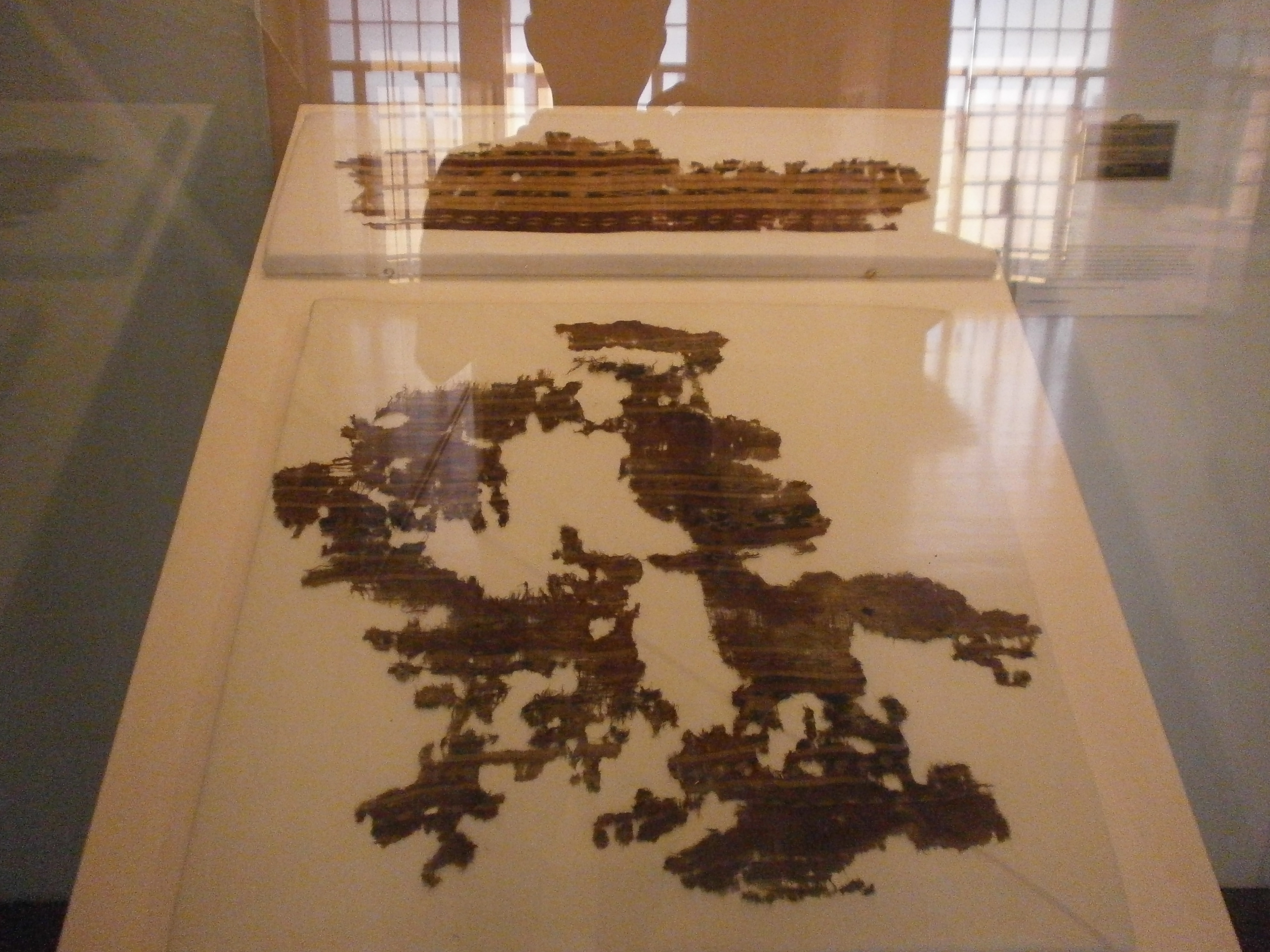
The Banton Cloth, the oldest existing example of warp ikat in Southeast Asia, displayed at the National Museum of the Philippines.

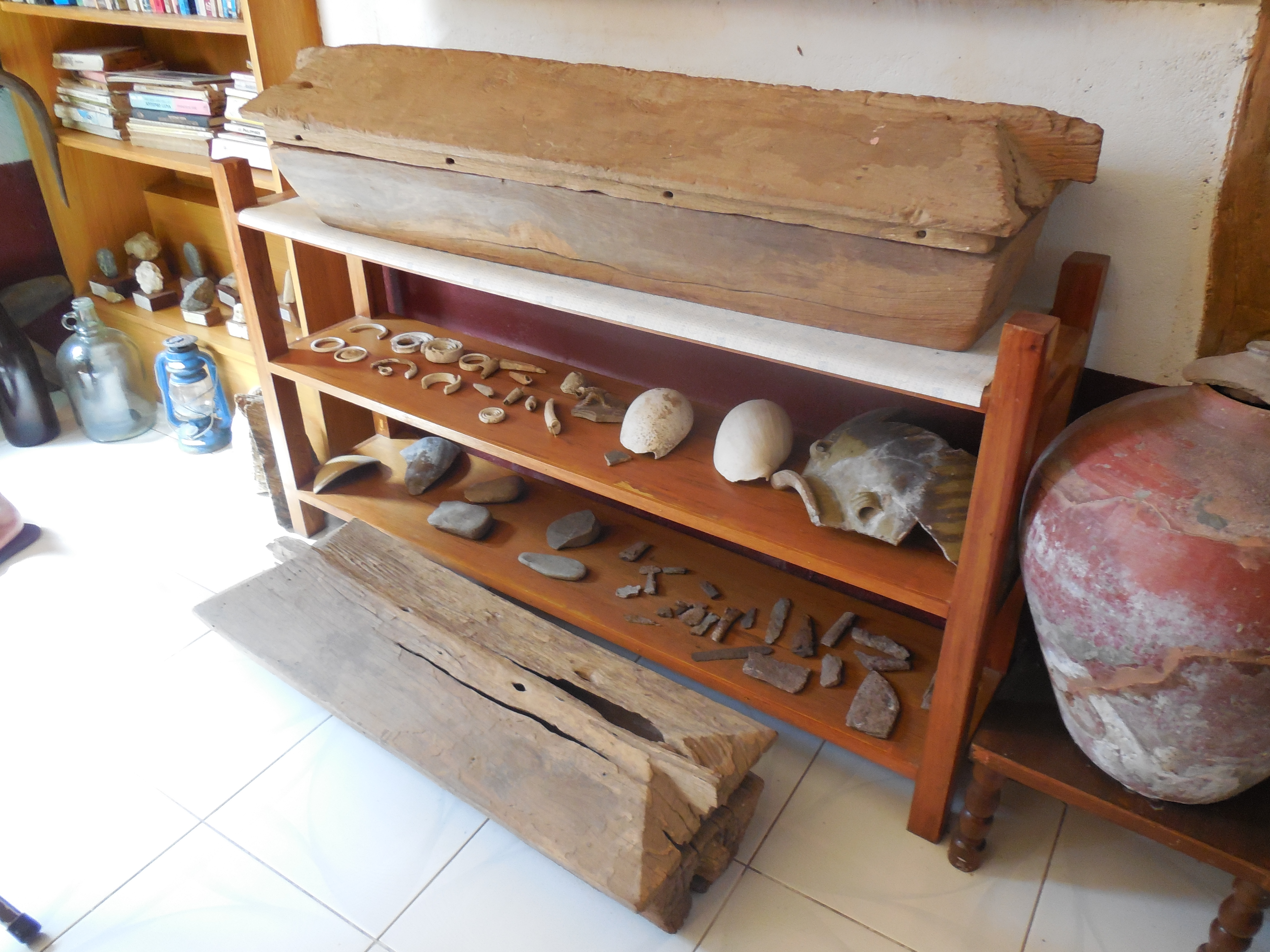
One of the wooden coffins discovered in the Guyangan Cave System in 1936, now displayed at the Asi Studies Center for Culture and the Arts in Banton, Romblon.

The Guyangan Cave System is composed of seven caves spread of an 85.3-hectare (211-acre) area of forested land.

- Ipot Cave, situated on a limestone cliff facing the Sibuyan Sea, is a dwelling place of swifts (locally known as balinsasadaw, hence its name ipot which refers to bird droppings) and is where the archaeological artifacts were discovered in 1936.
- Cathedral Cave is the largest cave in the complex and may have been used as a shelter by precolonial people.
- Tigpuyo Cave, which is situated on top of the hill, is believed to have been used as dwelling place as suggested by the seashells, bones of edible animals and pieces of pottery found here. It seemed a perfect location as a hideout, given its narrow and difficult vertical entrance.
- Wall Cave, which is a shallow cave on a huge rock wall (hence the name) is believed to be the primary burial site for the human skeletal remains found in Ipot Cave, as proven by excavated human remains that were buried on shallow graves on the foot of the cave.
- Slide Cave, named after a smooth diagonal-surfaced rock, is another primary burial cave.
- De Campo Cave was named as such because it resembles a tent, although no archaeological artifacts were found in the cave.
- Silak Cave is the easiest cave to reach and the first cave in the system to be named. The cave was named such as it faces the east and receives plenty of light (silak in the Asi language) during sunrise. It is located in a cliff that offers a view of the Togbongan coastline.

== Archaeological discoveries ==
In 1936, a team of researchers from the National of the Museum of the Philippines arrived in the island after a local farmer discovered several precolonial artifacts in one of the caves in Guyangan Hill. Among the artifacts discovered are several shards of Chinese ceramics, wooden coffins with human skeletal remains as well as pieces of a burial cloth, locally known as ikat, and which they named the Banton Cloth. The researchers estimated the burial cloth to be around 400 years old, making it the earliest known warp ikat (tie-resist dyeing) textile in the Philippines and Southeast Asia. These artifacts are now displayed at the National Museum of Anthropology in Manila as well as in the Asi Studies Center for Culture and the Arts in Banton.

The discovery of the artifacts proved that there was already a civilization residing in Banton during precolonial times. The researchers also observed that the human skeletal remains exhibited artificial cranial deformation, a common traditional practice among precolonial Filipinos, especially among the nobility, which presumes that the remains belonged to members of the nobility in Banton's precolonial society. It has also been theorized that the caves were used as a secondary burial site after the bodies were exhumed from a primary burial site elsewhere in the island.

== National Cultural Property ==
On 19 March 2013, the National Museum of the Philippines declared the Guyangan Cave System as an Important Cultural Property. As such, the cave complex is entitled to protection and preservation by the Philippine government through the National Museum of the Philippines. In 2016, The National Museum of the Philippines announced the construction of a site museum in the island on a 1.5-hectare (3.7-acre) property donated by the Fabicon family. The site museum will serve as depository of the island's cultural treasures and will conduct research on how to best preserve the island's intangible heritage.

== See also ==
- Banton, Romblon
- Tabon Caves
- Callao Cave
- Kalanay Cave
- Minori Cave
- Lapuz Lapuz Cave
