= Laguna Heights, Texas =

- Census-designated place
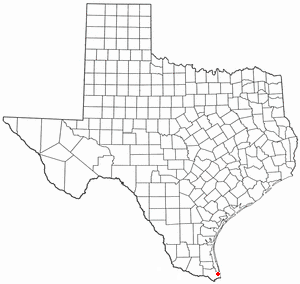
- Location of Laguna Heights, Texas

- Coordinates: 26°4′48″N 97°15′22″W
- Country: United States
- State: Texas
- County: Cameron

Area
  - Total: 0.59 sq mi (1.54 km^{2})
  - Land: 0.59 sq mi (1.54 km^{2})
  - Water: 0 sq mi (0.0 km^{2})
- Elevation: 9.8 ft (3 m)

Population (2020)
  - Total: 962
  - Density: 1,620/sq mi (625/km^{2})
- Time zone: UTC-6 (Central (CST))
  - Summer (DST): UTC-5 (CDT)
- ZIP code: 78578
- Area code: 956
- FIPS code: 48-40300
- GNIS feature ID: 1374433

Laguna Heights is a census-designated place (CDP) in Cameron County, Texas, United States. The population was 962 at the 2020 census, significantly down from 3,488 at the 2010 census.

== History ==
Laguna Heights was struck by a high-end EF1 tornado on May 13, 2023, which caused major damage to properties, killed one person, and injured 11 others.

== Geography ==
Laguna Heights is located in eastern Cameron County at 26°4′48″N 97°15′22″W (26.080060, -97.256172), on the south shore of Laguna Madre, a large lagoon connected to the Gulf of Mexico. The CDP is bordered to the south and east by the city of Port Isabel and to the west by the town of Laguna Vista. Texas State Highway 100 passes through Laguna Heights, leading eastward 3 miles (5 km) to the center of Port Isabel and 6 miles (10 km) to South Padre Island, and westward 21 miles (34 km) to Interstate 69E between Harlingen and Brownsville.

According to the United States Census Bureau, the Laguna Heights CDP has a total area of 0.59 square miles (1.54 km^{2}), all land.

== Demographics ==
Historical population
| Census | Pop. | Note | %± |
|---|---|---|---|
| 1990 | 1,671 | | — |
| 2000 | 1,990 | | 19.1% |
| 2010 | 3,488 | | 75.3% |
| 2020 | 962 | | −72.4% |
U.S. Decennial Census; 1850–1900 1910; 1920 1930 1940; 1950 1960 1970; 1980 1990 2000; 2010 2020

Laguna Heights first appeared as a census designated place in the 1990 U.S. census. It is part of the Brownsville–Harlingen Metropolitan Statistical Area.

=== 2020 census ===
Laguna Heights CDP, Texas – Racial and ethnic composition Note: the US Census treats Hispanic/Latino as an ethnic category. This table excludes Latinos from the racial categories and assigns them to a separate category. Hispanics/Latinos may be of any race.
| Race / Ethnicity (NH = Non-Hispanic) | Pop 2000 | Pop 2010 | Pop 2020 | % 2000 | % 2010 | % 2020 |
|---|---|---|---|---|---|---|
| White alone (NH) | 127 | 453 | 58 | 6.38% | 12.99% | 6.03% |
| Black or African American alone (NH) | 3 | 5 | 2 | 0.15% | 0.14% | 0.21% |
| Native American or Alaska Native alone (NH) | 1 | 5 | 7 | 0.05% | 0.14% | 0.73% |
| Asian alone (NH) | 1 | 5 | 2 | 0.05% | 0.14% | 0.21% |
| Native Hawaiian or Pacific Islander alone (NH) | 0 | 7 | 0 | 0.00% | 0.20% | 0.00% |
| Other race alone (NH) | 0 | 0 | 7 | 0.00% | 0.00% | 0.73% |
| Mixed race or Multiracial (NH) | 1 | 7 | 2 | 0.05% | 0.20% | 0.21% |
| Hispanic or Latino (any race) | 1,857 | 3,006 | 884 | 93.32% | 86.18% | 91.89% |
| Total | 1,990 | 3,488 | 962 | 100.00% | 100.00% | 100.00% |

As of the 2020 United States census, there were 962 people, 575 households, and 371 families residing in the CDP.

=== 2010 census ===
As of the census of 2010, there were 3,488 people, 528 households, and 459 families residing in the CDP. The population density was 7,202.3 inhabitants per square mile (2,780.8/km^{2}). There were 572 housing units at an average density of 2,070.2 per square mile (799.3/km^{2}). The racial makeup of the CDP was 67.19% White, 0.85% African American, 0.30% Native American, 0.05% Asian, 29.40% from other races, and 2.21% from two or more races. Hispanic or Latino of any race were 93.32% of the population.

There were 528 households, out of which 56.8% had children under the age of 18 living with them, 64.8% were married couples living together, 15.0% had a female householder with no husband present, and 12.9% were non-families. 10.8% of all households were made up of individuals, and 2.8% had someone living alone who was 65 years of age or older. The average household size was 3.77 and the average family size was 4.04.

In the CDP, the population was spread out, with 37.5% under the age of 18, 12.2% from 18 to 24, 30.1% from 25 to 44, 14.8% from 45 to 64, and 5.4% who were 65 years of age or older. The median age was 25 years. For every 100 females, there were 100.4 males. For every 100 females age 18 and over, there were 97.9 males.

The median income for a household in the CDP was $18,083, and the median income for a family was $19,491. Males had a median income of $15,677 versus $14,861 for females. The per capita income for the CDP was $6,538. About 37.7% of families and 45.6% of the population were below the poverty line, including 55.4% of those under age 18 and 25.6% of those age 65 or over.

== Education ==
Children living in Laguna Heights are zoned to schools in Point Isabel Independent School District. Children go to Garriga Elementary School (Grades K-2), Derry Elementary School, (3-5), Port Isabel Junior High School (6-8), and Port Isabel High School (9-12). All of the schools are in Port Isabel.

In addition, South Texas Independent School District operates magnet schools that serve the community.
