= Port Isabel =

Port Isabel may refer to:

== Places ==
- Port Isabel, Texas, USA; a city in Cameron County
- Port Isabel, Sonora, Mexico; a former port (1864-1879) at the mouth of the Colorado River
- Port Isabel Independent School District, Cameron County, Texas, USA
- Port Isabel Slough, Sonora, Mexico; a slough in the Colorado River

== Facilities and structures ==
- Port Isabel-Cameron County Airport, Texas, USA
- Port Isabel Air Force Station, Brownsville, Texas, USA
- Port Isabel Detention Center, Los Fresnos, Texas, USA; a federal ICE detention center
- Port Isabel High School, Port Isabel, Texas, USA

== See also ==
- Point Isabel (disambiguation)
- Isabel (disambiguation)
- Port (disambiguation)
