= SMS Dresden (1907) =

Light cruiser of the German Imperial Navy

Coordinates: 33°38′8″S 78°49′7″W

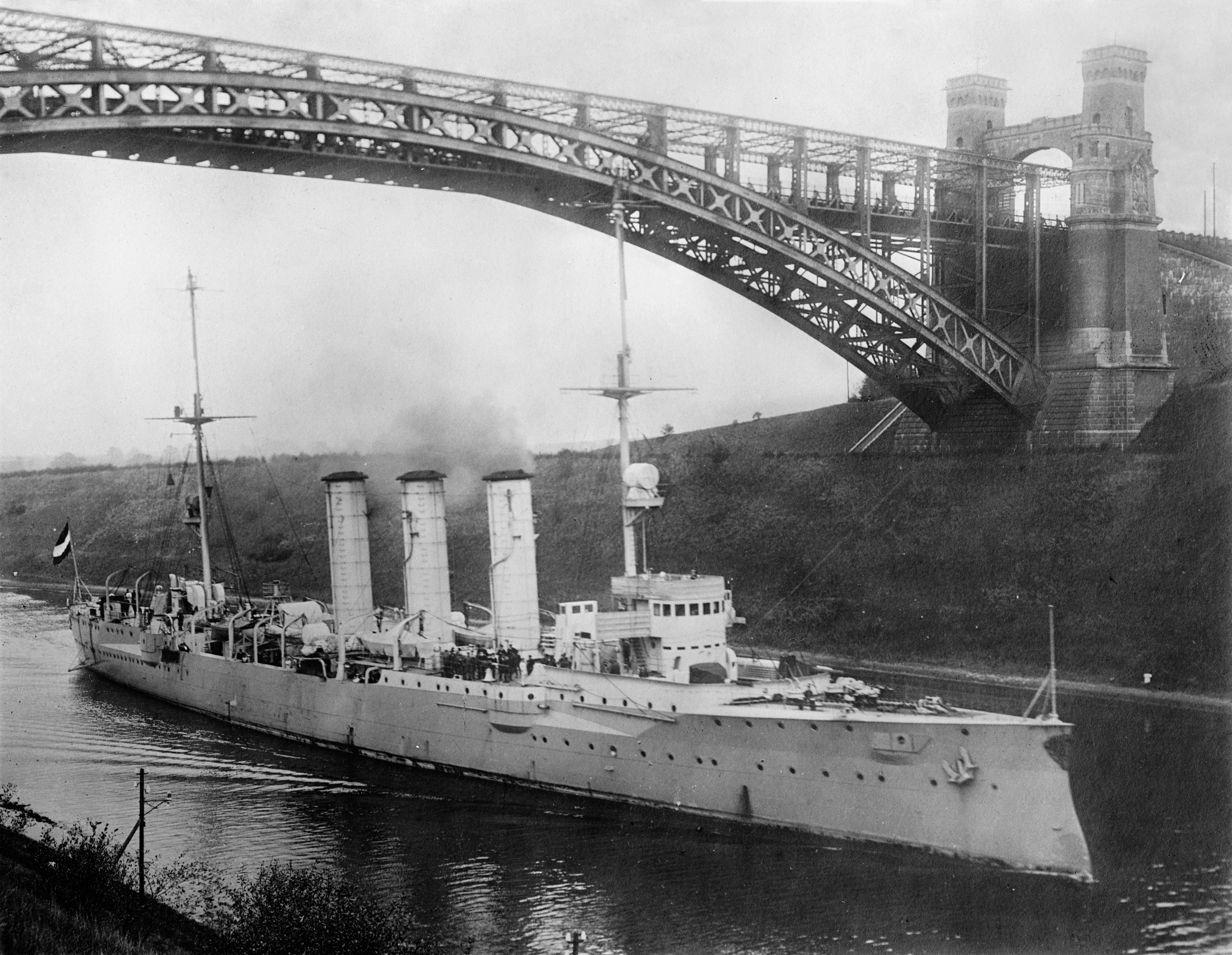
- SMS Dresden transiting the Kaiser Wilhelm Canal

History

German Empire
- Name: Dresden
- Namesake: City of Dresden
- Builder: Blohm & Voss, Hamburg
- Laid down: 1906
- Launched: 5 October 1907
- Commissioned: 14 November 1908
- Fate: Scuttled off Robinson Crusoe Island, 14 March 1915

General characteristics
- Class & type: Dresden-class cruiser
- Displacement: Normal: 3,664 t (3,606 long tons); Full load: 4,268 t (4,201 long tons)
- Length: 118.3 m (388 ft 1 in)
- Beam: 13.5 m (44 ft 3 in)
- Draft: 5.53 m (18 ft 2 in)
- Installed power: 12 water-tube boilers; 14,794 shp (11,032 kW)
- Propulsion: 2 × Parsons steam turbines; 2 × screw propellers
- Speed: 24 knots (44 km/h; 28 mph)
- Range: 3,600 nmi (6,700 km; 4,100 mi) at 12 knots (22 km/h; 14 mph)
- Complement: 18 officers; 343 enlisted men
- Armament: 10 × 10.5 cm (4.1 in) SK L/40 guns; 8 × 5.2 cm (2 in) SK L/55 guns; 2 × 45 cm (17.7 in) torpedo tubes
- Armor: Deck: 80 mm (3.1 in); Conning tower: 100 mm (3.9 in); Gun shields: 50 mm (2 in)

SMS Dresden ("His Majesty's Ship Dresden") (Note: "SMS" stands for "Seiner Majestät Schiff" (German: His Majesty's Ship).) was a German light cruiser built for the Kaiserliche Marine (Imperial Navy). The lead ship of her class, she was laid down at the Blohm & Voss shipyard in Hamburg in 1906, launched in October 1907, and completed in November 1908. Her entrance into service was delayed by accidents during sea trials, including a collision with another vessel which necessitated major repairs. Like the preceding Königsberg-class cruisers upon which her design was based, Dresden was armed with ten 10.5 cm (4.1 in) SK L/40 guns and two torpedo tubes.

Dresden spent much of her career overseas. After commissioning, she visited the United States in 1909 during the Hudson–Fulton Celebration, before returning to Germany to serve in the reconnaissance force of the High Seas Fleet for three years. In 1913, she was assigned to the Mediterranean Division. She was then sent to the Caribbean to protect German nationals during the Mexican Revolution. In mid-1914, she carried the former dictator Victoriano Huerta to Jamaica, where the British had granted him asylum. She was due to return to Germany in July 1914, but was prevented from doing so by the outbreak of World War I. At the onset of hostilities, Dresden operated as a commerce raider in South American waters in the Atlantic, then moved to the Pacific Ocean in September and joined Maximilian von Spee's East Asia Squadron.

Dresden saw action in the Battle of Coronel in November, where she engaged the British cruiser HMS Glasgow, and at the Battle of the Falkland Islands in December, where she was the only German warship to escape destruction. She eluded her British pursuers for several more months, until she put into Robinson Crusoe Island in March 1915. Her engines were worn out and she had almost no coal left for her boilers, so the ship's captain contacted the local Chilean authorities to have Dresden interned. She was trapped by British cruisers, including her old opponent Glasgow. The British violated Chilean neutrality and opened fire on the ship in the Battle of Más a Tierra. The Germans scuttled Dresden and the majority of the crew escaped to be interned in Chile for the duration of the war. The wreck remains in the harbor; several artifacts, including her bell and compass, have been returned to Germany.

== Design ==
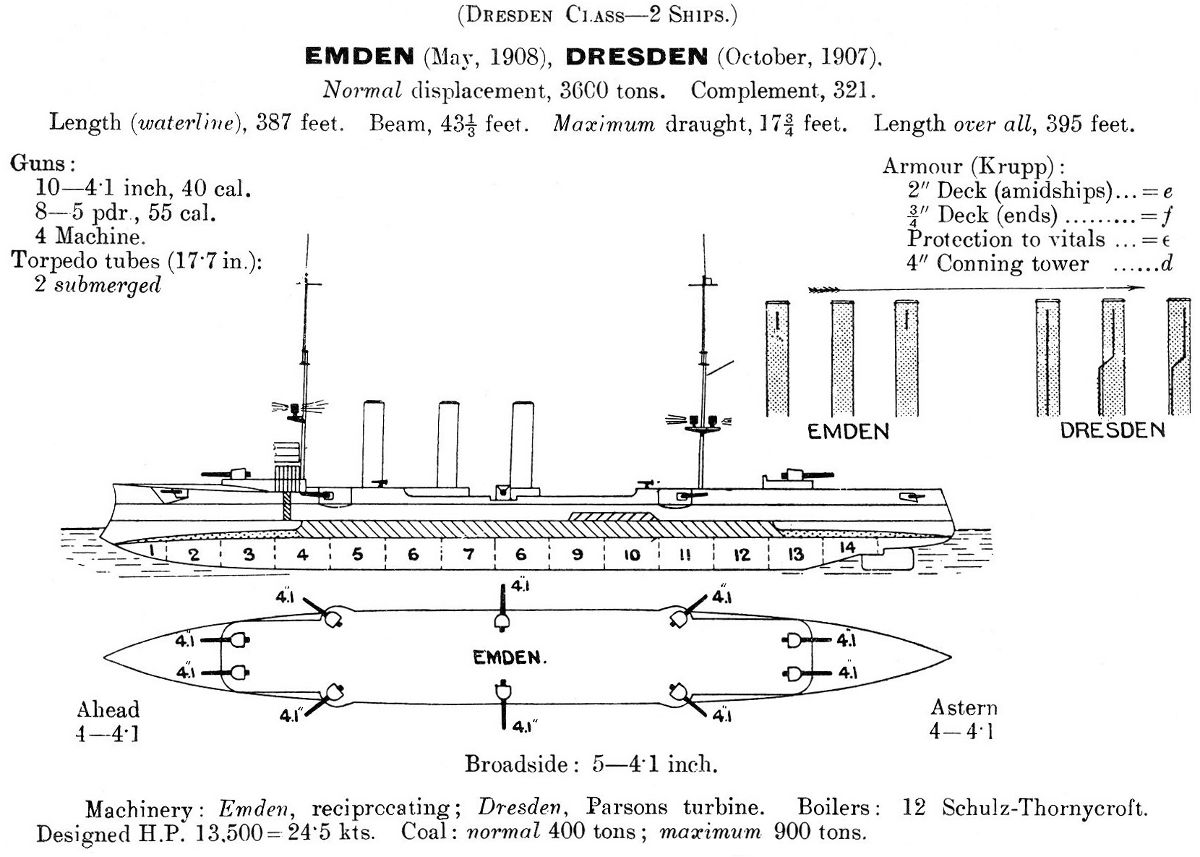
Line-drawing of the Dresden class

The 1898 Naval Law authorized the construction of thirty new light cruisers; the program began with the Gazelle class, which was developed into the Bremen and Königsberg classes, both of which incorporated incremental improvements over the course of construction. The primary alteration for the two Dresden-class cruisers, assigned to the 1906 fiscal year, consisted of an additional boiler for the propulsion system to increase engine power.

Dresden was 118.3 meters (388 ft 1 in) long overall with a beam of 13.5 m (44 ft 3 in) and a draft of 5.53 m (18 ft 2 in) forward. She displaced 3,664 metric tons (3,606 long tons) as designed and up to 4,268 t (4,201 long tons) at full load. The ship had a minimal superstructure, which consisted of a small conning tower and bridge structure. Her hull had a raised forecastle and quarterdeck, along with a pronounced ram bow. She was fitted with two pole masts. She had a crew of 18 officers and 343 enlisted men.

Her propulsion system consisted of two Parsons steam turbines, which drove a pair of screw propellers. Steam was provided by twelve coal-fired water-tube boilers that were vented through three funnels. The propulsion system was designed to give 15,000 metric horsepower (11,000 kW) for a top speed of 24 knots (44 km/h; 28 mph). Dresden carried up to 860 t (850 long tons) of coal, which gave her a range of 3,600 nautical miles (6,700 km; 4,100 mi) at 14 knots (26 km/h; 16 mph).

The ship was armed with a main battery of ten 10.5 cm (4.1 in) SK L/40 guns in single pivot mounts. Two were placed side by side forward on the forecastle; six were located on the broadside, three on either side; and two were placed side by side aft. The guns could engage targets out to 12,200 m (13,300 yd). They were supplied with 1,500 rounds of ammunition, for 150 shells per gun. The secondary battery comprised eight 5.2 cm (2 in) SK L/55 guns, with 4,000 rounds of ammunition. She was also equipped with two 45 cm (17.7 in) torpedo tubes with four torpedoes, mounted on the deck.

The ship was protected by a curved armored deck that was up to 80 mm (3.1 in) thick. It sloped downward at the sides of the hull to provide defense against incoming fire; the sloped portion was 50 mm (2 in) thick. The conning tower had 100 mm (3.9 in) thick sides, and the guns were protected by 50 mm (2 in) thick gun shields.

== Service history ==
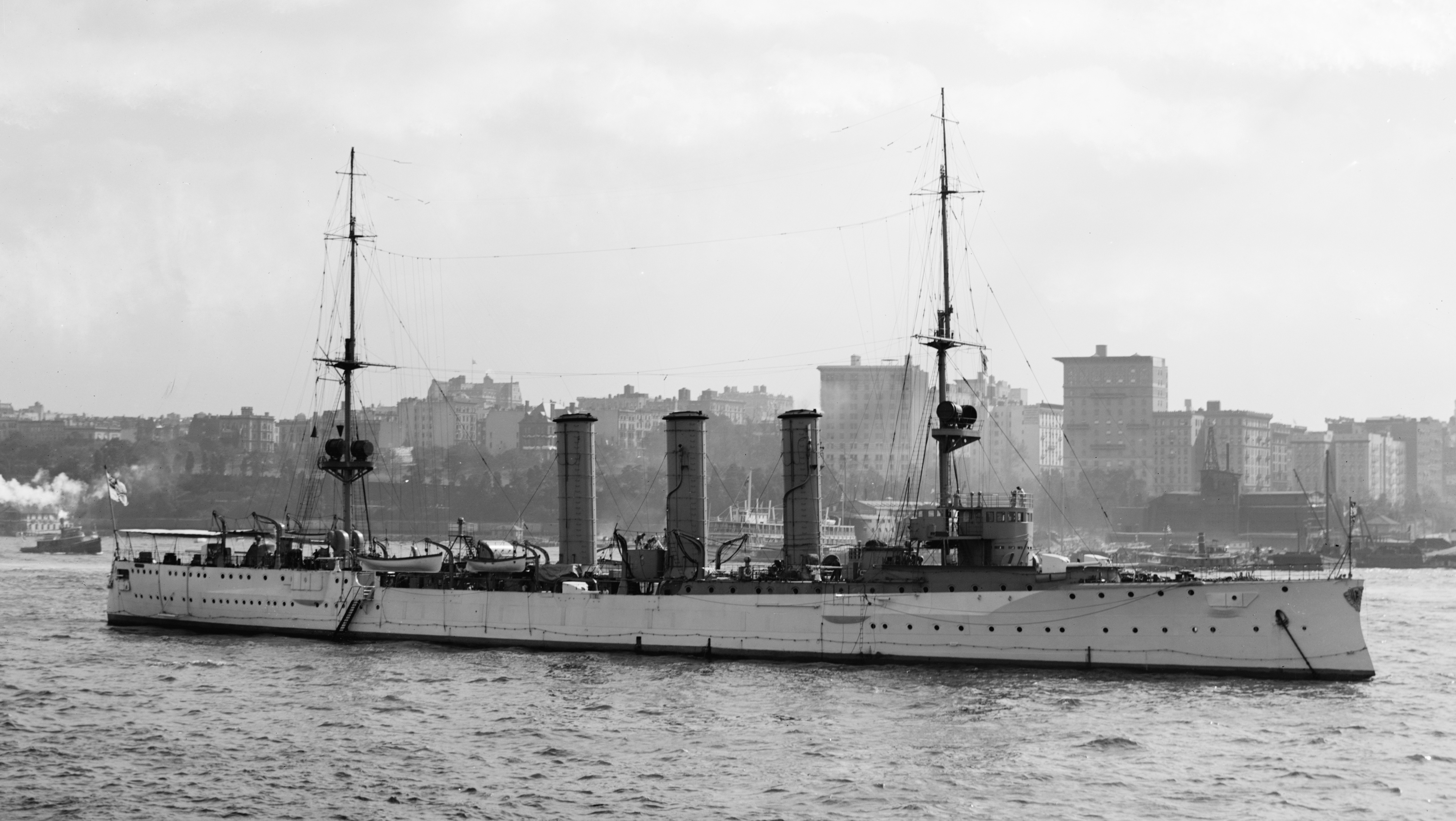
Dresden visiting New York City in October 1909

Dresden was ordered under the contract name Ersatz Comet. (Note: German warships were ordered under provisional names. Additions to the fleet were given a single letter; ships intended to replace older or lost vessels were ordered as "Ersatz (name of the ship to be replaced)".) She was laid down at the Blohm & Voss shipyard in Hamburg in 1906 and launched on 5 October 1907. The Oberbürgermeister of her namesake city, Otto Beutler, christened the ship. Fitting-out work then commenced, and Dresden was commissioned into the High Seas Fleet on 14 November 1908. Following her commissioning, Dresden began her sea trials. On 28 November she accidentally collided with and sank the Swedish galeas Cäcilie outside Kiel. Dresden's starboard propeller shaft was shoved in 30 mm (1.2 in), and she required six months of repair work. She resumed sea trials in 1909, but a turbine accident necessitated further repairs, which lasted until September.

Although Dresden had not completed the required testing, her trials were declared over on 7 September, as she had been ordered to visit the United States. The purpose of the voyage was to represent Germany at the Hudson–Fulton Celebration in New York; Dresden was joined by the protected cruisers Hertha and Victoria Louise and the light cruiser Bremen. Dresden left Wilhelmshaven on 11 September and stopped in Newport, where she met the rest of the ships of the squadron. The ships arrived in New York on 24 September, remained there until 9 October, and arrived back in Germany on 22 October.

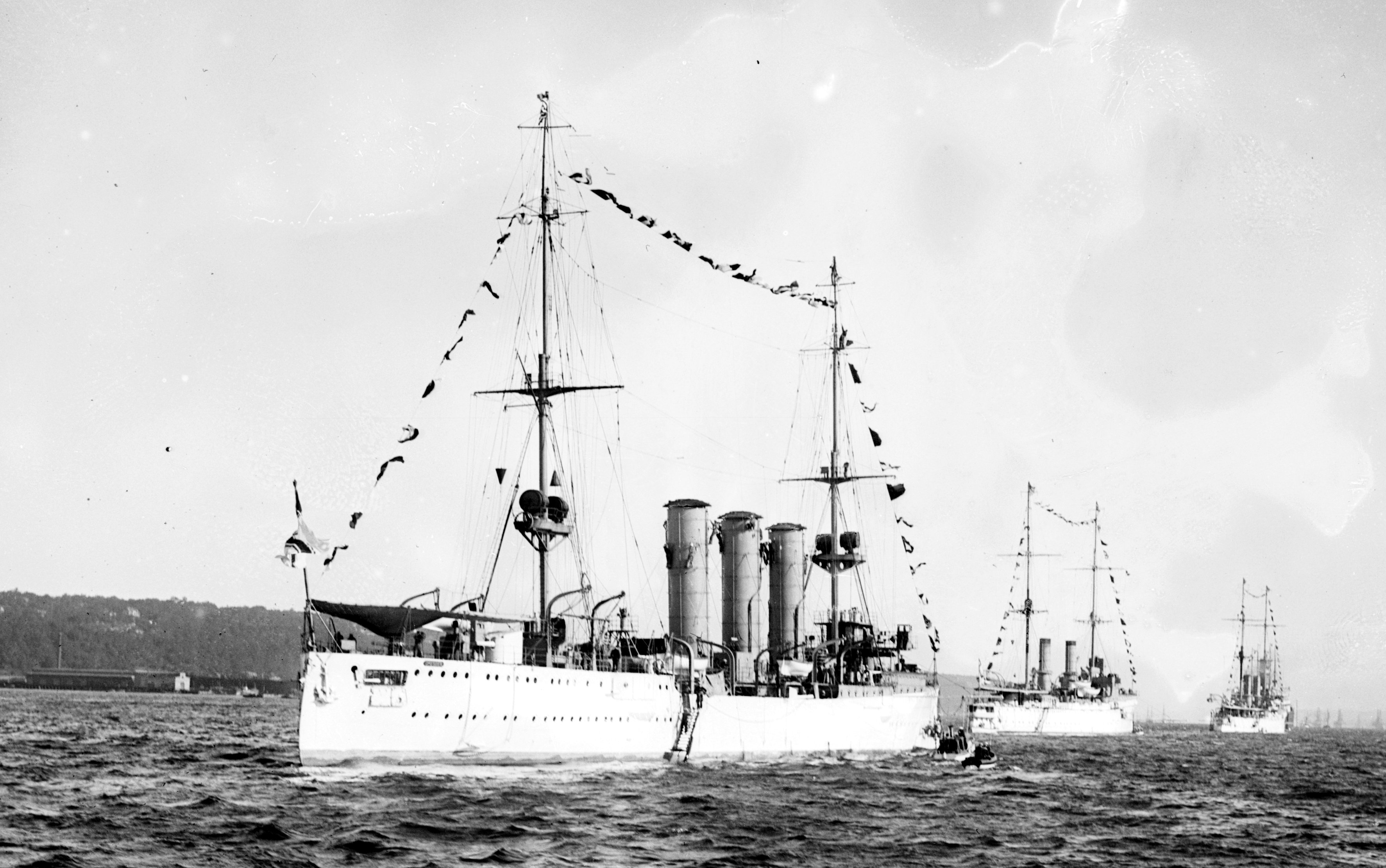
Dresden, Victoria Louise, and Hertha during the Hudson–Fulton Celebration in 1909

Dresden then joined the reconnaissance force for the High Seas Fleet; the following two years consisted of the peacetime routine of squadron exercises, training cruises, and annual fleet exercises. On 16 February 1910, she collided with the light cruiser Königsberg. The collision caused significant damage to Dresden, though no one on either vessel was injured. She made it back to Kiel for repairs, which lasted eight days. Dresden visited Hamburg on 13–17 May that year. From 14 to 20 April 1912, she was temporarily transferred to the Training Squadron, along with the armored cruiser Friedrich Carl and the light cruiser Mainz. For the year 1911–12, Dresden won the Kaiser's Schießpreis (Shooting Prize) for excellent gunnery amongst the light cruisers of the High Seas Fleet. From September 1912 through September 1913, she was commanded by Fregattenkapitän (Frigate Captain) Fritz Lüdecke, who would command the ship again during World War I.

On 6 April 1913, she and the cruiser Strassburg were sent from Kiel to the Adriatic Sea, where she joined the Mittelmeer-Division (Mediterranean Division), centered on the battlecruiser Goeben and commanded by Konteradmiral (Rear Admiral) Konrad Trummler. The ships cruised the eastern Mediterranean for several months, and in late August, Dresden was ordered to return to Germany. After arriving in Kiel on 23 September, she was taken into the Kaiserliche Werft (Imperial Shipyard) for an overhaul that lasted until the end of December. She was scheduled to return to the Mediterranean Division, but the Admiralstab (Admiralty Staff) reassigned Dresden to the North American station to protect German interests in the Mexican Revolution. The cruiser Bremen, then in North American waters, was also due to return to Germany, but her intended replacement, Karlsruhe, had not yet entered service. On 27 December 1913, Dresden departed Germany and arrived off Vera Cruz on 21 January 1914, under the command of Fregattenkapitän Erich Köhler. The United States had already sent a squadron of warships to the city, as had several other countries.

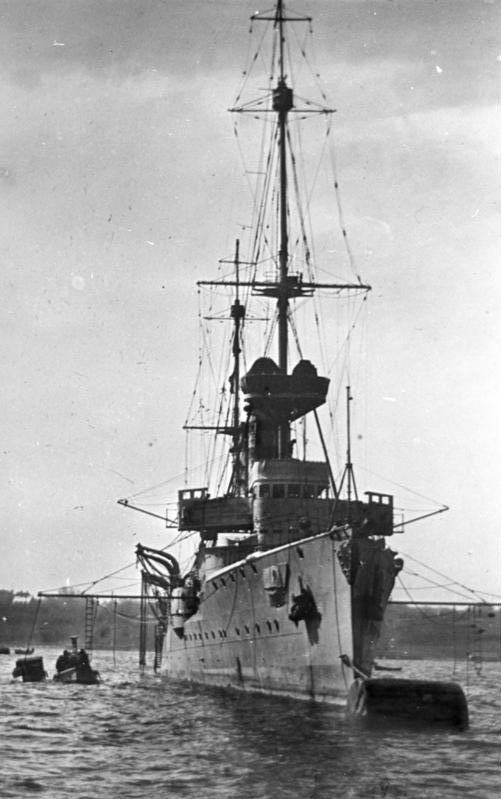
Dresden tied to a mooring buoy, location and date unknown

The Admiralstab ordered Hertha, which had been on a training cruise for naval cadets, to join Dresden off Mexico. Bremen was also recalled to reinforce the German naval contingent; after arriving, she was tasked with transferring European nationals to German HAPAG liners. Dresden and the British cruiser HMS Hermione rescued 900 American citizens trapped in a hotel in Vera Cruz and transferred them to American warships. The German consul in Mexico City requested additional forces, and so Dresden provided a landing party of a maat (Junior Petty Officer) and ten sailors, armed with two MG 08 machine guns. On 15 April 1914, Dresden steamed to Tampico on Mexico's Gulf coast. That month, the German-flagged merchant ship SS Ypiranga arrived in Mexico, carrying a load of small arms for the regime of Mexican dictator Victoriano Huerta. The United States had put an arms embargo into effect in an attempt to reduce the violence of the civil war. The US Navy intercepted Ypiranga on 21 April. Dresden arrived, confiscated the merchantman, and pressed her into naval service to transport German refugees out of Mexico. Despite the American embargo, the Germans delivered the weapons and ammunition to the Mexican government on 28 May.

On 20 July, after the Huerta regime was toppled, Dresden carried Huerta, his vice president, Aureliano Blanquet, and their families to Kingston, Jamaica, where Britain had granted them asylum. Upon arriving in Kingston on the 25th, Köhler learned of the rising political tensions in Europe during the July Crisis that followed the assassination of Archduke Franz Ferdinand. By this time, the ship was in need of a refit in Germany, and met with her replacement, Karlsruhe, in Port-au-Prince, Haiti, the following day. Lüdecke, who had arrived in command of Karlsruhe, traded places with Köhler aboard Dresden. The Admiralstab initially ordered Dresden to return to Germany for overhaul, but the heightened threat of war by the 31st led the staff to countermand the order, instead instructing Lüdecke to prepare to conduct Handelskrieg (trade war) in the Atlantic.

=== World War I ===
After receiving the order to remain in the Atlantic, Lüdecke turned his ship south while maintaining radio silence to prevent hostile warships from discovering his vessel. On the night of 4–5 August, he received a radio report informing him of Britain's declaration of war on Germany. He chose the South Atlantic as Dresden's operational area, and steamed to the Brazilian coast. Off the mouth of the Amazon River, he stopped a British merchant ship on 6 August. The ship, SS Drumcliffe, whose captain professed to know nothing of Britain's entry into the war, was permitted to proceed unmolested in accordance with the rules set forth in the Hague Convention of 1907. Dresden rendezvoused with the German collier SS Corrientes, a converted HSDG vessel. The cruiser moved to the Rocas Atoll on the 12th, along with the HAPAG steamships Prussia, Baden, and Persia. After leaving the atoll, en route to Trindade, Dresden caught the British steamship Hyades; Lüdecke took off the ship's crew and then sank the merchantman. Dresden captured the British collier Holmwood on 24 August and sank her after evacuating her crew. After arriving in Trindade, she rendezvoused with the gunboat Eber and several steamships.

On 26 August, while steaming off the mouth of the Río de la Plata, she caught two more British steamships, but the poor condition of Dresden's engines curtailed further operations. On 5 September, Dresden put into Hoste Island for engine maintenance until the 16th. While the ship was there, the HAPAG steamship Santa Isabel arrived from Punta Arenas with news of the war, and the heavy merchant traffic off the western coast of South America. Lüdecke decided to steam there, and on 18 September Dresden passed the Strait of Magellan. While en route, Dresden encountered the French steamship SS Ortega; Lüdecke refrained from attacking the transport ship, since she had fled into neutral waters. After steaming up the Chilean coast, she stopped in the Juan Fernández Islands, where she made radio contact with the light cruiser Leipzig, which was operating on the Pacific coast of South America. Dresden saw no further success against British shipping, and on 12 October, she joined Vizeadmiral (Vice Admiral) Maximilian von Spee's East Asia Squadron, which had crossed the Pacific and was coaling at Easter Island. The following day, Lüdecke was promoted to Kapitän zur See (Captain at Sea).

On 18 October, Dresden and the East Asia Squadron, centered on the armored cruisers Scharnhorst and Gneisenau, departed Easter Island for the South American coast. They arrived at Más a Fuera island on 26 October. The following evening, the German cruisers escorted the auxiliary cruiser SS Prinz Eitel Friedrich and the merchant ships SS Yorck and SS Göttingen to Chile. The flotilla arrived off Valparaíso on 30 October, and the following evening, Spee received intelligence that a British cruiser was at the Chilean port of Coronel. Spee decided his squadron should ambush the cruiser—HMS Glasgow—when it was forced to leave port due to Chile's neutral status, which required belligerent warships to leave after twenty-four hours. Spee did not realize Glasgow was in the company of Rear Admiral Christopher Craddock's 4th Cruiser Squadron, which also included the armored cruisers Monmouth and Good Hope and the auxiliary cruiser Otranto.

==== Battle of Coronel ====

Early on the morning of 1 November, Spee took his squadron out of Valparaíso, steaming at 14 knots (26 km/h; 16 mph) south toward Coronel. At around 16:00, Leipzig spotted the smoke column from the leading British cruiser. By 16:25, the other two ships had been spotted. The two squadrons slowly closed the distance, until the Germans opened fire at 18:34, at a range of 10,400 m (11,400 yd). The German ships engaged their opposite numbers, with Dresden firing on Otranto. After Dresden's third salvo, Otranto turned away; the Germans claimed a hit that caused a fire, though Otranto reported taking no damage. Following Otranto's departure, Dresden shifted her fire to Glasgow, which was also targeted by Leipzig. The two German cruisers hit their British opponent five times.

At around 19:30, Spee ordered Dresden and Leipzig to launch a torpedo attack against the damaged British armored cruisers. Dresden increased speed to position herself off the British bows, and briefly spotted Glasgow as she was withdrawing, but the British cruiser disappeared in the haze and gathering darkness. Dresden then encountered Leipzig; both ships initially thought the other was hostile. Dresden's crew was loading a torpedo when the two ships confirmed each other's identity. By 22:00, Dresden and the other two light cruisers were deployed in a line that searched unsuccessfully for the British cruisers. Dresden had emerged from the battle completely unscathed.

On 3 November, Spee took Scharnhorst, Gneisenau, and Nürnberg back to Valparaíso for provisioning and to consult with the Admiralstab. Neutrality laws permitted only three belligerent warships in a port at a given time. Dresden and Leipzig remained with the squadron's colliers in Más a Fuera. Spee returned to Más a Fuera on 6 November, and detached Dresden and Leipzig for a visit to Valparaíso, where they also restocked their supplies. The two cruisers arrived on 12 November, left the following day, and met the rest of the squadron at sea on 18 November. Three days later, the squadron anchored in St. Quentin Bay in the Gulf of Penas, where they coaled. The Royal Navy had deployed Vice Admiral Doveton Sturdee's pair of battlecruisers, Invincible and Inflexible, to hunt down the German squadron. They left Britain on 11 November, and arrived in the Falkland Islands on 7 December. There, they joined the armored cruisers Cornwall, Kent, and Carnarvon, and the light cruisers Glasgow and Bristol.

On 26 November, the German East Asia Squadron left St. Quentin Bay, bound for the Atlantic. On 2 December, they caught the Canadian sailing ship Drummuir, which was carrying 2,750 t (2,710 long tons) of high-grade Cardiff coal. The following morning, the Germans anchored off Picton Island, where they unloaded the coal from Drummuir into their own auxiliaries. On the morning of 6 December, Spee held a council aboard Scharnhorst to discuss their next moves. With the support of the captains of Scharnhorst and Gneisenau, he successfully argued for an attack on the Falklands to destroy the British wireless station and coal stocks there. Lüdecke and the captains of Leipzig and Nürnberg all opposed the plan, and were in favor of bypassing the Falklands and proceeding to the La Plata area to continue to raid British shipping.

==== Battle of the Falkland Islands ====

On the afternoon of 6 December, the German ships departed Picton Island, bound for the Falklands. On 7 December, they rounded Tierra del Fuego and turned north into the Atlantic. They arrived off the Falklands at around 02:00; three hours later, Spee detached Gneisenau and Nürnberg to land a party ashore. By 08:30, the ships were approaching Port Stanley, when they noticed thick columns of smoke rising from the harbor. After closing to the harbor entrance, they quickly realized they were confronted by a much more powerful squadron, which was just getting up steam. Spee immediately broke off the operation and turned east to flee before the British ships could catch his squadron. By 10:45, Gneisenau and Nürnberg had rejoined the fleet, and the German auxiliaries were detached to seek shelter in the maze of islands off Cape Horn.

The British ships set off in pursuit, and by 12:50, Sturdee's two battlecruisers had overtaken the Germans. A minute later, he gave the order to open fire at the trailing German ship, Leipzig. Spee ordered the three small cruisers to try to escape to the south, while he turned back with Scharnhorst and Gneisenau in an attempt to hold off the British squadron. Sturdee had foreseen this possibility, and so had ordered his armored and light cruisers to pursue the German light cruisers. The battlecruisers quickly overwhelmed Spee's armored cruisers, and destroyed them with heavy loss of life. Dresden, with her turbine engines, was able to outpace her pursuers, and was the only German warship to escape destruction. Lüdecke decided to take his ship into the islands off South America to keep a steady supply of coal available.

On 9 December, she passed back around Cape Horn to return to the Pacific. That day, she anchored in Sholl Bay, with only 160 t (157 long tons) of coal remaining. Oberleutnant zur See (lieutenant at sea) Wilhelm Canaris convinced the Chilean naval representative for the region to permit Dresden to remain in the area for an extra twenty-four hours so enough coal could be taken aboard to reach Punta Arenas. She arrived there on 12 December, and received 750 t (740 long tons) of coal from a German steamship. The Admiralstab hoped Dresden would be able to break through to the Atlantic and return to Germany, but the poor condition of her engines precluded this. Lüdecke instead decided to attempt to cross the Pacific via Easter Island, the Solomon Islands, and the Dutch East Indies and raid commerce in the Indian Ocean. Dresden took on another 1,600 t (1,575 long tons) of coal on 19 January. On 14 February, Dresden left the islands off the South American coast for the South Pacific. On 27 February, the cruiser captured the British barque Conway Castle south of Más a Tierra. From December to February, the German liner Sierra Cordoba had supplied Dresden and had accompanied her northward to a final coaling at Juan Fernández Islands just before the cruiser was scuttled.

On 8 March, Dresden was drifting in dense fog when lookouts spotted Kent, which also had her engines off, about 15 nautical miles (28 km; 17 mi) away. Both ships immediately raised steam, and Dresden escaped after a five-hour chase. The strenuous effort depleted her coal stocks and overtaxed her engines. Lüdecke decided his ship was no longer operational, and determined to have his ship interned to preserve it. The following morning, she put into Más a Fuera, dropping anchor in Cumberland Bay at 8:30. The following day, Lüdecke received by wireless the German Admiralty's permission to let Dresden be interned, and so Lüdecke informed the local Chilean official of his intention to do so.

==== Battle of Más a Tierra ====
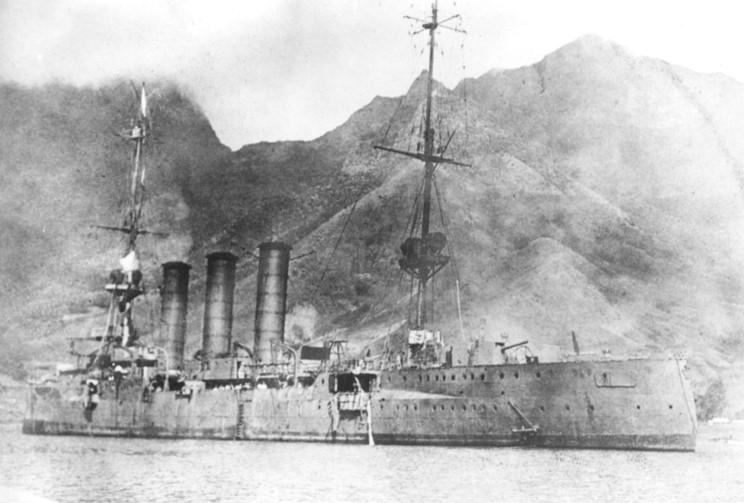
Dresden, flying a white flag, moments prior to her scuttling

On the morning of 14 March, Kent and Glasgow approached Cumberland Bay; their appearance was relayed back to Dresden by one of her pinnaces, which had been sent to patrol the entrance to the bay. Dresden was unable to maneuver, owing to her fuel shortage, and Lüdecke signaled that his ship was no longer a combatant. The British disregarded this message, as well as a Chilean vessel that approached them as they entered the bay. Glasgow opened fire, in violation of Chile's neutrality; Britain had already informed Chile that British warships would disregard international law if they located Dresden in Chilean territorial waters. Shortly thereafter, Kent joined in the bombardment as well. The German gunners fired off three shots in response, but the guns were quickly knocked out by British gunfire.

Lüdecke sent the signal "Am sending negotiator" to the British warships, and dispatched Canaris in a pinnace; Glasgow continued to bombard the defenseless cruiser. In another attempt to stop the attack, Lüdecke raised the white flag, which prompted Glasgow to cease fire. Canaris came aboard to speak with Captain John Luce; the former strongly protested the latter's violation of Chile's neutrality. Luce simply replied that he had his orders, and demanded an unconditional surrender. Canaris explained that Dresden had already been interned by Chile, and thereafter returned to his ship, which had in the meantime been prepared for scuttling.

At 10:45, the scuttling charge detonated in the bow and exploded the forward ammunition magazines. The bow was badly mangled; in about half an hour, the ship had taken on enough water to sink. As it struck the sea floor, the bow was torn from the rest of the ship, which rolled over to starboard. As the rest of the hull settled below the waves, a second scuttling charge exploded in the ship's engine rooms.

=== Aftermath ===
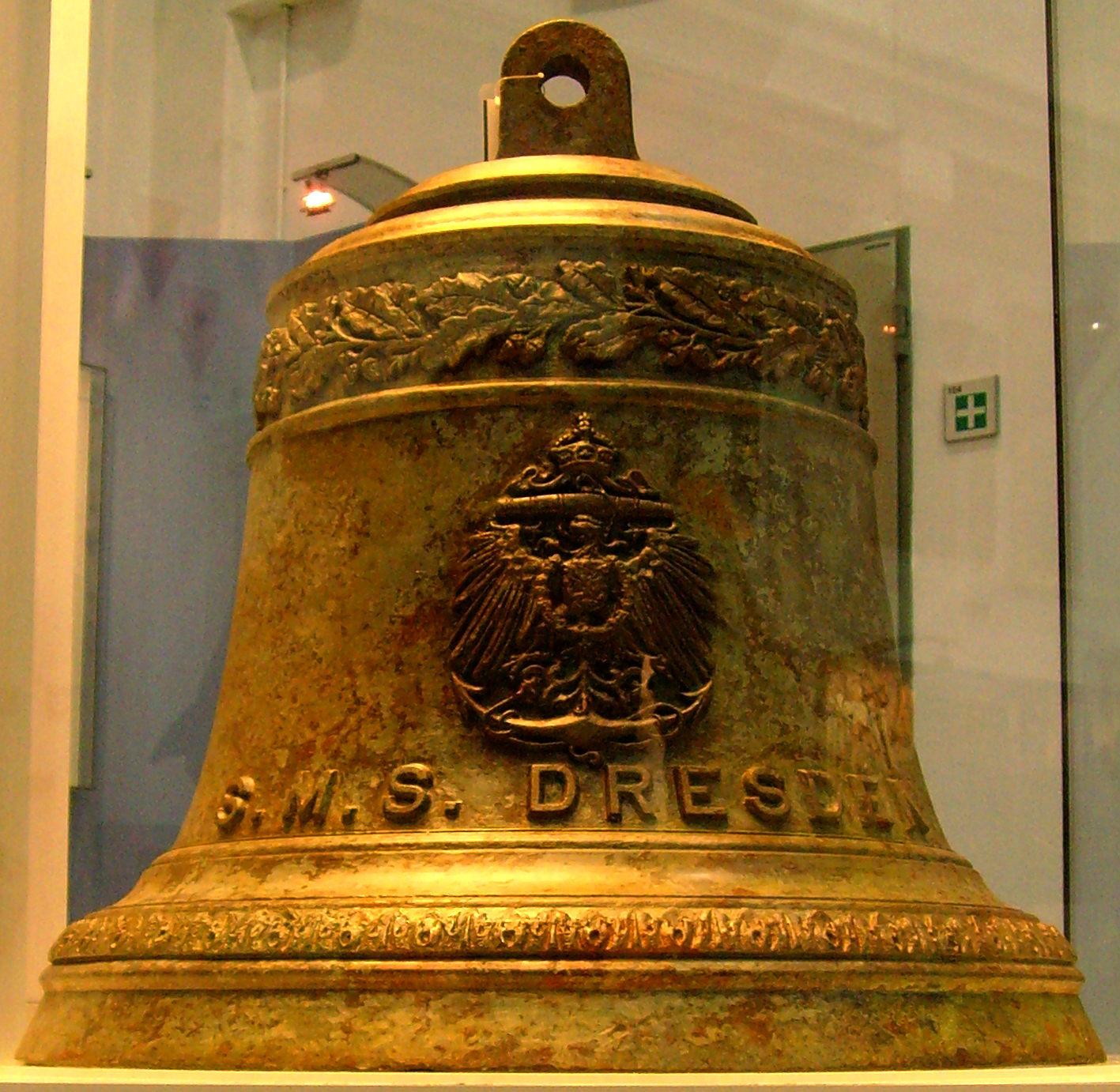
Dresden's bell, recovered from the wreck

Most of the ship's crew managed to escape; only eight men were killed in the attack, with another twenty-nine wounded. The British auxiliary cruiser HMS Orama took fifteen severely wounded men to Valparaíso; four of them died. The destruction of his ship had left Lüdecke in shock, and so Canaris took responsibility for the fate of the ship's crew. They remained on the island for five days until two Chilean warships brought a German passenger ship to take the men to Quiriquina Island, where they were interned for the duration of the war. Canaris escaped from the internment camp on 5 August 1915 and reached Germany exactly two months later. On 31 March 1917, a small group of men escaped on the Chilean barque Tinto; the voyage back to Germany lasted 120 days. The rest of the crew did not return to Germany until 1920.

The wreck lies at a depth of 70 meters (230 ft). In 2002, the first survey of the wreck was done by a team led by James P. Delgado for the Sea Hunters documentary produced by the National Underwater and Marine Agency. The team included the archaeologist Dr. Willi Kramer, the first German to visit the wreck since she sank 88 years before. Dresden lies on her starboard side pointed north, toward the beach. The wreck is heavily damaged; much of the upper works, including the bridge, the masts, the funnels, and many of the guns have been torn from the ship. The bow was cut off by the scuttling charges detonated by the ship's crew, and sits upright on the sea floor. The stern is also badly damaged, with the main deck blasted away and many shell holes in the ship's side. Some of the damage to the aft of the ship appears to have been done by an undocumented salvage operation before Delgado's survey. According to German records, Dresden was carrying gold coins from their colony at Qingdao; Delgado speculated that this salvage work was an attempt to retrieve these.

In 1965, the ship's compass and several flags were recovered and returned to Germany, where they are held at the German Naval Academy Mürwik in Flensburg-Mürwik. In 2006, Chilean and German divers found and recovered Dresden's bell, which is now in Germany. C. S. Forester's 1929 novel Brown on Resolution, and two subsequent movies, were inspired by the Dresden's escape and subsequent destruction.
