= St. Elizabeth's =

St. Elizabeth's may refer to:

- St. Elizabeth's Church (disambiguation)
- St. Elizabeth's F.C. Football club based in Dundonald, Northern Ireland
- St. Elizabeth's flood (disambiguation), two separate floods occurring in the 15th century Low Countries
- St. Elizabeths Hospital, Washington, D.C., United States, listed on the NRHP in Washington, D.C.
- St. Elizabeth's Medical Center (Boston), Massachusetts, United States

== See also ==
- Saint Elizabeth (disambiguation)
