= Isabela Island =

Isabela Island may refer to:

- Isabela Island (Galápagos)
- Isabela Island (Philippines)

== See also ==
- Isabel Island (disambiguation)
