= Point Isabel =

Point Isabel may refer to several places in the United States:

- Point Isabel (promontory), on the eastern shore of San Francisco Bay, California
- Point Isabel Regional Shoreline, a multi-use park in Richmond, California
- Point Isabel, Indiana, an unincorporated community
- Point Isabel, Kentucky, now Burnside
- Point Isabel, Ohio, an unincorporated community
- Port Isabel, Texas, a city
  - Point Isabel Light, a lighthouse
  - Point Isabel Independent School District
- Point Isabel, Virginia, or Robley, an unincorporated community

== See also ==
- Port Isabel (disambiguation)
- Isabel (disambiguation)
- Point (disambiguation)
