= Saint Elizabeth =

Saint Elizabeth or Saint Elisabeth may refer to

== People ==
- Elizabeth, mother of John the Baptist, a biblical figure

=== Eastern Orthodox ===
- Princess Elisabeth of Hesse and by Rhine (1864–1918), Russian princess and new martyr
- Elizabeth of Pasărea (1970–2014), Romanian schemanun

=== Roman Catholic ===
- Elisabeth of Schönau (1129–1164), German Benedictine visionary
- Elizabeth of Hungary (1207–1231), Hungarian princess
- Elizabeth of Portugal (1271–1336), queen consort of Portugal
- Elizabeth Ann Seton (1774–1821), American educator
- Elizabeth of the Trinity (1880–1906), French Carmelite nun

== Places ==
- St. Elizabeth, Missouri, a village in the US
- Saint Elizabeth Catholic Church, North Carolina, in the US
- Saint Elizabeth Parish, Jamaica
- St. Elizabeth Medical Center (disambiguation)

== See also ==
- Elizabeth (given name) § Saints
- St. Elizabeth High School (disambiguation)
- St. Elizabeth's (disambiguation)
- St. Elizabeth's Church (disambiguation)
- St. Elizabeths Hospital (note the lack of an apostrophe), District of Columbia
- Santa Isabel (disambiguation), the Portuguese and Spanish forms of the same name
