= Isabelita =

Isabelita is the diminutive of the name Isabel. It may refer to:

- Isabelita (film), a 1940 Argentine comedy film directed by Manuel Romero
- Isabel Perón, President of Argentina and the third wife of Juan Perón, commonly known by the diminutive "Isabelita"
- Isabelita Blanch, Argentine actress

== See also ==
- Isabel (disambiguation)
