= Dresden-class cruiser =

Class of German light cruisers

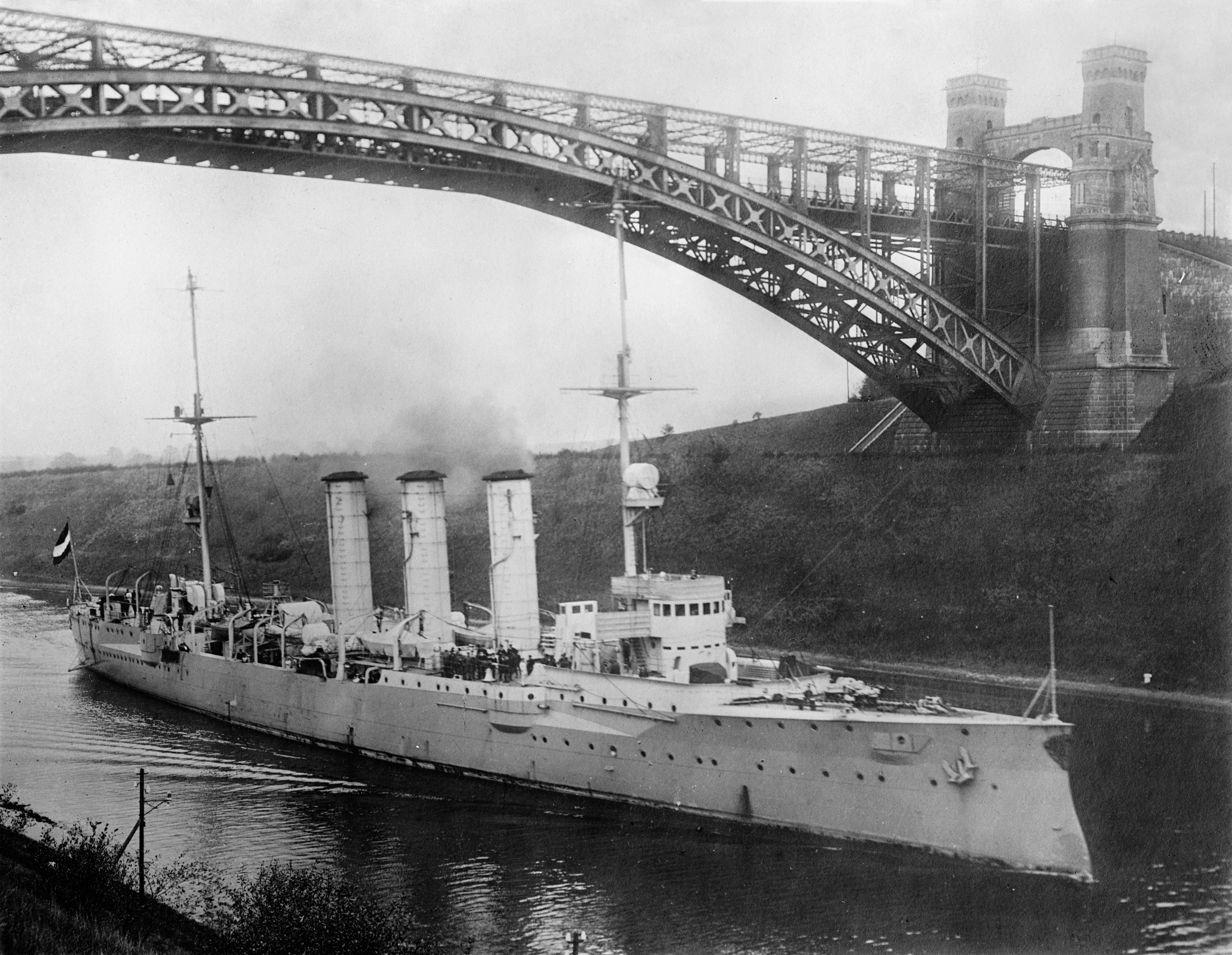
- SMS Dresden transiting the Kaiser Wilhelm Canal

Class overview
- Builders: Blohm & Voss and Kaiserliche Werft Danzig
- Operators: Imperial German Navy
- Preceded by: Königsberg class
- Succeeded by: Kolberg class
- Built: 1906–1909
- In service: 1908–1915
- Completed: 2
- Lost: 2

General characteristics
- Type: Light cruiser
- Displacement: Normal: 3,664 t (3,606 long tons); Full load: 4,268 t (4,201 long tons)
- Length: 118.30 m (388 ft 1 in)
- Beam: 13.50 m (44 ft 3 in)
- Draft: 5.53 m (18 ft 2 in)
- Installed power: Dresden: 12 × water-tube boilers; 15,000 shp (11,000 kW); Emden: 12 × water-tube boilers; 13,500 ihp (10,100 kW)
- Propulsion: Dresden: 4 × screw propellers; 2 × steam turbines; Emden: 2 × screw propellers; 2 × triple expansion engines
- Speed: 24 knots (44 km/h; 28 mph)
- Complement: 18 officers; 343 enlisted men
- Armament: 10 × 10.5 cm (4 in) SK L/40 guns; 8 × 5.2 cm (2 in) SK L/55 guns; 2 × 45 cm (17.7 in) torpedo tubes
- Armor: Deck: 80 mm (3 in); Conning tower: 100 mm (4 in); Gun shields: 50 mm (2 in)

The Dresden class was a pair of light cruisers built for the Imperial German Navy in the early part of the 20th century. The class comprised SMS Dresden, the lead ship, and SMS Emden. Both ships were laid down in 1906; Dresden was launched in 1907, and Emden followed in 1908. They entered service in 1908 and 1909, respectively. The design for the ships was an incremental improvement over the preceding Königsberg class, being slightly larger and slightly faster, but with the same primary armament of ten 10.5 cm (4.1 in) guns. Dresden and Emden were powered by steam turbines and triple expansion engines, respectively, as part of continued experiments with the new turbine technology.

Both ships served extensively on foreign stations; Emden was assigned to the East Asia Squadron from her commissioning, and Dresden was sent to Caribbean waters in 1913. Dresden was due to return to Germany for periodic maintenance shortly before the outbreak of World War I in August 1914, but this became impossible with the onset of hostilities. She therefore operated as a commerce raider, before linking up with Vizeadmiral Maximilian von Spee's East Asia Squadron. Dresden thereafter participated in the Battle of Coronel in November 1914 and the Battle of the Falkland Islands the following December. She was the only German vessel to escape destruction at the latter engagement, and she remained at large for several more months. Dresden finally put into the Chilean island of Más a Tierra in March 1915 owing to worn-out engines. A pair of British cruisers violated Chilean neutrality and attacked Dresden while she lay at anchor; the Germans scuttled their ship to prevent her capture.

Emden, meanwhile, had been detached from the East Asia Squadron to pursue an independent commerce raiding campaign in the Indian Ocean. She captured or sank numerous Entente vessels, including the steamer Ryazan which was converted into the auxiliary cruiser SMS Cormoran. In September 1914, Emden raided Penang and caught the Russian protected cruiser Zhemchug and the French destroyer Mousquet and quickly destroyed both ships. Shortly thereafter, Emden was caught by the Australian cruiser HMAS Sydney off the Cocos Islands and forced to beach after a ferocious engagement.

== Design ==
The 1898 Naval Law authorized the construction of thirty new light cruisers; the program began with the Gazelle class, which was developed into the Bremen and Königsberg classes, both of which incorporated incremental improvements over the course of construction. The two ships of the Dresden class were ordered in the 1905–1906 construction program. Their design represented an incremental improvement over the earlier Königsberg class. They carried the same main battery of 10.5 cm (4.1 in) guns on a slightly greater displacement with an additional boiler for the propulsion system to increase engine power. Like the Königsbergs, one ship—Dresden—was fitted with a steam turbine engine to compare its performance with the traditional triple-expansion engine in an otherwise-identical sister ship. All subsequent designs of German cruisers used turbine propulsion systems.

=== General characteristics and machinery ===
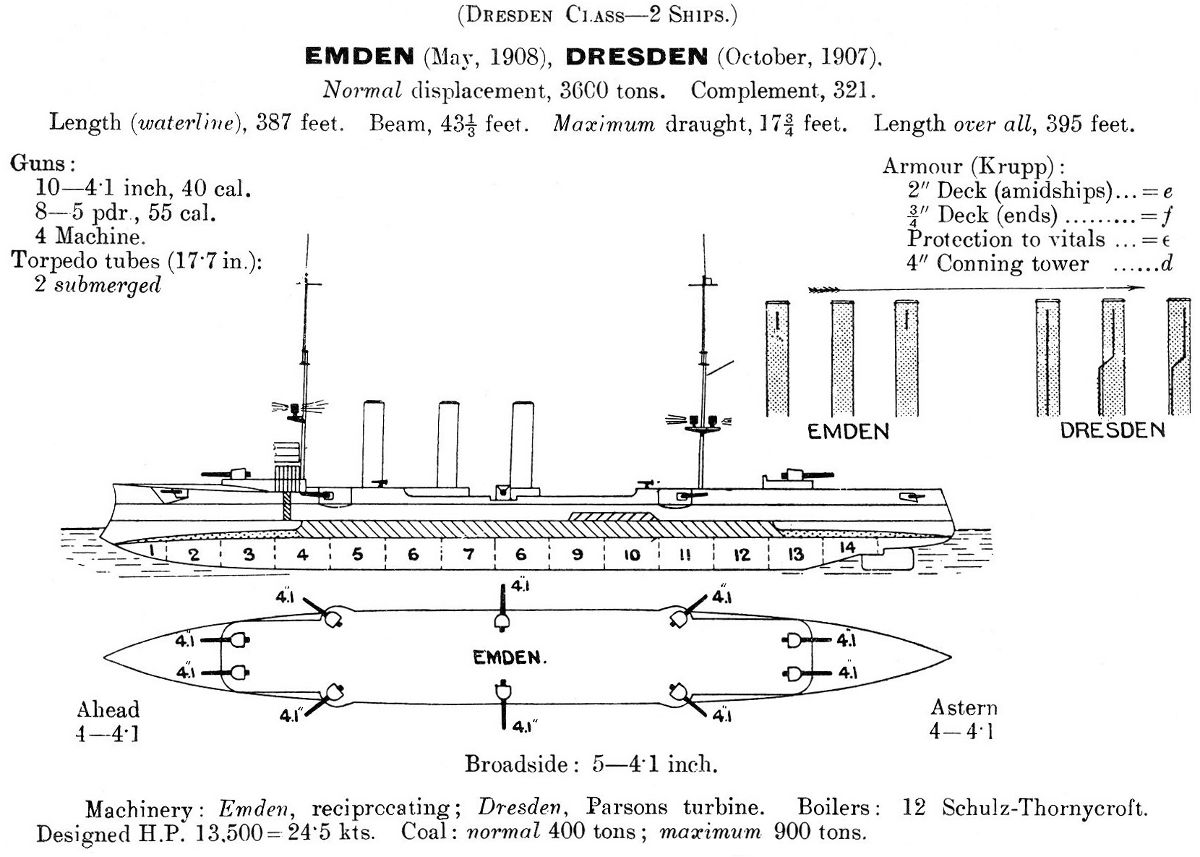
Left elevation and deck plan as depicted in Jane's Fighting Ships 1914

The two Dresden-class cruisers were 117.90 meters (386 ft 10 in) long at the waterline and 118.30 m (388 ft 1 in) long overall. They had a beam of 13.50 m (44 ft 3 in) and a draft of 5.53 m (18 ft 2 in) forward. They displaced 3,664 metric tons (3,606 long tons) as designed and up to 4,268 t (4,201 long tons; 4,705 short tons) at full load. Their hulls were constructed with transverse and longitudinal steel frames. The hulls contained thirteen watertight compartments and had a double bottom that extended for 47 percent of the length of the keel.

The ships were good sea boats, but they were crank and rolled up to twenty degrees. They were also very wet at high speeds and suffered from a slight weather helm. Nevertheless, the ships turned tightly and were very maneuverable. In a hard turn, their speed fell up to 35 percent. They had a transverse metacentric height of .59 m (1 ft 11 in). Dresden and Emden had a crew of 18 officers and 343 enlisted men. They carried a number of smaller boats, including one picket boat, one barge, one cutter, two yawls, and two dinghies.

Dresden's propulsion system consisted of two sets of Parsons steam turbines, designed to give 15,000 shaft horsepower (11,000 kW). Emden, instead, was equipped with two triple expansion engines rated at 13,500 indicated horsepower (10,100 kW). Both ships had a top speed of 24 knots (44 km/h; 28 mph). In both vessels, the engines were powered by twelve coal-fired Marine-type water-tube boilers. Both ships carried up to 860 metric tons (850 long tons) of coal, though their ranges were slightly different, owing to their different propulsion systems. Dresden could steam for 3,600 nautical miles (6,700 km; 4,100 mi) at 14 knots (26 km/h; 16 mph), while Emden had a range of 3,760 nmi (6,960 km; 4,330 mi) at 12 knots (22 km/h; 14 mph). Electrical power was supplied by three turbo generators that provided a total of 125 kilowatts at 110 volts.

=== Armament and armor ===
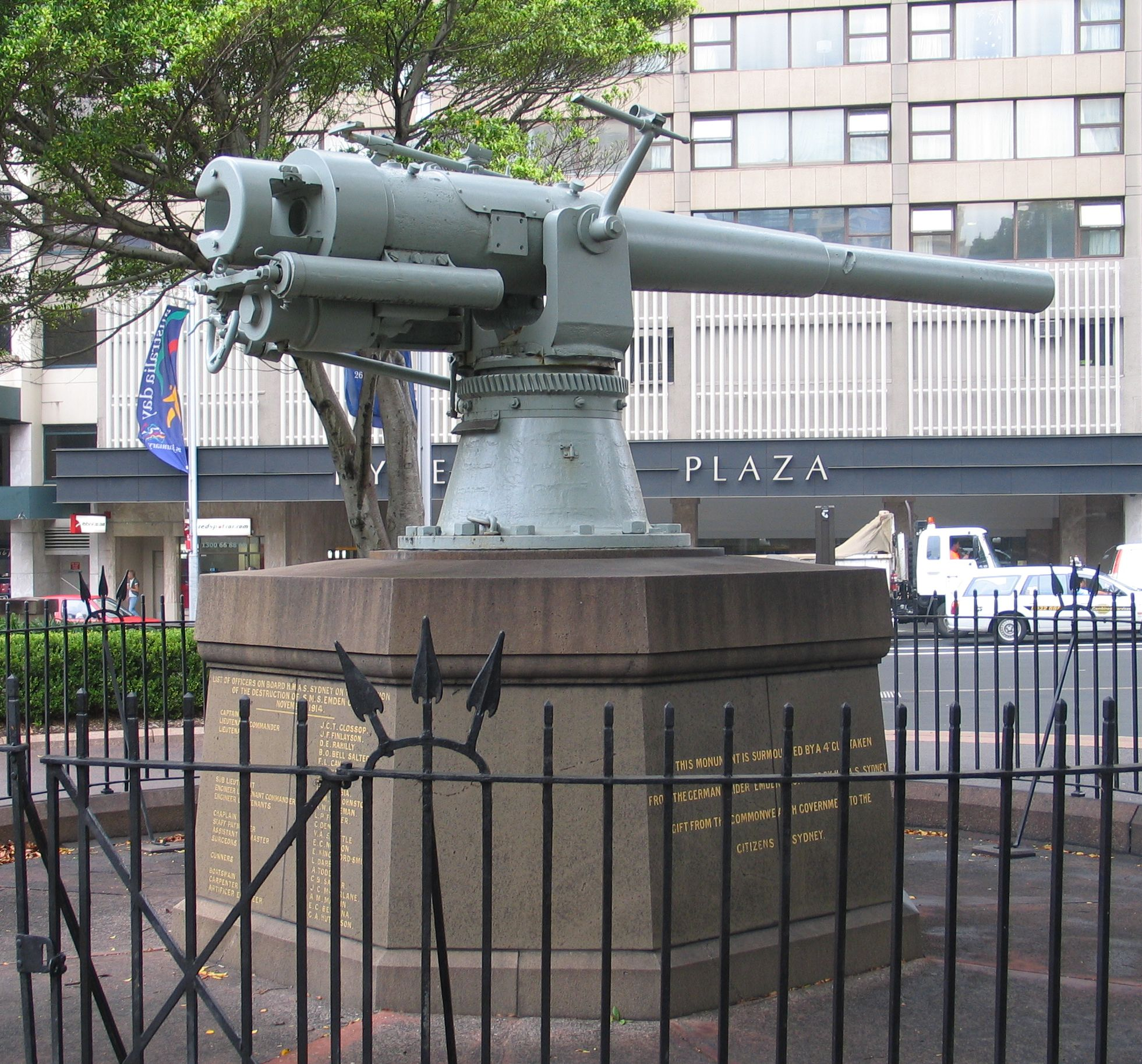
One of Emden's 10.5 cm guns, preserved in Sydney, Australia

The ships were armed with ten 10.5 cm (4.1 in) SK L/40 guns in single pedestal mounts. Two were placed side by side forward on the forecastle, six were located amidships, three on either side, and two were side by side aft. The guns had a maximum elevation of 30 degrees, which allowed them to engage targets out to 12,700 m (13,900 yd). They were supplied with 1,500 rounds of ammunition, for 150 shells per gun. The ships were also equipped with eight 5.2 cm (2 in) SK L/55 guns with 4,000 rounds of ammunition. Both ships were also equipped with a pair of 45 cm (17.7 in) torpedo tubes with five torpedoes submerged in the hull on the broadside.

The ships were protected by an armored deck that was up to 80 mm (3.1 in) thick amidships with 50 mm (2 in) thick sloping armor on the sides. The deck was reduced to 30 mm (1.2 in) further aft and then again to 20 mm (0.79 in) toward the stern. The conning tower had 100 mm (3.9 in) thick sides, and the guns were protected by 50 mm thick shields.

== Construction ==
Construction data
Name	Builder	Laid down	Launched	Commissioned
Dresden	Blohm & Voss, Hamburg	1906	5 October 1907	14 November 1908
Emden	Kaiserliche Werft, Danzig	6 April 1906	26 May 1908	10 July 1909

== Service history ==
=== Dresden ===
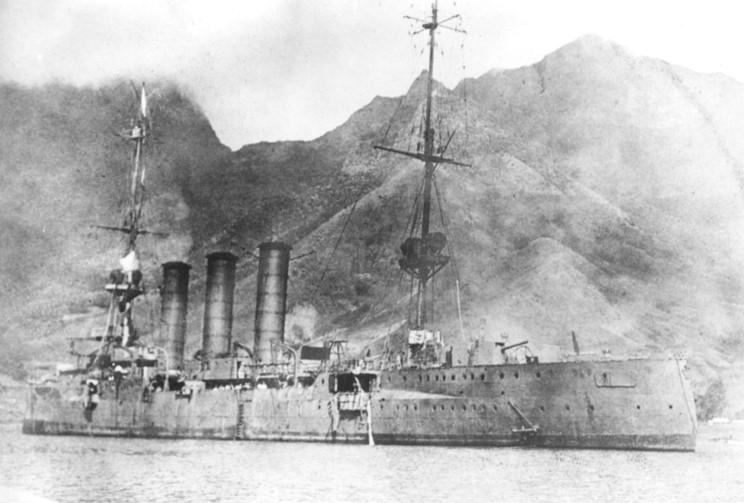
Dresden, flying a white flag, moments prior to her scuttling

Dresden spent most of her career on foreign stations. After her commissioning, she visited the United States in 1909 as part of Germany's delegation to the Hudson–Fulton Celebration. She returned to North American waters in late 1913, when she was stationed off the Mexican coast to protect German nationals during the Mexican Revolution. Following the rebels' victory the following year, Dresden evacuated the former dictator Victoriano Huerta to Jamaica, where the British had granted him asylum. In need of repairs, the cruiser was scheduled to return to Germany in July 1914, but the outbreak of World War I prevented this from taking place. Instead, Dresden operated as a commerce raider in South American waters in the Atlantic in the first months of the war before moving to the Pacific Ocean in September and thereafter joining Maximilian von Spee's East Asia Squadron.

Dresden participated in two major battles with the East Asia Squadron. The first, the Battle of Coronel, took place in November, and Dresden engaged the British cruiser HMS Glasgow. The second, the Battle of the Falkland Islands, followed in December, where British battlecruisers annihilated the German squadron; Dresden was the only vessel to escape. She eluded her British pursuers for several more months, until she put into Más a Tierra in March 1915. Her engines were worn out and she had almost no coal left for her boilers; the ship's captain contacted the local Chilean authorities to have his vessel interned for the duration of the conflict. There, she was trapped by British cruisers, including her old opponent Glasgow; the British violated Chilean neutrality and opened fire on the ship. The Germans scuttled Dresden and the majority of the crew escaped to be interned in Chile for the duration of the war. The wreck remains in the harbor and was first surveyed in 2002.

=== Emden ===
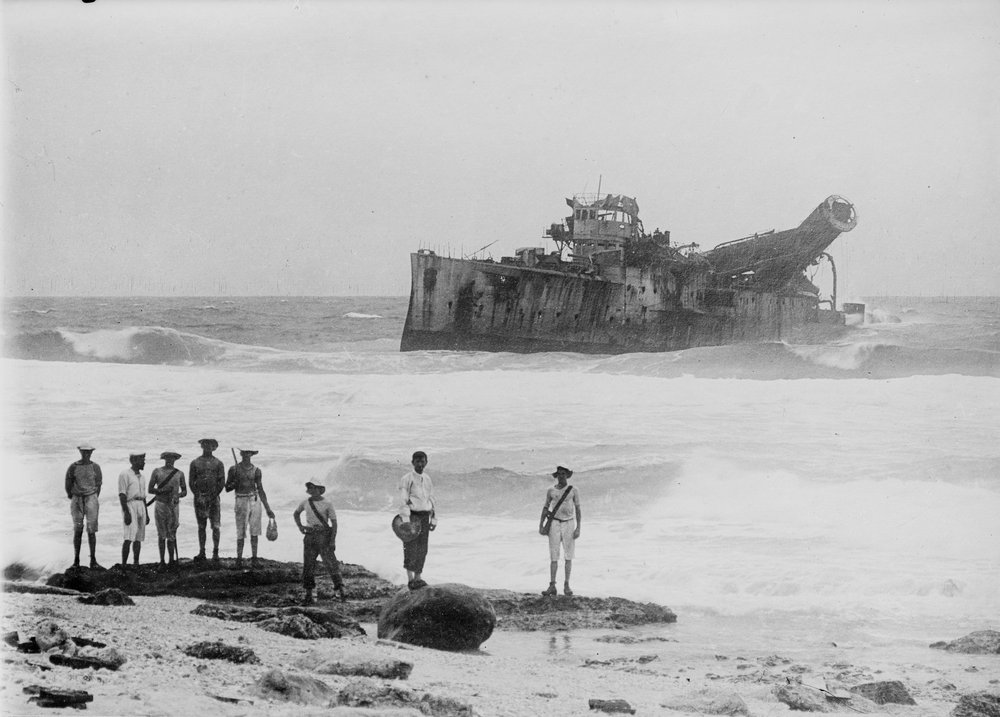
Emden's wreck after the battle

Following her commissioning into the fleet, Emden was assigned to the East Asia Squadron. In 1913, Korvettenkapitän (Corvette Captain) Karl von Müller became the ship's commander. At the outbreak of war, Emden was the only major German warship in Qingdao, the main German naval base in Asia. Müller immediately began to operate as a commerce raider, and captured one ship, the Russian steamer Ryazan. Emden was thereafter ordered to rendezvous with the rest of Spee's cruisers. She remained with the East Asia Squadron for only a few days, as Müller convinced Spee to detach Emden as an independent raider in the Indian Ocean.

After arriving in the Indian Ocean in September, Emden captured several British merchantmen along the sea lanes from India to Aden. On 22 September, the ship bombarded Madras, before resuming the hunt for merchant ships. She captured several more vessels, and then raided the port of Penang. There, Emden caught the Russian protected cruiser Zhemchug in the harbor and quickly destroyed her. As Emden was departing, she encountered and sank the French destroyer Mousquet. Emden thereafter proceeded to the Cocos Islands, where Müller intended to destroy a wireless station. The Australian cruiser HMAS Sydney reacted to British wireless signals warning of the Germans' presence. After a fierce gunnery duel, Sydney caused serious damage to Emden and forced her to beach on North Keeling island. Most of her surviving crew, including Müller, were thereafter taken into captivity. The wreck was eventually broken up in situ in the early 1950s by a Japanese salvage company, though parts of the ship remain scattered around the area.
