= Santa Isabel =

Saint or Santa Isabel, Isabela, or Isabella (Spanish and Portuguese for "Saint Elizabeth") may refer to:

== People ==
- Elizabeth of Portugal
- Saint Isabelle of France

== Places ==
=== Argentina ===
- Santa Isabel, Buenos Aires, a settlement in General Alvear Partido
- Santa Isabel, Córdoba, a neighbourhood in the city of Córdoba
- Santa Isabel, La Pampa, in the province of La Pampa

=== Brazil ===
- Santa Isabel, Espírito Santo, a town in the state of Espírito Santo
- Santa Isabel, Goiás, a town in the state of Goiás
- Santa Isabel, São Paulo, a town in the state of São Paulo
- Santa Isabel do Rio Negro, in the state of Amazonas
- Vila Santa Isabel, a neighborhood in Carrão (district of São Paulo)

=== Cape Verde ===
- Santa Isabel (Boa Vista), a parish on the island of Boa Vista and the eponymous church in Sal Rei city

=== Colombia ===
- Santa Isabel (Bogotá), a barrio (neighborhood) in Bogotá
- Santa Isabel, Tolima, a town in Tolima department
- Santa Isabel (TransMilenio), a station on Bogotá's TransMilenio mass-transit system
- Santa Isabel (volcano), a volcano

=== Cuba ===
- Santa Isabel de las Lajas, historical and cultural name of the city of Lajas, Cuba

=== Ecuador ===
- Santa Isabela Island, former name of Isabela Island in the Galapagos

=== Equatorial Guinea ===
- Former name of Malabo, the country's capital
- Former name of Pico Basilé, highest mountain in Equatorial Guinea

=== Mexico ===
- Santa Isabel, Baja California, a city in the state of Baja California
- Santa Isabel, Chihuahua, a city in the state of Chihuahua
- Santa Isabel Municipality, also in Chihuahua
- Santa Isabel Cholula, in the state of Puebla

=== Panama ===
- Santa Isabel, Colón, a corregimiento (district subdivision) in Santa Isabel District

=== Philippines ===
- Santa Isabel, San Pablo, a barangay (administrative district) of San Pablo, Laguna Province

=== Portugal ===
- Santa Isabel (Lisbon), a former parish, extant from 1741–2012

=== Solomon Islands ===
- Santa Isabel Island, an island in the South Pacific

=== United States ===
- Santa Isabel de Utinahica, a former Spanish mission in the state of Georgia

=== Puerto Rico ===
- Santa Isabel, Puerto Rico, a municipality located on the southern coast

=== Venezuela ===
- Santa Isabel, Trujillo, the shire town of municipality Andrés Bello in Trujillo (state)

== Other ==
- Santa Isabel languages, spoken in the Solomon Islands
- Santa Isabel Theater, in Recife, Brazil
- Santa Isabel (supermarkets) of Chile
- Santa Isabel (church) in Lisbon, Portugal
- SS Santa Isabel, a number of ships with this name

== See also ==
- Saint Elizabeth (disambiguation)
