= Laguna Vista, Texas =

- Town
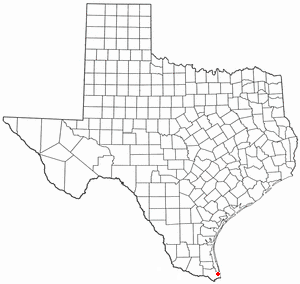
- Location of Laguna Vista, Texas

- Coordinates: 26°6′12″N 97°17′46″W
- Country: United States
- State: Texas
- County: Cameron

Area
  - Total: 4.95 sq mi (12.82 km^{2})
  - Land: 4.83 sq mi (12.50 km^{2})
  - Water: 0.12 sq mi (0.31 km^{2})
- Elevation: 9.8 ft (3 m)

Population (2020)
  - Total: 3,520
  - Density: 729/sq mi (282/km^{2})
- Time zone: UTC-6 (Central (CST))
  - Summer (DST): UTC-5 (CDT)
- ZIP code: 78578
- Area code: 956
- FIPS code: 48-40336
- GNIS feature ID: 1374437
- Website: https://www.lvtexas.us/

Laguna Vista is a town in Cameron County, Texas, United States. The population was 3,520 at the 2020 census. It is included as part of the Brownsville–Harlingen–Raymondville and the Matamoros–Brownsville metropolitan areas.

== Geography ==
Laguna Vista is located at 26°6′12″N 97°17′46″W (26.103381, –97.296053).

According to the United States Census Bureau, the town has a total area of 2.2 square miles (5.7 km^{2}), all land.

=== Climate ===
Laguna Vista has a humid subtropical climate (Köppen: Cfa). The all time record high of 103 °F (39 °C) was recorded on September 8th and 9th, 2002, while the all time record low of 17 °F (-8 °C) was recorded on December 23rd, 1962.

Climate data for Laguna Vista, Texas (1991–2020 normals, extremes 1928–1969, 1975–2014, 2020–present)
| Month | Jan | Feb | Mar | Apr | May | Jun | Jul | Aug | Sep | Oct | Nov | Dec | Year |
|---|---|---|---|---|---|---|---|---|---|---|---|---|---|
| Record high °F (°C) | 89 (32) | 91 (33) | 100 (38) | 98 (37) | 98 (37) | 101 (38) | 99 (37) | 101 (38) | 103 (39) | 96 (36) | 95 (35) | 90 (32) | 103 (39) |
| Mean maximum °F (°C) | 81.1 (27.3) | 83.6 (28.7) | 87.1 (30.6) | 89.3 (31.8) | 91.8 (33.2) | 93.8 (34.3) | 95.1 (35.1) | 95.5 (35.3) | 95.0 (35.0) | 91.3 (32.9) | 86.3 (30.2) | 82.7 (28.2) | 97.4 (36.3) |
| Mean daily maximum °F (°C) | 68.9 (20.5) | 72.2 (22.3) | 75.7 (24.3) | 80.8 (27.1) | 86.1 (30.1) | 90.1 (32.3) | 91.0 (32.8) | 92.1 (33.4) | 88.5 (31.4) | 85.1 (29.5) | 77.5 (25.3) | 70.5 (21.4) | 81.5 (27.5) |
| Daily mean °F (°C) | 60.3 (15.7) | 64.2 (17.9) | 68.4 (20.2) | 73.9 (23.3) | 79.4 (26.3) | 83.2 (28.4) | 84.0 (28.9) | 84.5 (29.2) | 81.2 (27.3) | 77.0 (25.0) | 69.1 (20.6) | 62.1 (16.7) | 73.9 (23.3) |
| Mean daily minimum °F (°C) | 51.7 (10.9) | 56.3 (13.5) | 61.2 (16.2) | 67.0 (19.4) | 72.7 (22.6) | 76.3 (24.6) | 77.0 (25.0) | 77.0 (25.0) | 73.9 (23.3) | 69.0 (20.6) | 60.7 (15.9) | 53.6 (12.0) | 66.4 (19.1) |
| Mean minimum °F (°C) | 38.2 (3.4) | 41.2 (5.1) | 44.7 (7.1) | 54.3 (12.4) | 63.6 (17.6) | 72.3 (22.4) | 73.2 (22.9) | 73.4 (23.0) | 66.6 (19.2) | 54.2 (12.3) | 44.7 (7.1) | 37.1 (2.8) | 34.3 (1.3) |
| Record low °F (°C) | 22 (−6) | 23 (−5) | 31 (−1) | 37 (3) | 52 (11) | 62 (17) | 67 (19) | 67 (19) | 55 (13) | 37 (3) | 29 (−2) | 17 (−8) | 17 (−8) |
| Average precipitation inches (mm) | 1.45 (37) | 1.22 (31) | 1.68 (43) | 1.59 (40) | 2.36 (60) | 3.06 (78) | 2.27 (58) | 1.93 (49) | 6.15 (156) | 3.86 (98) | 1.77 (45) | 1.41 (36) | 28.75 (730) |
| Average snowfall inches (cm) | 0.0 (0.0) | 0.0 (0.0) | 0.0 (0.0) | 0.0 (0.0) | 0.0 (0.0) | 0.0 (0.0) | 0.0 (0.0) | 0.0 (0.0) | 0.0 (0.0) | 0.0 (0.0) | 0.0 (0.0) | 0.2 (0.51) | 0.2 (0.51) |
| Average precipitation days (≥ 0.01 in) | 7.9 | 5.2 | 4.8 | 3.6 | 4.0 | 4.0 | 3.6 | 4.4 | 8.3 | 7.3 | 5.8 | 7.7 | 66.6 |
| Average snowy days (≥ 0.1 in) | 0.0 | 0.0 | 0.0 | 0.0 | 0.0 | 0.0 | 0.0 | 0.0 | 0.0 | 0.0 | 0.0 | 0.0 | 0.0 |
Source: NOAA

== Demographics ==
Historical population
| Census | Pop. | Note | %± |
|---|---|---|---|
| 1960 | 141 | | — |
| 1970 | 287 | | 103.5% |
| 1980 | 632 | | 120.2% |
| 1990 | 1,166 | | 84.5% |
| 2000 | 1,658 | | 42.2% |
| 2010 | 3,117 | | 88.0% |
| 2020 | 3,520 | | 12.9% |
U.S. Decennial Census

=== 2020 census ===
As of the 2020 census, Laguna Vista had a population of 3,520. The median age was 53.9 years. 18.3% of residents were under the age of 18 and 31.6% of residents were 65 years of age or older. For every 100 females there were 96.5 males, and for every 100 females age 18 and over there were 93.5 males age 18 and over.

99.7% of residents lived in urban areas, while 0.3% lived in rural areas.

There were 1,494 households in Laguna Vista, including 965 families, of which 25.5% had children under the age of 18 living in them. Of all households, 56.6% were married-couple households, 15.5% were households with a male householder and no spouse or partner present, and 22.8% were households with a female householder and no spouse or partner present. About 22.6% of all households were made up of individuals, and 12.1% had someone living alone who was 65 years of age or older.

There were 1,869 housing units, of which 20.1% were vacant. The homeowner vacancy rate was 3.8% and the rental vacancy rate was 18.4%.

Laguna Vista racial composition (NH = Non-Hispanic) (Note: Note: the US Census treats Hispanic/Latino as an ethnic category. This table excludes Latinos from the racial categories and assigns them to a separate category. Hispanics/Latinos can be of any race.)
| Race | Number | Percentage |
|---|---|---|
| White (NH) | 1,716 | 48.75% |
| Black or African American (NH) | 14 | 0.4% |
| Native American or Alaska Native (NH) | 10 | 0.28% |
| Asian (NH) | 27 | 0.77% |
| Some Other Race (NH) | 12 | 0.34% |
| Mixed/Multi-Racial (NH) | 61 | 1.73% |
| Hispanic or Latino | 1,680 | 47.73% |
| Total | 3,520 | |

=== 2000 census ===
At the 2000 census there were 1,658 people, 579 households, and 471 families in the town. The population density was 760.1 inhabitants per square mile (293.5/km^{2}). There were 695 housing units at an average density of 318.6 per square mile (123.0/km^{2}). The racial makeup of the town was 84.08% White, 0.30% African American, 0.30% Native American, 0.60% Asian, 12.12% from other races, and 2.59% from two or more races. Hispanic or Latino of any race were 49.22%.

Of the 579 households 44.6% had children under the age of 18 living with them, 66.1% were married couples living together, 12.4% had a female householder with no husband present, and 18.5% were non-families. 16.8% of households were one person and 5.9% were one person aged 65 or older. The average household size was 2.86 and the average family size was 3.22.

The age distribution was 30.6% under the age of 18, 8.1% from 18 to 24, 27.9% from 25 to 44, 24.4% from 45 to 64, and 9.0% 65 or older. The median age was 33 years. For every 100 females, there were 89.7 males. For every 100 females age 18 and over, there were 84.5 males.

The median income for a household in the town was $43,641, and the median family income was $48,304. Males had a median income of $35,625 versus $28,403 for females. The per capita income for the town was $19,924. About 9.3% of families and 10.8% of the population were below the poverty line, including 15.6% of those under age 18 and 4.1% of those age 65 or over.

== Education ==
Children living in Laguna Vista are zoned to schools in Point Isabel Independent School District. Children go to Derry Elementary School, (PK–5), Port Isabel Junior High School (6–8), and Port Isabel High School (9–12). All of the schools are in Port Isabel.

In addition, South Texas Independent School District operates magnet schools that serve Laguna Vista and many surrounding communities.
