= Isobel (disambiguation) =

Isobel is the Scottish variant of Isabel, a feminine given name.

Isobel may also refer to:

== Music ==
- "Isobel" (song), by Björk from the album Post
- "Isobel", by Dido from her album No Angel

== Film and television ==
- Isobel (film), also known as The Trail's End, a 1920 film directed by Edwin Carewe, from the novel by James Oliver Curwood
- "Isobel" (The Vampire Diaries), an episode of the TV series The Vampire Diaries

== Other uses ==
- Isobel, a contour line in mapping of environmental noise, connecting points of equal sound pressure
- Isobel (HBC vessel), operated by the HBC from 1850 to 1857, see Hudson's Bay Company vessels
- Isobel: A Romance of the Northern Trail, 1913 novel by James Oliver Curwood

== See also ==
- Isabel (disambiguation)
- Cyclone Isobel (disambiguation), four cyclones in the southern hemisphere
