= Isabel Island =

Isabel Island may refer to:

- Isabel Island (Chile)
- Isabel Island (Philippines)

== See also ==
- Isabela Island (disambiguation)
- Isla Isabel National Park, Mexico
- Santa Isabel Island, Solomon Islands
