= St. Elizabeth's Church =

St. Elizabeth's or St. Elisabeth's Church may refer to:

== United States ==
(by U.S. state)

- St. Elizabeth's Catholic Church (De Valls Bluff, Arkansas)
- St. Elizabeth's Church (Denver, Colorado)
- St. Elizabeth's Catholic Church (Louisville, Kentucky)
- St. Elizabeth of Hungary Catholic Church (Baltimore, Maryland)
- Saint Elizabeth's Church (Tecumseh, Michigan)
- St. Elizabeth's Church (Manhattan), New York
- St. Elizabeth of Hungary Church (New York City), New York
- St. Elizabeth's Memorial Chapel, Tuxedo, New York
- Saint Elizabeth of the Hill Country Catholic Church, Boone, North Carolina
- St. Elizabeth of Hungary Catholic Church (Cleveland, Ohio)
- St. Elizabeth's Convent, Cornwells Heights, Pennsylvania

== Europe ==
- St Elizabeth's Church, Ashley, England
- St Elisabeth's Church, Reddish, England
- St. Elizabeth's Church, Marburg, Germany
- St. Elizabeth's Church, Wiesbaden, Germany
- Herzogspitalkirche (St. Elisabeth Hospital), Munich, Germany
- St. Elizabeth's , Dundonald, Northern Ireland
- Elisabethenkirche, Basel, Switzerland
- St. Elizabeth's Church, Wrocław, Poland
- St. Elisabeth's Church, Königsberg, Prussia
- St. Elizabeth's Cathedral, Košice, Slovakia
- Blue Church (Church of St. Elizabeth), Bratislava, Slovakia

== Other places ==
- Isabela Cathedral, Basilan, Phulippines
- Santa Isabel, Paso de los Toros, Uruguay

== See also ==
- St. Elizabeth's (disambiguation)
- Saint Elizabeth (disambiguation)
