= St. Elizabeth High School =

St. Elizabeth High School may refer to:

- St. Elizabeth High School (Oakland, California) — Oakland, California
- St. Elizabeth High School (Wilmington, Delaware) — Wilmington, Delaware
- St. Elizabeth Catholic High School — Thornhill, Ontario
- St. Elizabeth Secondary School — Karen, Nairobi
- St. Elizabeth Secondary School, Sibu, Sarawak
