= Carlota Island =

Inhabited island in the Philippines

- Location within Philippines

Geography
- Coordinates: 13°1′31″N 121°53′11″E
- Archipelago: Romblon Group of Islands
- Adjacent to: Sibuyan Sea

Administration
- Philippines
- Region: Mimaropa
- Province: Romblon
- Municipality: Banton

Additional information

Carlota Island is an inhabited volcanic island in the province of Romblon in the Philippines. It is part of barangay Nasunogan in the municipality of Banton. In the 1918 census, the island together with its sister island Isabel Island constituted one single barrio named Islas de las Dos Hermanas with 23 inhabitants.

== See also ==
- List of islands of the Philippines
