= Isabel ravana =

Scientific classification
- Kingdom: Animalia
- Phylum: Arthropoda
- Class: Insecta
- Order: Hemiptera
- Suborder: Heteroptera
- Family: Miridae
- Genus: Isabel; Kirkaldy, 1902
- Species: I. ravana

Binomial name
- Isabel ravana (Kirby, 1891)

Species of true bug

Isabel ravana is a species of plant bug, a type of insect in the family Miridae. It is the only accepted species in the genus Isabel.
