= St. Elizabeth's flood =

St. Elizabeth's flood (Sint Elisabethsvloed) may refer to floods that struck Europe's Low Countries on or around November 19, the name day of St. Elizabeth:

- St. Elizabeth's flood (1404)
- St. Elizabeth's flood (1421)
- St. Elizabeth's flood (1424)
