= Minori Cave =

Cave and archaeological site in the Philippines

- Location within Philippines
- Location: Peñablanca, Cagayan; Philippines
- Coordinates: 17°43′17″N 121°49′42″E
- Length: 147 m (482.3 ft)
- Elevation: 200 m (656.2 ft) meters above sea level
- Geology: Limestone formation
- Entrances: Two
- Features: Divided into four chambers
- Width: 7-11 meters

Minori Cave is part of the Callao limestone formation, located in Barangay Quibal, Municipality of Peñablanca, Cagayan Province in Northern Luzon. The said cave has two openings. One, designated as Mouth B, is located at 17° 43' 17" N latitude and 121° 49' 42" E longitude. The other opening, Mouth A is located 17° 43' 21" N latitude and 121° 49' 44" E longitude. The cave has an average elevation of about 200 m (656.2 ft) above sea level, and length and width of 147 m (482.3 ft) and 7 to 11 m (23.0 to 36.1 ft), respectively. The cave is divided into four chambers with mouth A as chamber A and mouth B as chamber D. Chambers B and C are in between the two mouths.

== Archaeological Findings ==
=== The Cagayan Valley Archaeological Project ===
The Cagayan Valley Archaeological Project was part of a series of archaeological expedition led by anthropologist Robert Fox in 1971 to search for the evidence of the early humans (now the Tabon Man) in the Philippines. Since then, the expedition focused more on the archaeological finds from different individual sites that were found during the expedition. This includes the slopes of the Cagayan Valley, revealing 54 sites rich in a variety of artefacts like paleolithic tools and remains. Some of the major cave sites that were discovered are the famous Callao Cave, Musang Cave, Rabel Cave and the Minori Cave, most of them are part of the Callao limestone formation. The great potential to find important artefacts in Cagayan led to the initiation of The Cagayan Valley Archaeological Project. From 1976 to 1982, 93 caves were already explored and 52 of which housed a variety of archaeological finds.

=== 1981 Excavation ===
From March to October 1981, the National Museum of the Philippines conducted archaeological excavations in the chamber D of Minori Cave. The 1981 team was able to retrieve a number of artifacts such as chert flake tools, chips, chunks, waste flakes and core as well as andesite flake tools, chips, chunks, cobble tools, waste flakes and earthenware potteries. There were also ecofacts recovered such animal bone fragments and teeth, shells and seeds. Listed below are the faunal remains found in Chamber D of the cave.

Classification	No. of Specimens	Classification	No. of Specimens
Cervus sp.	281	Macaderma s. spasma	3
Rodentia	483	Sus sp.	97
Rattus sp.	315	Carnivora	12
Mus sp.	3	Feloidea	2
Macapa sp.	15	Squamata	13
Aves	9	Varanus sp.	2
Bat	6	Fish	1

In chamber A, lithic implements(made of andesite and chert), earthenware and porcelain shreds, animal bone fragments, shells, lead and iron implements were found. According to Orogo(1982: no pagination), "the majority of shreds recovered were body portions of probably a vessel. The distinctive traces and marks on the earthenware were evidence that the earthenware were used for food storage.

=== 1999 Re-excavation of Minori Cave, Chamber D ===
The Minori Cave's chamber D was re-excavated in the year 1999. This time, the team used a spit system of excavation. Upon the analysis of vertical distribution of the recovered artifacts, two cultural horizons were identified; the uppermost, Cultural Layer II, contained both flakes, tools and ceramics, while Cultural Layer I contained a stratigraphically older assemblage of archaeological materials including stone tools but no ceramics. The team have been able to date a charcoal sample from an upper spit. The date was 4,590 years BP+/- 50. This effectively dated Cultural Layer II to the ceramic period.

== Conclusions ==
The Minori Cave flake samples were analyzed. The morphological attributes of the flakes, the completeness of the flakes, the shapes and scars on the flakes were recorded. The findings on the andesite flakes were then compared to chert flakes. According to the findings, the prehistoric people from the region were utilizing chert flakes regardless of size. The people are maximizing the use of the particular resource(chert), which is not as common as andesite in the area. The prehistoric people who were making and using these flakes in Minori Cave, were probably aware of the efficiency of chert in the form of flake tools. Although many andesite flakes found in the archaeological assemblages in Minori cave, less than half of the total andesite flakes collected displayed polish and striations. Base from the observations, the study of the stone tools (andesite and chert) has proven that the andesite tools were functionally tools, although they may not as efficient as chert flakes. This study is also an evidence that an expedient technology existed and persisted in Minori Cave in Northern Luzon (Philippines), as in the rest of the Southeast Asian region. The practicality of the industries is not due to cultural stagnation, but as an appropriate cultural adaptation by prehistoric people to their environment and its resources.
