= SS Santa Isabel =

A number of steamships were named Santa Isabel, including –

- SS Santa Isabel (Germany, 1914), a German collier scuttled in 1914 during the Battle of the Falkland Islands.
- SS Santa Isabel (Dunlop, 1914), a British cargo ship built by Dunlop, Bremner & Co. Captured and sunk by U-153 in 1918.
- SS Santa Isabel (NSM, 1914), an American cargo ship in service 1931–39
- SS Santa Isabel (1915), a Spanish cargo liner which sank in a storm in 1921
- SS Santa Isabel (1917), an American cargo ship sold in 1921 to Spain and which burnt and sank that year as Iquique.
- SS Santa Isabel (1939). An American Type C2 cargo ship in service 1939–41 and 1942–43.
