= Point Isabel Independent School District =

School district in Texas, United States

Address
- 101 Port Road Port Isabel, Texas, 78578; United States

District information
- Type: Public
- Grades: PreK–12
- NCES District ID: 4835250

Students and staff
- Students: 2,072
- Teachers: 132.72
- Staff: 179.88
- Student–teacher ratio: 15.61

Other information
- Website: www.pi-isd.net

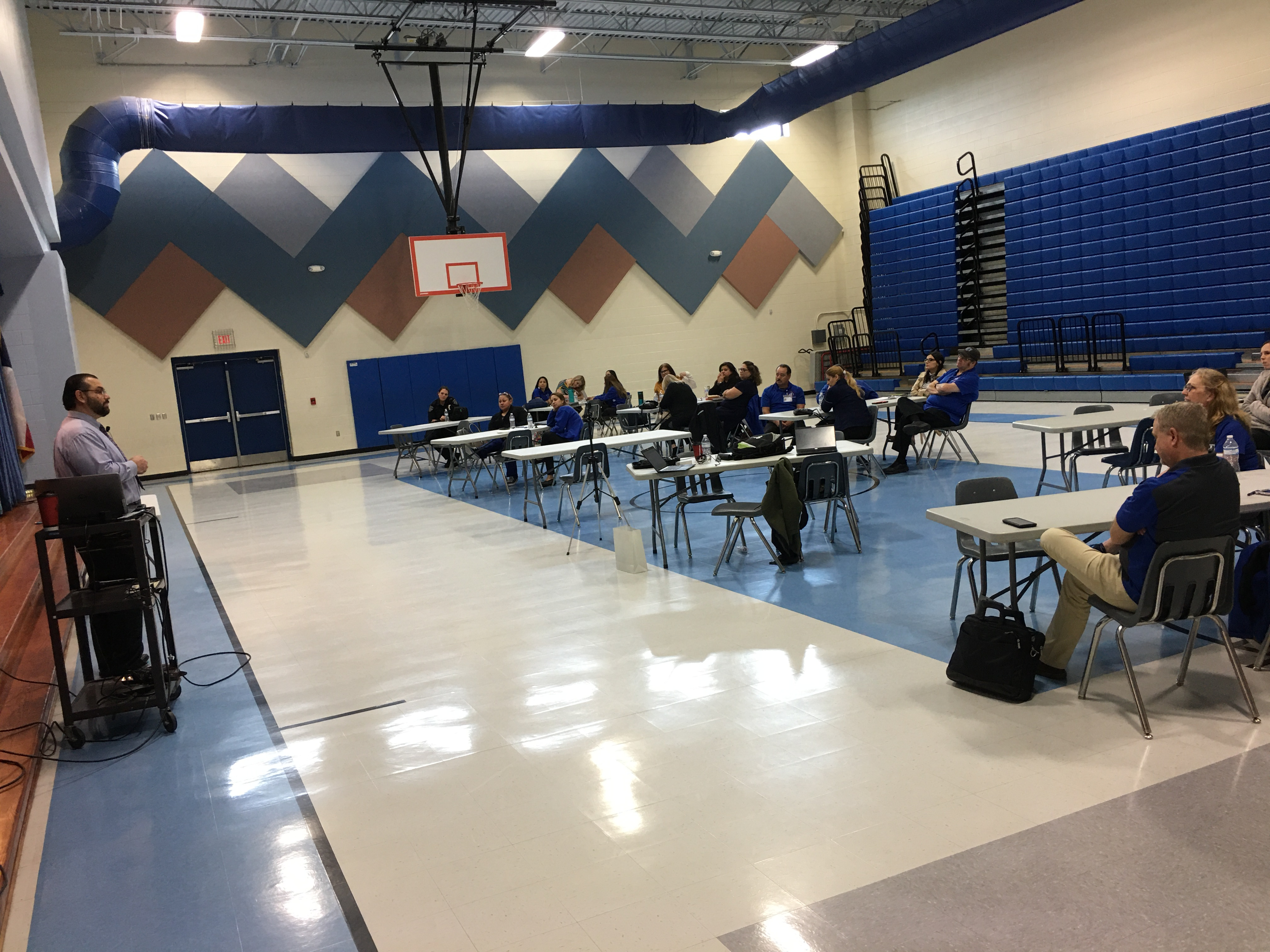
Derry Elementary

Point Isabel Independent School District is a public school district based in Port Isabel, Texas, United States.

In addition to Port Isabel, the district serves the towns of Laguna Vista and South Padre Island, as well as the unincorporated Cameron County community of Laguna Heights.

In 2009, the school district was rated "academically acceptable" by the Texas Education Agency.

== Schools ==
- Port Isabel High School (grades 9-12)
- Port Isabel Junior High School (grades 6-8)
- Derry Elementary School (grades 3-5)
- Garriga Elementary School (prekindergarten - grade 2)
