= Port Isabel High School =

Location
- 101 Port Road; Port Isabel, Texas 77979; United States; 26.078425°N 97.247070°W

Information
- Type: Public high school
- School district: Point Isabel Independent School District
- Superintendent: Theresa Alarcon
- Principal: Debra Quist
- Teaching staff: 43.72 (FTE)
- Grades: 9-12
- Enrollment: 593 (2023-2024)
- Student to teacher ratio: 13.56
- Colors: Royal blue, silver, and white
- Athletics conference: UIL Class 4A
- Team name: Tarpons
- Website: www.pi-isd.net/o/pihs

Port Isabel High School (PIHS) is a 4A public high school located in Port Isabel, Texas, United States. It is the sole high school in the Point Isabel Independent School District. For the 2024-2025 school year, the school was given a "B" by the Texas Education Agency. As of 2019, the school is no longer a part of the Blended Learning system following the arrival of new superintendent Theresa Alarcon and principal Imelda Munivez.

== Athletics ==
The Port Isabel Tarpons compete in:

- Baseball
- Basketball
- Cross country running
- Football
- Golf
- Marching band
- Powerlifting
- Soccer
- Softball
- Tennis
- Track and field
- Volleyball
- Robotics
- Esports
