= Isabel Island (Philippines) =

Island in the Philippines

- Interactive map of Isabel Island

Geography
- Coordinates: 13°1′22″N 121°55′43″E
- Archipelago: Romblon Group of Islands
- Adjacent to: Sibuyan Sea

Administration
- Philippines
- Region: Mimaropa
- Province: Romblon
- Municipality: Banton

Additional information

Isabel Island is an inhabited island in the province of Romblon in the Philippines. It is part of barangay Nasunogan in the municipality of Banton. In the 1918 census, the island together with its sister island Carlota Island constituted one single barrio named Isla de las Dos Hermanas (Spanish: Two Sisters Island) with 23 inhabitants.

== See also ==
- List of islands of the Philippines
