= Aransas =

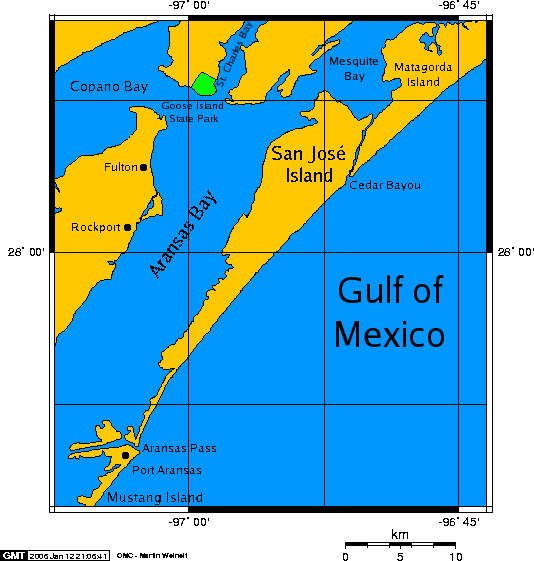
A map showing Aransas Bay, Aransas Pass, and Port Aransas

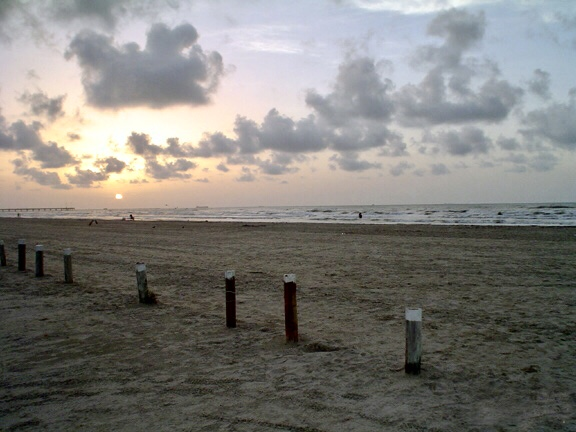
The beach along Port Aransas, Texas

Aransas (/əˈrænzəs/ ə-RAN-zəs) is a placename for several neighboring places in coastal Southern Texas.

- Aransas County, Texas
- The Aransas River, which begins in Bee County, Texas, and flows into Copano Bay in Aransas County
- The Aransas Bay, fed by Copano Bay
- Aransas Pass, Texas, which borders the Aransas Bay
- Port Aransas, Texas
- The Aransas Pass, a navigable salt water channel connecting the Gulf of Mexico with Aransas Bay
- The Aransas National Wildlife Refuge, north of Aransas River
- The ghost town of Aransas City
- The ghost town of Aransas
