= Aransas Bay =

Bay on the Gulf Coast in Texas, United States

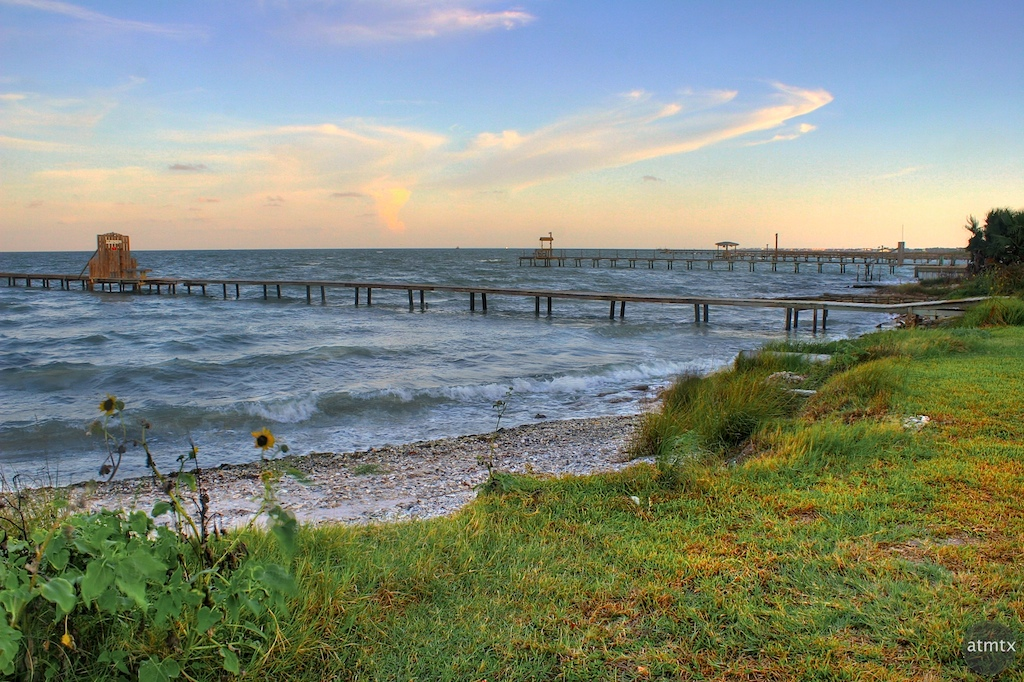
- Piers near Fulton

- Location within Texas

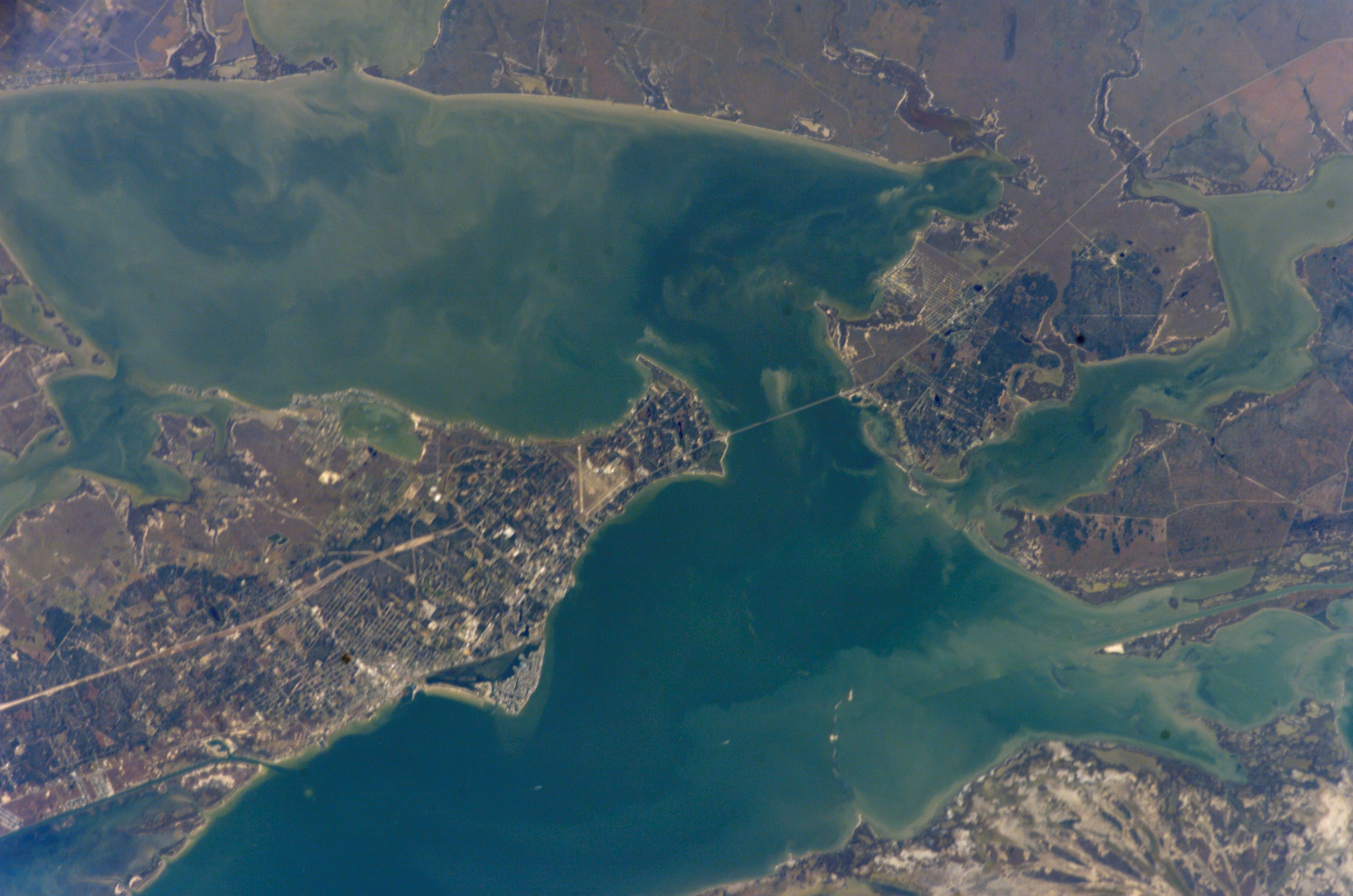
- Location: Texas Gulf Coast
- Coordinates: 28°03′01″N 96°59′30″W
- Ocean/sea sources: Gulf of Mexico
- Basin countries: United States
- Surface area: 111,780 acres (45,240 ha)

Aransas Bay is a bay on the Texas Gulf Coast, approximately 30 miles (48 km) northeast of Corpus Christi, and 173 miles (278 km) south of San Antonio. It is separated from the Gulf of Mexico by San José Island (also referred to as St. Joseph Island). Aransas Pass is the most direct navigable outlet into the Gulf of Mexico from the bay. The cities of Aransas Pass and Port Aransas are located at the southern end, and Rockport is found on the central western shore. The bay is oriented laterally northeast–southwest, and is extended by Redfish Bay to the southwest, Copano Bay to the west, Saint Charles Bay to the north, and Mesquite Bay to the northeast. Aransas Bay is part of the Mission-Aransas National Estuarine Research Reserve.

Aransas Bay is one of seven major estuaries along the Gulf Coast of Texas. There is a rich history of settlements on the bay, including ancient Native American campgrounds dating back millennia, 19th-century European immigrant towns such as Lamar and Aransas, and the present day cities of Rockport, Fulton and Aransas Pass. Resources such as shrimp, fish, oysters and oil are found in or near the bay, and contribute to the local economies.

== History ==
Humans first inhabited the area surrounding Aransas Bay approximately 6,000 to 8,000 years ago. The name derives from a group of indigenous people called the Aransas Indians, whose 4,000-year-old campsites have been found near the bay. The nomadic Aransas, left the area circa 1200 to 1300 CE. According to archeologists, the Karankawa and Coahuiltecan had coalesced as people and migrated into the area by 1400. They had severe losses and were much reduced by the 1800s due to new infectious diseases contracted from European explorers. Alonso Álvarez de Pineda of Spain is believed to be the first European to sail the bay, circa 1519. For over a century later, the Spanish had little interest in the area until the French established a colony in Texas in the late 17th century. At this time, Alonso De León was ordered to found a settlement in the area, but no permanent colony on the bay was ever established.

During the years of Mexican control, the bay was put off limits to settlement by the authorities. An empresario granted in 1828 allowed Irish and Mexican immigration. In 1832, the settlement of Aransas City on the bay, was founded by James Power. After the development of the nearby port Lamar in 1840, Aransas City was deserted by 1846. But Lamar soon met a similar fate, after being burnt to the ground during the American Civil War. The city of Aransas, which was founded on San Jose Island around the same time as Lamar, was also destroyed in the fighting. During the war, the bay was a strategically significant waterway for the transfer of freight, due to its protection from Gulf seas by barrier islands.

As a result of the destruction from the war, the new ports of Fulton and Rockport were developed in the later 1860s. At first, Rockport was intended as a deep-water port, but after a series of mishaps, Aransas Pass was selected when deepening was approved in 1879. By 1912, a 100 feet wide and 8½ feet deep channel was operational. After hurricanes ransacked the port in 1916 and 1919, the United States Army Corps of Engineers chose Corpus Christi as the preferred deepwater port for the lower Gulf Coast.

Later twentieth-century development has been based on the area's natural beauty. In the 1960s, the affluent resort of Key Allegro, located between Rockport and Fulton, was founded. By 2000, 24,615 people lived in the surrounding Aransas County, including the cities of Rockport, Fulton, Aransas Pass and the unincorporated Key Allegro, Holiday Beach and Estes. The outer Refugio County located on the shore of Copano Bay, had 7,828 residents.

== Features ==
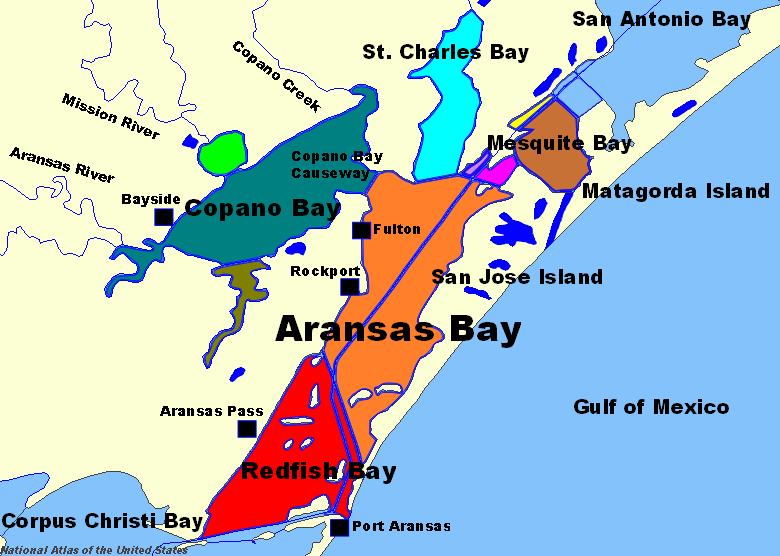
Aransas Bay (orange), Redfish Bay (red), Mission Bay (lime), Port Bay (olive), Copano Bay (aquamarine), Saint Charles Bay (light blue), Dunham Bay (violet), Carlos Bay (pink), Sundown Bay (yellow) and Mesquite Bay (brown).

On average, the Aransas Bay system is 3 meters deep, and covers approximately 539 square kilometers. The system is made up of the bay itself and its extensions. The main extensions include: Saint Charles Bay, to the east of the Lamar peninsula; Copano Bay, to the west of both the Live Oak and Lamar peninsulas, Mesquite Bay to the bay's northeast, and Redfish Bay to the southwest. Redfish Bay is sometimes considered an extension of Corpus Christi Bay.

Together with its extensions, Aransas Bay forms one of seven major estuaries along the Gulf Coast of Texas, receiving the discharge from the Mission River and the Aransas River, as well as smaller streams such as Copano Creek. Every second, approximately 28 cubic meters of water flows into the bay. Water exchange with the Gulf of Mexico occurs at Cedar Bayou and Aransas Pass. As a result of the seawater exchange, the bay's average salinity is 15 parts per thousand, compared to the seawater average of 35 ppt. Fresh water flows also arrive from the impact of the Guadalupe River on San Antonio Bay. Combined, the fresh water influence is 60 to 70 percent of the system's volume, which is judged to be minimal.

Texas State Highway 35 runs parallel to the shore of Aransas Bay on its route from Corpus Christi to Houston. The highway includes the 1.5 mile long Copano Bay causeway, which connects the Live Oak and Lamar peninsulas at the confluence of Copano and Aransas Bays. The first causeway was constructed in 1933, but was replaced in 1966 with the Lyndon Baines Johnson causeway. The former causeway was transformed into a fishing pier in later years. In 1981, nearly 10,000 vehicles passed over the bridge on a daily basis.

== Ecosystem ==
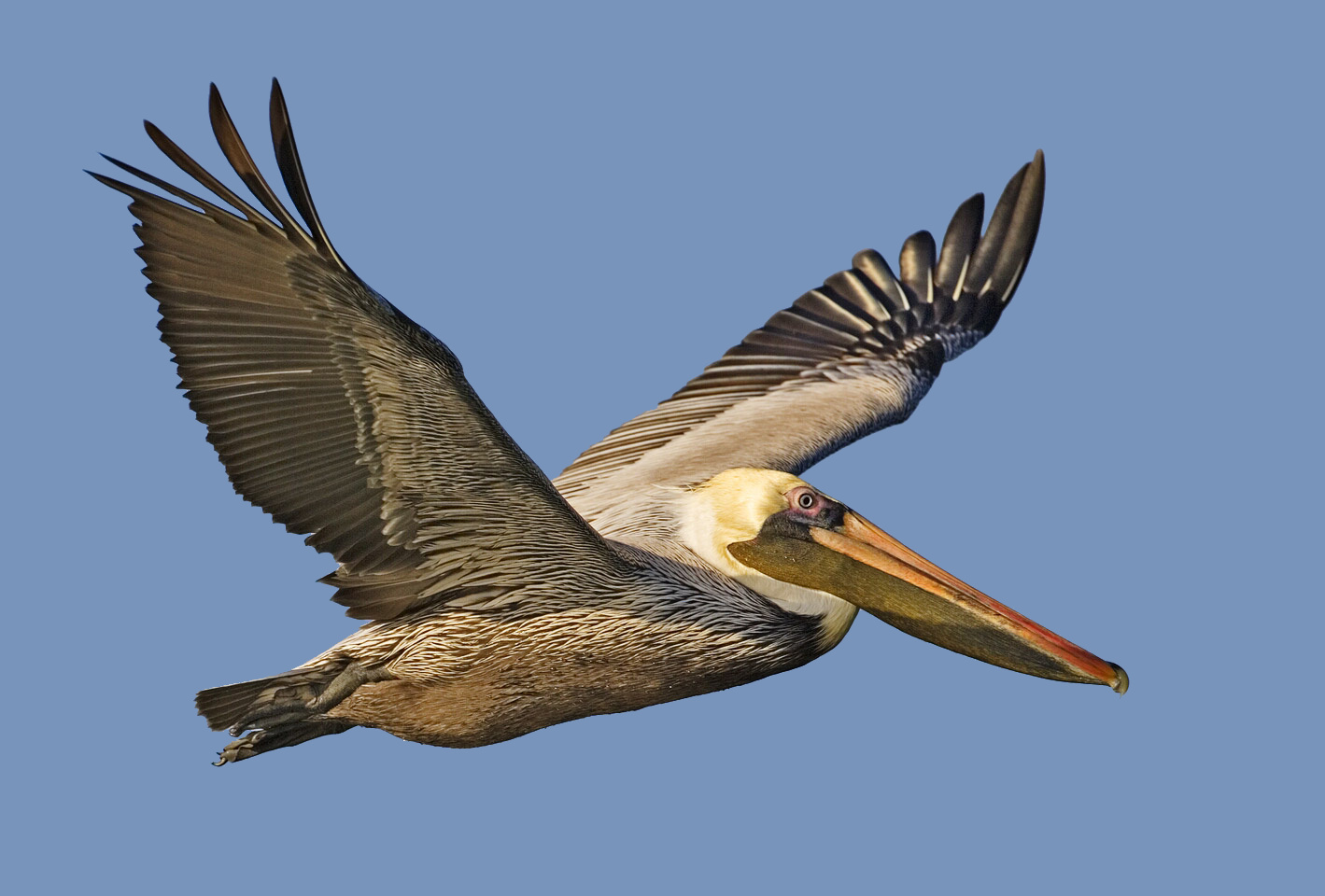
Brown pelican flying over Fulton harbor

A wide variety of wildlife can be found in and around Aransas Bay. According to Texas Parks and Wildlife, the following fish have been caught in the bay: catfish, black drum, red drum, eel, southern flounder, crevalle jack, yellowtail amberjack, ladyfish, silver perch, pigfish, pinfish, sea trout, blacktip shark, bull shark, sheepshead, mangrove snapper, common snook and toadfish. Shrimp, oysters and crabs also reside in the waters. The sea grass carpets found at numerous locations, provide a habitat and an ideal place for fish to spawn. The grasses also act as a filter, clearing the bay of environmental contaminants.

Many birds migrate to the area around Aransas Bay, most notably to the Aransas National Wildlife Refuge. Year-round residents include least grebe, brown pelican, neotropic cormorant, white-faced ibis, roseate spoonbill, black-bellied whistling-duck, mottled duck, white-tailed hawk, crested caracara, pauraque, golden-fronted woodpecker, great kiskadee, green jay, long-billed thrasher, olive sparrow, seaside sparrow, and bronzed cowbird. The endangered whooping crane has also been spotted near the bay. Despite the fact that there were only 15 in 1900, over 180 are found in the wild today. The whooping crane's and other birds' survival depends on the availability of blue crab. Thousands of crab traps have been removed to preserve the population.

== Industry ==
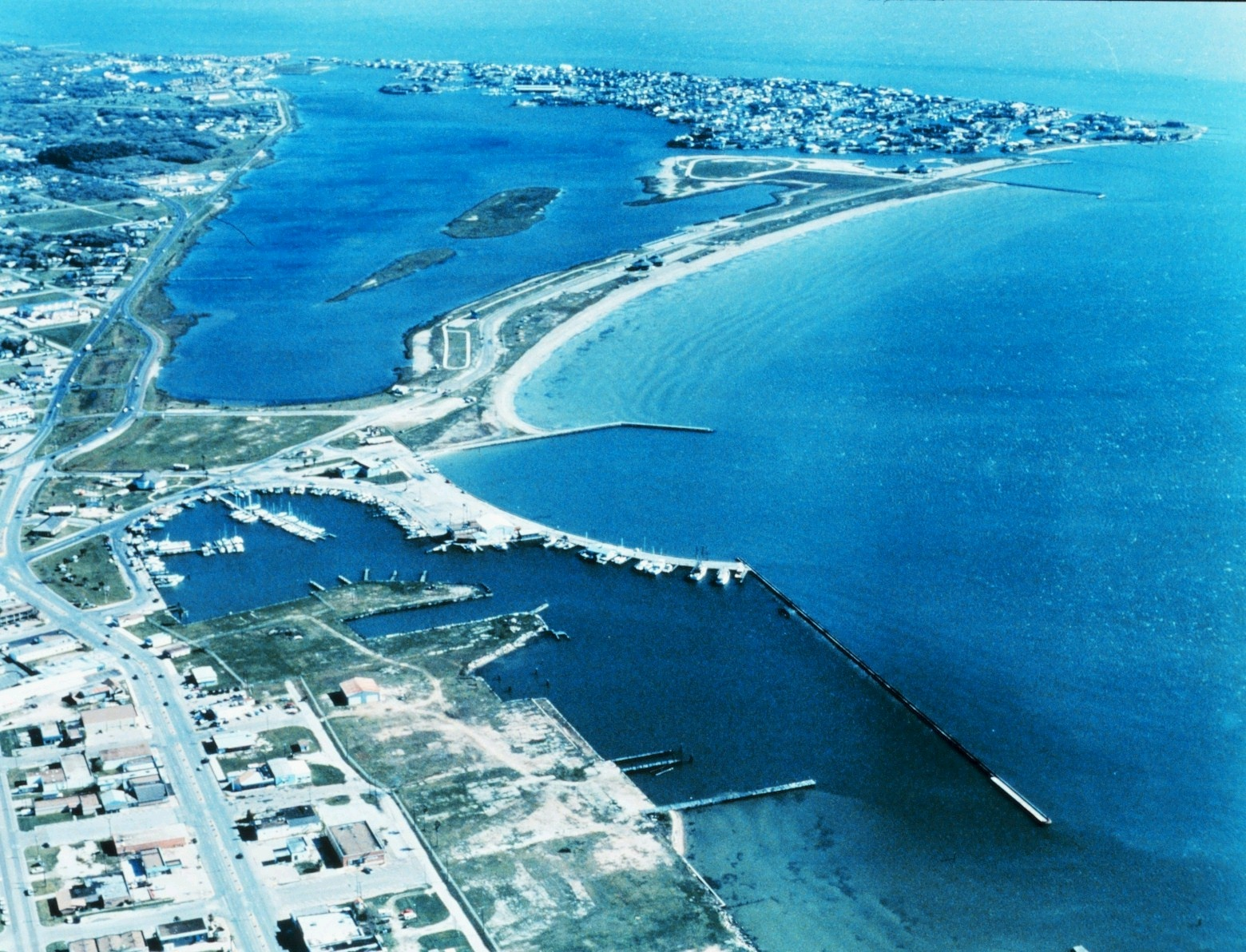
Rockport Beach on Aransas Bay.

Given the location of Aransas bay, shipping has always been a major industry. Following the Civil War, the meatpacking industry became a major source of income for ports on the bay, especially Rockport and Fulton, where numerous slaughterhouses were constructed. In the early years of meatpacking, cattle were slaughtered strictly for their hide since there was no way to refrigerate the meat. As a result, most of the left over cow parts not used as pig feed, were disposed in the bay. This changed in 1871, when an ice machine was installed in a packing plant. By this time, the meatpacking industry near Aransas Bay reached its prime. Prior to the decline of the industry in the area, in 1880, 93% of the beef from Texas slaughterhouses were processed in Rockport-Fulton. Along with fishing, oyster farming and most notably shrimping became major industries on the bay in the early 20th century. Shipbuilding also developed and reached its prime following the first World War. During World War II, the United States Navy took over several shipyards. In 1936, oil was discovered on the bay. By 1946, 13 wells were in operation. In 1990, 498,703 barrels were produced, part of the 77 million barrels produced between 1936 and 1990. Today, tourism is a prosperous industry. Numerous hotels are set up along the bay for individuals wanting to fish, bird or sight-see. A large concentration of hotels are located in Rockport, where the bay's only beach (Rockport Beach) is located.
