= St. Charles Bay =

Inlet in Aransas Bay, Texas, US

- Location within Texas
- Location: Texas Gulf Coast
- Coordinates: 28.190967°N 96.941299°W
- River sources: Cavasso Creek
- Ocean/sea sources: Gulf of Mexico
- Basin countries: United States
- Settlements: Lamar, Texas

St. Charles Bay is an inlet of Aransas Bay in Aransas County, Texas. It is flanked by Lamar peninsula on the west and Blackjack peninsula on the east. The bay hosts a valued ecosystem for the endangered whooping crane, and is a prime location for birding and fishing. Goose Island State Park and the Aransas National Wildlife Refuge are located along the bay's shores, attracting nature enthusiasts year-round.

The nomadic Karankawa Indians used the bay for hunting before the arrival of Europeans, but no major human settlements were ever established. The unincorporated community of Lamar on Live Oak Peninsula is the only substantial community that borders the bay. The cities of Rockport and Fulton on the main Aransas Bay are located only a few miles away, and the bay is usually considered a part of the collective Rockport-Fulton area. The bay is roughly 150 miles (240 km) southeast of San Antonio and about 40 miles (64 km) northeast of Corpus Christi.

== History ==
St. Charles Bay was the domain of the Karankawa Indians before the arrival of European settlers. The Spanish referred to the bay as Laguna del Bergantine, which translated to the Lagoon of the Brigantine. The name is the likely source of Burgantine Lake, found at the bay's head. The name derived from a Spanish vessel that was being used to transfer money to Texas to bribe Mexican soldiers at Goliad and San Antonio in 1818. It was caught in an Aransas Bay storm that swept the ship into the waters of St. Charles Bay, landing in a creek at its base. Supposedly, the ship was abandoned in the surrounding prairie (Fagan ranch near Tivoli, Texas), and its parts used by area settlers (later determined to be the Fagan family) to build homes.

The first major settlement on St. Charles Bay was Lamar, founded in 1839 by James W. Byrne. The town was named for Mirabeau B. Lamar, who was elected as President of Texas the previous year. The settlers aimed to compete with Aransas City on the adjacent Live Oak Peninsula. After a customhouse was moved from Aransas City, at the behest of President Lamar, Aransas City declined and Lamar grew into a prosperous port and salt producer. It was bombarded and destroyed by the Union during the American Civil War, leaving only the ruins of a Catholic chapel and a few homes. Shortly thereafter, the town was rebuilt. By 1915, a post office, school, hotel, ranches and twenty-five homes had been constructed at the site. By 1970, 150 people lived in the town and by 2000, it had 1,600 residents. It remains an unincorporated community of Aransas County.

== Features ==
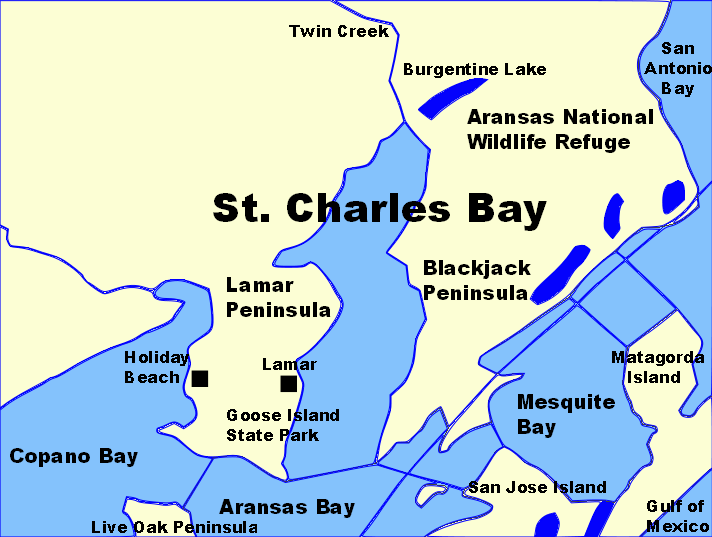
Map of St. Charles Bay

St. Charles Bay is shaped laterally from south to north, and is located on the Texas Coastal Plain between the Lamar and Blackjack peninsulas. Its mouth opens into Aransas Bay between Goose Island and Blackjack Point, but is nearly cut off by islands and reefs that stretch across it. North of Blackjack Point to Bird Point is an extension called the East Pocket, which forms an indention at the tip of Blackjack peninsula. Beyond the East Pocket are mudflats that are included in the Aransas National Wildlife Refuge. North of Bird Point, the shore continues northward, passing the La Punta Windmill. Further north, past a large tidal swamp, Egg Point juts into the bay, above which an inlet forms the Bill Mott Bayou. Past several more swamps, Little Devil Bayou and Big Devil Bayou are formed, separated by Indian Head Point. Past the Mille Dietrich Point, the McHubb Windmill and Bayou are found, as the bay narrows in width. The northernmost point is located slightly to the east and meets at the mouth of the small Twin Creek. A narrow strip of marshland and a dam, separates St. Charles Bay from the similarly shaped Burgentine Lake, which continues to the northeast, and is fed by Burgentine Creek. Past Twin Creek, the shore curves to the southwest to a small opening, that forms the mouth of Salt Creek. Further south, the shore is largely marsh, until reaching the rather large mouth of Cavasso Creek. From there, the shore forms a straight line southeast to the Big Sharp Point, from which a gas well can be seen in the bay. South of Big Sharp Point is Little Sharp Point, which forms on the edge of a swamp. From this point, the shore curves back to the southwest to a swamp, where a lagoon is located further inland. South of this, is the large oak tree known as the "Big Tree", in Goose Island State Park. Further south are several piers which jut into the bay, below which Halls Point is formed. Directly south of Halls Point is Goose Island, back at to the confluence with Aransas Bay.

== Ecosystem ==
Saint Charles Bay serves as a habitat for approximately 300 species of birds. Birders venture to the site between November and March, when the creatures winter near the bay. The endangered whooping crane, the largest bird in North America, is the most highly prized sight as only a few hundred remain, including three families on St. Charles Bay. The bird was near extinction in the early 20th century, as only two flocks between Canada and Texas remained. The population increased following the organization of the Aransas Migratory Waterfowl Refuge in 1937, after the Federal government purchased the land of the St. Charles ranch from San Antonio oilman Leroy G. Denman, using funds from commemorative stamps. The Refuge later became known as the Aransas National Wildlife Refuge. Whooping cranes are also protected by Goose Island State Park, which was established by the State of Texas in 1931. Other birds that migrate to the bay include the sandhill crane, American white pelican, brown pelican, roseate spoonbill, great blue heron and Canada goose. The blue crab and other shellfish, help sustain the bird population. Thirty seven species of mammals are found on Blackjack peninsula, including white-tailed deer, nine-banded armadillos and collared peccaries. The spotted seatrout and redfish are the common finfish that reside in the bay. While trout are generally found in the bay's deeper waters, redfish live in shallow waters; their tail fins can be spotted above the surface during the peak summer and fall months. The bay also supports a healthy population of American alligators, which reside in shallow waters. Signs alert visitors to be careful.

== Industry ==
During the 19th century salt evaporation ponds were dug in tidal marshes around the bay, producing salt for condiments and to be used as a preservative for meats. Today, due to the bay's location, east of Goose Island State Park and west of the Aransas National Wildlife Refuge, very little industry can be found. No industrial plants are located on the bay's shore, but a few gas and oil wells are present. The Continental Oil Company is allowed to obtain oil and gas from the Aransas National Wildlife Refuge as part of the purchase of St. Charles Ranch. Goose Island offers a few piers and campgrounds facing the bay, which encourage tourism. The privately owned St. Charles Bay Hunting Club is also found in this area, and allows hunting, boating and fishing on the bay while striving to protect the ecosystem. The lack of coastal winds also attracts tourists interested in kayaking and wade fishing, however, boating is hindered by the general shallowness of the bay and the abundance of oyster reefs. Shellfish production is approved throughout the bay, but shrimping is prohibited due to the classification of St. Charles Bay as a nursery bay.
