= Aransas City, Texas =

Coordinates: 28.1043°N 97.0203°W

Aransas City is a ghost town on the tip of the Live Oak Peninsula in Aransas County, Texas, United States, near present-day Fulton. It served as a port on Aransas Bay at its confluence with Copano Bay during the 1830s and 1840s, but declined following its loss of a Republic of Texas customhouse to the rival port of Lamar.

== History ==
Prior to the Texas Revolution, empresario James Power constructed his house on the northern tip of Live Oak Peninsula at the site of the former Spanish fort of Aránzazu, which guarded Copano Bay to the west. Power later founded the town in 1837 in what was then Refugio County and partnered with former Texas Governor Henry Smith to organize and advertise the town to potential settlers. Afterwards, several stores were established and the population reached 500. The town was incorporated in 1839, included a customhouse for the Republic of Texas, and served as the county seat of Refugio County until 1840. The town was attacked by the Karankawa and Comanche Indians several times and was raided by the Mexican irregulars in 1838, 1839 and 1841.

After the founding of Corpus Christi by former Aransas City-resident Henry Kinney, the port was no longer the westernmost in Texas. It soon lost its customhouse to the rival port of Lamar in a controversial decision that contributed to the town's demise: Lamar had been founded in 1839, on the other side of the present day Copano Bay Causeway (on Lamar peninsula) by settler James Byrne, who had been affiliated with Power. The town was named after the newly elected President Mirabeau B. Lamar, whom Byrne lobbied, to relocate the Aransas City customhouse. Lamar complied with the request, ignoring an Aransas City petition that opposed the move, and soon Aransas City was stripped of its designation as the county seat. The events mirrored the political feud between Lamar, who was supported by Byrne, and former President Sam Houston, whom Power backed. Power moved on to Copano, and by 1847, Aransas City was largely abandoned and no longer had a functioning government.
