= James Power (empresario) =

James Power (1788 or 1789 – August 15, 1852) was an Irish-born Texan empresario, politician and signer of the Texas Declaration of Independence, known for the land grant he received with partner James Hewetson that included the coastal area between the mouths of the Guadalupe and Nueces Rivers, as well as his founding and service as the first mayor of the Aransas City settlement. He often represented Refugio County during statewide conventions. Was part of the Mexican national era

== Early life ==
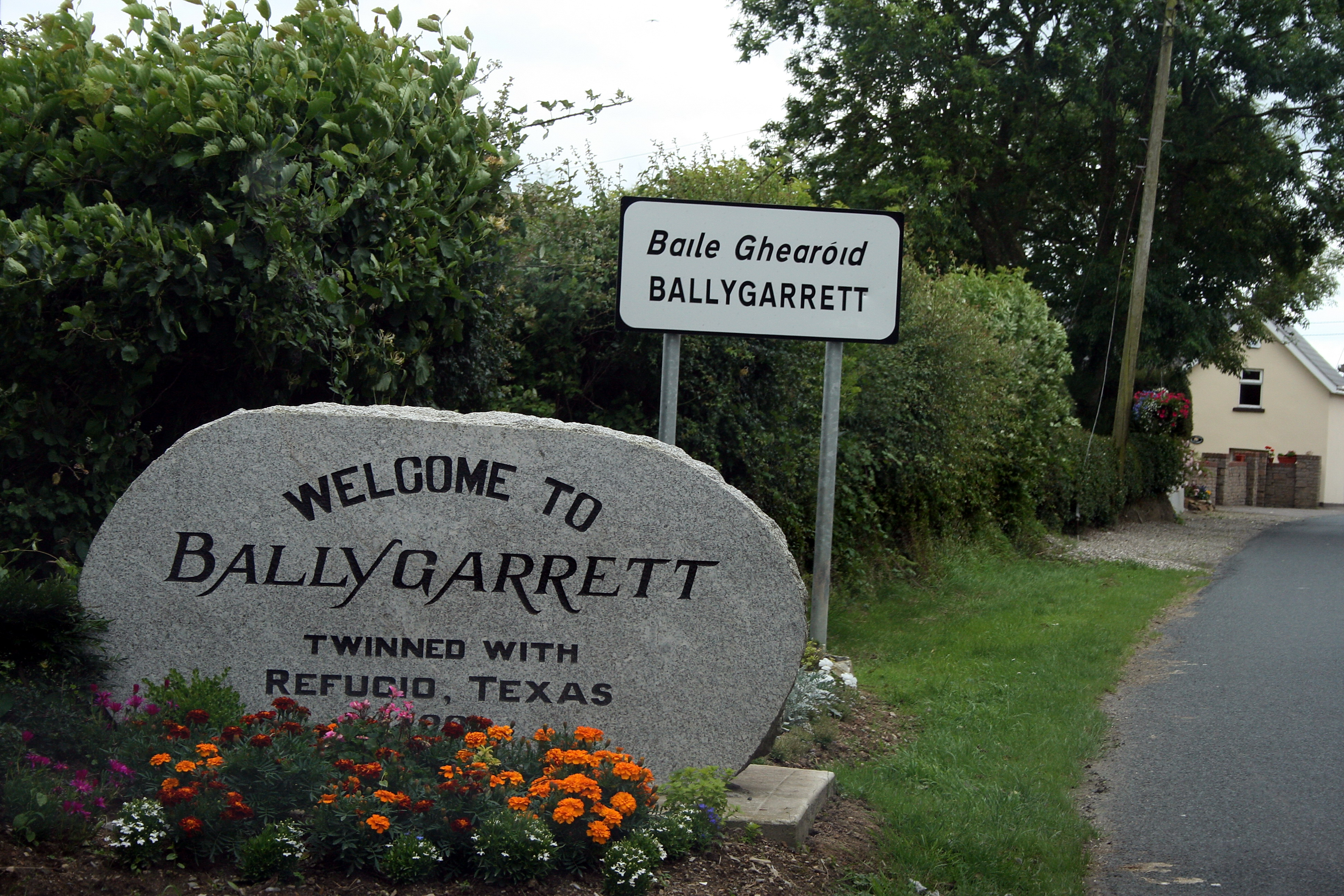
Ballygarrett, Ireland, twinned with Refugio, Texas in honor of James Power

Power was born either in 1788 or 1789 at the small rural village of Ballygarrett in County Wexford, Ireland. In 1809, he relocated to New Orleans, where he labored as a merchant for the next twelve years. During his time in New Orleans, Power met with Stephen F. Austin, who notified him of the land grant (empresario) offerings from the Mexican government. Hoping to cash in on the opportunity, he moved to Saltillo via Matamoros in 1821, and became a citizen of Mexico. During his stay in Saltillo, he was employed in the mining equipment industry and entered into a partnership with merchant and fellow Irishman James Hewetson.

== Empresario ==
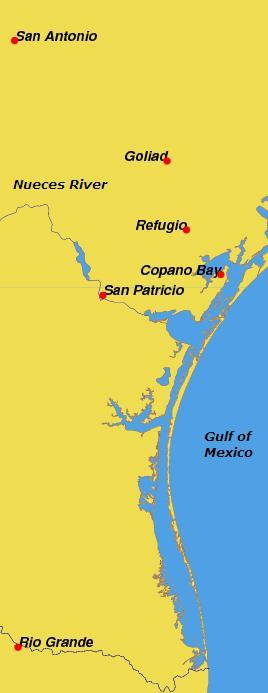
Map showing Refugio, Copano, and the Nueces River. Fort Lipantitlán was located across the Nueces River from San Patricio.

After forming the partnership, Power and Hewetson applied for an empresario with the Mexican government in 1825 to begin a colony on the Texas coast with Mexican and Irish families. The original 1826 application requested for a grant between the Nueces and Sabine Rivers, but in 1828, the Mexican government instead offered the strip of land between the Guadalupe and Lavaca Rivers. The next year, Power and Hewetson requested more land and their holdings were extended west to the Nueces River, which included Nuestra Señora del Refugio Mission. Ownership disputes with other empresarios forced Power and Hewetson to cede some land east of the Guadalupe River and the new eastern boundary was drawn at Coleto Creek.

In 1833, Power returned to Ireland and searched for potential settlers of his colony. He convinced 350 individuals to travel with him to Texas to begin a settlement with promises of large plots of land. The immigrants traveled in two group with the first scheduled to land in New Orleans in April and the next scheduled for May. After the first group arrived in New Orleans, many of the settlers were struck with cholera and died. An additional lot were infected with cholera during the voyage from New Orleans to Texas, and died at the landing in Copano. These who survived either remained in Copano or traveled to the Refugio Mission, where they formed a settlement with Mexican colonists. In 1834, he sailed with his nephew Thomas O'Connor, from Ireland to Texas and was able to have the newly formed independent Republic of Mexico granted them access to the country's unpopulated northern lands. On September 28, 1834, the Mexican government granted O'Connor 4,428 acres as a "settler in the Power and Hewetson colony". In 1835, Hewetson sold his share of the empresario to Power and returned to Mexico. The land claims were eventually deemed invalid by the new Republic of Texas and designated as property of the state.

== Texas Independence ==
Power became involved in the struggle for Texas Independence around 1835, and was a part of the Lipantitlán expedition that led to the Battle of Lipantitlán. He also was present at the Convention of 1836 and signed the Texas Declaration of Independence as a representative of Refugio County. During the convention, he convinced his fellow members to seat Sam Houston as president, and helped draft the Constitution of the Republic of Texas. Afterwards, he was sent to New Orleans to retrieve supplies for the Texas army, and assisted the ultimate victory.

== Later endeavors ==
In 1837, Power partnered with former Texas Governor Henry Smith to establish the settlement of Aransas City near Power's home on Live Oak Peninsula, just north of present-day Fulton. He established a post office, wharf and customhouse at the site, which grew into a valued port and settlement of about 500 people. Power served as the town's first mayor following incorporation in 1839. However, the town declined after Lamar was established nearby, and President Mirabeau B. Lamar, a political opponent of Sam Houston, whom Power supported, decided to strip Aransas City of its customhouse and present it to Lamar.

Power served on the Second Congress for Refugio County during the 1845 Convention that decided to approve the United States' annexation of Texas.

== Personal life and death ==
In 1832, Power married Dolores de la Portilla, the daughter of Spanish colonizer Felipe Roque de la Portilla, and had two children. He later married his wife's sister following her death, and had five additional children.

Power died on August 15, 1852, and was buried near his house, but was later reinterred at Mount Calvary Cemetery in Refugio. The site of his house, the first lot plotted in incorporated Refugio, was designated as a historical landmark in 1936. This house, known as the Ballygarrett House, is currently owned by Dagoberto and Barbara Gonzalez.
