= Aransas River =

Coordinates: 28°04′34″N 97°13′05″W

- Map Map of the Aransas River

Location
- Country: United States
- State: Texas

The Aransas River is a short river in south Texas in the United States. It drains an area of the south Texas coastal plains into the Gulf of Mexico. It rises in Bee County southwest of Beeville and north of Skidmore, from the confluence of three creeks: Olmos, Aransas, and Poesta. It flows generally south and southeast in a highly winding course, entering Copano Bay on the Gulf of Mexico along the Refugio-Aransas county line, approximately 10 miles (16 km) northwest of Rockport.

For some of the period when Texas was a state in Mexico, the Aransas formed the southwestern boundary, separating it from the neighboring Mexican state of Coahuila.

== See also ==
- List of rivers of Texas
- Aransas Bay
- Aransas County, Texas
- Aransas Pass, Texas
