= Aransas, Texas =

Ghost town in Texas, US

- Ghost town
- Location in Texas
- Coordinates: 27.84854800°N 97.04660000°W
- Country: United States
- State: Texas
- County: Aransas

Aransas is a ghost town on San José Island, in Aransas County, Texas, United States. Founded c. 1845, it was formerly named St. Josephs and located in neighboring Refugio County, later being renamed. It was platted by Ebenezer Allen and William G. Hale. A primarily maritime and agricultural economy, it was connected to mainland Texas via ferry, and was a port for Charles Morgan's freighters. A post office opened there by 1860, later closing. It declined during and after the American Civil War due to the Union blockade. Fort Semmes was established at the time, and was commanded by Benjamin F. Neal to fire artillery at invading Union soldiers. Union forces captured the fort in February 1863 then were ousted by cavalrymen led by Daniel D. Shea, but the Union recaptured it and destroyed the town, being abandoned from then on. In 1871, it was moved to Aransas County.
