= San José Island (Texas) =

Barrier island in Texas Gulf Coast owned by billionaire Bass family

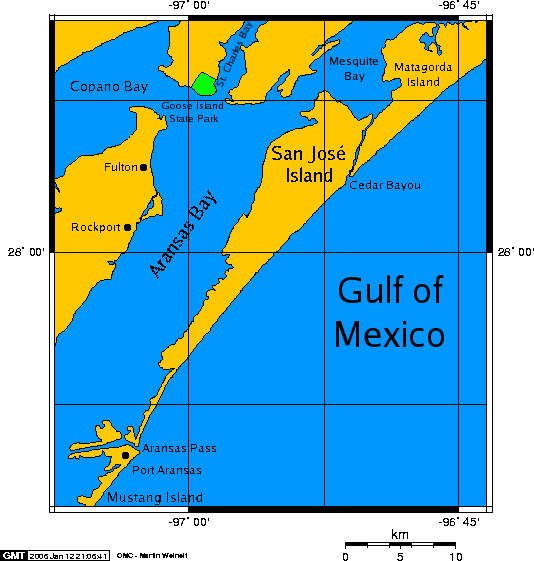
- San José Island and Aransas Bay

- Location in Texas Location in the United States

Geography
- Location: Gulf of Mexico
- Coordinates: 27°58′41″N 96°56′49″W
- Archipelago: Texas barrier islands
- Length: 21 mi (34 km)
- Width: 5 mi (8 km)

Administration
- United States
- State: Texas
- County: Aransas County

San Jose Island or San José Island (also known as Saint Joseph Island) is a barrier island on the Gulf Coast of Texas in the United States.

21 miles (34 km) long and 5 miles (8.0 km) wide. The island is oriented generally northeast–southwest, with the Gulf of Mexico on the east and south, Aransas Bay on the west, and Mesquite Bay on the north. At the southern end of the island is Aransas Pass (not to be confused with the City of Aransas Pass which is on the mainland), beyond which is Mustang Island and the town of Port Aransas. Aransas Pass is protected by jetties extending into the Gulf from both Mustang Island and San José Island. The island's northern end used to be separated from Matagorda Island by Cedar Bayou. Cedar Bayou does not run freely through the two islands any longer.

== History ==
On July 26, 1845, Lt. Chandler of the USS Alabama waded ashore and planted the first American flag to fly over Texas territory on a sand dune on San Jose Island. Units of the Third Infantry established a small military town known as Aransas. A stagecoach service brought passengers, goods and mail to the town, and a ferry connected the island with the mainland. During the American Civil War, the Union Army removed livestock from the island and assaulted the town of Aransas, of which no obvious trace today remains. After the war, the island's sole town ceased to exist, and it became an exclusive hunting and fishing resort.

It was purchased by Texas oilman Sid W. Richardson and used as his private island. On it he built a lavish hunting lodge at great expense, to which prominent businessmen and politicians, including then Senator Lyndon B. Johnson and President Franklin D. Roosevelt, were invited.

In August 2017, the island was affected by Hurricane Harvey as the storm made landfall as a Category 4 hurricane with peak winds of 130 mph (210 km/h).

== Other sources ==
- Saint Joseph Island from the Handbook of Texas Online
- San José Island sea kayaking map
