= Palm Harbor, Texas =

- Unincorporated community
- Location within Texas Location within the United States
- Coordinates: 27.9705758°N 97.0938786°W
- Country: United States
- State: Texas
- County: Aransas
- Elevation: 3 ft (0.91 m)
- Time zone: UTC-6 (Central (CST))
  - Summer (DST): UTC-5 (CDT)
- Area code: 361
- GNIS feature ID: 1343461

Palm Harbor is an unincorporated community in Aransas County, in the U.S. state of Texas. According to the Handbook of Texas, its population was 125 in 2000. It is located within the Corpus Christi metropolitan area.

== History ==
Residents of the community worked and shopped in nearby Rockport, and is considered a bedroom community of Rockport.

== Geography ==
Palm Harbor is located on Texas State Highway 35, 3 mi (4.8 km) southwest of Rockport in southern Aransas County.

== Education ==
Today, the community is served by the Aransas County Independent School District.
