= Estes, Texas =

- Unincorporated community
- Location within Texas Location within the United States
- Coordinates: 27.9639094°N 97.1002675°W
- Country: United States
- State: Texas
- County: Aransas
- Elevation: 7 ft (2.1 m)
- Time zone: UTC-6 (Central (CST))
  - Summer (DST): UTC-5 (CDT)
- Area code: 361
- GNIS feature ID: 1378272

Estes is an unincorporated community in Aransas County, in the U.S. state of Texas. According to the Handbook of Texas, its population was 50 in 2000. It is located within the Corpus Christi metropolitan area.

== Geography ==
Estes is located on Texas State Highway 35, 4 mi (6.4 km) southwest of Rockport in southern Aransas County.

== Education ==
The community is served by the Rockport-Fulton Independent School District.

== See also ==
- Redfish Bay
