= Aransas Pass =

Water channel

Coordinates: 27°52′10″N 97°05′49″W

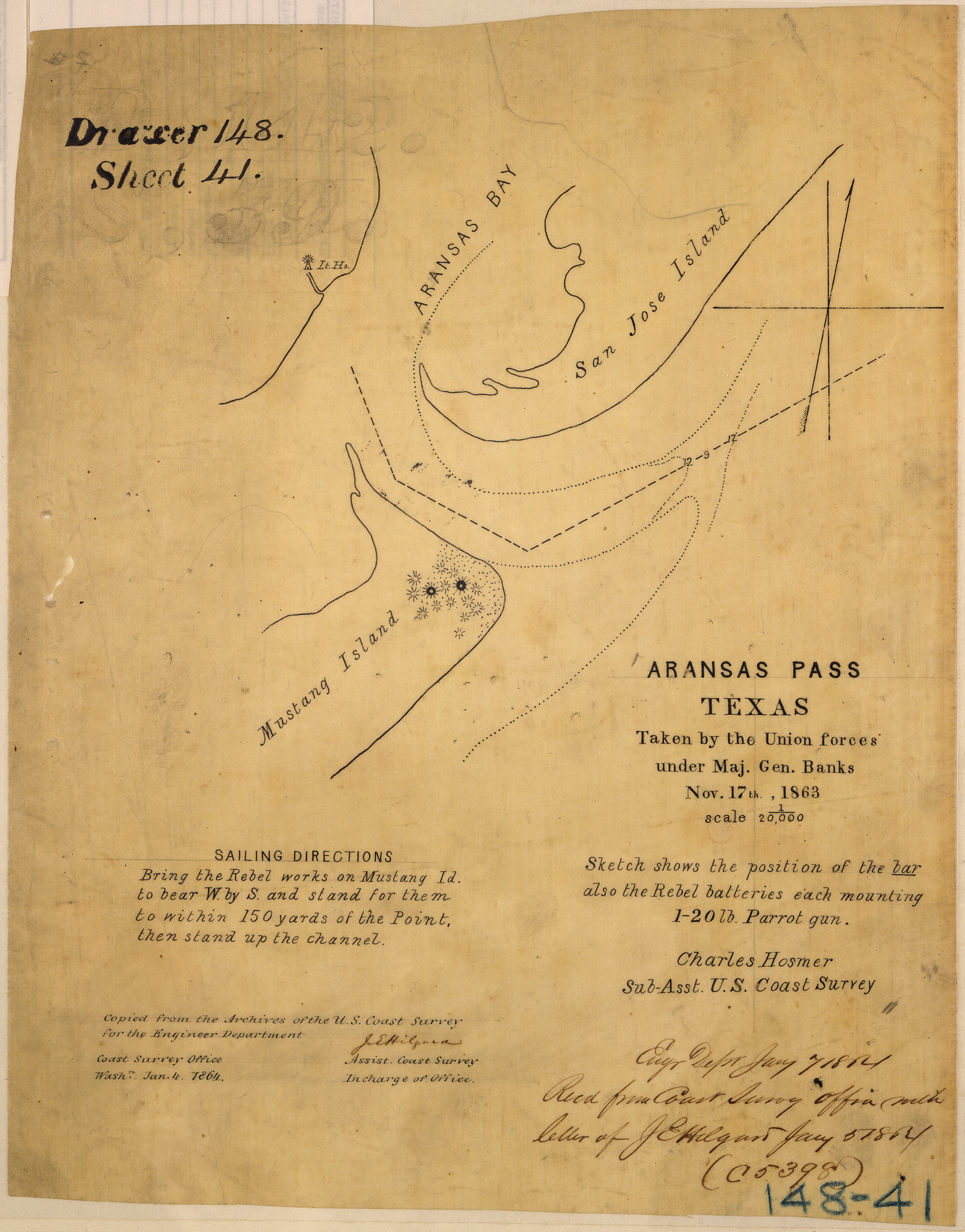
Map, taken by the Union forces, shows the position of the bar, also the Rebel batteries, each mounting 1-20 lb. Parrott gun

Aransas Pass is a navigable salt water channel connecting the Gulf of Mexico with Aransas Bay on the Texas Gulf coast in the United States. The pass separates Mustang Island to the south from San José Island to the north, and is protected by jetties extending into the Gulf from both islands. At the eastern end of the pass is the town of Port Aransas, located at the far northern end of Mustang Island. At the western end of the pass, on the mainland side of Aransas Bay, is the town of Aransas Pass. A free ferry serves the two towns. The pass is located on the Aransas County and Nueces County line.

The second lighthouse in Texas was built at Aransas Pass by the United States government to protect shipping in Aransas Bay. Aransas Pass was originally pictured as becoming a major Texas hub of commerce and travel with rail links to the harbor and harbor links by ships to Mexico, New York and other destinations. Today, Aransas Pass is the major pass for all oceangoing traffic into and out of the port of Corpus Christi.

== See also ==
- Aransas Pass, Texas
- Aransas County, Texas

== External sources ==
- Aransas Pass from the Handbook of Texas Online
- The New Aransas Pass Progress newspaper.
