= Cedar Bayou =

Saltwater canal in Texas, USA

Coordinates: 28°04′N 96°51′W

Cedar Bayou is a salt water channel on the Texas coast that separates San Jose Island from Matagorda Island. The pass serves as a water exchange between the Gulf of Mexico and the San Antonio, Matagorda and Aransas Bay systems.

== History ==
Cedar Bayou was first closed in 1979 to protect Mesquite Bay from an oil spill in the Gulf. Hurricane Allen partially reopened the pass in 1980, and it was fully opened by dredging in 1988.

== See also ==
- List of rivers of Texas
