= Copano, Texas =

Ghost town in Texas, United States

Coordinates: 28.145908°N 97.130406°W

Copano (Spanish: El Copano) is a ghost town on the northwestern shore of Copano Bay in Refugio County, Texas. It is located 5 mi (8.0 km) north of present-day Bayside, on Copano Point. The port, which holds the distinction as the first in South Texas, was founded in the early 18th century by the Spanish, and named for the Copane Indians who resided in the area. Initially, it was used as a port by smugglers and pirates, until 1785, when it was officially opened for use by the Spanish empire. The port was abandoned in the 1880s, following the settlement of the area after the Texas Revolution. Ruins of the town site can still be found, but are currently in danger of falling into Copano Bay.

== History ==
=== Port usage ===
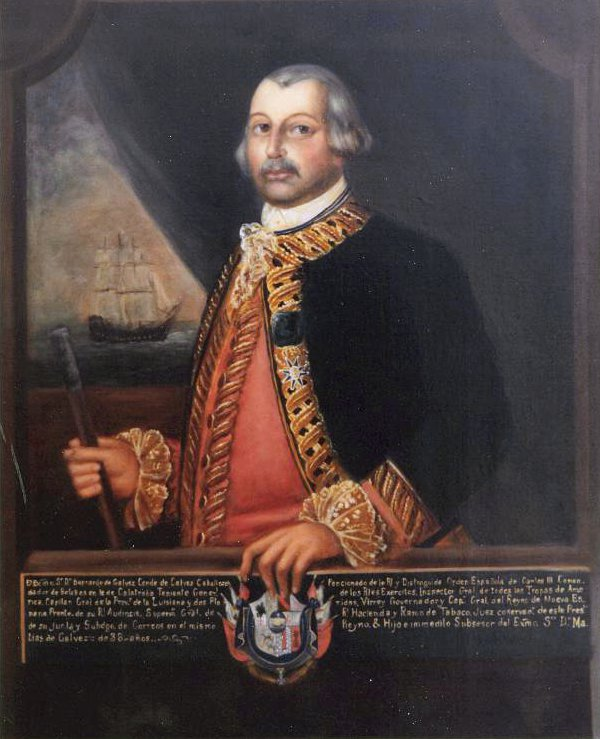
New Spain viceroy Bernardo de Galvez

After its founding, El Copano was a common port used by pirates and smugglers. In 1785, it was officially opened by New Spain Viceroy Bernardo de Gálvez y Madrid, Count of Gálvez for entry into Texas. Around this time, a customshouse and freshwater tank were all that could be found on land, but the port was valued. General Juan Almonte described it as the deepest port on the Texas coast during an 1834 inspection for Antonio López de Santa Anna, and it was described as the "safest" on the coast, due to its protection by Copano Reef. Copano was also used by many Irish emigrants from 1828 to 1835, many of whom landed at the port during their trek from New York City to the Irish colony of San Patricio. At least 200 of these settlers died of cholera upon arrival and were buried on Copano Beach.

During the Texas Revolution, the port was used by both the Mexican and Texian armies. General Martín Perfecto de Cos of Mexico, entered at Copano en route to the missions at San Antonio and Goliad in September 1835. It was fortified by the Texians the following month, and used to transport food and supplies until it was captured by Mexican General José de Urrea in March 1836. The Mexicans held on to the port until the end of the war, and used it to obtain reinforcements and send the injured and prisoners to Mexico. At the end of the war, several Mexican vessels, soldiers, and supplies were taken by the "Horse Marines" led by Texian Major Isaac Burton and the Texas Rangers.

=== Settlement ===
James Power and business partner James Hewetson were granted the land between the Lavaca River and the Nueces River as empresarios in 1825, to create an Irish and Mexican settlement. However, in 1828, the settlement was restricted to only include the area between the Guadalupe River and Lavaca. Although this restriction was reversed in 1829, land disputes with local citizens and hostilities between the Texians and Mexicans prevented any colonization attempts at Copano.

After signing the Texas Declaration of Independence and winning independence from Mexico, Power established a permanent settlement at Copano in 1836. The house of Joseph E. Plummer is believed to be the first of nearly a dozen homes that had been constructed, using oyster-shell concrete (shellcrete) obtained from Copano Beach. Power was completing a two-story house of his own at the site prior to his death in 1852. A school was built, as was a post office, which was used until 1864. Three wharves were built on the bay front to accommodate traders contributing to the prosperity of the settlement; their primary goods included cotton, hides, and tallow.

=== Decline ===
During the American Civil War, Copano continued to flourish, unlike other blockaded Confederate ports, because of its location on a point, which allowed goods to be shipped without being noticed by the Union forces. This came to an end in 1864, when a Union fleet anchored just off Copano, causing the settlers to leave for several days. After several failed attempts to build railroads to Goliad and San Antonio, and trouble maintaining a supply of fresh water, most settlers relocated to Refugio. The abandonment was complete by 1888 after a wave of destructive hurricanes.

== Remains ==
The ruins of Copano can be accessed from the shore of Bayside by watercraft. However, it is currently located on private property owned by the descendants of empresarios. A historical marker was placed at the site in 1936, but was relocated 5 mi (8.0 km) south at Bayside Park, after nearly falling into Copano Bay during a 1978 storm. An archeological survey by the TAMU Kingsville field school in 2005 found a cistern along with 10 shellcrete homes on the edge of a cliff off Copano Bay. The study concluded that the ruins would soon fall into the bay, noting that the shoreline had receded 100 ft (30 m) since 1935. The Plummer residence is believed to have already sunk to the bottom of the bay. Copano is currently named as one of Texas's most endangered historical sites.
