= Lamar, Texas =

- CDP
- Interactive map of Lamar, Texas
- Coordinates: 28°8′25″N 96°59′16″W
- Country: United States
- State: Texas
- County: Aransas

Area
  - Total: 4.9 sq mi (13 km^{2})
  - Land: 3.1 sq mi (8.0 km^{2})
  - Water: 1.8 sq mi (4.7 km^{2})

Population (2010)
  - Total: 636
  - Density: 210/sq mi (79/km^{2})
- Time zone: UTC-6 (Central (CST))
  - Summer (DST): UTC-5 (CDT)
- Zip Code: 78043
- FIPS code: 48-41092

Lamar is a small, unincorporated community and census-designated place (CDP) in Aransas County, Texas, United States, 10 miles (16 km) north of Rockport and 40 miles (64 km) north of Corpus Christi. As of the 2020 census, Lamar had a population of 724. The community was named for Mirabeau B. Lamar, the second president of the Republic of Texas. This was a new CDP for the 2010 census.

Lamar was founded in 1839 at Lookout Point, on the channel entrance to Copano Bay. President Lamar agreed to relocate the custom house here, and the town thrived as a port and the site of a salt works. This prosperity ended abruptly on February 11, 1864, when the town was bombarded and practically obliterated by the Union Navy.

The restored cemetery is a Texas historical landmark. Goose Island State Park is within the CDP.

== Geography ==
Lamar is located at 28°8′25″N 96°59′16″W (28.140340, -96.987818). According to the United States Census Bureau, the CDP has a total area of 4.9 square miles (13 km^{2}), of which 3.1 square miles (8.0 km^{2}) is land and 1.8 square miles (4.7 km^{2}) is water.

== Demographics ==
Historical population
Census	Pop.	Note	%±
2010	636		—
2020	724		13.8%
U.S. Decennial Census; 1850–1900 1910; 1920 1930 1940; 1950 1960 1970; 1980 1990 2000; 2010 2020

Lamar first appeared as a census designated place in the 2010 U.S. census.

Lamar CDP, Texas – Racial and ethnic composition Note: the US Census treats Hispanic/Latino as an ethnic category. This table excludes Latinos from the racial categories and assigns them to a separate category. Hispanics/Latinos may be of any race.
Race / Ethnicity (NH = Non-Hispanic)	Pop 2010	Pop 2020	% 2010	% 2020
White alone (NH)	546	594	85.85%	82.04%
Black or African American alone (NH)	1	0	0.16%	0.00%
Native American or Alaska Native alone (NH)	3	10	0.47%	1.38%
Asian alone (NH)	10	7	1.57%	0.97%
Native Hawaiian or Pacific Islander alone (NH)	0	0	0.00%	0.00%
Other race alone (NH)	1	0	0.16%	0.00%
Mixed race or Multiracial (NH)	5	38	0.79%	5.25%
Hispanic or Latino (any race)	70	75	11.01%	10.36%
Total	636	724	100.00%	100.00%
