= Fulton, Texas =

- Town
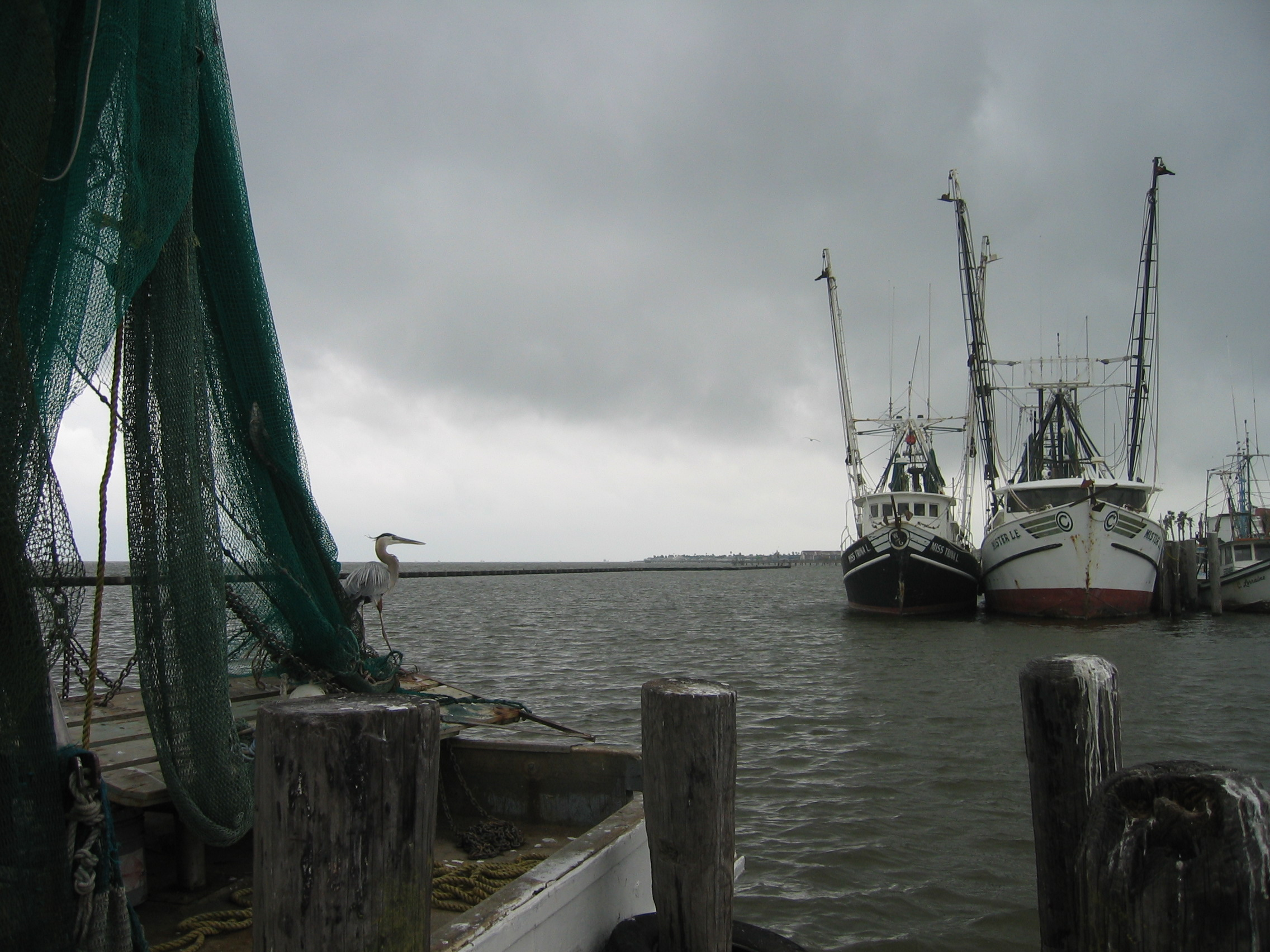
- Fulton harbor

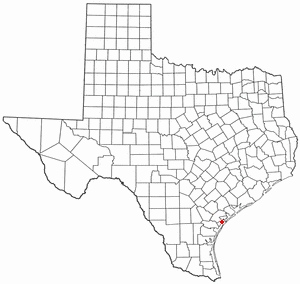
- Location of Fulton, Texas

- Coordinates: 28°4′4″N 97°2′24″W
- Country: United States
- State: Texas
- County: Aransas

Area
  - Total: 2.46 sq mi (6.36 km^{2})
  - Land: 1.41 sq mi (3.64 km^{2})
  - Water: 1.05 sq mi (2.72 km^{2})
- Elevation: 9.8 ft (3 m)

Population (2020)
  - Total: 1,523
  - Density: 1,080/sq mi (418/km^{2})
- Time zone: UTC-6 (Central (CST))
  - Summer (DST): UTC-5 (CDT)
- ZIP code: 78358
- Area code: 361
- FIPS code: 48-27888
- GNIS feature ID: 1336302
- Website: www.fultontexas.org

Fulton is a town in Aransas County, Texas, United States. As of 2026, this South Texas coastal fishing community had a population of 1,655. The town is named for George Ware Fulton, a land developer in the area.

== History ==
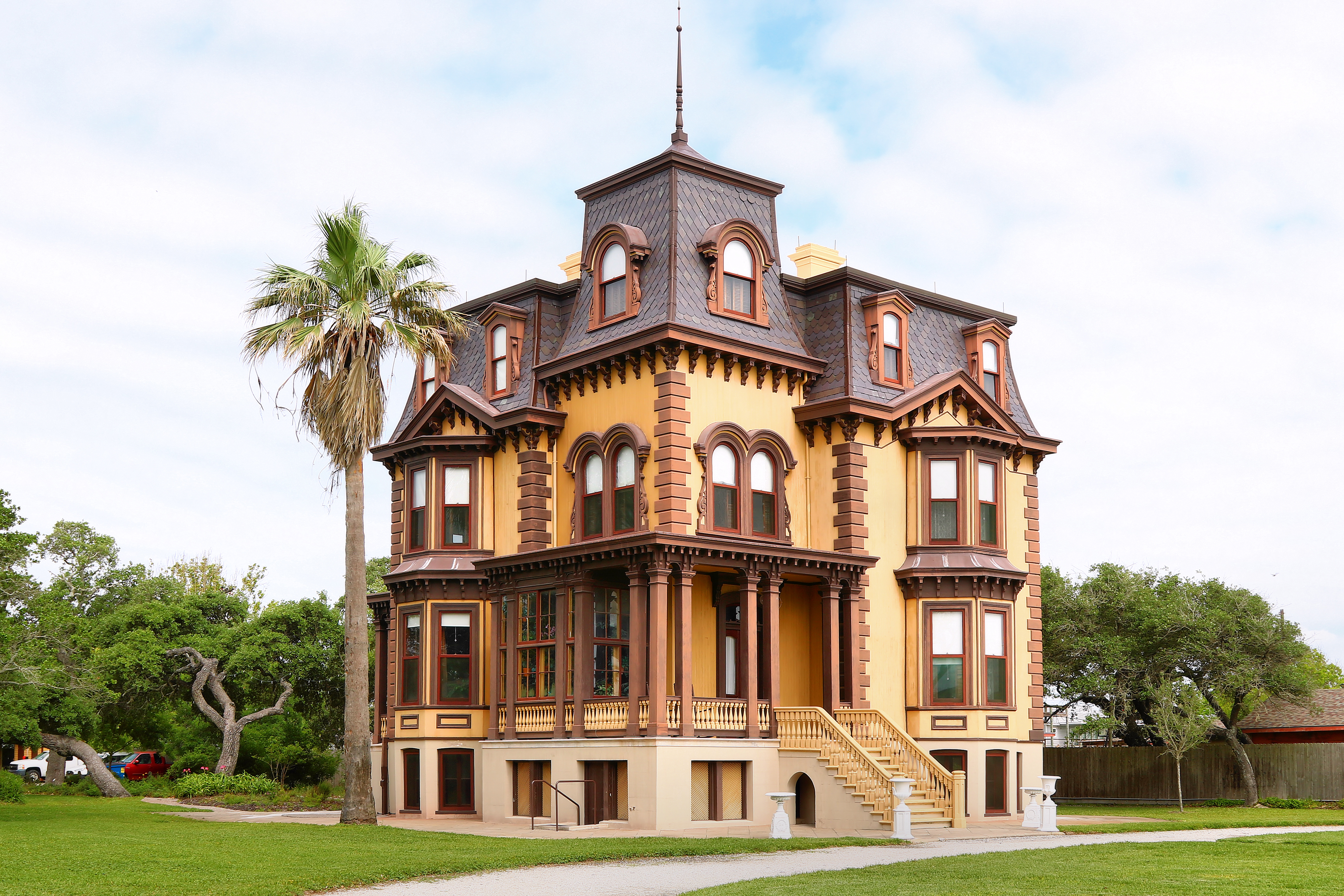
The home of George Ware Fulton, Sr., now a Texas State Historic Site and open to the public.

Fulton was founded in 1866, and named by George Ware Fulton, Sr., whose wife Harriet Smith Fulton inherited 11,000 acres (4,500 ha) on the northern end of the Live Oak Peninsula, including the area where Mr. Fulton created the town he named for himself. Fulton had been a teacher in Indiana and decided to come to Texas by flatboat with 60 other men during the war for independence between Texas and Mexico. After the long trip to Texas, George Fulton found that the war was over but he joined the Army of the Republic of Texas for a few months. He worked for Henry Smith, the first Governor of Texas, and married Smith's daughter, Harriet. They raised a family and moved around the country as George found jobs supervising railroads and building bridges. When Harriet inherited 48,000 acres of the Texas coast, they moved back to live on the Live Oak Peninsula.

After ten years, the Fultons built a large house, now known as the Fulton Mansion, just south of the town. The Fulton's owned thousands of cattle wandering on their extensive lands, and formed a cattle company with others. Mr. Fulton built slaughterhouses and patented a chilled slaughterhouse, the first in the world. The town quickly became the site for many slaughterhouses as cattle from south Texas were driven to Fulton. The cattle slaughterhouses lasted until the 1880s when railroads reached the area and provided ways to ship live cattle to population centers such as Chicago.

In 1930, some evidence of a prehistoric settlement was found in the Fulton area, possibly Karankawan.

On August 25, 2017, Hurricane Harvey made landfall near Fulton at category 4 intensity. It caused significant damage to the town such as destruction to the Fulton Mansions chimney and roof causing water damage on the inside as well. As of the town itself, hotels, homes, and structures were destroyed later causing a 3-5 year recovery from all the debris in the small town of Southeast Texas.

== Geography ==
Fulton is located on the western shore of Aransas Bay. It is bordered to the south by the city of Rockport, the county seat. Texas State Highway 35 passes through the center of the town, leading north across the inlet of Copano Bay. Corpus Christi is 32 miles (51 km) to the southwest, and Port Lavaca is 49 miles (79 km) to the northeast.

According to the United States Census Bureau, the town has a total area of 2.5 square miles (6.4 km^{2}), of which 1.4 square miles (3.6 km^{2}) is land and 1.0 square mile (2.7 km^{2}), or 42.77%, is water.

=== Climate ===
The climate in this area is characterized by hot, humid summers and generally mild to cool winters. According to the Köppen Climate Classification system, Fulton has a humid subtropical climate, abbreviated "Cfa" on climate maps.

Climate data for Fulton, TX
Month	Jan	Feb	Mar	Apr	May	Jun	Jul	Aug	Sep	Oct	Nov	Dec	Year
Mean daily maximum °F (°C)	63.8 (17.7)	66.8 (19.3)	73 (23)	77.8 (25.4)	83.4 (28.6)	88.1 (31.2)	90 (32)	90.4 (32.4)	87.7 (30.9)	81.7 (27.6)	73.6 (23.1)	65.8 (18.8)	78.5 (25.8)
Daily mean °F (°C)	54.8 (12.7)	57.9 (14.4)	64.6 (18.1)	70.3 (21.3)	77 (25)	81.8 (27.7)	83.2 (28.4)	83.4 (28.6)	80.3 (26.8)	73.3 (22.9)	64.9 (18.3)	56.6 (13.7)	70.7 (21.5)
Mean daily minimum °F (°C)	45.5 (7.5)	48.8 (9.3)	56.1 (13.4)	62.8 (17.1)	70.5 (21.4)	75.4 (24.1)	76.3 (24.6)	76.2 (24.6)	72.3 (22.4)	64.6 (18.1)	55.8 (13.2)	47.4 (8.6)	62.6 (17.0)
Average precipitation inches (mm)	3.0 (76)	2.5 (64)	2.4 (61)	2.0 (51)	4.6 (120)	3.8 (97)	3.8 (97)	3.2 (81)	5.6 (140)	4.2 (110)	3.6 (91)	2.3 (58)	41 (1,046)
Average snowfall inches (cm)	0.0 (0.0)	0.0 (0.0)	0.0 (0.0)	0.0 (0.0)	0.0 (0.0)	0.0 (0.0)	0.0 (0.0)	0.0 (0.0)	0.0 (0.0)	0.0 (0.0)	0.0 (0.0)	0.1 (0.25)	0.1 (0.25)
Average precipitation days	8	7	6	4	6	6	6	6	9	6	6	7	77
Average dew point °F (°C)	50 (10)	53 (12)	57 (14)	64 (18)	70 (21)	74 (23)	75 (24)	75 (24)	72 (22)	65 (18)	56 (13)	51 (11)	64 (18)
Mean daily daylight hours	11	11.6	12.4	13.3	14	14.3	14.1	13.5	12.7	11.9	11.2	10.8	12.6
Source: Weatherbase

== Demographics ==
Historical population
Census	Pop.	Note	%±
1980	725		—
1990	763		5.2%
2000	1,553		103.5%
2010	1,358		−12.6%
2020	1,523		12.2%
U.S. Decennial Census

=== 2020 census ===
Fulton racial composition (NH = Non-Hispanic) (Note: Note: the US Census treats Hispanic/Latino as an ethnic category. This table excludes Latinos from the racial categories and assigns them to a separate category. Hispanics/Latinos can be of any race.)
Race	Number	Percentage
White (NH)	1,095	71.9%
Black or African American (NH)	10	0.66%
Native American or Alaska Native (NH)	12	0.79%
Asian (NH)	98	6.43%
Some Other Race (NH)	11	0.72%
Mixed/Multi-Racial (NH)	71	4.66%
Hispanic or Latino	226	14.84%
Total	1,523	

As of the 2020 United States census, there were 1,523 people, 542 households, and 370 families residing in the town.

=== 2000 census ===
As of the census of 2000, there were 1,553 people, 707 households, and 439 families residing in the town. The population density was 1,149.9 inhabitants per square mile (444.0/km^{2}). There were 1,008 housing units at an average density of 746.4 per square mile (288.2/km^{2}). The racial makeup of the town was 84.61% White, 1.16% African American, 0.90% Native American, 8.89% Asian, 0.06% Pacific Islander, 2.25% from other races, and 2.12% from two or more races. Hispanic or Latino of any race were 11.27% of the population.

There were 707 households, out of which 18.2% had children under the age of 18 living with them, 51.5% were married couples living together, 7.1% had a female householder with no husband present, and 37.8% were non-families. 32.1% of all households were made up of individuals, and 16.3% had someone living alone who was 65 years of age or older. The average household size was 2.20 and the average family size was 2.77.

In the town, the population was spread out, with 18.8% under the age of 18, 5.4% from 18 to 24, 21.3% from 25 to 44, 28.0% from 45 to 64, and 26.5% who were 65 years of age or older. The median age was 49 years. For every 100 females, there were 106.0 males. For every 100 females age 18 and over, there were 105.0 males.

The median income for a household in the town was $26,857, and the median income for a family was $30,417. Males had a median income of $25,486 versus $18,750 for females. The per capita income for the town was $15,456. About 11.2% of families and 15.4% of the population were below the poverty line, including 19.8% of those under age 18 and 8.6% of those age 65 or over.

== Parks and recreation ==
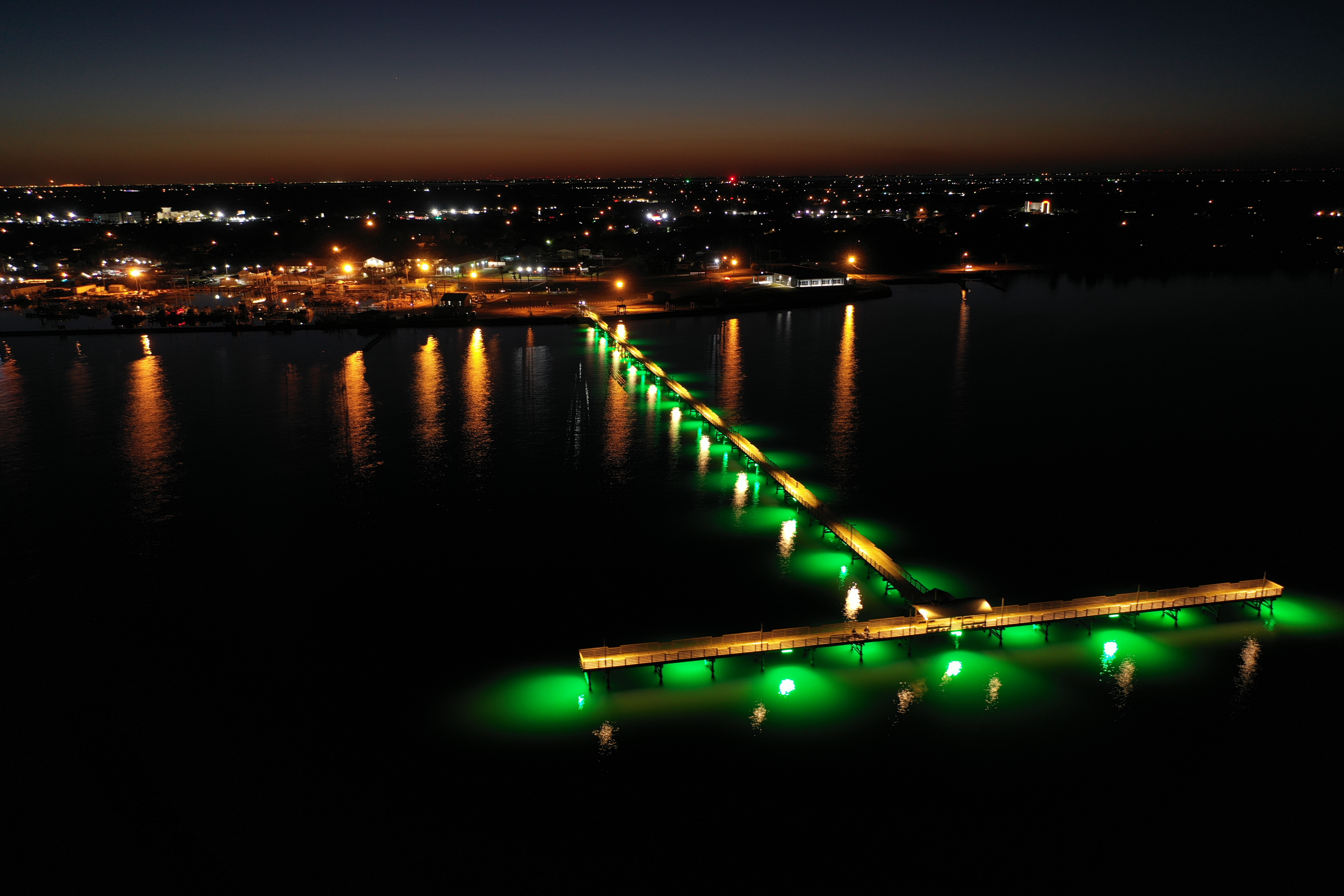
The Fulton Fishing Pier.

Fulton has a 1,500 ft (460 m) wooden fishing pier that extends into Aransas Bay. Rebuilt in early 2021 after being destroyed by Hurricane Harvey, the pier has fishing lights and is wheelchair accessible.

== Education ==
All of Fulton is served by the Aransas County Independent School District.

Pupils are served by the Little Bay Primary School (Rockport, Pre-K–K), Live Oak 1–3 Learning Center (Rockport), Fulton 4–5 Learning Center (Fulton), Rockport-Fulton Middle School (Rockport), and Rockport-Fulton High School (Rockport).

The town is also served by the Aransas County Public Library, located in Rockport.
