= Refugio County, Texas =

County in Texas, United States

- County
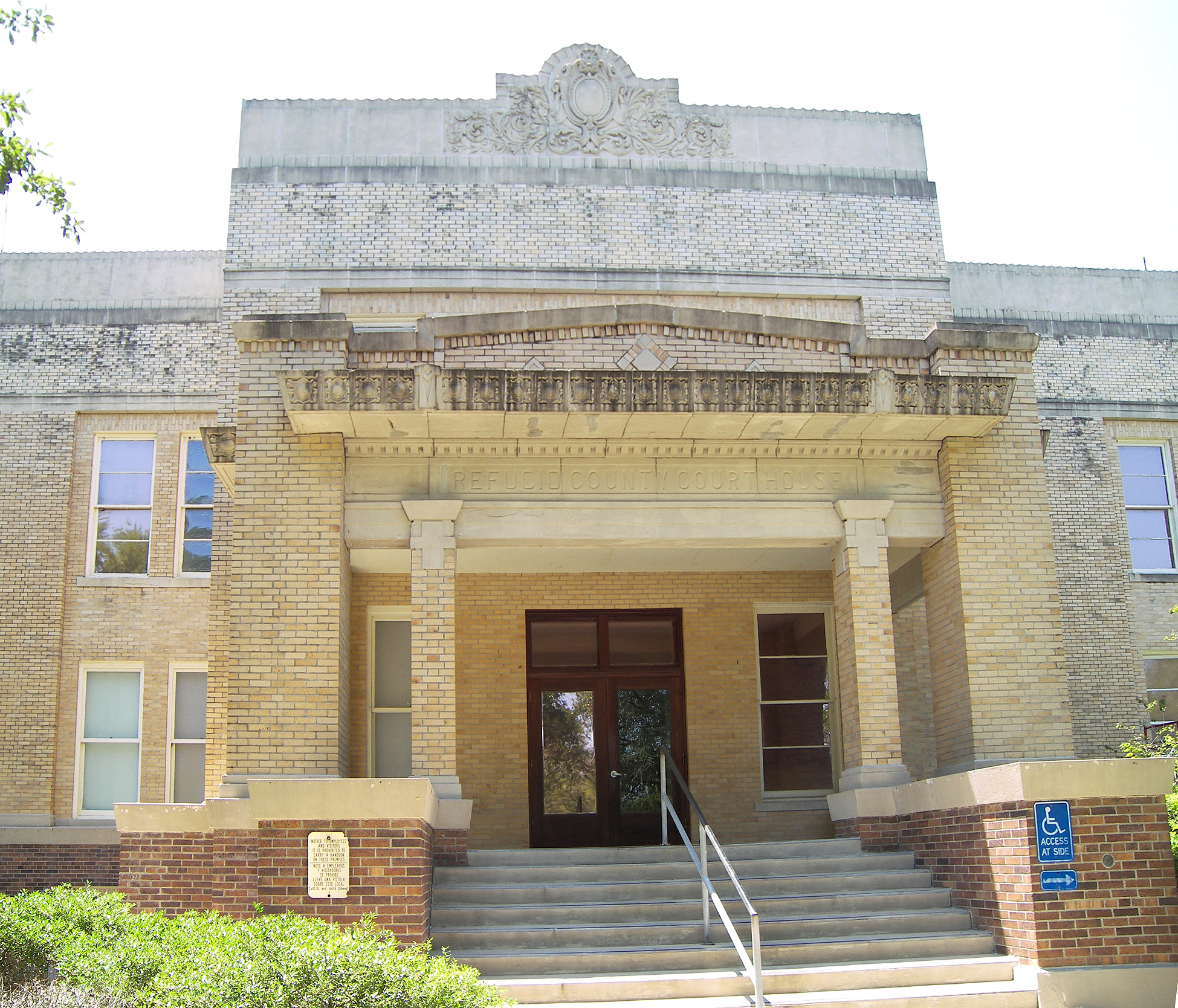
- The Refugio County Courthouse in Refugio

- Location within the U.S. state of Texas
- Coordinates: 28°19′N 97°10′W
- Country: United States
- State: Texas
- Founded: 1837
- Named for: Refugio
- Seat: Refugio
- Largest town: Refugio

Area
  - Total: 818 sq mi (2,120 km^{2})
  - Land: 770 sq mi (2,000 km^{2})
  - Water: 48 sq mi (120 km^{2}) 5.8%

Population (2020)
  - Total: 6,741
  - Estimate (2025): 6,657 ▼
  - Density: 8.8/sq mi (3.4/km^{2})
- Time zone: UTC−6 (Central)
  - Summer (DST): UTC−5 (CDT)
- Congressional district: 27th
- Website: www.co.refugio.tx.us

Refugio County (/rɪˈfjʊər.i.oʊ/ rih-FURE-ee-oh) is a county located in the U.S. state of Texas. As of the 2020 census, its population was 6,741. Its county seat is Refugio. The county originated as a municipality of Mexico in 1834 and was classified as a county in 1837.

== Geography ==
According to the U.S. Census Bureau, the county has a total area of 818 square miles (2,120 km^{2}), of which 48 sq mi (120 km^{2}) (5.8%) are covered by water.

=== Major highways ===
- U.S. Highway 77
  - Interstate 69E is currently under construction and will follow the current route of U.S. 77 in most places.
- U.S. Highway 77 Alternate/U.S. Highway 183
- State Highway 35
- State Highway 239
- Farm to Market Road 136
- Farm to Market Road 774
- Farm to Market Road 2441
- Farm to Market Road 2678

=== Adjacent counties ===
- Victoria County (north)
- Calhoun County (northeast)
- Aransas County (southeast)
- San Patricio County (south)
- Bee County (west)
- Goliad County (northwest)

=== National protected area ===
- Aransas National Wildlife Refuge (part)

== Demographics ==
Historical population
Census	Pop.	Note	%±
1850	288		—
1860	1,600		455.6%
1870	2,324		45.3%
1880	1,585		−31.8%
1890	1,239		−21.8%
1900	1,641		32.4%
1910	2,814		71.5%
1920	4,050		43.9%
1930	7,691		89.9%
1940	10,383		35.0%
1950	10,113		−2.6%
1960	10,975		8.5%
1970	9,494		−13.5%
1980	9,289		−2.2%
1990	7,976		−14.1%
2000	7,828		−1.9%
2010	7,383		−5.7%
2020	6,741		−8.7%
2025 (est.)	6,657	▼	−1.2%
U.S. Decennial Census; 1850–2010 2010–2014

=== 2020 census ===
As of the 2020 census, the county had a population of 6,741. The median age was 45.0 years. 22.2% of residents were under the age of 18 and 22.5% of residents were 65 years of age or older. For every 100 females there were 98.4 males, and for every 100 females age 18 and over there were 97.6 males age 18 and over.

There were 2,632 households in the county, of which 30.8% had children under the age of 18 living in them. Of all households, 46.6% were married-couple households, 21.0% were households with a male householder and no spouse or partner present, and 27.1% were households with a female householder and no spouse or partner present. About 27.3% of all households were made up of individuals and 13.8% had someone living alone who was 65 years of age or older. Those households comprised 1,730 families residing in the county. There were 3,252 housing units, of which 19.1% were vacant. Among occupied housing units, 74.6% were owner-occupied and 25.4% were renter-occupied. The homeowner vacancy rate was 2.3% and the rental vacancy rate was 10.0%.

The racial makeup of the county was 61.9% White, 6.9% Black or African American, 0.5% American Indian and Alaska Native, 0.5% Asian, <0.1% Native Hawaiian and Pacific Islander, 10.6% from some other race, and 19.7% from two or more races. Hispanic or Latino residents of any race comprised 49.0% of the population.

<0.1% of residents lived in urban areas, while 100.0% lived in rural areas.

=== Racial and ethnic composition ===
Refugio County, Texas – Racial and ethnic composition Note: the US Census treats Hispanic/Latino as an ethnic category. This table excludes Latinos from the racial categories and assigns them to a separate category. Hispanics/Latinos may be of any race.
Race / Ethnicity (NH = Non-Hispanic)	Pop 1980	Pop 1990	Pop 2000	Pop 2010	Pop 2020	% 1980	% 1990	% 2000	% 2010	% 2020
White alone (NH)	4,952	4,181	3,703	3,337	2,864	53.31%	52.42%	47.30%	45.20%	42.49%
Black or African American alone (NH)	763	608	521	445	400	8.21%	7.62%	6.66%	6.03%	5.93%
Native American or Alaska Native alone (NH)	7	12	27	25	18	0.08%	0.15%	0.34%	0.34%	0.27%
Asian alone (NH)	7	5	20	27	27	0.08%	0.06%	0.26%	0.37%	0.40%
Native Hawaiian or Pacific Islander alone (NH)	x	x	3	0	0	x	x	0.04%	0.00%	0.00%
Other race alone (NH)	4	6	11	9	12	0.04%	0.08%	0.14%	0.12%	0.18%
Mixed race or Multiracial (NH)	x	x	53	53	114	x	x	0.68%	0.72%	1.69%
Hispanic or Latino (any race)	3,556	3,164	3,490	3,487	3,306	38.28%	39.67%	44.58%	47.23%	49.04%
Total	9,289	7,976	7,828	7,383	6,741	100.00%	100.00%	100.00%	100.00%	100.00%

=== 2000 census ===
As of the 2000 census, 7,828 people, 2,985 households, and 2,176 families resided in the county. The population density was 10 people/mi^{2} (3.9 people/km^{2}). The 3,669 housing units averaged 5 units per square mile (1.9 units/km^{2}). The racial makeup of the county was 80.22% White, 6.77% African American, 0.56% Native American, 0.29% Asian, 10.47% from other races, and 1.67% from two or more races. Hispanics or Latinos of any race were about 48.6% of the population.

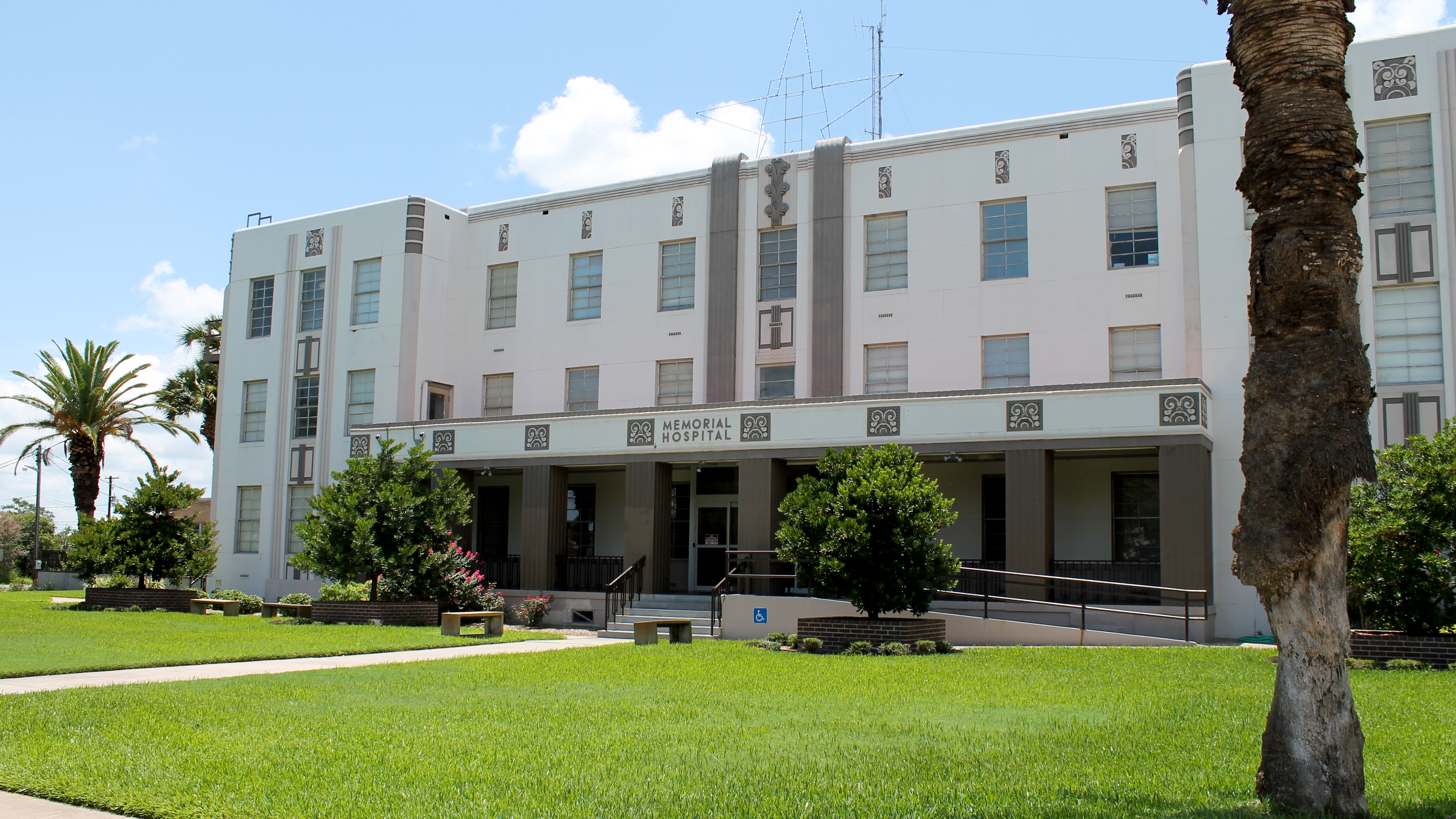
Refugio County Medical Center (2014)

Of the 2,985 households, 31.60% had children under 18 living with them, 55.10% were married couples living together, 12.80% had a female householder with no husband present, and 27.10% were not families. About 24.60% of all households were made up of individuals, and 11.50% had someone living alone who was 65 or older. The average household size was 2.59, and the average family size was 3.07.

In the county, the population was distributed as 26.10% under 18, 7.40% from 18 to 24, 25.90% from 25 to 44, 24.00% from 45 to 64, and 16.60% who were 65 or older. The median age was 39 years. For every 100 females, there were 95.80 males. For every 100 females 18 and over, there were 92.40 males.

The median income for a household in the county was $29,986, and for a family was $36,162. Males had a median income of $29,667 versus $16,565 for females. The per capita income for the county was $15,481. About 14.30% of families and 17.80% of the population were below the poverty line, including 24.20% of those under age 18 and 16.30% of those age 65 or over.

== Oil and gas ==
Commercial gas was first discovered near the town of Refugio in 1920. Oil was first discovered near Refugio in 1928. The Refugio oil and gas field had produced 32 million barrels and 271 billion cubic feet of gas by the end of 1937. A major oil field was discovered at Greta in 1933. The Greta oilfield's estimated cumulative recovery at abandonment are 152.5 million barrels of oil. The largest oilfield in Refugio county, the Tom O'Connor oil field, was discovered in 1934. The Tom O'Connor field's estimated cumulative oil recovery at abandonment is 802.8 million barrels of oil and over 1 trillion cubic feet of gas. Other notable oil and gas fields in Refugio county, at least partially, include Anaqua, Bonnie View, Fagan, Huff, La Rosa, Mary Ellen O'Connor, and McFaddin oil and gas fields.

The Quintana Tom O'Connor No. 1-A discovery well's location was based on a gravity survey and a trend of other fields in the southwest and northeast between the Vicksburg Fault Zone and the Frio Fault Zone. The field is a structural trap formed by an anticline on the downthrown side of the Vicksburg Fault Zone. The faulting is due to "large-scale gravity slumping", and these types of faults are referred to as growth faults, which are normal faults that occur simultaneously with sedimentation. Most of the oil and half the gas is produced at depths between 4500 and 6000 feet, from 15 oil reservoirs and 4 gas reservoirs in the Oligocene Frio Formation sandstones deposited during Marine regression, notably the "5900-foot sand", the "5800-foot sand", the "5500-foot sand" and the "5200-foot sand". Gas with some oil is found above these sandstones in the Oligocene Anahuac Formation, deposited in a Marine transgression, notably the "4400-foot Greta sand". Dry gas is found in the Miocene-Pliocene Fleming sandstones deposited during marine regression, notably the "L-4 sand, which is overlain by 1400 feet of Pleistocene Lissie sandstones.

The last major oil field discovered in Refugio county was the Lake Pasture oil field, discovered in 1953, with an estimated cumulative recovery at abandonment of 104 million barrels of oil.

== Healthcare ==
Medical care is provided to the citizens of Refugio County through a county hospital, several rural health clinics, a wellness clinic, and a specialty clinic. Refugio County Medical Center opened in 1940 due to a surge in the population, and underwent expansions in 1962 and 2009. The hospital was run by religious orders until the 1970s, when Refugio County assumed operations. A hospital district was established in 1977.

== Communities ==
=== Cities ===
- Austwell

=== Towns ===
- Bayside
- Refugio (County seat)
- Woodsboro

=== Census-designated place ===
- Tivoli

=== Ghost towns ===
- Copano
- St. Mary's of Aransas

== Notable residents ==
- Nicholas Fagan - early Refugio county pioneer and active participant in the Texas revolution
- James Power - impresario and early settler of Refugio county
- Thomas O'Connor - active participant in the Texas revolution and later largest land and cattle owner in the state of Texas

== Politics ==
United States presidential election results for Refugio County, Texas
Year	Republican		Democratic		Third party(ies)	
Year	No.	%	No.	%	No.	%
1912	115	29.04%	204	51.52%	77	19.44%
1916	232	33.33%	408	58.62%	56	8.05%
1920	360	55.81%	227	35.19%	58	8.99%
1924	256	27.41%	585	62.63%	93	9.96%
1928	383	36.34%	671	63.66%	0	0.00%
1932	172	12.34%	1,201	86.15%	21	1.51%
1936	242	18.54%	1,058	81.07%	5	0.38%
1940	458	23.46%	1,487	76.18%	7	0.36%
1944	376	25.61%	991	67.51%	101	6.88%
1948	489	22.24%	1,637	74.44%	73	3.32%
1952	1,427	50.39%	1,401	49.47%	4	0.14%
1956	1,355	53.10%	1,188	46.55%	9	0.35%
1960	1,062	37.37%	1,777	62.53%	3	0.11%
1964	772	24.98%	2,319	75.02%	0	0.00%
1968	1,114	33.77%	1,699	51.50%	486	14.73%
1972	1,937	64.57%	1,060	35.33%	3	0.10%
1976	1,537	40.82%	2,218	58.91%	10	0.27%
1980	1,944	45.73%	2,224	52.32%	83	1.95%
1984	2,421	60.71%	1,559	39.09%	8	0.20%
1988	1,883	50.56%	1,831	49.17%	10	0.27%
1992	1,469	39.36%	1,531	41.02%	732	19.61%
1996	1,376	42.35%	1,635	50.32%	238	7.33%
2000	1,721	58.92%	1,172	40.12%	28	0.96%
2004	2,212	64.02%	1,232	35.66%	11	0.32%
2008	1,855	56.88%	1,382	42.38%	24	0.74%
2012	1,663	62.12%	998	37.28%	16	0.60%
2016	1,830	62.08%	1,034	35.07%	84	2.85%
2020	2,210	65.66%	1,108	32.92%	48	1.43%
2024	2,134	69.40%	919	29.89%	22	0.72%

United States Senate election results for Refugio County, Texas1
Year	Republican		Democratic		Third party(ies)	
Year	No.	%	No.	%	No.	%
2024	2,004	66.12%	958	31.61%	69	2.28%

United States Senate election results for Refugio County, Texas2
Year	Republican		Democratic		Third party(ies)	
Year	No.	%	No.	%	No.	%
2020	2,073	65.33%	1,023	32.24%	77	2.43%

Texas Gubernatorial election results for Refugio County
Year	Republican		Democratic		Third party(ies)	
Year	No.	%	No.	%	No.	%
2022	1,658	71.59%	639	27.59%	19	0.82%

Voting results, shown in table, show that Refugio county has become a Republican party stronghold in the 21st century. Prior to the 21st century, Refugio county was primarily a Democratic party stronghold with some exceptions.

== Education ==
School districts include:

- Austwell-Tivoli Independent School District
- Refugio Independent School District
- Woodsboro Independent School District

The portions of the county not in Woodsboro ISD are in the service area of Victoria College. As of 2024 the Texas Education Code does not specify a community college service area for the Woodsboro ISD portion.

== See also ==
- Structural evolution of the Louisiana gulf coast
- List of museums in the Texas Gulf Coast
- National Register of Historic Places listings in Refugio County, Texas
- Recorded Texas Historic Landmarks in Refugio County
