= Aransas County, Texas =

County in Texas, United States

- County
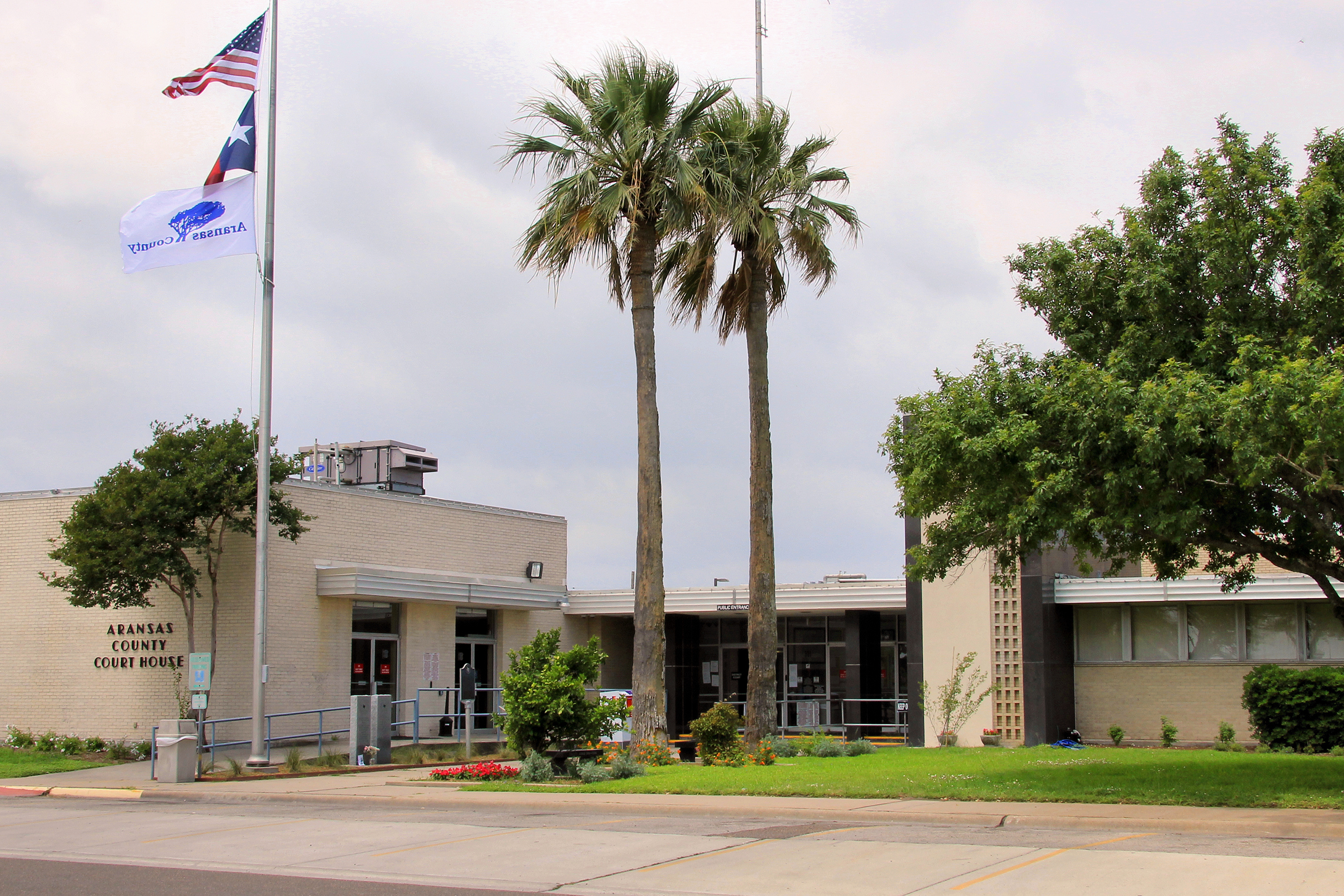
- The Aransas County Courthouse

- Location within the U.S. state of Texas
- Coordinates: 28°06′N 96°59′W
- Country: United States
- State: Texas
- Founded: 1872
- Named for: Aransas Bay
- Seat: Rockport
- Largest city: Corpus Christi

Area
  - Total: 528 sq mi (1,370 km^{2})
  - Land: 252 sq mi (650 km^{2})
  - Water: 276 sq mi (710 km^{2}) 52%

Population (2020)
  - Total: 23,830
  - Estimate (2025): 26,146 ▲
  - Density: 94.5/sq mi (36.5/km^{2})
- Time zone: UTC−6 (Central)
  - Summer (DST): UTC−5 (CDT)
- Congressional district: 27th
- Website: www.aransascountytx.gov

Aransas County (/əˈrænzəs/ ə-RAN-zəss) is a county located in the U.S. state of Texas. It is in South Texas and its county seat is Rockport. As of the 2020 census, its population was 23,830. Aransas County comprises the Rockport, Texas micropolitan statistical area.

== History ==
Spanish conquistador and cartographer Alonso Álvarez de Pineda was likely the first European to encounter this land when he sailed along the Texas coast in the summer of 1519 and charted Aransas Bay. This name is derived from an outpost established during the Viceroyalty of New Spain called "Río de Nuestra Señora de Aránzazu", which was itself named for the Sanctuary of Aránzazu, a Franciscan sanctuary in Oñate, Gipuzkoa, Spain, whose name originates from the Basque language.

In 1871, the Texas Legislature established Aransas County from portions of Refugio County, and it organized the following year.

In August 2017, Hurricane Harvey inflicted tremendous damage on the county.

== Geography ==
According to the U.S. Census Bureau, the county has a total area of 528 square miles (1,370 km^{2}), of which 276 square miles (710 km^{2}) (52%) are covered by water.

=== Adjacent counties ===
- Calhoun County (northeast)
- Gulf of Mexico (east)
- Nueces County (south)
- San Patricio County (southwest)
- Refugio County (northwest)

=== National protected area ===
- Aransas National Wildlife Refuge (part)

== Demographics ==
Historical population
Census	Pop.	Note	%±
1880	966		—
1890	1,824		88.8%
1900	1,716		−5.9%
1910	2,106		22.7%
1920	2,064		−2.0%
1930	2,219		7.5%
1940	3,469		56.3%
1950	4,252		22.6%
1960	7,006		64.8%
1970	8,902		27.1%
1980	14,260		60.2%
1990	17,892		25.5%
2000	22,497		25.7%
2010	23,158		2.9%
2020	23,830		2.9%
2025 (est.)	26,146	▲	9.7%
U.S. Decennial Census; 1850–1900 1910; 1920 1930 1940; 1950 1960 1970; 1980 1990 2000; 2010 2020

=== 2020 census ===
As of the 2020 census, the county had a population of 23,830. The median age was 52.5 years. 16.8% of residents were under the age of 18 and 28.7% of residents were 65 years of age or older. For every 100 females there were 99.5 males, and for every 100 females age 18 and over there were 98.0 males age 18 and over.

The racial makeup of the county was 75.5% White, 1.1% Black or African American, 1.0% American Indian and Alaska Native, 2.1% Asian, 0.1% Native Hawaiian and Pacific Islander, 6.5% from some other race, and 13.6% from two or more races. Hispanic or Latino residents of any race comprised 25.8% of the population.

76.4% of residents lived in urban areas, while 23.6% lived in rural areas.

There were 10,236 households in the county, of which 21.3% had children under the age of 18 living in them. Of all households, 50.2% were married-couple households, 19.8% were households with a male householder and no spouse or partner present, and 23.8% were households with a female householder and no spouse or partner present. About 29.8% of all households were made up of individuals and 15.8% had someone living alone who was 65 years of age or older.

There were 15,500 housing units, of which 34.0% were vacant. Among occupied housing units, 77.5% were owner-occupied and 22.5% were renter-occupied. The homeowner vacancy rate was 3.2% and the rental vacancy rate was 23.8%.

=== Racial and ethnic composition ===
Aransas County, Texas – Racial and ethnic composition Note: the US Census treats Hispanic/Latino as an ethnic category. This table excludes Latinos from the racial categories and assigns them to a separate category. Hispanics/Latinos may be of any race.
Race / Ethnicity (NH = Non-Hispanic)	Pop 1980	Pop 1990	Pop 2000	Pop 2010	Pop 2020	% 1980	% 1990	% 2000	% 2010	% 2020
White alone (NH)	10,950	13,306	16,596	16,350	15,816	76.79%	74.37%	73.77%	70.60%	66.37%
Black or African American alone (NH)	275	301	303	258	241	1.93%	1.68%	1.35%	1.11%	1.01%
Native American or Alaska Native alone (NH)	49	95	104	118	142	0.34%	0.53%	0.46%	0.51%	0.60%
Asian alone (NH)	239	574	614	443	480	1.68%	3.21%	2.73%	1.91%	2.01%
Native Hawaiian or Pacific Islander alone (NH)	x	x	7	5	15	x	x	0.03%	0.02%	0.06%
Other race alone (NH)	25	28	23	21	78	0.18%	0.16%	0.10%	0.09%	0.33%
Mixed race or Multiracial (NH)	x	x	279	273	900	x	x	1.24%	1.18%	3.78%
Hispanic or Latino (any race)	2,722	3,588	4,571	5,690	6,158	19.09%	20.05%	20.32%	24.57%	25.84%
Total	14,260	17,892	22,497	23,158	23,830	100.00%	100.00%	100.00%	100.00%	100.00%

=== 2010 census ===
As of the 2010 census, about 5.9 same-sex couples per 1,000 households lived in the county.

=== 2000 census ===
As of the 2000 census, 22,497 people, 9,132 households, and 6,401 families lived in the county. The population density was 89 people per square mile (34 people/km^{2}). The 12,848 housing units had an average density of 51 units per square mile (20/km^{2}). The racial makeup of the county was 87.44% White, 1.43% Black or African American, 0.58% Native American, 2.77% Asian, 0.05% Pacific Islander, 5.33% from other races, and 2.39% from two or more races. About 20.32% of the population were Hispanics or Latinos of any race.

Of the 9,132 households, 27.0% had children under 18 living with them, 57.0% were married couples living together, 9.4% had a female householder with no husband present, and 29.9% were not families. About 25.3% of all households were made up of individuals, and 11.6% had someone living alone who was 65 or older. The average household size was 2.43 and the average family size was 2.90.

In the county, the age distribution was 23.8% under 18, 6.2% from 18 to 24, 23.2% from 25 to 44, 27.1% from 45 to 64, and 19.7% who were 65 or older. The median age was 43 years. For every 100 females, there were 98.9 males. For every 100 females 18 and over, there were 95.5 males.

The median income for a household in the county was $30,702, and for a family was $34,915. Males had a median income of $31,597 versus $20,289 for females. The per capita income for the county was $18,560. About 15.5% of families and 19.90% of the population were below the poverty line, including 31.0% of those under 18 and 10.2% of those 65 or over.

== Education ==
Most county residents, including the cities of Rockport and Fulton, are served by the Rockport-Fulton Independent School District. Some residents (including the city of Aransas Pass, which is actually outside of the county) are served by the Aransas Pass Independent School District. Del Mar College is the designated community college for the county.

== Transportation ==
=== Major highways ===
- State Highway 35
- State Highway 188
- Loop 70

=== Airport ===
Aransas County Airport is located in Fulton, north of Rockport.

== Communities ==
=== Cities ===
- Aransas Pass (partly in San Patricio and Nueces counties)
- Corpus Christi (mostly in Nueces County with small parts also in Kleberg and San Patricio Counties)
- Rockport (county seat)

=== Towns ===
- Fulton

=== Census-designated places ===
- Holiday Beach
- Lamar

=== Unincorporated communities ===
- Estes
- Palm Harbor

=== Ghost towns ===
- Aransas City

== Government and politics ==
United States presidential election results for Aransas County, Texas
Year	Republican		Democratic		Third party(ies)	
Year	No.	%	No.	%	No.	%
1912	7	3.11%	187	83.11%	31	13.78%
1916	24	11.37%	179	84.83%	8	3.79%
1920	49	25.13%	146	74.87%	0	0.00%
1924	75	26.98%	195	70.14%	8	2.88%
1928	161	51.44%	152	48.56%	0	0.00%
1932	39	12.66%	268	87.01%	1	0.32%
1936	60	21.66%	206	74.37%	11	3.97%
1940	141	20.83%	536	79.17%	0	0.00%
1944	150	24.15%	456	73.43%	15	2.42%
1948	235	34.31%	418	61.02%	32	4.67%
1952	818	61.74%	503	37.96%	4	0.30%
1956	757	63.67%	425	35.74%	7	0.59%
1960	792	45.31%	948	54.23%	8	0.46%
1964	602	28.65%	1,492	71.01%	7	0.33%
1968	1,076	39.63%	1,222	45.01%	417	15.36%
1972	2,037	70.48%	844	29.20%	9	0.31%
1976	1,985	47.48%	2,136	51.09%	60	1.44%
1980	3,081	60.79%	1,800	35.52%	187	3.69%
1984	4,352	71.73%	1,696	27.95%	19	0.31%
1988	3,858	62.27%	2,305	37.20%	33	0.53%
1992	2,826	41.74%	2,246	33.18%	1,698	25.08%
1996	3,769	50.66%	2,964	39.84%	707	9.50%
2000	5,390	65.36%	2,637	31.98%	220	2.67%
2004	6,569	70.88%	2,640	28.49%	59	0.64%
2008	6,693	68.45%	3,006	30.74%	79	0.81%
2012	6,830	70.79%	2,704	28.03%	114	1.18%
2016	7,740	73.63%	2,465	23.45%	307	2.92%
2020	9,239	75.17%	2,916	23.73%	135	1.10%
2024	10,090	77.43%	2,831	21.73%	110	0.84%

United States Senate election results for Aransas County, Texas1
Year	Republican		Democratic		Third party(ies)	
Year	No.	%	No.	%	No.	%
2024	9,605	74.14%	3,069	23.69%	282	2.18%

United States Senate election results for Aransas County, Texas2
Year	Republican		Democratic		Third party(ies)	
Year	No.	%	No.	%	No.	%
2020	9,189	75.54%	2,729	22.44%	246	2.02%

Texas Gubernatorial election results for Aransas County
Year	Republican		Democratic		Third party(ies)	
Year	No.	%	No.	%	No.	%
2022	7,581	78.63%	1,924	19.96%	136	1.41%

=== Commissioners Court ===
Under Texas state law, every county is governed by a commissioners court with one countywide elected judge and four precinct-level elected commissioners. Republicans currently hold all five seats on the Aransas County Commissioners Court.

Current composition of the Aransas County Commissioners Court
Precinct	Name	Affiliation	First elected
Judge	Ray Garza	Republican	2022
1	Jack Chaney	Republican	2008
2	Bubba Casterline	Republican	2006
3	Pat Rousseau	Republican	2020
4	Bob Dupnik	Republican	2022

== See also ==
- List of museums in the Texas Gulf Coast
- National Register of Historic Places listings in Aransas County, Texas
- Recorded Texas Historic Landmarks in Aransas County
