= National Register of Historic Places listings in Aransas County, Texas =

Location of Aransas County in Texas

This list includes properties and districts in Aransas County, Texas, that are listed on the National Register of Historic Places.

This is intended to be a complete list of properties and districts listed on the National Register of Historic Places in Aransas County, Texas. There are one district and six individual properties listed on the National Register in the county. Three individually listed properties are Recorded Texas Historic Landmarks including one that is also a State Historic Site and a State Antiquities Landmark.

This National Park Service list is complete through NPS recent listings posted November 6, 2026.

== Current listings ==
The publicly disclosed locations of National Register properties may be seen in a mapping service provided.

	Name on the Register	Image	Date listed	Location	City or town	Description
1	Aransas Pass Light Station	Aransas Pass Light Station	August 3, 1977 (#77001423)	N of Port Aransas on Harbor Island; 27°51′51″N 97°03′23″W	Port Aransas	Brick lighthouse built in 1857
2	Bracht House	Bracht House	October 11, 2023 (#100009445)	902 East Cornwall St. 28°01′29″N 97°03′08″W	Rockport	
3	George W. Fulton Mansion	George W. Fulton Mansion	April 24, 1975 (#75001945)	Fulton Beach Rd. 28°03′27″N 97°02′05″W	Fulton	State Historic Site, State Antiquities Landmark, Recorded Texas Historic Landmark; Second Empire style house built between 1872 & 1875 for George Ware Fulton.
4	Hoopes-Smith House	Hoopes-Smith House	August 19, 1994 (#94001016)	417 N. Broadway; 28°01′37″N 97°02′59″W	Rockport	Recorded Texas Historic Landmark; Queen Anne style house built between 1890 & 1892 for James M. Hoopes and his family. Now a Bed & Breakfast.
5	Kent-Crane Shell Midden	Kent-Crane Shell Midden	June 21, 1984 (#84001565)	Address restricted	Fulton	41AS3
6	T. H. Mathis House	T. H. Mathis House	June 21, 1971 (#71000918)	612 Church St. 28°01′12″N 97°03′18″W	Rockport	Recorded Texas Historic Landmark; Greek Revival style residence still owned by the same family.
7	Rockport School	Rockport School	February 9, 2024 (#100009945)	619 North Live Oak Street; 28°01′43″N 97°03′09″W	Rockport	

== See also ==
- National Register of Historic Places listings in Texas
- Recorded Texas Historic Landmarks in Aransas County
