= Port Aransas, Texas =

- City
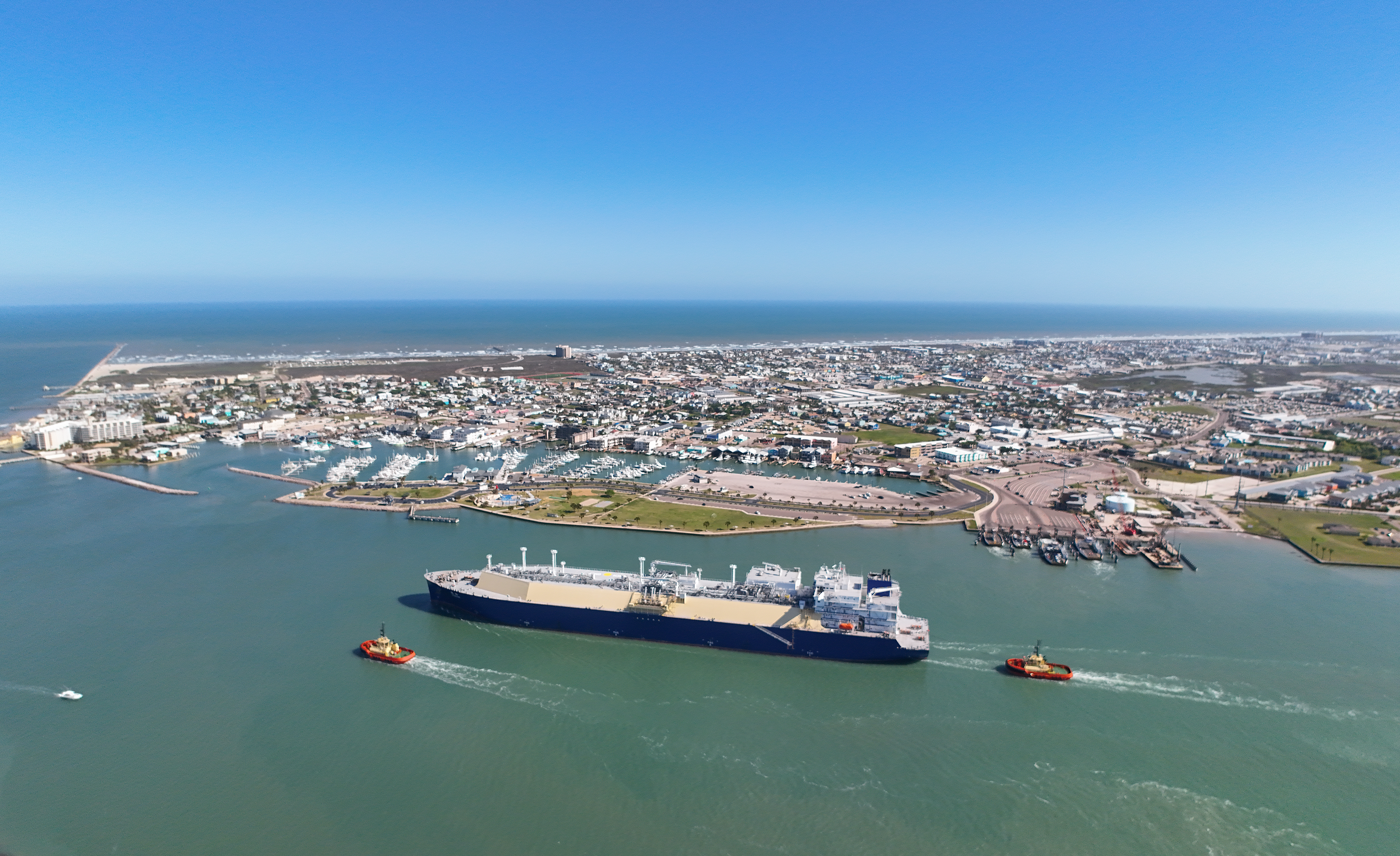
- LNG carrier ship passing by the channel
- Nickname: Port A
- Motto: Always in Season
- Location within Texas Location within the United States
- Coordinates: 27°50′N 97°4′W
- Country: United States
- State: Texas
- County: Nueces

Area
  - Total: 14.07 sq mi (36.44 km^{2})
  - Land: 8.94 sq mi (23.16 km^{2})
  - Water: 5.13 sq mi (13.28 km^{2})
- Elevation: 6.6 ft (2 m)

Population (2020)
  - Total: 2,904
  - Density: 477.0/sq mi (184.16/km^{2})
- Time zone: UTC-6 (Central (CST))
  - Summer (DST): UTC-5 (CDT)
- ZIP code: 78373
- Area code: 361
- FIPS code: 48-58808
- GNIS feature ID: 1344363
- Website: http://www.cityofportaransas.org/

Port Aransas (/əˈrænzəs/ ə-RAN-zəs) is a city in Nueces County, Texas, United States. This city is 180 miles southeast of San Antonio. The population was 2,904 at the 2020 census. Port Aransas is the only established town on Mustang Island. It is located north of Padre Island and is one of the longest barrier islands along the Texas coast. Corpus Christi Bay, the Gulf of Mexico, the Lydia Ann Ship Channel, and the Corpus Christi Ship Channel make up the surrounding waters.

== History ==
=== Early history ===
The Karankawa Indians were living a nomadic existence in the region when Spaniards, led by Alonso Álvarez de Pineda, probed the coast in 1519. Governor Francisco de Garay of Jamaica had commissioned him to explore the Gulf Coast from Florida to Vera Cruz. In the summer of 1519, Piñeda, took a fleet of four ships east to west around the Gulf Coast exploring and mapping five passes along the Texas coastline, including what is known today as Aransas Pass.

In 1720, French explorer Pierre-Jean de Béranger was commissioned to explore St. Bernard Bay "Matagorda Bay" to establish a colony for France along its shores. Jean took an old Spanish ship that had been captured in Florida during the war with Spain, christened it St. Joseph, and his travels resulted in the rediscovery of the Aransas Pass.

In 1739, Governor Prudencio de Orobio y Basterra named the pass Aránzazu Pass on his map of 1739, because it served the Aránzazu fort. The name was altered to Aransas on the map of a Captain Monroe of the ship Amos Wright in 1833.

=== Pirates of Port Aransas ===
Port Aransas was a location of pirates in the early 19th century. From about 1800 to the early 1820s, the Gulf Coast was a haunt of pirate ships searching for riches. Capt. Jean Lafitte and his buccaneers spent time on the Texas coast; Galveston owed its start to him, and Mustang Island was one of his favorite haunts. Capt. Jean Lafitte used Mustang Island as a place to make camp, and according to legend, a place to hide his treasure.

Local lore tells of pirate treasure buried in Port Aransas. The treasure chest is supposedly marked by a Spanish silver dagger. The dagger is believed to be laid on its side with a silver spike driven through the hilt, securing the location.

=== European settlement ===
Mustang Island

The first recorded permanent settler in Port Aransas was Capt. Robert Ainsworth Mercer of Lancaster, England. He established a sheep and cattle ranch known as El Mar Rancho in 1853 or 1855. Herds of wild mustangs rambled over plush rangelands of the island when Mercer first settled there.

By 1854, the Texas Senate sanctioned a seven-mile (11 km) channel from Corpus Christi to the Aransas Pass bar to better serve the Port of Corpus Christi. Also in the 1850s, a regular steamship service route for cargo and passengers was established between New Orleans and Mustang Island. As the pass was brought into permanence, local pilots were needed to guide the ships safely across the bar. For this, permanent structures were required to house the pilots, including docks, a lighthouse, storage, jetties, and a general store.

=== Life Saving Station and the Lighthouse ===
In 1850, the United States Life-Saving Service built the 8th District United States Life Saving Station in Port Aransas. The station was built for the aid and rescue of shipwrecked mariners and was staffed by full-time crews. The Life Saving Station was administered by the United States Revenue Marine (later renamed the United States Revenue Cutter Service) and was run with a volunteer crew, much like a volunteer fire department.

About 1.5 acres (6,100 m^{2}) of land were bought from the State of Texas for $750.00 by the federal government and the Life Saving Station was built on the same site that the United States Coast Guard station stands on today. The Life Saving Station included a dock that stretched from the boathouse into the channel. The boats were hauled onto rails, and pushed into the boathouse when not in use. The small fleet of boats included a 16-foot (4.9 m) skiff, a 24-foot (7.3 m) surf boat, a 26-foot (7.9 m) whale boat, and a 27-foot (8.2 m) whale boat for rough surf.

Designated keeper in charge of the 8th District Life Saving Station on Mustang Island was John G. Mercer. Mercer was also one of the local bar pilots, and was appointed sometime in September 1880.

After the announcement of a regular steamship service route between New Orleans and Port Aransas, the United States Congress commissioned $12,500 for the construction of the Aransas Pass Lighthouse. Haggling over the lighthouse's specifications mired down the process and another survey was done. Meanwhile, the pass slowly moved south, as currents deposited sand on its north bank at the south end of Saint Joseph Island. It was then advised that a lightship be used to mark the pass. More surveying was done, more talk ensued, and then a proposition was accepted to erect a screw-pile lighthouse of brick.

In December 1855, the ship transporting the bricks struck, and then stuck, on the bar. The crewmates were all rescued, but the ship and its cargo went to the bottom of the sea. New bricks arrived in 1856, soon followed by the lantern room that would be set on top, and lastly a fourth order Fresnel lens. Also, a lighthouse keeper's dwelling, a small storage room, and docks were needed. The construction was complete by mid-1857 and the light guided ships through the pass later that year.

The Lydia Ann Channel Lighthouse was deactivated in 1952 after a major channel shift left the station a mile from the channel entrance. To better mark Aransas Pass, a new light was established in 1952 at the Port Aransas Coast Guard Station, and the Aransas Pass Lighthouse was deactivated, just a few years shy of a century of service.

=== The Civil War ===
Around the start of the American Civil War, the lens was taken out of the lantern room of the lighthouse and hidden in the marshlands behind the structure. This lighthouse was of utmost importance because it controlled the night-time pass. Whoever governed the light beacon regulated the night-time passageway. Without that light, the Union ships could only traverse the treacherous pass in the daytime, limiting Union ship movement in the blockade of the coastline.

The harbors in the Corpus Christi, Rockport-St. Marys, Copano Bay area and Mustang and San Jose Islands were all supplying the Confederate Army with beef, salt, seafood, and cotton supplies for the troops fighting the North, and the Union was bent on stopping those shipments. Around November 1861, as expected, the Union Navy started a campaign of coastal blockade. Then, Marines off the Navy vessel USS Afton surged ashore on San Jose Island and leveled the small town of Aransas, burning most of the houses, structures, warehouses, piers, docks, and wharf sometime in February 1862. The small town was all but wiped out, but remnants of it can still be found today. Jurisdiction of the lighthouse traded back and forth between the Confederate and Union detachments throughout the war.

Though Lt. J. W. Kittredge attempted the expropriation of Corpus Christi from the Southern forces, Maj. Alfred M. Hobby and troops sent the Union ships sailing away. By early that summer, Southern civilians had forsaken the islands rather than be under the rule of the North. United States Navy vessels under J. W. Kittredge (before he was captured) besieged the coast, using St. Joseph's Island and the few remaining structures on it as a depot to store captured cotton.

On Christmas Day of 1862, a move was made by Confederate General John B. Magruder, who authorized a detachment of troops to commence the ruination of the lighthouse tower. Gunpowder kegs were clustered inside the tower and lit, resulting in the damaging of 20–25 feet of brickwork, the glass housing case, and the round stairwell.

The next significant stage in the war for this arena was on May 3, 1863, when Capt. Edwin E. Hobby's Confederate company assaulted the Union garrison set to protect the lighthouse and killed 20 soldiers. On May 8, the Confederates once again maintained a battery on Mustang Island; later in the month, they pushed Union forces off St. Joseph's Island. But their victory would not be long lived as the Union comprehended the significance of the pass, and in November, federal troops under T. C. G. Robinson came back and regained control of the island.

=== The Tarpon Inn ===
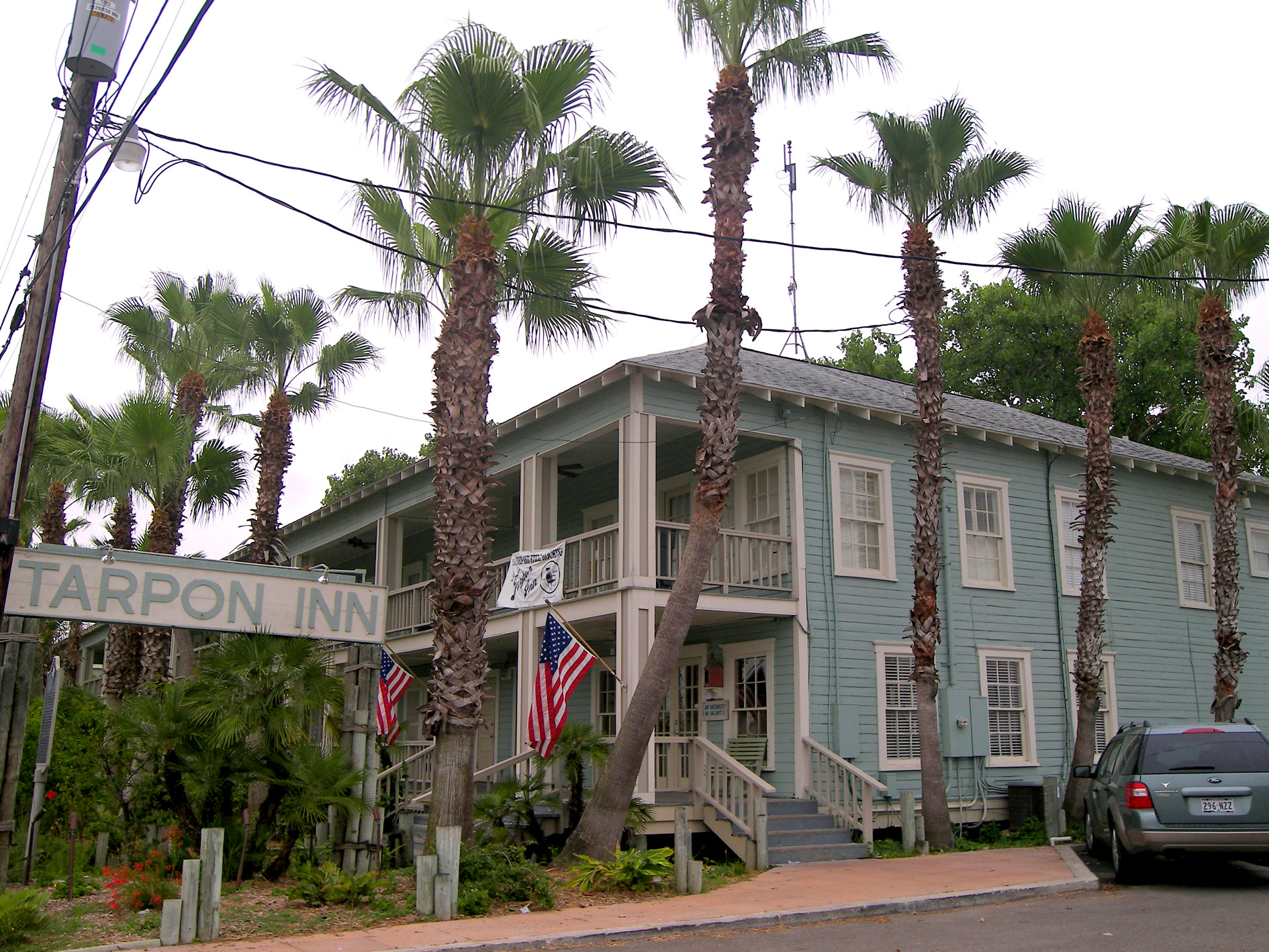
The Tarpon Inn is on the National Register of Historic Places listings in Nueces County, Texas.

The Tarpon Inn was built in 1886 with surplus lumber from Civil War barracks. It was built to house workers building the south jetty (known then as the Mansfield Jetty). In 1886, when the jetty was finished, the structure was converted into a hotel and called the Tarpon Inn. It was opened by Frank Stephenson and sold to Mary Hatfield and her son, Ed Cotter in 1897. After the 1919 hurricane destroyed the main structure, the inn was sold again in 1923 to James M. Ellis, who rebuilt the inn to resemble the old barracks.

When the Tarpon Inn was rebuilt in 1923, many of the new pilings were placed in concrete, with the ends extending up through the entire structure and into the attic. Because the Tarpon Inn was built with impressive reinforcements and a protected shelter, it has housed many residents during storms and has served as headquarters for the Red Cross, the Salvation Army, and military units.

Two of the walls of the Tarpon Inn are covered with tarpon scales. Each of the scales has the signature and hometown of the angler who caught the tarpon and the length, weight, and date of the catch. Some of the people who have stayed at the Tarpon Inn include: President Franklin D. Roosevelt, who fished there in 1937; Duncan Hines, who spent his honeymoon there; Hedy Lamarr; Victor McLaglen; Aimee Semple McPherson; Clyde Beatty; Bob Lilly; and physicist Edward Teller.

In 1979, the Tarpon Inn was listed on the National Register of Historic Places and was recognized as a Texas Historic Landmark.

=== Ropesville ===
Elihu Harrison Ropes, while visiting Galveston Island in 1887, saw the possibility of the development of a deep-water port on the Texas coast, and looked to Corpus Christi as the state's first much-needed deep-vessel port of call. After exploring Mustang Island, Ropes proclaimed a plan to excavate a channel through the island. To complete the venture, Ropes founded the Port Ropes Company. Mr. Ropes paid $25,000 for Mustang Island and purchased a dredge to dig the channel. In June 1890, Mr. Ropes launched the project to build a channel across the island to give the port of Corpus Christi a direct connection with the deep water of the Gulf of Mexico. By the end of 1891, however, the project was terminated due to many problems.

In 1888, the town's first official post office was established under the name Ropesville. This first official name of what is now Port Aransas did not last for long.

In 1890, the Aransas Pass & Harbor Company, under government contracts, launched a plan to deepen the channel through the pass and over the sandbar. The plan called for the construction of two new jetties, but the plan failed to increase the depth of the channel. Another plan was put into action, calling for the blasting of the channel with thousands of pounds of dynamite, but this also failed. The newest jetties, and shallow draft would have to stay as they were for the time being.

In 1896, the name was changed to Tarpon because of the abundant game fish that filled the waters around it. The population at that time was about 250. The Rivers and Harbors Act of 1899 called for the elimination of the old Mansfield Jetty "south jetty". The project was finished by 1911; while this was still going on, and after several private and government endeavors failed to produce a deep-water pass between Mustang and St. Joseph islands, the United States Army Corps of Engineers took over the project in 1907, and was granted the right to build a new south "Nelson" jetty and to unite the "Haupt jetty" to St. Joseph Island that same year.

=== 1916 Texas Hurricane ===
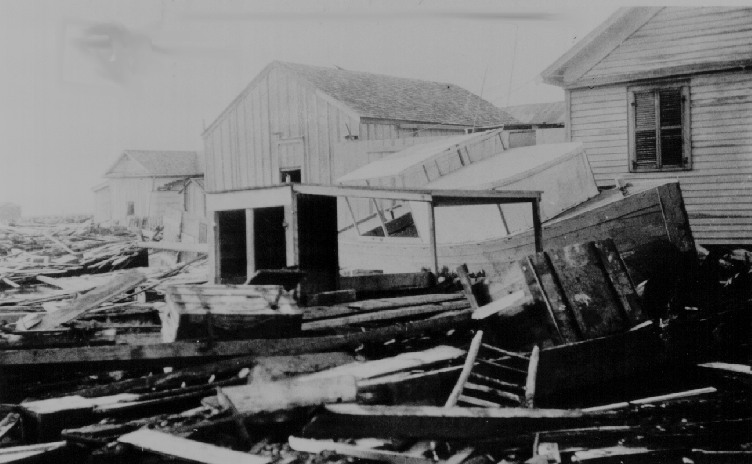
Storm surge damage from the 1916 hurricane

The 1916 Texas Hurricane destroyed Port Aransas except for a few buildings. The docks, wharf, and warehouses were now on the mainland, and the island was flooded and infested with rattlesnakes. The destruction of the 1916 Texas hurricane did not discourage the people of Port Aransas for very long. The Tarpon Inn was rebuilt and the docks, wharves, and warehouses were replaced. After the city was rebuilt, it became a destination for anglers, tourists, surfers, and vacationers.

=== Transportation to and from Port Aransas ===
A United States Census taken in 1925 showed 250 people living on the island, and a population of 300 by 1931. A toll road was opened in 1931 between the town of Aransas Pass and the ferry landing of Port Aransas. Before the toll road, a driver bought a ticket, loaded the vehicle onto a flatbed or train, and used the wooden planks inside the rails when the train was not on a scheduled run. With the advent of the toll road, drivers could simply pay a toll and drive on a wooded plank structure built next to the rail tracks. After the railroad closed in 1947, it was used only to transport automobiles until 1960, when the state built a modern road to Harbor Island from Corpus Christi and the ferry landing.

Today the Port Aransas Ferry System provides free transportation service 24 hours a day, seven days a week. The service connects Mustang Island and Port Aransas with the mainland of Aransas Pass. The number of boats in service at any one time depends on demand. Three boats carry 20 regular passenger vehicles, and five new larger ferries carry 28 passenger vehicles each trip. During peak hours, some travelers may need to wait while the ferry makes the trip across the channel. A 24-hour radio message (AM 530) provides information about ferry regulations and can be used for live broadcasts for emergency situations. A maximum vehicle height of 13 feet 6 inches is allowed. A maximum vehicle width of 96 inches is allowed. The maximum weight limit is 80,000 pounds. Peak months include June, July, and August. The ferry system is maintained by the Texas Department of Transportation.

=== The University of Texas Marine Science Institute ===
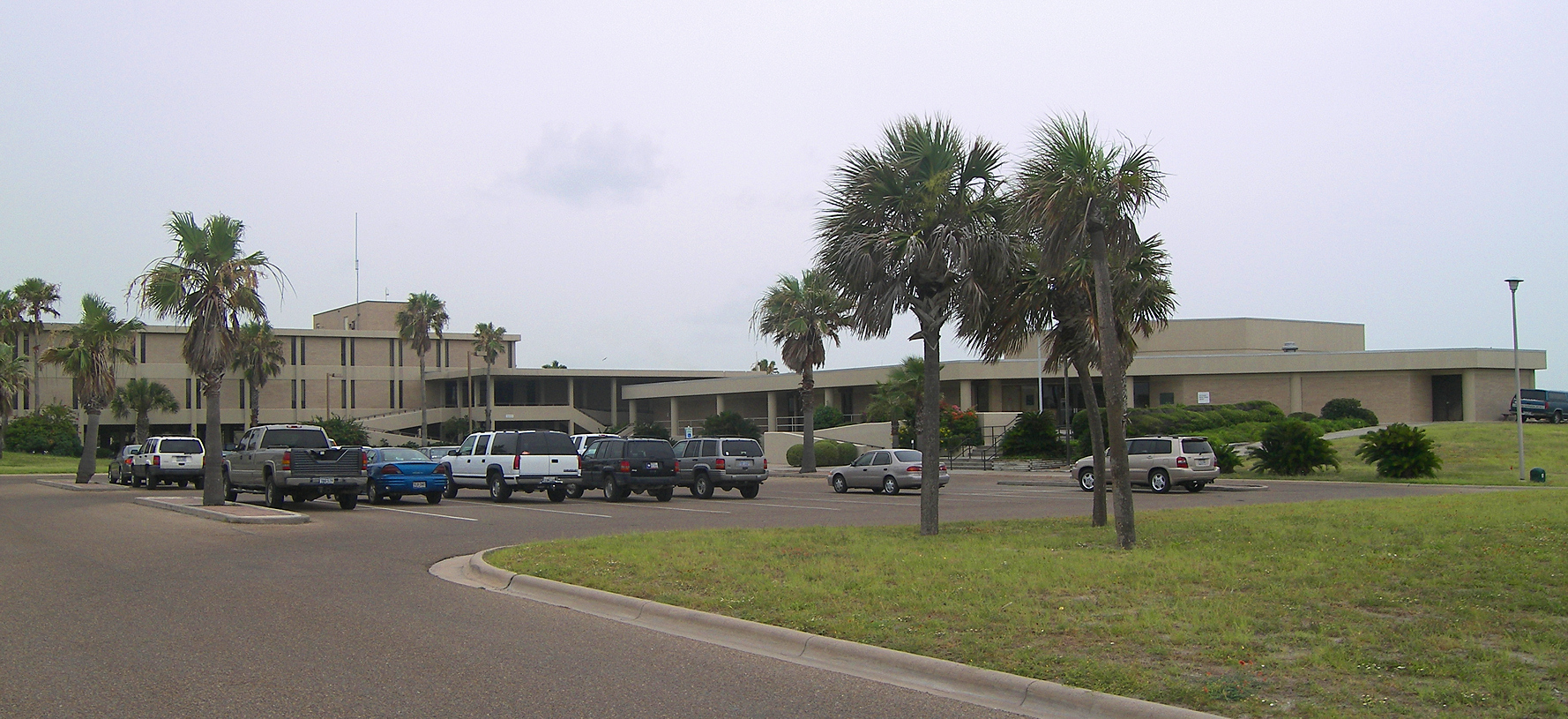
The Marine Science Institute and Visitor Center in 2007

In 1935, Dr. E. J. Lund, a zoologist from the University of Texas, traveled to Port Aransas to investigate a massive fish kill. He constructed a small, rough lumber, one-room shack on the old Corps of Engineers dock. Dr. Lund recognized the value of the local environment and the need for public education about the natural resources of the Gulf of Mexico and gradually rekindled interest in marine science at the university.

In 1941, The University of Texas Marine Science Institute was formed with Dr. Lund as the first director. Research began in the old pier building with one of the first projects being on the distribution, life history, and abundance of marine fishes of Texas, by Dr. Lund and Dr. Gordon Gunter, who was Lund's student and later followed Lund as director. Gunter also undertook a study for the U.S. Navy on the problem of fouling on ships' bottoms.

With the end of the war, development of the institute resumed. Lund purchased and donated 12 acres (49,000 m^{2}). The old Army Corps of Engineers building, constructed in 1890 and veteran of several hurricanes, was included. This building is still there today and serves as a dormitory where students relax on an old-fashioned porch and watch ships and dolphins almost at the doorstep on the Aransas Pass.

In 1946, the first permanent marine laboratory was established in Port Aransas, Texas. Two frame buildings were constructed, which still serve as the cafeteria and a dormitory, and a full-time staff was in residence. A laboratory was built on the pier in 1948 and major expansion of physical facilities took place in the 1970s with the acquisition of 49 acres (200,000 m^{2}) of land, additional laboratories, dormitory, apartments, maintenance complex, and a 5 1/4-acre boat basin.

=== Port Aransas during World War II ===
During World War II, an artillery gun turret was erected by the United States Army and maintained throughout the war, on a high dune just off Cotter St. across from the UT campus, and is now part of the UT properties. It was placed to protect the pass from sightings of German U-boats. Blackouts were called on all the island during nighttime hours, no fires on the beach or car lights, and house windows could not show light and had to be covered with heavy curtains, blankets, or wood.

=== The Farley Boat and Port Aransas ===
In the early 20th century, tarpon fishing began to attract anglers and tourists from across America to Port Aransas. Because of the choppy waters around Port Aransas, though, access to the Gulf Coast was restricted. The boats of the day were not designed to handle the rough Gulf Coast waters and storms in the early 20th century wiped out the existing charter fleet.

To meet the needs of anglers coming from across the country to fish for tarpon, the Farley family began building the Farley boat. In 1915, Charles Frederick ("Fred") Farley and his son established Farley and Son, Boat Builders, in Port Aransas. The Farley boats were designed to meet the needs of anglers and fishing guides. They were designed with low sides and a high bow to fight the choppy waves. The Farley boats were also designed with low cabins that allowed fishing in every direction.

In 1937, President Franklin D. Roosevelt visited Port Aransas and while Congress was debating his Judiciary Reorganization Bill of 1937, he fished for tarpon. He hired Barney Farley, the famous fishing guide and brother of Fred Farley.

The president brought his own 35-foot (11 m) fishing boat and Barney Farley agreed to take the president out on the boat. After an unsuccessful outing, Barney Farley convinced the president to fish from a Farley boat, but his nephew, Don Farley, would take him. Though he had a successful outing, Don said, "I can't believe he caught so many because of the secret service running around on boats in the water." The president caught so many tarpon that he returned to Port Aransas later that year to again fish with Barney Farley on a Farley boat.

Today, Farley boat planters are located all over the city of Port Aransas, celebrating the history and importance of the Farley boat along the Gulf Coast.

=== Hurricane Harvey ===
Port Aransas suffered major damage as a result of the landfall of Hurricane Harvey in August 2017, with wind speeds of 132 mph (212 km/h, 59 m/s) being recorded.

=== Modern day ===
Port Aransas has now become a fishing, beach, and resort village, with summer populations sometimes swelling to 60,000 or more, as well as a college spring-break destination. Every year in April, Port Aransas hosts an event called Sand Fest, which brings thousands of people to Port Aransas to watch sculptors build elaborate sand castles. The event has food vendors, shopping, and live music. All of the money raised from the event goes to the community and local schools.

== Geography ==
According to the United States Census Bureau, the city has a total area of 12.1 square miles (31 km^{2}), of which 3.3 square miles (8.5 km^{2}) (27.01%) are covered by water. Port Aransas is located at 27°49′39″N 97°4′20″W (27.827373, –97.072205).

=== Climate ===
Port Aransas experiences a humid subtropical climate, enjoying similar temperatures to those of other Gulf Coast regions, such as Deep South Texas and South Florida. The area experiences an average annual rainfall of 35.55 inches (903 mm), with prevailing winds out of the southeast from the Gulf of Mexico.

Climate data for Port Aransas, Texas, 1991–2020 normals, extremes 1986–present
Month	Jan	Feb	Mar	Apr	May	Jun	Jul	Aug	Sep	Oct	Nov	Dec	Year
Record high °F (°C)	81 (27)	87 (31)	89 (32)	94. (34)	99 (37)	98 (37)	94 (34)	99 (37)	101 (38)	95 (35)	94 (34)	82 (28)	101 (38)
Mean maximum °F (°C)	74.2 (23.4)	75.9 (24.4)	80.2 (26.8)	85.3 (29.6)	88.8 (31.6)	91.7 (33.2)	91.9 (33.3)	93.7 (34.3)	92.9 (33.8)	88.7 (31.5)	82.8 (28.2)	77.3 (25.2)	95.0 (35.0)
Mean daily maximum °F (°C)	62.3 (16.8)	64.9 (18.3)	70.1 (21.2)	75.8 (24.3)	81.4 (27.4)	86.8 (30.4)	88.0 (31.1)	88.7 (31.5)	86.5 (30.3)	81.2 (27.3)	71.8 (22.1)	65.3 (18.5)	76.9 (24.9)
Daily mean °F (°C)	56.4 (13.6)	59.3 (15.2)	65.1 (18.4)	71.2 (21.8)	77.3 (25.2)	82.5 (28.1)	83.8 (28.8)	84.3 (29.1)	81.6 (27.6)	76.0 (24.4)	66.3 (19.1)	59.2 (15.1)	71.9 (22.2)
Mean daily minimum °F (°C)	50.4 (10.2)	53.7 (12.1)	60.1 (15.6)	66.6 (19.2)	73.2 (22.9)	78.1 (25.6)	79.6 (26.4)	79.9 (26.6)	76.8 (24.9)	70.7 (21.5)	60.9 (16.1)	53.0 (11.7)	66.9 (19.4)
Mean minimum °F (°C)	36.8 (2.7)	40.4 (4.7)	44.9 (7.2)	54.0 (12.2)	64.1 (17.8)	71.3 (21.8)	74.6 (23.7)	75.3 (24.1)	67.7 (19.8)	56.0 (13.3)	44.5 (6.9)	37.9 (3.3)	33.7 (0.9)
Record low °F (°C)	24 (−4)	26 (−3)	33 (1)	42 (6)	53 (12)	65 (18)	68 (20)	70 (21)	57 (14)	42 (6)	33 (1)	12 (−11)	12 (−11)
Average precipitation inches (mm)	2.11 (54)	1.92 (49)	2.42 (61)	2.00 (51)	3.99 (101)	3.72 (94)	2.57 (65)	1.80 (46)	6.51 (165)	3.92 (100)	2.88 (73)	1.71 (43)	35.55 (902)
Average precipitation days (≥ 0.01 in)	8.9	8.6	7.0	5.3	5.0	5.3	4.4	4.8	9.7	6.9	7.1	8.3	81.3
Source 1: NOAA
Source 2: National Weather Service

== Demographics ==
Historical population
Census	Pop.	Note	%±
1940	495		—
1950	551		11.3%
1960	824		49.5%
1970	1,218		47.8%
1980	1,968		61.6%
1990	2,233		13.5%
2000	3,370		50.9%
2010	3,480		3.3%
2020	2,904		−16.6%
U.S. Decennial Census 2020

=== Racial and ethnic composition ===
Port Aransas city, Texas – Racial and ethnic composition Note: the US Census treats Hispanic/Latino as an ethnic category. This table excludes Latinos from the racial categories and assigns them to a separate category. Hispanics/Latinos may be of any race.
Race / Ethnicity (NH = Non-Hispanic)	Pop 2000	Pop 2010	Pop 2020	% 2000	% 2010	% 2020
White alone (NH)	3,046	3,084	2,498	90.39%	88.62%	86.02%
Black or African American alone (NH)	12	9	4	0.36%	0.26%	0.14%
Native American or Alaska Native alone (NH)	35	31	12	1.04%	0.89%	0.41%
Asian alone (NH)	29	43	38	0.86%	1.24%	1.31%
Native Hawaiian or Pacific Islander alone (NH)	1	3	2	0.03%	0.09%	0.07%
Other race alone (NH)	5	1	22	0.15%	0.03%	0.76%
Mixed race or Multiracial (NH)	37	41	114	1.10%	1.18%	3.93%
Hispanic or Latino (any race)	205	268	214	6.08%	7.70%	7.37%
Total	3,370	3,480	2,904	100.00%	100.00%	100.00%

=== 2020 census ===
As of the 2020 census, Port Aransas had a population of 2,904, with 1,400 households and 1,314 families residing in the city. The median age was 55.6 years; 12.2% of residents were under the age of 18 and 30.4% were 65 years of age or older. For every 100 females there were 102.4 males, and for every 100 females age 18 and over there were 100.2 males age 18 and over.

99.2% of residents lived in urban areas, while 0.8% lived in rural areas.

Of the 1,400 households in Port Aransas, 20.6% had children under the age of 18 living in them. Of all households, 48.4% were married-couple households, 21.2% were households with a male householder and no spouse or partner present, and 24.4% were households with a female householder and no spouse or partner present. About 31.2% of all households were made up of individuals and 14.7% had someone living alone who was 65 years of age or older.

There were 4,852 housing units, of which 71.1% were vacant. The homeowner vacancy rate was 3.2% and the rental vacancy rate was 41.3%.

Racial composition as of the 2020 census
Race	Number	Percent
White	2,570	88.5%
Black or African American	4	0.1%
American Indian and Alaska Native	15	0.5%
Asian	38	1.3%
Native Hawaiian and Other Pacific Islander	2	0.1%
Some other race	60	2.1%
Two or more races	215	7.4%

=== 2000 census ===
As of the census of 2000, 3,370 people, 1,542 households, and 993 families were residing in the city. The population density was 382.5 inhabitants per square mile (147.7/km^{2}). The 3,794 housing units had an average density of 430.6 per square mile (166.3/km^{2}). The racial makeup of the city was 93.92% White, 0.42% African American, 1.25% Native American, 0.86% Asian, 2.20% from other races, and 1.36% from two or more races. Hispanics or Latinos of any race were 6.08% of the population.

Of the 1,542 households, 22.6% had children under 18 living with them, 53.6% were married couples living together, 7.3% had a female householder with no husband present, and 35.6% were not families. About 29.1% of all households were made up of individuals, and 8.7% had someone living alone who was 65 or older. The average household size was 2.18, and the average family size was 2.64.

In the city, the age distribution was 18.9% under 18, 5.7% from 18 to 24, 25.2% from 25 to 44, 34.6% from 45 to 64, and 15.7% who were 65 or older. The median age was 45 years. For every 100 females, there were 108.4 males. For every 100 females 18 and over, there were 106.6 males. The median income for a household in the city was $39,432, and for a family was $46,719. Males had a median income of $28,000 versus $22,393 for females. The per capita income for the city was $23,681. About 7.1% of families and 11.3% of the population were below the poverty line, including 17.4% of those under 18 and 3.5% of those 65 or over.

== Economy ==
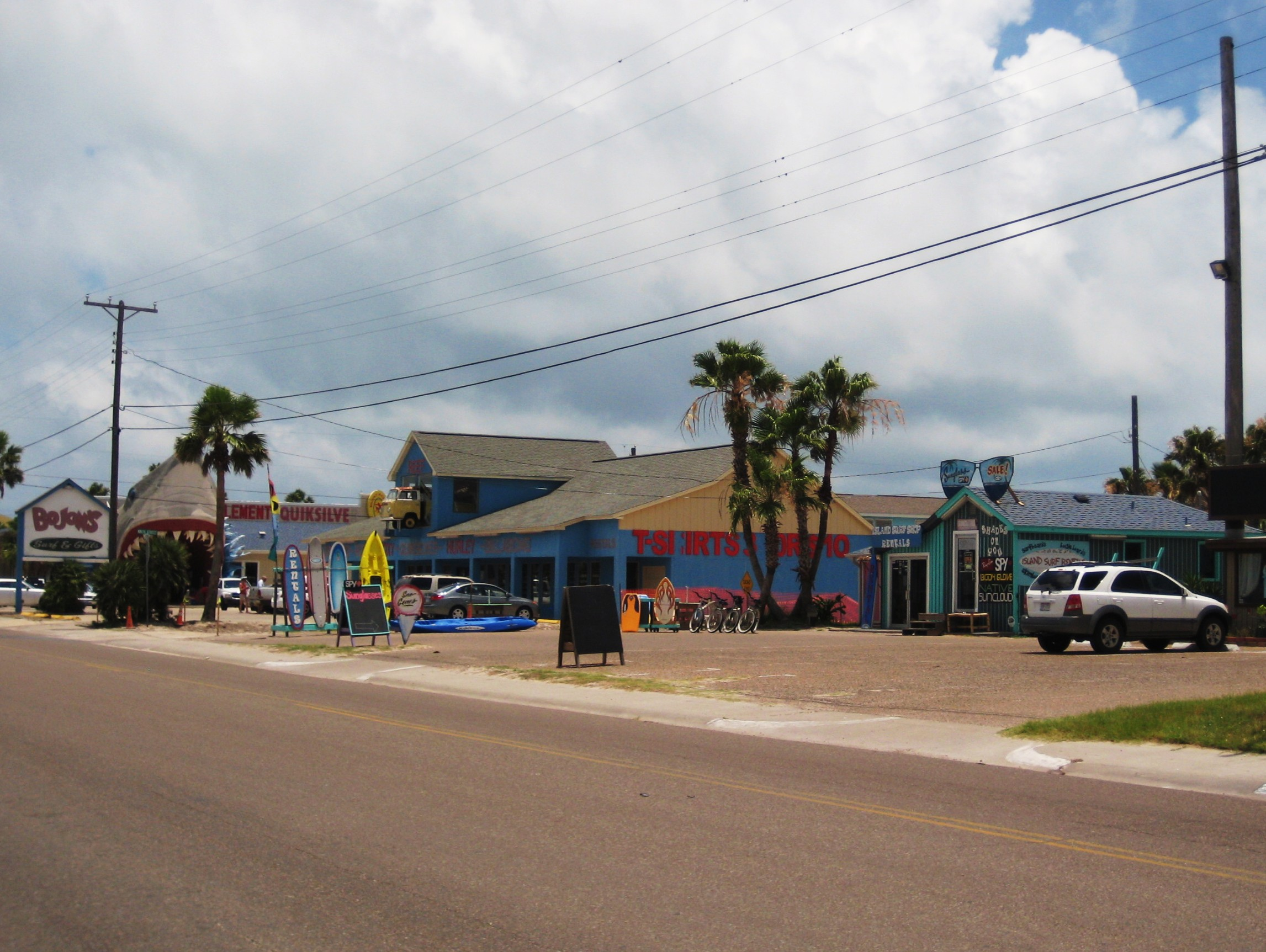
Tourist shops at Port Aransas

Around 1900, the village was doing big business in sea turtle export. Fishing has always been a staple, especially sport fishing for spotted seatrout and redfish. Some 600+ species of saltwater fish are thought to inhabit the waters off Port Aransas. The fishing industry is still lively in the city, though local battles exist between the Recreational Fishing Alliance and the Coastal Conservation Association. Tourism is the largest section of the economy. The beach at Port Aransas draws thousands of visitors each weekend from Memorial Day through Labor Day.

The Port Aransas economy is increasingly focusing on ecotourism. Bird-viewing locations have been established by the city and state agencies. Kayak paddling trails established by the state also contribute to ecotourism. Port Aransas has begun the construction of a natural preservation area that will provide hiking trails and other nature-related tourist activities.

== Education ==
Port Aransas public schools are operated by the Port Aransas Independent School District. H.G. Olsen Elementary School, Brundrett Middle School, and Port Aransas High School serve the city.

== Notable people ==
- Dianna Hutts Aston, American children's author (The Moon Over Star)
- Aline B. Carter, American poet and humanitarian
- Steven A. Hickham Jr., American racing driver (originally from Corpus Christi)
- Clinton Manges, American oil tycoon (originally from Cement, Oklahoma)
- Tom Pauken, Texas lawyer and politician, candidate for governor in the Republican primary election on March 4, 2014
- Ryan Rose, Republican State Representative in the Arkansas House of Representatives
