= Dianna Hutts Aston =

American writer

- Born: August 12, 1964 (age 61) Houston, Texas
- Genre: Children's literature, Picture books

Dianna Hutts Aston (born August 12, 1964) is an American author specializing in books on science and nature, especially for children. She attended the University of Houston to study Journalism and Political Science. She has gained acclaim in literary and science circles for her 'poetic' style. She collaborates with illustrators that produce bright colorful images. She has appeared as an expert guest on NPR's Science Friday. Among her many awards and citations, she has been a finalist and winner of the AAAS/Subaru SB&F Prize for Excellence in Science Books several times. President Barack Obama and First Lady Michelle Obama chose her book "The Moon Over Star" to read to a Washington DC classroom in February 2009.

In addition to her writing, Aston has initiated social outreach programs: The Oz Project for disadvantaged Mexican children, SOS Message in a Bottle Project and This is America for victims of violent crimes. Aston makes her home in Port Aransas, Texas.

== Bibliography ==
Date	Book Name	Details
2017	A Beetle is Shy	Published by Chronicle Books; ISBN 1452127123
2015	A Nest is Noisy	Published by Chronicle Books; ISBN 1452161356
2015	A Butterfly is Patient	ISBN 9781452141244
2015	A Rock is Lively	ISBN 9781452131481
2014	An Egg is Quiet	ISBN 9781452145556
2011	Dream Something Big	ISBN 9780803732452
2008	The Moon Over Star	Published by Dial Books; ISBN 0803731078
2008	Not So Tall For Six	ISBN 9781570917059
2007	An Orange in January	ISBN 9780803731462
2007	A Seed is Sleepy	ISBN 9781452131474
2006	Mama Outside, Mama Inside	ISBN 9780805077162
2006	An Egg is Quiet	ISBN 9781607533511
2006	Mama's Wild Child, Papa's Wild Child	ISBN 9781570915901
2004	Bless This Mouse	ISBN 9781593540500
2004	When You Were Born	ISBN 9780763614386
2003	Loony Little	ISBN 9780763616823
