= Farley Boats =

Farley's Boat Works and Storage

Farley Boats set the standard along the Gulf Coast for fishing and sport from 1915 to the mid-1970s. Three generations of the Farley family designed and built the Farley Boat in the back of their home in Port Aransas, Texas.

== Background ==
In the early 1900s, tarpon fishing had begun to attract anglers from all across America to Port Aransas, Texas. However, because of the choppy waters, access to the Gulf Coast was severely restricted. The boats of the day were not designed or built to handle the rough Gulf Coast waters and storms in the early 1900s wiped out the existing charter fleet. The local guides and fishermen were desperate for boats.

Charles Frederick ("Fred") Farley, a master craftsman, was living in Birmingham, Alabama, when he learned from his brother that the guides of Port Aransas needed boats to satisfy the great demand for tarpon fishing. Fred traveled to the Gulf Coast with his three brothers where they designed and built utility boats, lighthouses, and ornate bars. Eventually, Fred settled down in Port Aransas, with his son and began designing and building boats. They established Farley and Son, Boat Builders, in 1915.

Fred's earliest fishing boat design was an 18-footer built to meet the needs of local fishing guides. It was designed with low-sides and a high bow to fight the choppy waves. At that time, the only boats available to local anglers and guides were flat bottomed with high sides so they were not well equipped for the Gulf Coast chop. The Farley boat, on the other hand, was designed to fish the local waters and could handle the choppy water.

The earliest Farley Boats were 18 to 22 footers that carried two people. Later, the Farleys designed and built larger boats to accommodate more people and larger engines. The Farley Boats were known for a high chine that did not touch the water until well aft of the bow and a hatch in front of the windshield that opened. The Farley Boats were also designed with low cabins that allowed fishing in every direction.

Originally, Farley Boats were built with 5/8-inch-thick (16 mm) planks of top-grade cypress. They were light and very durable. After World War II, cypress became scarce and the Farley's switched to Honduran and Philippine mahogany.

The Farleys never drew up any official plans for the Farley Boats. Instead, they drew the design on the wood flooring of their shop. The Farleys marked the wood floors with a colored carpenters crayon and if prospective buyers wanted to see the boat plans, they would be shown the plywood. If the customer wanted to make a change to the boat design, the Farleys would whittle out a half-model of a boat.

Fred Farley's sons, Fred Farley Jr. and Jim Farley grew up building boats with their father and continued with the family business after Fred's death. After World War II, the boat works was moved to Mercer Street in Port Aransas, where it remained until around 1968 then moved to Avenue C. The Farley family designed and built Farley Boats until 1975.

Farley Boats were high quality boats and built to last. However, because of high frequency of hurricanes and the fact that no new models have been built in 40 years, there are very few remaining. Historians, anglers and boat builders are always on the lookout for Farley Boats.

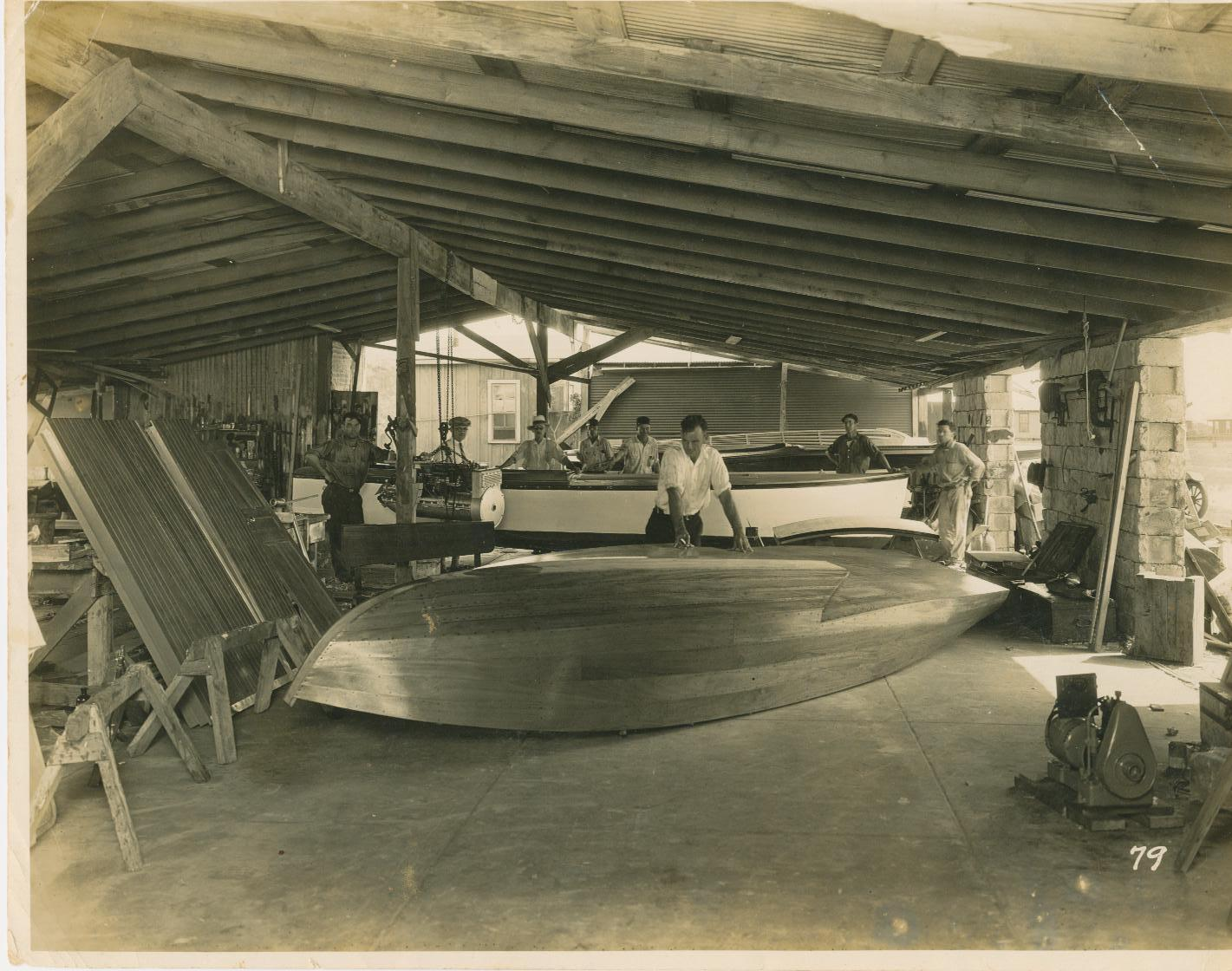
Bill Farley building a speedboat at Farley and Son, Boat Builders

Farley and Son, Boat Builders

== FDR and the Farley Boat ==
President Roosevelt catching a tarpon on a Farley Boat. Don Farley is captain of the boat. Barney Farley is holding the tarpon.

In 1936, President Franklin Delano Roosevelt visited Port Aransas, and was introduced to tarpon fishing. He enjoyed tarpon fishing so much that in 1937, while Congress was debating his Judiciary Reorganization Bill of 1937, he traveled to Port Aransas specifically to catch tarpon. He hired Barney Farley, the famous fishing guide and brother of Fred Farley.

The president brought his own 35-foot fishing boat and Barney Farley agreed to take the President out on the boat. After an unsuccessful outing, Barney Farley convinced his nephew, Don Farley, to bring the president to fish from his Farley Boat.

The current Farley Boat Company and the FDR fishing story is recounted in a 2012 episode of the syndicated television series Texas Country Reporter.
