= Dat Nguyen =

American football player and coach (born 1975)

No. 59
- Position: Linebacker

Personal information
- Born: September 25, 1975 (age 51); Fort Chaffee, Arkansas, U.S.
- Listed height: 5 ft 11 in (1.80 m)
- Listed weight: 238 lb (108 kg)

Career information
- High school: Rockport-Fulton (Rockport, Texas)
- College: Texas A&M
- NFL draft: 1999: 3rd round, 85th overall pick

Career history

Playing
- Dallas Cowboys (1999–2005)

Coaching
- Dallas Cowboys (2007–2009) Assistant linebackers/quality control coach; Texas A&M (2010–2011) Inside linebackers coach

Awards and highlights
- Second-team All-Pro (2003); All-Rookie Team (1999); Unanimous All-American (1998); Chuck Bednarik Award (1998); Lombardi Award (1998); Jack Lambert Trophy (1998); Big 12 Defensive Player of the Year (1998); 2× First-team All-Big 12 (1997, 1998); Second-team All-Big 12 (1996); Second-team All-SWC (1995); Texas A&M Athletic Hall Of Fame (2004); Big 12 10th Anniversary Team (2005); Cotton Bowl Hall of Fame (2007); AP All-Time Big 12 Team (2010); Texas Sports Hall of Fame (2014)

Career NFL statistics
- Games played: 90
- Total tackles: 515
- Sacks: 6
- Forced fumbles: 4
- Fumble recoveries: 6
- Interceptions: 7
- Stats at Pro Football Reference
- College Football Hall of Fame

Dat Tan Nguyen (/ˌdæt ˈwɪn/; Vietnamese: Nguyễn Tấn Đạt, pronounced [ŋʷjə̌ˀn tə̌n ɗàːt]; born September 25, 1975) is an American former professional football player who was a linebacker for seven seasons with the Dallas Cowboys of the National Football League (NFL). He played college football for the Texas A&M Aggies, earning unanimous All-American honors. He is the first Vietnamese-American to be drafted, play, and be recognized as an All-Pro in the NFL.

In 2017, Nguyen was elected to the College Football Hall of Fame.

== Early life ==
Nguyen's family left South Vietnam during the fall of Saigon at the end of the Vietnam War, and he was born in a refugee center at Fort Chaffee in Fort Smith, Arkansas. He lived most of his childhood in the Gulf Coast town of Rockport, Texas. At Rockport-Fulton High School, Nguyen played middle linebacker and handled punting duties. Nguyen earned All-State honors as a punter. Nguyen was recruited and received scholarship offers from Michigan, UCLA, Notre Dame, Texas, and Florida. Nguyen eventually decided to play closer to home and chose Texas A&M University.

== College career ==
Nguyen attended Texas A&M University, where he played for the Aggies from 1995 to 1998. He battled the perception that he was too small to play linebacker for as long as he was involved in the game, despite his muscular 5'11", 238-pound frame. Proving critics wrong at an early stage, he finished his college career as the Aggies' career record holder with 51 consecutive starts, 517 career tackles, and a 10.7 tackles-per-game average. His 517 career tackles are a Texas A&M record. He is the only Aggie to ever lead the school in tackles for four consecutive years. It is widely acknowledged that Nguyen was the undisputed on-field leader of the famous "Wrecking Crew" defense, as well as being its most famous and decorated player.

In 1995, he was named Southwest Conference Defensive Newcomer of the Year. From 1996 to 1998, he earned first-team All-Big 12 honors three consecutive times. In 1997, he was named Aggies MVP. In 1998, he was named a unanimous All-American by every awarding publication, won the Bednarik Award for College Defensive Player of the Year, and the Lombardi Award for Outstanding College Lineman. Nguyen was also selected as a finalist for the Butkus Award, eventually becoming first runner-up. Nguyen missed winning the Butkus Award by a single vote out of more than 45 votes cast. It remains to date the closest vote in Butkus Award history. He was named Defensive Player of the Game for the 1998 Cotton Bowl after recording a bowl-record 12 tackles, including three tackles for a loss, and an interception, which he lateraled to a teammate for a touchdown. The Dallas Morning News named him Big 12 Male Athlete of the Year in 1998, and he earned Defensive Player of the Year honors in the Big 12 Conference. He also won the Jack Lambert Award in 1998. That same year, Texas A&M won the Big 12 championship game against Kansas State which is to date their last conference title. In 2005, he was named to the Big 12 Conference's 10th Anniversary Team. In 2010, he was voted on to the AP All-Time Big 12 Team tying with former University of Texas player Derrick Johnson for most votes at linebacker (19 out of 20.) Nguyen is generally acknowledged as the best defensive player in Texas A&M football history and one of the greatest defensive players of all time in the history of the Big 12 Conference. In 2004, Nguyen was inducted in the Texas A&M Athletics Hall Of Fame. In April 2007, Nguyen was also inducted into the Texas Sports Hall of Fame and the AT&T Cotton Bowl Hall Of Fame.

On January 9, 2017, the National Football Foundation announced Nguyen was elected to the College Football Hall of Fame, an impressive class that included Peyton Manning, Adrian N. Peterson, Marshall Faulk, Steve Spurrier, and Brian Urlacher.

== Professional career ==
=== Dallas Cowboys ===
The Dallas Cowboys drafted Nguyen in the third round (85th overall) of the 1999 NFL draft.

Nguyen made an impact with the Cowboys from the beginning, leading the team in special teams tackles (18) as a rookie and becoming the Cowboys' starting middle linebacker in his second season, after Randall Godfrey left via free agency.

In 2000, he played 10 games (five starts) and registered 64 tackles, after missing six contests with a sprained knee and losing his starting job to Barron Wortham. The next year, he completed his first full season as a starter and finished with a team-leading 172 tackles.

In 2002, while playing against the Houston Texans in the season opener, he suffered a broken wrist that forced him to miss the next eight games. Despite the serious injury, he finished the Texans game with a team-high 11 tackles (one for a loss) and one sack.

When head coach Bill Parcells arrived in 2003, he was critical of the linebackers in the Cowboys roster, joking publicly: "If this were the circus, we could fit them all into one of those Volkswagens that 10 clowns climb out of." The next season, he would pay Nguyen a compliment when he said: "He's a football playing dude, that guy. ... You bet he could have played for any of my teams".

In 2003, with Nguyen leading the team in tackles, the Cowboys were the second-most effective defense in the NFL and he was selected second-team All-Pro by the Associated Press. In 2004, Parcells implemented his preferred 3–4 defense and Nguyen repeated as the team's leading tackler, but the additional hits he received in this scheme started to affect his health.

In 2005, he started the first four games before suffering a neck injury that sidelined him for three games. He returned as a nickel linebacker and played in four more games, before being placed on the injured reserve list on November 28, after the Thanksgiving Day overtime loss against the Denver Broncos. He finished the season with 31 tackles and one sack in eight appearances.

Nguyen officially retired from the NFL on March 3, 2006, after a neck injury and knee problems, which hindered his performance, failed to improve. He led the team in tackles three times, in 2001, 2003, and 2004, and amassed 516 tackles in seven seasons, despite missing half of two separate seasons to injury. As of November 2010, Dat Nguyen currently ranks 10th all-time in Cowboys recorded history for career total tackles. For his NFL career, he was named to the 2013 class of Texas Gridiron Legends.

== Coaching career ==
=== Dallas Cowboys ===
In February 2007, Cowboys head coach Wade Phillips announced the hiring of Nguyen as assistant linebackers coach and defensive quality control coach. Along with Phillips' son Wes, Nguyen was the first assistant hired under Phillips. Nguyen left the Cowboys on January 27, 2010.

=== Texas A&M ===
Nguyen was named the inside linebackers coach at Texas A&M University on February 12, 2010. In Nguyen's first year as the A&M inside linebackers coach, the Aggies went 9–3 in the regular season with wins over nationally ranked Oklahoma and Nebraska, and over Texas and Texas Tech. This marked the first time in school history that A&M beat those four teams in a season. The resurgence of the Texas A&M defense to its former glory as the "Wrecking Crew" and particularly the outstanding play of the linebacker corps was cited as a major reason for the team's 2010 season success.

Nguyen helped cement linebacker Von Miller's status in Texas A&M history by coaching him in the 2010 season, which led to Miller being awarded the 2010 Butkus Award.

At the conclusion of the 2011 season, Nguyen chose to leave Texas A&M, telling the Houston Chronicle's Brent Zwerneman there was "no chance" of him being retained on Kevin Sumlin's staff.

== NFL career statistics ==
=== Regular season ===
Year	Team	Games		Tackles					Interceptions					Fumbles			
Year	Team	GP	GS	Cmb	Solo	Ast	Sck	Sfty	Int	Yds	Lng	TD	PD	FF	FR	Yds	TD
1999	DAL	16	0	43	36	7	1.0	0	1	6	6	0	1	0	0	0	0
2000	DAL	10	5	48	42	6	0.0	0	2	31	24	0	4	0	1	0	0
2001	DAL	16	16	113	91	22	0.0	0	0	0	0	0	2	1	0	0	0
2002	DAL	8	8	52	42	10	1.0	0	0	0	0	0	1	0	0	0	0
2003	DAL	16	16	121	90	31	2.0	0	0	0	0	0	11	2	2	0	0
2004	DAL	16	16	107	75	32	1.0	0	3	19	19	0	5	1	1	9	0
2005	DAL	8	4	31	26	5	1.0	0	1	7	7	0	3	0	2	0	0
Career		90	65	515	402	113	6.0	0	7	63	24	0	27	4	6	9	0

== Personal life ==
Nguyen married his college sweetheart, Becky, and they have three daughters and twin boys. His family are Roman Catholic and attend mass at St. Peter the Apostle Catholic Church in Boerne, Texas. In May 2004, Nguyen was awarded a Golden Torch Award at the Vietnamese American National Gala in Washington, D.C. He was also featured in HBO's Hard Knocks. In 2012, he became cohost with Jasson Minnix of an afternoon sports talk program on ESPN in San Antonio. In March 2016, Nguyen became an owner/operator of a Chick-fil-A franchise located at Montgomery Plaza in Fort Worth, Texas.
