= Hoopes–Smith House =

Historic house in Texas, United States

- U.S. National Register of Historic Places
- Recorded Texas Historic Landmark
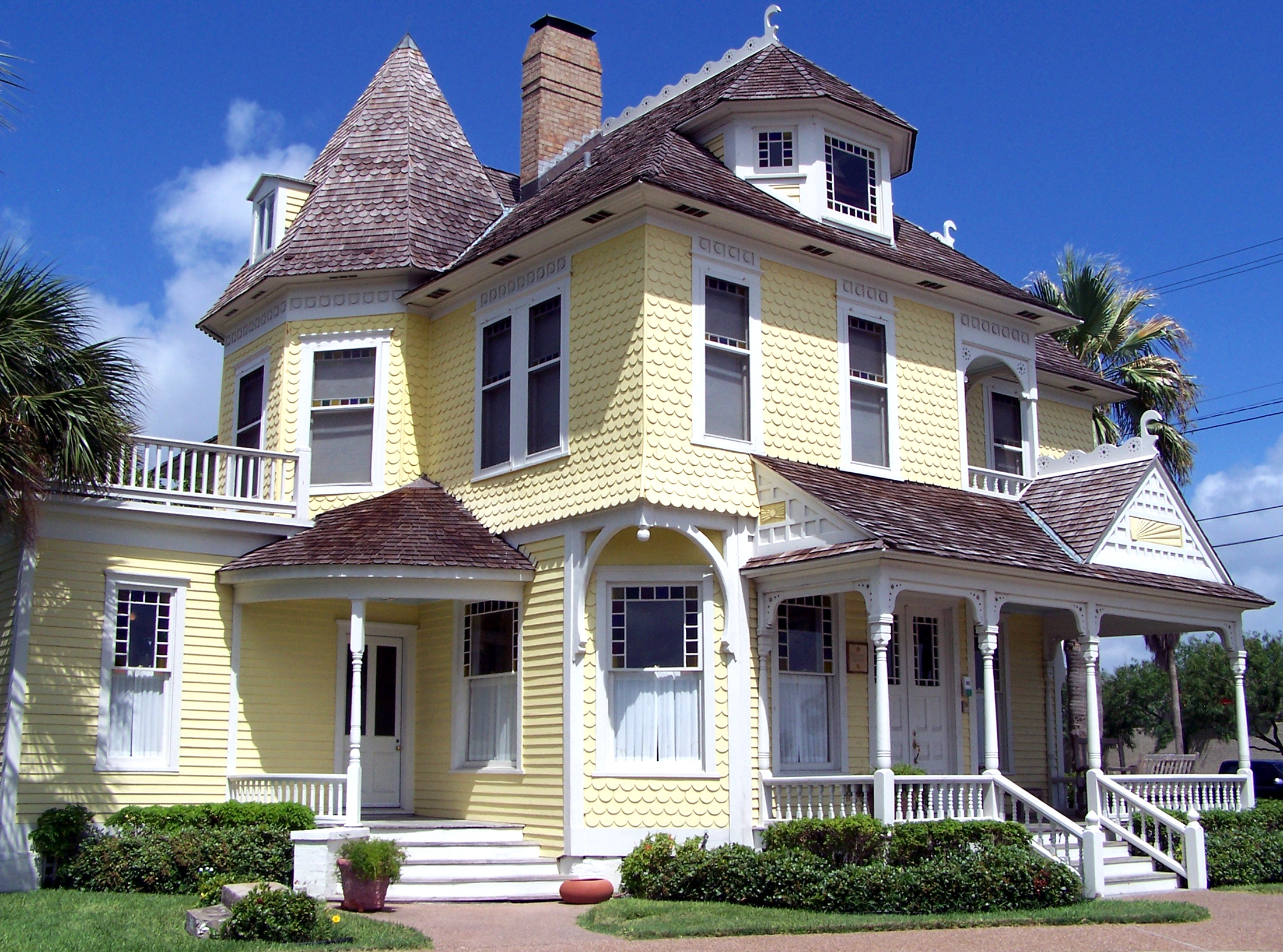
- The Hoopes–Smith house features milled woodwork, a turret and stained glass windows.

- Location within Texas Location within the United States
- Location: 417 N. Broadway, Rockport, Texas
- Coordinates: 28°1′37″N 97°2′59″W
- Area: less than one acre
- Built: 1890
- Architect: D. S. Hopkins
- Architectural style: Queen Anne
- NRHP reference No.: 94001016
- RTHL No.: 2557

Significant dates
- Added to NRHP: August 19, 1994
- Designated RTHL: 1989

The Hoopes–Smith House is a late Victorian period, Queen Anne Style home built between 1890 and 1892 in Rockport, Texas by James M. Hoopes (1839–1931), a prominent local businessman and land developer.

The home later served as a boarding house between 1894 and 1930. In 1934, the house was sold to T. Noah Smith Sr. (1888–1955) another prominent businessman with dealings in oil and shipbuilding.

The house was designated a Texas Historic Landmark in 1989 and added to the National Register of Historic Places in 1994. The house is located at 28.0271° -97.0497°, 417 N. Broadway, Rockport, Texas, United States and is currently used as a bed and breakfast.

== See also ==
- National Register of Historic Places listings in Aransas County, Texas
- Recorded Texas Historic Landmarks in Aransas County
