= Aransas County Airport =

Airport in Texas, United States

- IATA: RKP; ICAO: KRKP; FAA LID: RKP

Summary
- Airport type: Public
- Owner: Aransas County
- Serves: Rockport, Texas
- Elevation AMSL: 24 ft (7.3 m)
- Coordinates: 28°05′10″N 097°02′37″W

Map
- Location within Texas

Runways
Direction	Length		Surface
Direction	ft	m	Surface
14/32	5,608	1,709	Asphalt
18/36	4,498	1,371	Asphalt

Statistics (2008)
- Aircraft operations: 82,220
- Based aircraft: 66
- Source: Federal Aviation Administration

Aransas County Airport (IATA: RKP, ICAO: KRKP, FAA LID: RKP) is in Aransas County five miles (7 km) north of Rockport, Texas. The FAA's National Plan of Integrated Airport Systems for 2009–2013 categorized it as a general aviation facility.

== Facilities ==
The airport covers 600 acres (240 ha) at an elevation of 24 feet (7 m). It has two asphalt runways: 14/32 is 5,608 by 100 feet (1,709 x 30 m) and 18/36 is 4,498 by 100 feet (1,371 x 30 m).

In the year ending August 1, 2008 the airport had 82,220 aircraft operations, average 225 per day: 60% general aviation, 40% military, and <1% air taxi. 66 aircraft were then based at this airport: 65% single-engine, 17% multi-engine and 18% helicopter.

== See also ==
- List of airports in Texas
