= Rockport-Fulton High School =

Public school in Texas, United States

Location
- 1801 Omohundro Street; Rockport, Aransas County, Texas 78382-3217; United States; 28.04277°N 97.04492°W

Information
- School type: Public, high school
- Motto: Once a Pirate, Always a Pirate
- Established: 1884
- Locale: Town: Distant
- School district: Rockport-Fulton ISD
- NCES School ID: 480855000222
- Principal: Rhonda Mieth
- Faculty: 69.07 (on an FTE basis)
- Grades: 9–12
- Enrollment: 898 (2023–2024)
- Student to teacher ratio: 13.00
- Colors: Forest green and gold
- Athletics conference: UIL Class AAAA
- Mascot: Pirates/Lady Pirates
- Rival: Sinton High School
- Website: rfhs.rfisd.us

Rockport-Fulton High School is a public high school in Rockport, Texas, United States, located on the Texas Gulf Coast. It is the only high school in the Rockport-Fulton Independent School District and classified as a 4A school by the UIL. During 2023–2024, Rockport-Fulton High School had an enrollment of 898 students and a student to teacher ratio of 13.00. The school received an overall rating of "C" from the Texas Education Agency for the 2024–2025 school year.

Parts of the school collapsed in August 2017 due to Hurricane Harvey. Its new gymnasium, built for $1 million donated by Ellen DeGeneres and Lowe's Home Improvement, has a capacity of 1,000 and opened in the fall of September 2019.

== Athletics ==
The Rockport-Fulton Pirates compete in the following sports

- Cross Country
- Band
- Volleyball
- Football
- Basketball
- Powerlifting
- Soccer
- Golf
- Tennis
- Track
- Softball
- Baseball

== Notable alumni ==
- Dat Nguyen – former NFL player for the Dallas Cowboys
- Guy Clark - American country and folk singer, musician, songwriter, recording artist, and performer
- Tammie Brown - drag queen, best known for appearing on the first seasons of RuPaul’s Drag Race and RuPaul's Drag Race All Stars
