= Steven A. Hickham Jr. =

American racing driver

Steven Hickham
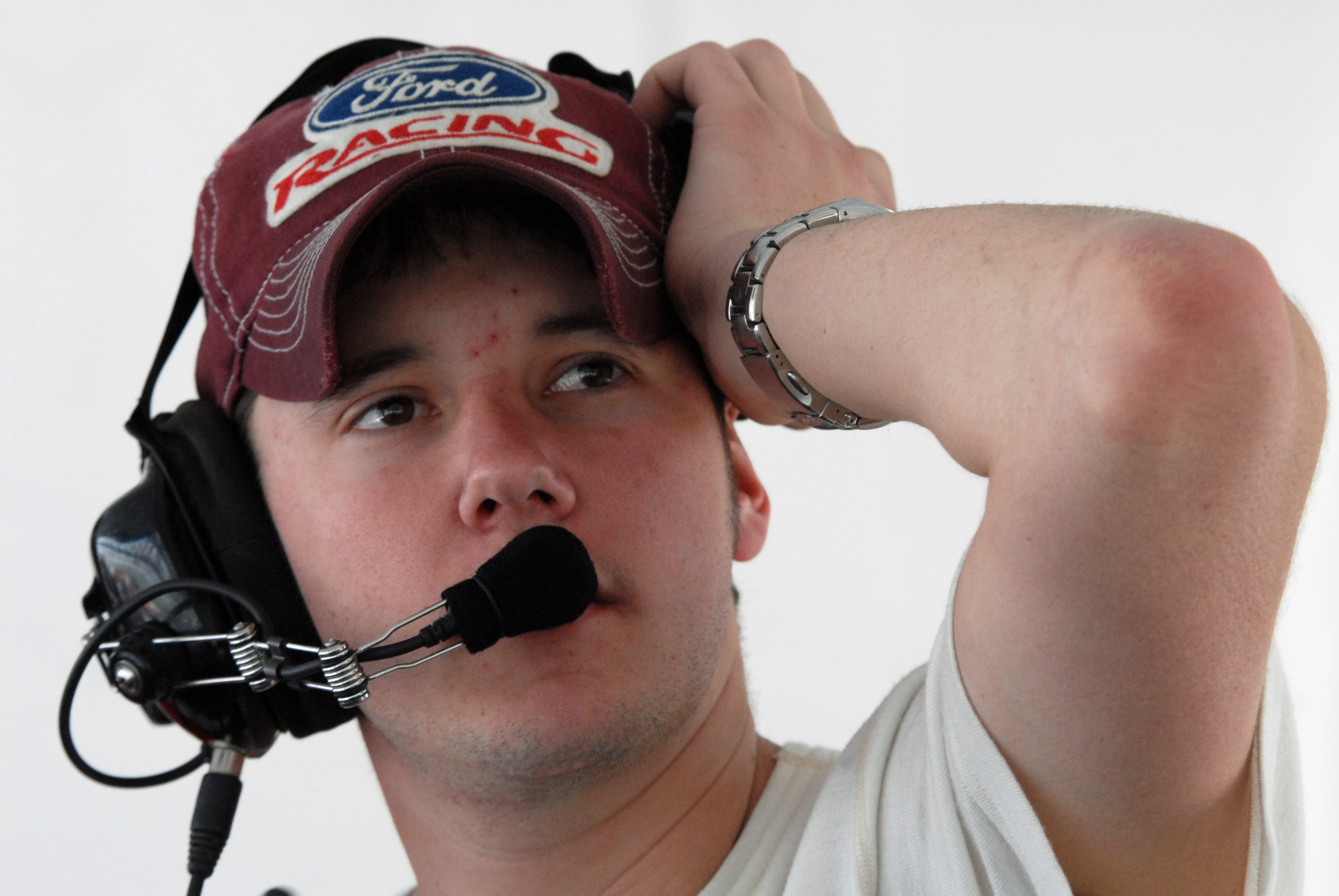
- Hickham
- Full name: Steven A. Hickham Jr.
- Born: September 21, 1989 Corpus Christi, Texas

Steven Arthur Hickham Jr. (born Corpus Christi, Texas September 21, 1989) is an American racing driver.

== Early years ==
Hickham grew up on a ranch just outside Corpus Christi, Texas. He won 3rd place in bull riding at The Houston Livestock Show & Rodeo in 2005. At the start of his sophomore year in high school, Hickham moved to Port Aransas, Texas, to focus more on his career in racing.

== Career ==
On March 17, 2006, at the first round of the Star Pro Formula Mazda race in Sebring, Florida, Hickham had his first race start as a professional race driver. He finished 12th, having run in the top five for part of the race. He placed 18th in the Labor Day Grand Prix of Motorsport on September 2, 2006. Hickham ultimately finished 25th in points, with a best finish of 10th at Road America in his first season. He won the Championship in the 2006 SWFM Pro Car Series.

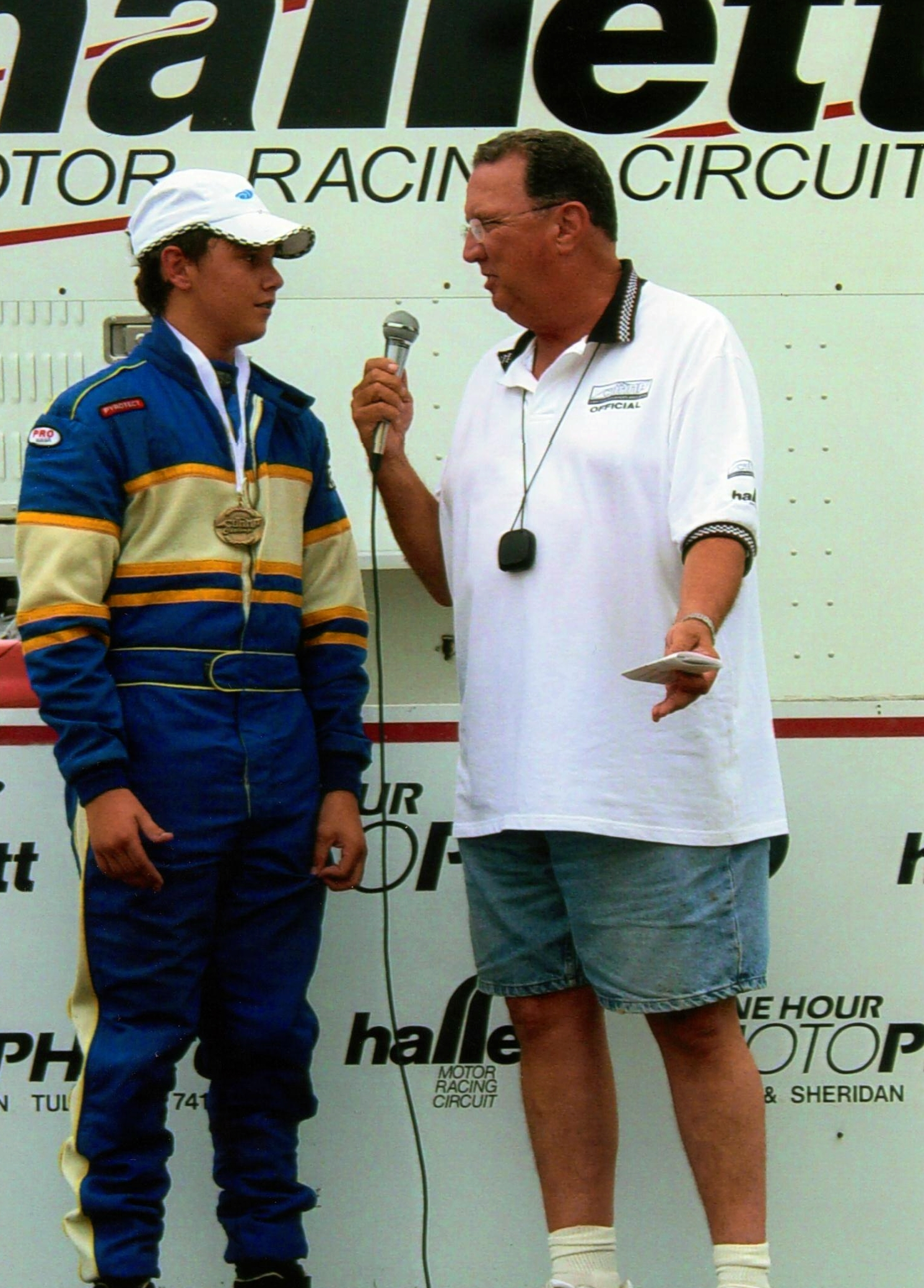
Steven Hickham Jr. being interviewed after his race

Hickham made a showing at the 2007 SCCA Runoffs, only to suffer from mishaps in turn one of the first lap. The following weekend, he was back in the pro Mazda at Laguna Seca Raceway, finishing 8th behind his teammate Marco DiLeo. Hickham then made a move from open wheel racing to full body cars.

In the 2008 SCC Grand Am / Grand Sport series, Hickham's final position was 115th.

Hickham and his co-driver, his father Steve Hickham Sr., continued to compete with each other as a father/son race team until 2010. He would take a 3 year hiatus while attending fire fighting school, and EMT school at Coral Springs Fire Academy in Coral Springs, Florida. In 2013 he would return to open wheel racing with K-Hill Motorsports for the Sportscar Vintage Racing Association (SVRA) invitational at Circuit Of The Americas (COTA) in Austin, Texas to drive the Hapag-Lloyd Lola 97-20 Indy lights car. He was able to score a 2nd place in class and a 3rd place overall behind his close family friend Gaston Kearby and ahead of his father Steve. Over the next 4 years Hickham would make appearances on track, but just for hire, coaching, or for fun.

In 2020, Hickham started racing off-road racing with a Can-Am side by side in the Outlaw Off-Road Racing Series at Tex-Plex motorsports park in Midlothian, Texas.

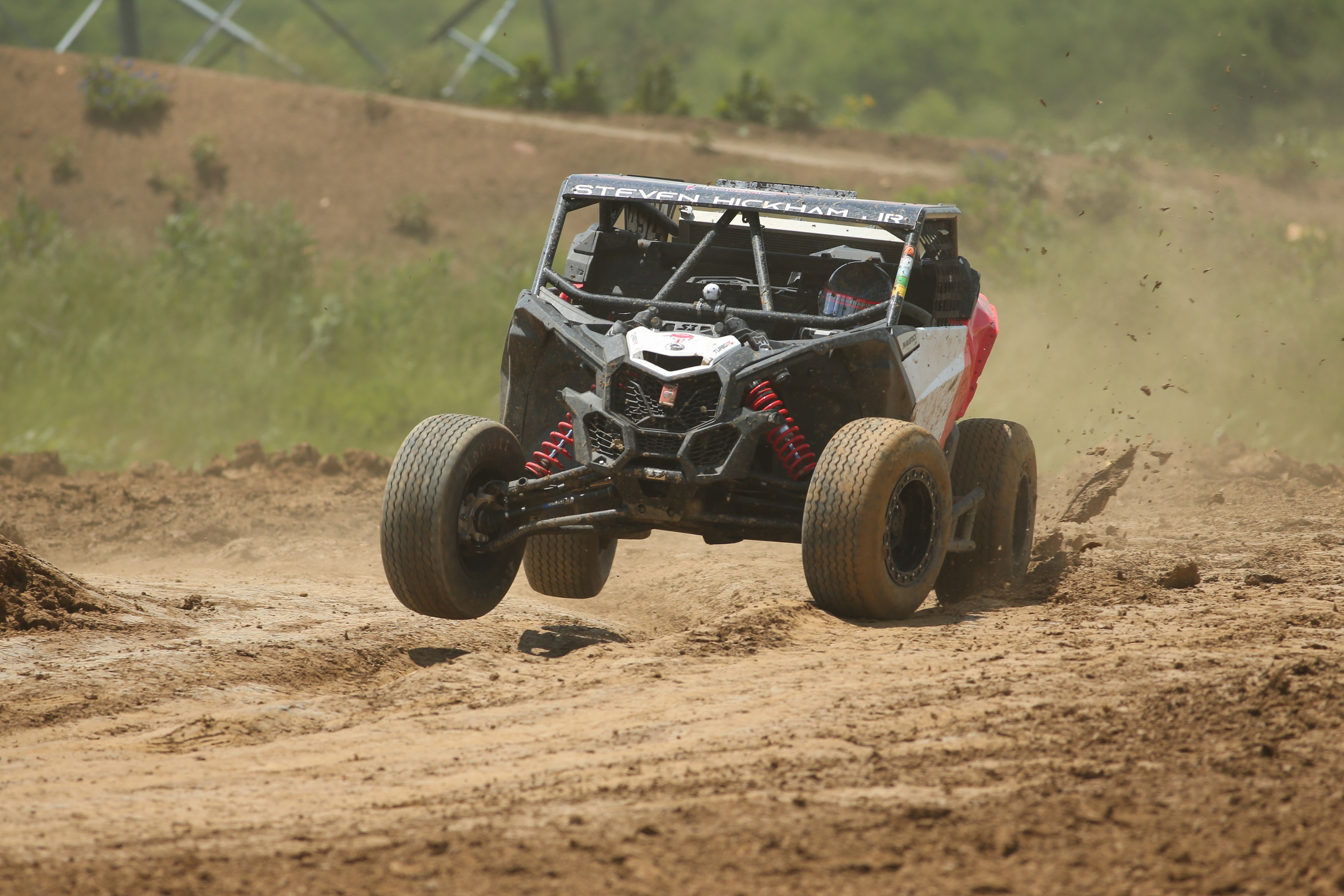
Steven Hickham Jr racing his Can-Am in Midlothian, Texas

Hickham was able to capture his heat win on June 18, 2021 (driving for sponsors: Design lab / Turbomachinery / cbdMD / Ballyhoo Plastics / S3 Powersports / 5D Evolution / Rocks Discount Vitamins and More / Dirt Monkey / PAGID brake pads / Paragon Products) as stated on his Facebook only to suffer from a part failure during the feature race. Hickham still continues to race in the Outlaw Off-Road Racing Series.

=== iRacing ===
In 2024, Steven started on a new endeavor, the world of VR-racing. Joining the Velocity Pro Sims / Sim Rental Pros esports racing team / A Sim Racing for Mental Health team alongside team owner Jose Cabrera and teammate Victor Aponte. On March 23, 2024 they shared their first race together. It was also the very same track that Hickham got his professional start at, Sebring International Raceway, for the iRacing 12 hours of Sebring. The race had several mishaps, but they were able to secure a top-20 finish. The team was able to secure a tenth place finish at the iRacing 6hrs of The Glen driving a Dallara LMP2, for their best finish of 2024. Hickham said in a Facebook post that the 2025 season looks probmising, and there will be great things that come of it."

==== 2025 ====
In 2025, Hickham expanded his sim-racing activities with the Velocity Pro Sims team, joining teammates Dylan Slonetsky, Edwin Litolff, and Jose Cabrera, with engineer Anthony Aznar and crew chief Dougy Trupsky. The team targeted premier endurance events on the iRacing platform, including the 6 Hours of Indy and the 10-hour virtual edition of the Petit Le Mans at Road Atlanta.

At the iRacing 6 Hours of Indy, Hickham and the team delivered a strong effort — finishing 6th overall in the Cadillac GTP-Hybrid category — reflecting a marked improvement in pace, strategy and consistency.

Their momentum carried into the iRacing Petit Le Mans, where after a 10-hour contest the squad achieved their first podium finish in a major sim-endurance event, placing second overall. The result aligned with broader attention to the event, which featured increasingly competitive fields and media coverage.

Hickham’s 2025 campaign demonstrated how his real-world racing background and endurance discipline translated into the virtual arena. The progress made by Velocity Pro Sims during the season contributed to the team's rising profile within the iRacing endurance community and helped broaden his motorsport-portfolio beyond the physical cockpit.

== Other life ==
The Hickham family has been in the petrol chemical repair business since his grand father, I.W. "Will" Hickham, founder of Ashley - Hickham, Uhr Company, and later Hickham Industries. Will established one of the first non OEM repair facilities in the United States. In 1979, Steven's father, Steve Hickham Sr., founded Turbomachinery Industries. Steven would grow up in and around the petrol chemical repair industry for most of his life. In 2023 he started working at his uncle's repair facility, Compressor and Turbine Services (CTS) in Houston, Texas continuing on his families legacy.
