= Rockport-Fulton Independent School District =

School district in Texas, United States

Location
- 619 N Live Oak St. Rockport, Texas ESC Region 2 USA
- Coordinates: 28°1′43″N 97°3′11″W

District information
- Type: Public Independent school district
- Motto: "Start Here. Go Anywhere!"
- Grades: EE through 12
- Superintendent: Dr. Leslie Austin
- Schools: 4 (2023-2024)
- NCES District ID: 4808550

Students and staff
- Students: 3165 (2012-13)
- Teachers: 232.44 (2011-12) (on full-time equivalent (FTE) basis)
- Student–teacher ratio: 13.48 (2011-12)
- Athletic conference: UIL Class 3A Football & Basketball
- District mascot: Pirates
- Colors: Green, Gold

Other information
- TEA District Accountability Rating for 2011-12: Recognized
- Website: www.rfisd.us

Rockport-Fulton Independent School District, formerly Aransas County Independent School District, is an independent county-wide school district based in Rockport, Texas, United States. The district serves a 486-square-mile (1,260 km^{2}) area that covers most of Aransas County, including the city of Rockport, the town of Fulton, and the unincorporated communities of Holiday Beach and Lamar.

== History ==
The first public school in Aransas County was instituted in 1884 where the Rockport city water tower once stood. In 1886 a one-room school house was built in Fulton. A one-room school at Sparks Colony followed. The school met in various places and land was sought for the location of a permanent building to house the school. The land was purchased and the building completed in 1892. It was constructed at the site of present-day Rockport Elementary. On May 17, 1907, four girls and two boys graduated from the Rockport High School in a ceremony held at the Bailey Pavilion, built over the water across from where the Wells Fargo Bank now stands. It was the first graduating class in the history of the school.

Between 1893 and 1949, seven Common School Districts were in existence in the county. In June 1949, these districts voted to consolidate and became the Aransas County Independent School District.

In 1935 Rockport School was erected, now known as Rockport Elementary. In 1953, a new high school was opened at its present location on a site between Fulton and Rockport. In 1957 Fulton Elementary School opened; and in 1988 an additional building on the south side of the existing campus was completed. In September 1963, classes were opened in the new Junior High; and in September, 1967, the Live Oak Elementary School was opened. The most recent construction was Rockport-Fulton Middle School and renovations to Rockport-Fulton High School connecting the high school to the old Jr. High, creating a larger campus to service the High School students of Aransas County.

Damage from Hurricane Harvey led to school activities being suspended indefinitely, with the nearby Gregory-Portland ISD temporarily adding ACISD students to its enrollment while ACISD's facilities underwent extensive repairs. The school district would resume classes on October 11, 2017, with the exception of Little Bay Primary. Its repairs were not yet completed, and as such its Pre-K and Kindergarten students attended Live Oak Learning Center, the district's school for first and second graders.

Little Bay Primary would eventually be closed permanently and its land sold to the Rockport Land Trust in 2019. Later, Aransas County would buy the land using a $1.7 million grant from the U.S. Economic Development Administration as part of a partnership with Del Mar College to transform the site into the Aransas County Workforce Development Center in January 2021.

Looking to improve the school district's recognizability, the district's board of trustees voted unanimously to change the district's name to Rockport-Fulton Independent School District on June 21, 2023 in order to reflect the more well known Rockport-Fulton High School. This change was shortly thereafter approved by the Texas Education Agency. The new name went into effect at the start of the 2023-2024 school year.

== Finances ==
As of the 2010-2011 school year, the appraised valuation of property in the district was $2,456,442,000. The maintenance tax rate was $0.104 and the bond tax rate was $0.005 per $100 of appraised valuation.

In 2025, voters in the Rockport-Fulton Independent School District rejected Proposition A in a voter-approval tax rate election with tallies showing 67.27% voting against the measure. The proposition sough voter approval to adopt a tax rate of $1.1793 per $100 of assessed property value.

== Academic achievement ==
In 2011, the school district was rated "recognized" by the Texas Education Agency. Thirty-five percent of districts in Texas in 2011 received the same rating. No state accountability ratings will be given to districts in 2012. A school district in Texas can receive one of four possible rankings from the Texas Education Agency: Exemplary (the highest possible ranking), Recognized, Academically Acceptable, and Academically Unacceptable (the lowest possible ranking).

Historical district TEA accountability ratings

- 2011: Recognized
- 2010: Recognized
- 2009: Recognized
- 2008: Recognized
- 2007: Academically Acceptable
- 2006: Academically Acceptable
- 2005: Academically Acceptable
- 2004: Recognized

== Schools ==
In the 2023-2024 school year, the district had students in four schools.

- Rockport-Fulton High School (Grades 9-12)
- Rockport-Fulton Middle School (Grades 6-8)
- Fulton Learning Center (Grades 3-5)
- Live Oak Learning Center (Grades EE-2)

== See also ==
- List of school districts in Texas
- List of high schools in Texas
