= T. H. Mathis House =

- U.S. National Register of Historic Places
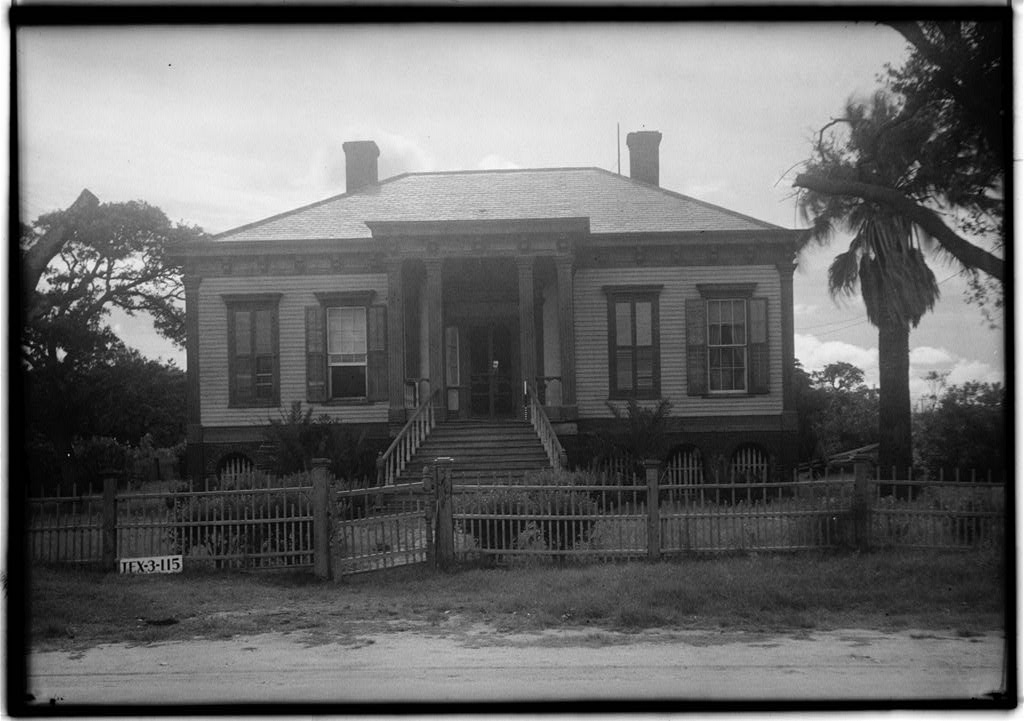

- Location within Texas
- Location: 612 Church Street, Rockport, Texas
- Coordinates: 28°01′12″N 97°03′18″W
- Area: 1.5 acres (0.61 ha)
- Built: 1867
- Architectural style: Greek Revival
- NRHP reference No.: 71000918
- Added to NRHP: June 21, 1971

The T. H. Mathis House, at 612 Church Street in Rockport, Texas, is a historic Greek Revival-style house built in 1867. It was listed on the National Register of Historic Places in 1971.

It is a Recorded Texas Historic Landmark. The residence was long owned by the same family.

It is a one-story five-bay framed cottage on a raised basement, and is a "very refined" late example of Greek Revival style. Its piano nobile (raised main floor) is approached "by a flaired [sic] staircase which intensifies the dramatic effect of the raised entrance. The entrance portico is supported by two pairs of square fluted wooden columns on a plinth base with finely molded capitals. The pilasters at the juncture of the portico and the main block of the house repeat the design of the columns, as do the corner pilasters on the east or main facade." Its entry doorway has sidelights and a transom.

The house was documented by the Historic American Buildings Survey.
