= The Moon over Star =

Book by Dianna Hutts Aston

- First edition
- Author: Dianna Hutts Aston
- Illustrator: Jerry Pinkney
- Language: English
- Genre: Children's literature, picture book
- Published: 2008 (Dial Books for Young Readers)
- Publication place: USA
- Media type: Print (hardback, paperback)
- Pages: 32 (unpaginated)
- ISBN: 9780803731073
- OCLC: 191897904

The Moon over Star is a 2008 picture book by Dianna Hutts Aston and illustrated by Jerry Pinkney. It is about a girl, Mae (a nod to African American astronaut Mae Jemison), who, with her family, follows the 1969 Apollo 11 Moon landing.

== Reception ==
School Library Journal, in a review of The Moon Over Star, wrote "Pinkney's remarkable graphite, ink, and watercolor paintings evoke both the vastness of space and the intimacy of 1960s family life. Writing in the voice of a nine-year-old African-American girl, Aston is lyrical and sometimes evocative, though some of her narrative choices are overworked." and ".. this book offers children a close-up view of an experience that seems quaint today, but that was life-changing in 1969." and Booklist called it "A quiet, satisfying tribute to this milestone in human history and its power to inspire others."

The Horn Book Magazine wrote "Aston provides a tender, lyrical evocation of a relationship, skillfully weaving in details that convey the historic weight of the event. Likewise, Pinkney combines his signature cozy watercolor scenes of family with spreads capturing the drama of a rocket blasting off and the beauty of the earth and moon highlighted against the dark expanse of space."

The Moon over Star has also been reviewed by Publishers Weekly Kirkus Reviews, Ebony, and Library Media Connection.

It was awarded a 2009 Coretta Scott King Award illustrator honor and was a 2010-2011 West Virginia Children's Choice Book Award nominee.
