= Rockport, Texas =

- City
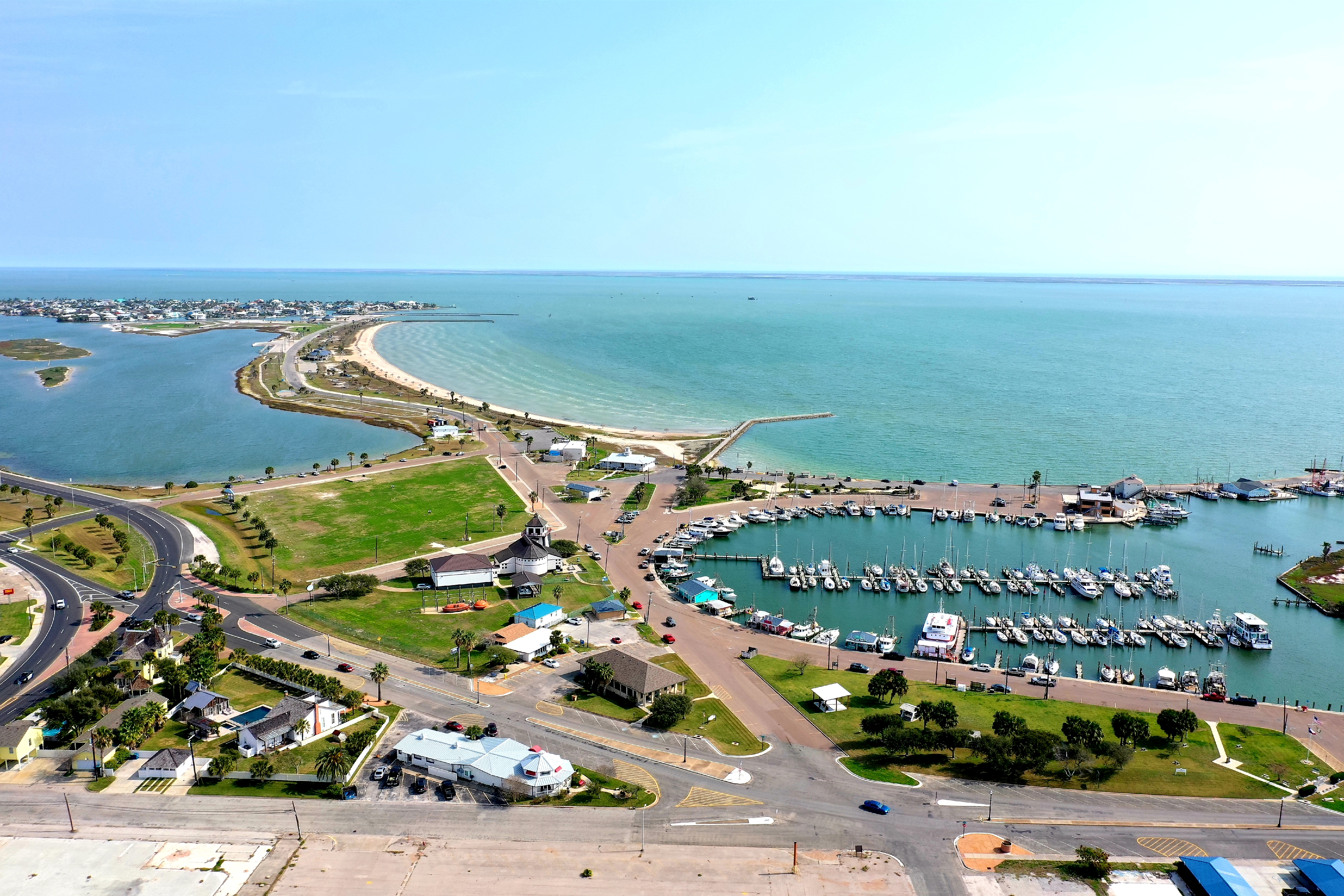
- Nickname: The Texas Riviera
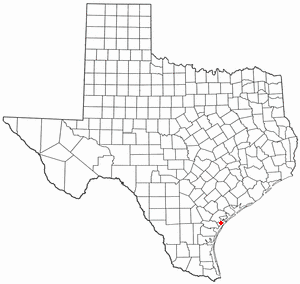
- Location of Rockport, Texas

- Coordinates: 28°2′55″N 97°2′28″W
- Country: United States
- State: Texas
- County: Aransas
- Incorporated: August 18, 1870

Government
  - Mayor: Lowell Timothy Jayroe

Area
  - Total: 21.09 sq mi (54.63 km^{2})
  - Land: 16.54 sq mi (42.85 km^{2})
  - Water: 4.55 sq mi (11.78 km^{2})
- Elevation: 6.6 ft (2 m)

Population (2020)
  - Total: 10,070
  - Estimate (2021): 10,436
  - Density: 608.7/sq mi (235.0/km^{2})
- Time zone: UTC-6 (Central (CST))
  - Summer (DST): UTC-5 (CDT)
- ZIP codes: 78381-78382
- Area code: 361
- FIPS code: 48-62804
- GNIS feature ID: 1345420
- Website: www.rockporttx.gov

Rockport is a city and county seat of Aransas County, Texas, United States. The population was 10,070 at the 2020 census.

Rockport is adjacent to the town of Fulton, and many refer to the combined communities as "Rockport-Fulton"; however, Rockport and Fulton are legally separate municipalities.

== History ==
=== 19th Century ===
Following the Civil War, a number of people considered developing the Live Oak Peninsula. Joseph F. Smith, who had founded the nearby town of St. Mary's in 1850, joined with Thomas H. Mathis and his cousin J.M. Mathis, who were agents of the Morgan Steamship line, and built a wharf at the site of what would later become the town of Rockport, in 1867. The same year, George W. Fulton and his wife, Texas heiress, and Joseph Smith's cousin, Harriet Smith Fulton moved to her extensive land holdings on the peninsula. Fulton also took an interest in the development of Rockport, as well as creating the town of Fulton farther up the coastline. In response, a nascent cattle-slaughtering and packing operation at the wharf expanded rapidly, allowing Rockport to be officially incorporated as a town in 1870; its name arising from the rock ledge that runs along the shore. Thomas Mathis became Rockport's first mayor after being appointed by the governor. A year later in 1871, the town achieved "city" status after continued growth.

In 1871, the Mathis cousins teamed up with local ranching families of George W. Fulton and Thomas M. Coleman to raise and slaughter cattle for shipment out of the city's wharf on their steamship line. The partnership proved highly successful and continued to draw people and businesses to the city. The national Panic of 1873 took its share of the town's prosperity and caused a slump for the next few years. The meatpacking market was slow to recover, and the Mathis cousins abandoned the ranching partnership in 1879. Fulton and Coleman then re-formed their ranching partnership, an organization that continued into the 1930s. For many years Fulton and others petitioned for the railroad to extend their lines to Rockport to provide a second source of transportation and break the Morgan Line's monopoly on the Coastal Bend ports. After offering free rights of way across the Coleman-Fulton ranch, and hundreds of acres in town lots, finally, in 1888 the railroad arrived. The Morgan Steamship company now had competition, and as the local cattle ranchers began shipping live cattle by train, The Morgan Line withdrew from serving the Coastal Bend. Another brief growth spurt began and soon ended, here and across Texas, due to some bad winters and the development of the cattle industry in the mid-west. The railroad, however, brought tourists, and the city's economy grew with several large hotels catering to that industry. Rockport's economy soon came to be dominated by shipbuilding and tourism toward the end of the 19th century. At the same time, the railroad offered speedy transportation for crops, and a land boom caused by farming followed until brought to a halt with the national Panic of 1893.

=== 20th Century ===
Rockport's economy continued struggling into the early 20th century and took another hit in 1919 when a major hurricane decimated the region. A slow recovery ensued stalling additional development. The city's fortunes however began to improve in 1925 following the establishment of a lucrative shrimping industry which grew further during the 1930s and benefited from the construction of a harbor in 1935. Shrimping activity decreased during World War II but recovered thereafter, boosting the town along with an important boat-building industry that developed in this period as well. By the century's end, shrimping continued to be an important part of the Rockport economy alongside fishing and tourism.

=== 21st Century ===
On August 25, 2017, Hurricane Harvey (name now retired) made landfall near the city as a Category 4 storm on the Saffir–Simpson scale. Harvey caused one death and catastrophic damage. One person died in a house fire in the city, unable to be rescued due to the extreme weather conditions, entire blocks were destroyed by the hurricane's violent eyewall winds, the city's courthouse was severely damaged when a cargo trailer was hurled into it, coming to a stop halfway through the structure, the gymnasium of the Rockport-Fulton High School lost multiple walls while the school itself suffered considerable damage, many homes, apartment buildings, and businesses sustained major structural damage from the intense winds, and several were completely destroyed. Numerous boats were damaged or sunk at a marina in town, airplanes and structures were destroyed at the Aransas County Airport, and the Fairfield Inn was severely damaged as well, About 20 percent of Rockport's population was displaced, as they were still unable to return to their homes a year after the hurricane.

== Geography ==
Rockport is located on the Live Oak Peninsula, which divides the western shore of Aransas Bay, an arm of the Gulf of Mexico, and the eastern shore of Copano Bay. According to the United States Census Bureau, the city has a total area of 18.5 square miles (47.9 km^{2}), of which 13.9 square miles (36.1 km^{2}) is land and 4.6 square miles (11.8 km^{2}), or 28.84%, is water.

=== Climate ===
The climate in this area is characterized by hot, humid summers and generally mild-to-cool winters. According to the Köppen Climate Classification system, Rockport has a humid subtropical climate, abbreviated "Cfa" on climate maps.

Climate data for Rockport, Texas (1981–2010 normals, extremes 1959–2013, 2023–present)
Month	Jan	Feb	Mar	Apr	May	Jun	Jul	Aug	Sep	Oct	Nov	Dec	Year
Record high °F (°C)	87 (31)	90 (32)	99 (37)	100 (38)	98 (37)	102 (39)	100 (38)	102 (39)	105 (41)	97 (36)	96 (36)	87 (31)	105 (41)
Mean daily maximum °F (°C)	65.2 (18.4)	67.2 (19.6)	72.6 (22.6)	78.8 (26.0)	84.5 (29.2)	89.8 (32.1)	91.6 (33.1)	92.5 (33.6)	90.1 (32.3)	83.7 (28.7)	75.3 (24.1)	67.5 (19.7)	80.0 (26.7)
Daily mean °F (°C)	55.6 (13.1)	58.3 (14.6)	64.2 (17.9)	71.7 (22.1)	78.4 (25.8)	83.5 (28.6)	85.3 (29.6)	85.6 (29.8)	82.4 (28.0)	75.1 (23.9)	66.1 (18.9)	57.7 (14.3)	72.0 (22.2)
Mean daily minimum °F (°C)	46.0 (7.8)	49.3 (9.6)	55.8 (13.2)	64.5 (18.1)	72.3 (22.4)	77.3 (25.2)	79.1 (26.2)	78.7 (25.9)	74.7 (23.7)	66.5 (19.2)	57.0 (13.9)	47.8 (8.8)	64.1 (17.8)
Record low °F (°C)	14 (−10)	22 (−6)	23 (−5)	38 (3)	48 (9)	57 (14)	64 (18)	64 (18)	50 (10)	29 (−2)	27 (−3)	12 (−11)	12 (−11)
Average precipitation inches (mm)	2.42 (61)	2.20 (56)	2.40 (61)	1.76 (45)	3.10 (79)	3.17 (81)	3.46 (88)	2.57 (65)	5.08 (129)	4.22 (107)	3.02 (77)	1.78 (45)	35.18 (894)
Average snowfall inches (cm)	0.0 (0.0)	0.0 (0.0)	0.0 (0.0)	0.0 (0.0)	0.0 (0.0)	0.0 (0.0)	0.0 (0.0)	0.0 (0.0)	0.0 (0.0)	0.0 (0.0)	0.0 (0.0)	0.2 (0.51)	0.2 (0.51)
Average precipitation days (≥ 0.01 in)	7.3	6.8	5.5	5.1	5.3	6.1	5.5	5.6	8.7	6.5	5.7	6.5	74.6
Average snowy days (≥ 0.1 in)	0.0	0.0	0.0	0.0	0.0	0.0	0.0	0.0	0.0	0.0	0.0	0.0	0.0
Source: NOAA

== Demographics ==
Historical population
Census	Pop.	Note	%±
1890	1,069		—
1900	1,153		7.9%
1910	1,382		19.9%
1920	1,545		11.8%
1930	1,140		−26.2%
1940	1,729		51.7%
1950	2,266		31.1%
1960	2,989		31.9%
1970	3,879		29.8%
1980	3,686		−5.0%
1990	4,753		28.9%
2000	7,385		55.4%
2010	8,766		18.7%
2020	10,070		14.9%
2021 (est.)	10,436		3.6%
U.S. Decennial Census

=== Racial and ethnic composition ===
Rockport city, Texas – Racial and ethnic composition Note: the US Census treats Hispanic/Latino as an ethnic category. This table excludes Latinos from the racial categories and assigns them to a separate category. Hispanics/Latinos may be of any race.
Race / Ethnicity (NH = Non-Hispanic)	Pop 2000	Pop 2010	Pop 2020	% 2000	% 2010	% 2020
White alone (NH)	5,467	6,489	7,070	74.03%	74.02%	70.21%
Black or African American alone (NH)	95	112	121	1.29%	1.28%	1.20%
Native American or Alaska Native alone (NH)	26	37	36	0.35%	0.42%	0.36%
Asian alone (NH)	266	204	268	3.60%	2.33%	2.66%
Native Hawaiian or Pacific Islander alone (NH)	0	5	7	0.00%	0.06%	0.07%
Other race alone (NH)	5	8	24	0.07%	0.09%	0.24%
Mixed race or Multiracial (NH)	86	85	360	1.16%	0.97%	3.57%
Hispanic or Latino (any race)	1,440	1,826	2,184	19.50%	20.83%	21.69%
Total	7,385	8,766	10,070	100.00%	100.00%	100.00%

=== 2020 census ===
As of the 2020 census, there were 10,070 people, 4,417 households, and 2,886 families residing in the city. The median age was 54.2 years, with 16.6% of residents under the age of 18 and 32.4% of residents 65 years of age or older. For every 100 females there were 96.3 males, and for every 100 females age 18 and over there were 93.9 males age 18 and over.

There were 4,417 households in Rockport, of which 20.8% had children under the age of 18 living in them. Of all households, 48.7% were married-couple households, 19.1% were households with a male householder and no spouse or partner present, and 26.0% were households with a female householder and no spouse or partner present. About 31.5% of all households were made up of individuals and 17.0% had someone living alone who was 65 years of age or older. There were 6,646 housing units, of which 33.5% were vacant, with a homeowner vacancy rate of 3.9% and a rental vacancy rate of 20.5%.

87.9% of residents lived in urban areas, while 12.1% lived in rural areas.

Racial composition as of the 2020 census
Race	Number	Percent
White	7,775	77.2%
Black or African American	136	1.4%
American Indian and Alaska Native	73	0.7%
Asian	278	2.8%
Native Hawaiian and Other Pacific Islander	8	0.1%
Some other race	480	4.8%
Two or more races	1,320	13.1%

== Arts and culture ==
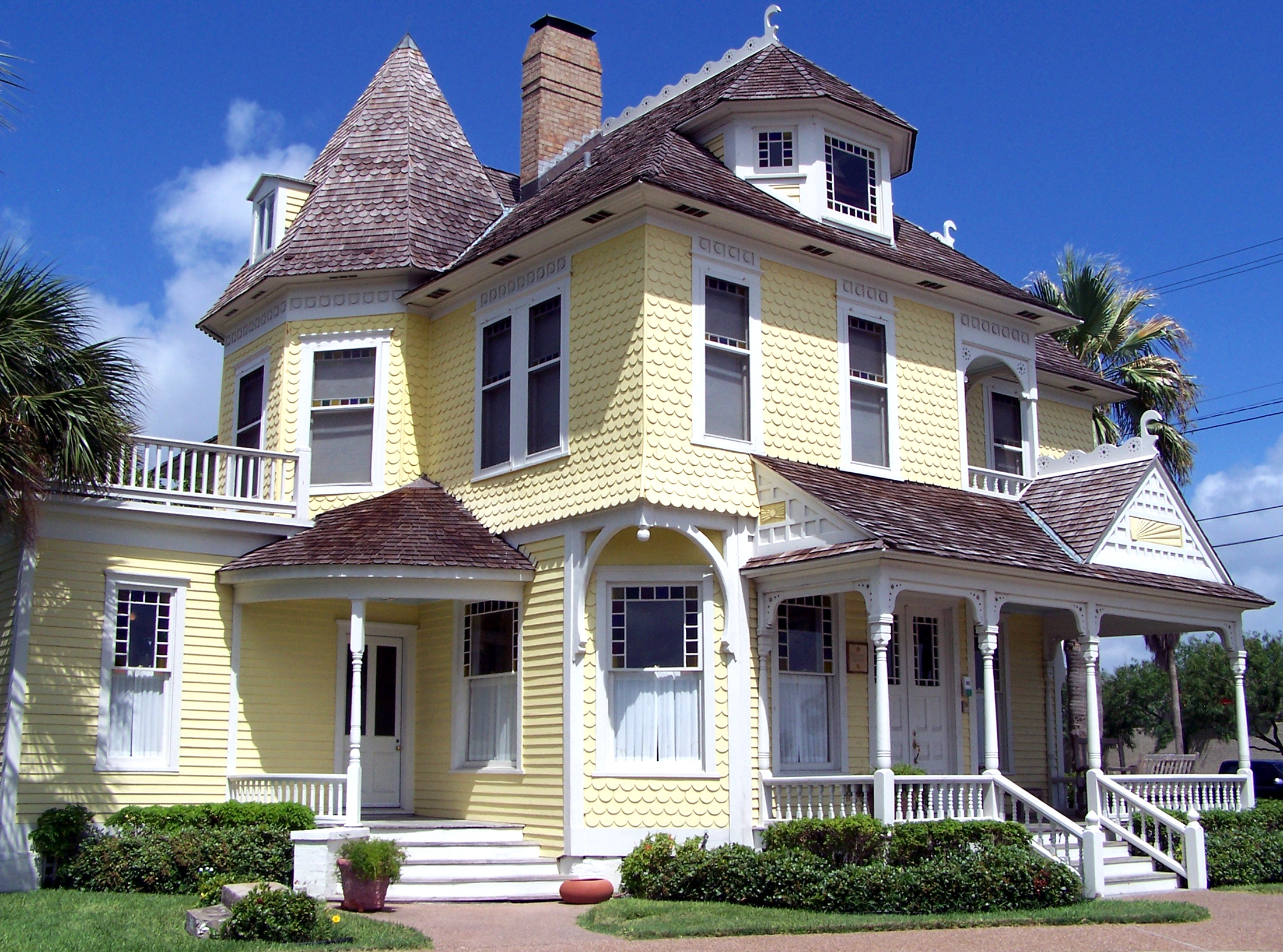
The Hoopes-Smith House in Rockport is listed on the National Register of Historic Places.

=== Area attractions ===
Rockport is a popular tourist destination for its access to various forms of marine recreation and attractions such as boating, fishing (bay, offshore, wade, beach, and pier), duck hunting, waterskiing, swimming, birdwatching, and seafood. The city's largest public beach, Rockport Beach Park, offers an array of community facilities including a playground and two beach pavilions.

The city hosts several fairs and expositions each year including the Seafair, and a Wine Festival. The Rockport Art Festival, held annually since 1970, is a major event with art exhibitions, auctions, and vendors congregating in the city around the Fourth of July holiday. The Rockport Film Festival is another yearly festival that has screened and judged entries since its founding in 2007. Another event taking place in Rockport is the Rockport-Fulton Market Days which occurs on the third Saturday-Sunday of every month. Vendors travel from around the state of Texas to showcase their handmade art, crafts, and more. Featuring live music, 10 or more food trucks, and over 160 vendors each month, this event attracts tourists from around the country. The newest festival taking place in Rockport is the annual Pirate Fest which is in its third year.

Rockport is also home to an aquarium and multiple historic sites such as the Fulton Mansion and the city's heritage district. The community also hosts the Texas Maritime Museum, as well as numerous art galleries, restaurants, and shops. Area visitor accommodations are provided by a wide range of lodgings, from small bed and breakfasts to major hotels and RV facilities.

=== Library ===
The Aransas County Public Library is located at 701 E. Mimosa Street in Rockport.

== Parks and recreation ==
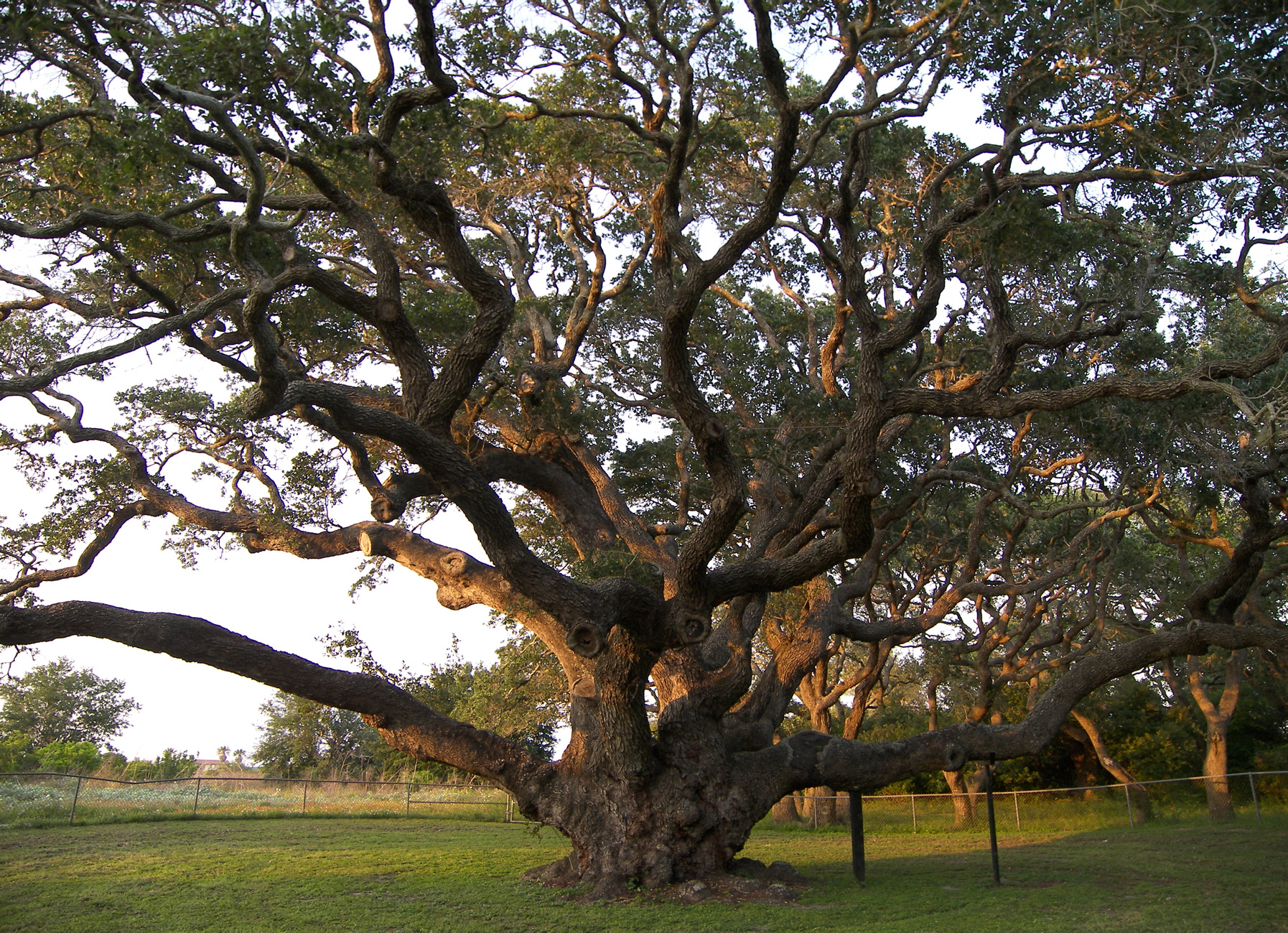
The Big Tree

=== The Big Tree ===
Large windswept live oaks are a dominating feature of the area, and the state's oldest live oak, the "Big Tree", resides on nearby Lamar Peninsula.

=== Rockport Beach Park ===
Rockport Beach Park is a large public beach fronting Aransas Bay. It features two pavilions, a saltwater pool, boat-launching ramps, and various other amenities.

=== Boating and marinas ===
There are a number of marinas, boat-launching ramps, marine service businesses, and ship chandlers in the area (catering to both recreational and commercial vessels of either the sail or power variety). Several marinas are operated by the Aransas County Navigation District. The Key Allegro Marina, with its home-lined canals and party atmosphere, is a popular destination among visitors. There is also a large ski basin called Little Bay that provides an area for water skiing, boating, and jet skiing.

=== The Big Blue Crab ===
The Big Blue Crab is a local park and attraction located on the banks of Little Bay next to the historic Sea View Motel. It features an elevated blue crab sculpture that is the world's largest. Originally constructed in the 1950s, the crab fell apart in the 1970s, but the city rebuilt the attraction in 2012 to even larger proportion. The crab suffered major damage five years later in Hurricane Harvey. As the community got well on its way to restoring and cleaning up the damage left from the storm a group was formed and begin plans to have a new Crab Built and set in the place of the old one. The new Crab would need to be built to be able to withstand not only the ravages of time but also to sustain any future storms that may impact the area. Proposals for artists were sent out and a renowned artist named Joe Barrington was selected for the project. The crab arrived in Aransas County on Tuesday, July 27 and installation began July 28th, 2021.

=== Birdwatching ===
The area around and in Rockport is noted as a prime birdwatching center, located on a major North American migratory bird route, the Central Flyway.

==== Whooping cranes ====
Whooping cranes winter in the large Aransas National Wildlife Refuge located nearby. In late 2025, the Rockport Cultural Arts District celebrated a major conservation win with the securing of over 3,300 acres of habitat for endangered Whooping Cranes adjacent to the Aransas National Wildlife Refuge. Local organizations such as the Aransas Bird and Nature Club have helped preserve unique birdwatching reserves like the Connie Hagar sanctuary and Aransas Woods that are easily accessible. Located along the migration route of several species of hummingbirds, the city hosts an annual "Hummer and Birding Expo" which includes tours of local residences where hundreds of ruby-throated hummingbirds can be viewed at feeders.

The ROCC

New Rockport Center for the Arts (ROCC) Construction completed in late 2022, providing 22,000 square feet of space for the arts community. While the parent organization has been a staple in Rockport since 1969, the specific facility known as "The ROCC" is a brand-new addition to the community.

== Education ==
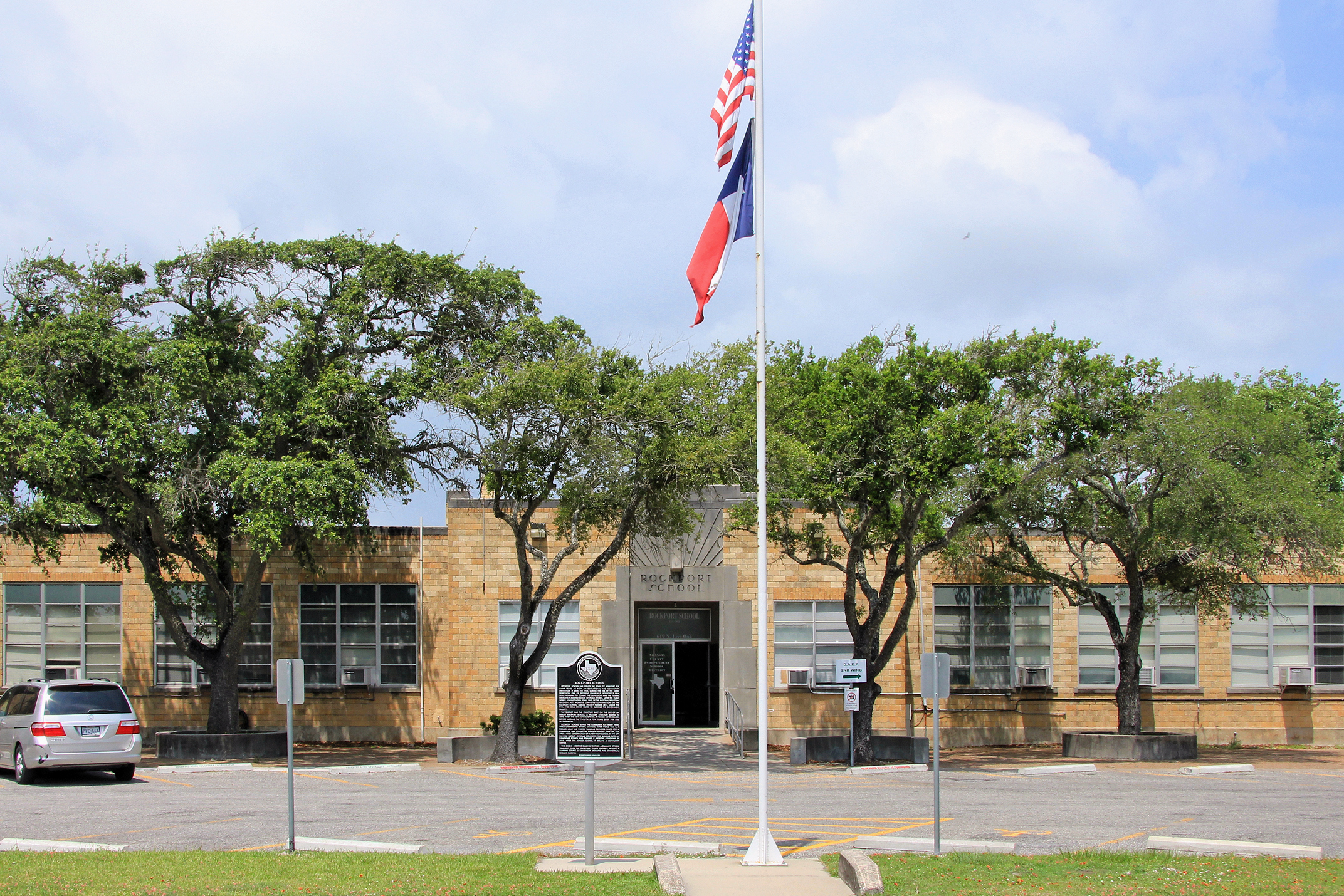
Former Rockport school, 2014

=== Public schools ===
Almost all of Rockport is served by the Aransas County Independent School District (Rockport-Fulton ISD), which provides education from pre-kindergarten through twelfth grade. The district enrolls approximately 3,000 students and operates multiple elementary campuses, an intermediate school, a middle school, and Rockport-Fulton High School.

Rockport-Fulton High School offers academic programs, athletics, fine arts, and career and technical education (CTE) pathways intended to prepare students for postsecondary education and the workforce. The district has reported a graduation rate above the Texas state average.

Schools in the district were significantly impacted by Hurricane Harvey in 2017, which caused damage to several campuses; facilities have since been rebuilt and updated.

A small portion of Rockport is zoned to the Aransas Pass Independent School District.

=== Private education ===
Sacred Heart School, a private Catholic school serving grades pre-kindergarten through elementary levels, also serves the Rockport community.

== Notable people ==
- Ernie Caceres, musician
- Guy Clark, American country and folk singer, musician, songwriter, recording artist, and performer
- Sarah Johnston, WNBA player
- Dat Nguyen, football player; grew up in Rockport
- Margaret Skeete, oldest living American during 1993 and 1994, and the oldest person ever from Texas
- John H. Wood, Jr., first federal judge assassinated in the 20th century
- George Strait, country singer: also retired in Rockport
- Bill Williams, game designer and author, creator of Mind Walker
- Alex Bardin, driver for Monster Jam
