= Fulton Mansion Historical Site =

Historic house in Texas, United States

- George W. Fulton Mansion
- U.S. National Register of Historic Places
- Texas State Historic Site
- Texas State Antiquities Landmark
- Recorded Texas Historic Landmark
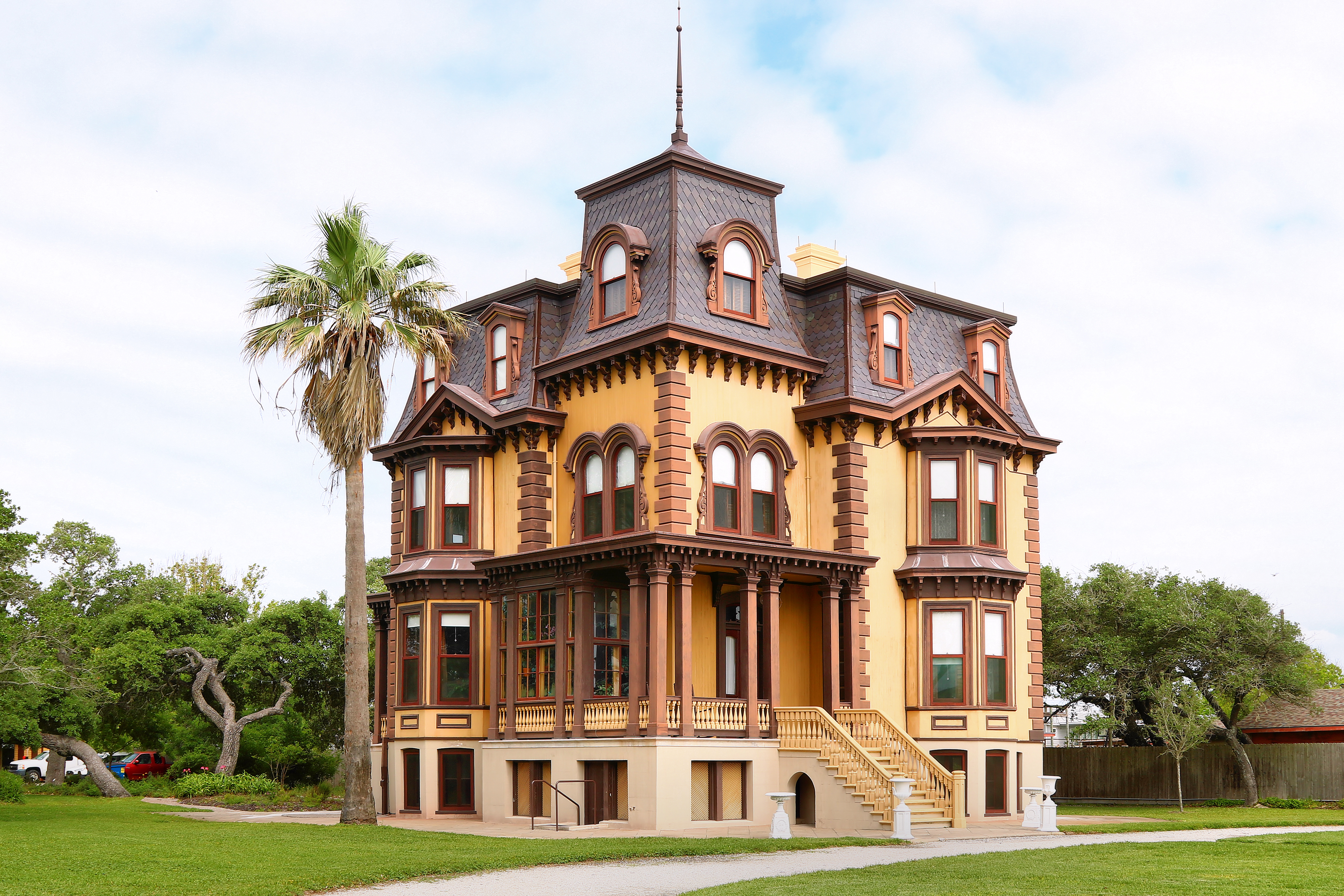
- The Fulton Mansion in 2024.

- Location within Texas Location within the United States
- Interactive map showing the location of George W. Fulton Mansion
- Location: Fulton Beach Rd, Fulton, Texas
- Coordinates: 28°3′28″N 97°2′8″W
- Area: 1 acre (0.40 ha)
- Built: 1872
- Architectural style: Second Empire
- NRHP reference No.: 75001945
- TSAL No.: 8200000016
- RTHL No.: 2083

Significant dates
- Added to NRHP: April 24, 1975
- Designated TSHS: 1976
- Designated TSAL: January 1, 1983
- Designated RTHL: 1964

The Fulton Mansion State Historic Site is located in Fulton on the Texas Gulf Coast, in the county of Aransas, in the U.S. state of Texas. It is one of the earliest Second Empire style buildings constructed in Texas and is one of the most important of the style in the Southwest United States still in existence. Colonel George Ware Fulton and Harriet Gillette Smith began building the 4 story structure overlooking Aransas Bay in 1874 and finished in 1877. The residence, dubbed "Oakhurst" by its owners George & Harriet, featured the most up-to-date conveniences for the time, such as indoor plumbing reaching sinks in every bedroom, gas lighting and central heating, along with three bathrooms and two built-in copper tubs.

== History ==
Joe and Lillian Davidson owned the mansion from 1907 to 1943. In 1952 the May family bought the house, planted the palms still in front of the house, and turned the grounds into an RV park. Felix and Gladys Boldin bought the property in the early 1960s and continued to run the RV park, selling it in 1969 to the Copelands, who also ran the RV park until Mr. Copeland died in 1974. Mrs. Copeland sold the dilapidated house to the state in 1976.

The mansion was added to the National Register of Historic Places in 1975. When the State of Texas purchased the mansion and 2.3 acres (0.93 ha) it was restored and opened to the public in 1983. On January 1, 2008, Fulton Mansion was transferred from the Texas Parks and Wildlife Department to the Texas Historical Commission and is now operated as the Fulton Mansion State Historic Site. From early 2013 through the fall of 2015 the house underwent a second, intensive restoration.

== See also ==
- List of Texas state historic sites
- National Register of Historic Places listings in Aransas County, Texas
- Recorded Texas Historic Landmarks in Aransas County
