= Hurricane Harvey =

Category 4 Atlantic hurricane in 2017

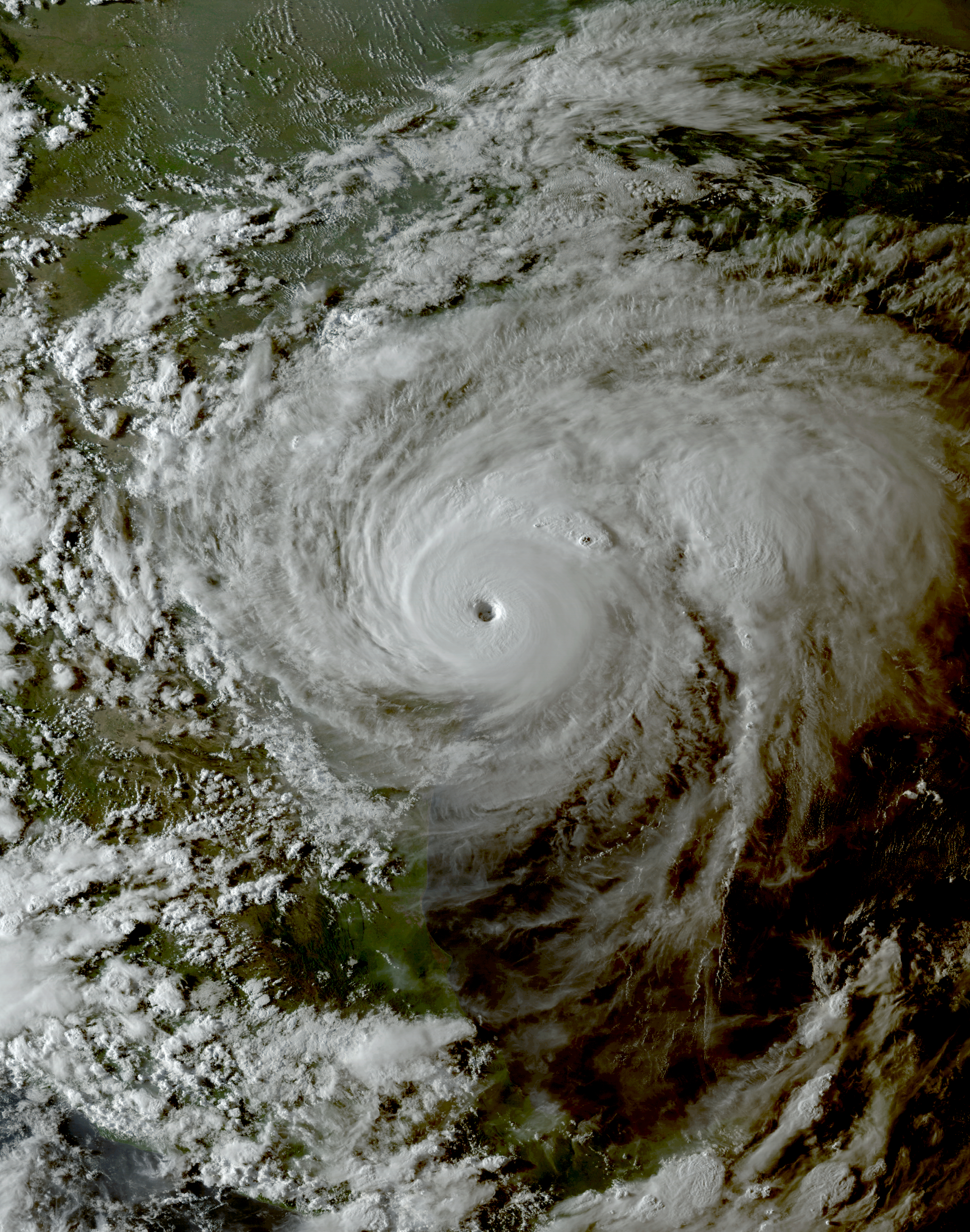
- Harvey at its peak intensity prior to landfall in Southern Texas late on August 25

Meteorological history
- Formed: August 17, 2017
- Extratropical: September 1, 2017
- Dissipated: September 2, 2017

Category 4 major hurricane
- 1-minute sustained (SSHWS/NWS)
- Highest winds: 130 mph (215 km/h)
- Lowest pressure: 937 mbar (hPa); 27.67 inHg

Overall effects
- Fatalities: 107
- Damage: $125 billion (2017 USD) (Tied as the costliest tropical cyclone on record)
- Areas affected: Windward Islands, Suriname, Guyana, Nicaragua, Honduras, Belize, Cayman Islands, Yucatán Peninsula, Southern and Eastern United States (especially Texas and Louisiana)
- IBTrACS
- Part of the 2017 Atlantic hurricane season
- History • Meteorological history Effects • Texas Other wikis • Commons: Harvey images

Hurricane Harvey was a powerful and catastrophic tropical cyclone that made landfall in Texas and Louisiana in August 2017, causing widespread flooding and more than 100 deaths. It is tied with 2005's Hurricane Katrina as the costliest tropical cyclone on record, (Note: When Katrina's cost is unadjusted for inflation.) inflicting $125 billion (2017 USD) in damage, primarily from catastrophic rainfall-triggered flooding in Greater Houston and Southeast Texas; this made the storm the costliest natural disaster recorded in Texas at the time. It was the first major hurricane (Note: A major hurricane is a hurricane that ranks as Category 3 or higher on the Saffir–Simpson scale.) to make landfall in the United States since Wilma in 2005, ending a record 12-year span. In a four-day period, many areas received more than 40 inches (1,000 mm) of rain as the system slowly meandered over eastern Texas and adjacent waters, causing unprecedented flooding. With peak accumulations of 60.58 in (1,539 mm) in Nederland, Texas, Harvey was the wettest tropical cyclone on record in the United States. The resulting floods inundated hundreds of thousands of homes, which displaced more than 30,000 people and prompted more than 17,000 rescues.

The eighth named storm, third hurricane, and first major hurricane of the extremely active 2017 Atlantic hurricane season, Harvey developed from a tropical wave to the east of the Lesser Antilles, reaching tropical storm status on August 17. The storm crossed through the Windward Islands on the following day, making landfall on the southern end of Barbados and a second landfall on Saint Vincent. Upon entering the Caribbean, Harvey began to weaken due to moderate wind shear, and degenerated into a tropical wave north of Colombia, late on August 19. The remnants were monitored for regeneration as it continued west-northwestward across the Caribbean and the Yucatán Peninsula, before redeveloping over the Bay of Campeche on August 23. Harvey then began to rapidly intensify on August 24, regaining tropical storm status and becoming a hurricane later that day.

While the storm moved generally northwest, Harvey's intensification phase stalled slightly overnight from August 24–25; however, Harvey soon resumed strengthening and quickly became a Category 4 hurricane later that day with peak 1-minute sustained winds of 130 mph. Hours later, Harvey made landfall at San José Island, Texas, at peak intensity, followed by another landfall at Holiday Beach at Category 3 intensity. Rapid weakening then ensued, and Harvey had downgraded to a tropical storm as it stalled near the coastline, dropping torrential and unprecedented amounts of rainfall over Texas. On August 28, the storm emerged back over the Gulf of Mexico, strengthening slightly before making a fifth and final landfall in Louisiana on August 29. As Harvey drifted inland, it quickly weakened again as it became an extratropical cyclone on September 1, before dissipating two days afterwards.

In addition to the huge cost and extent of the damage it caused, Harvey caused at least 107 confirmed deaths: 106 in the United States plus 1 in Guyana. Due to the extensive damage, the name Harvey was retired in April 2018 and will not be used for another Atlantic tropical cyclone.

== Meteorological history ==
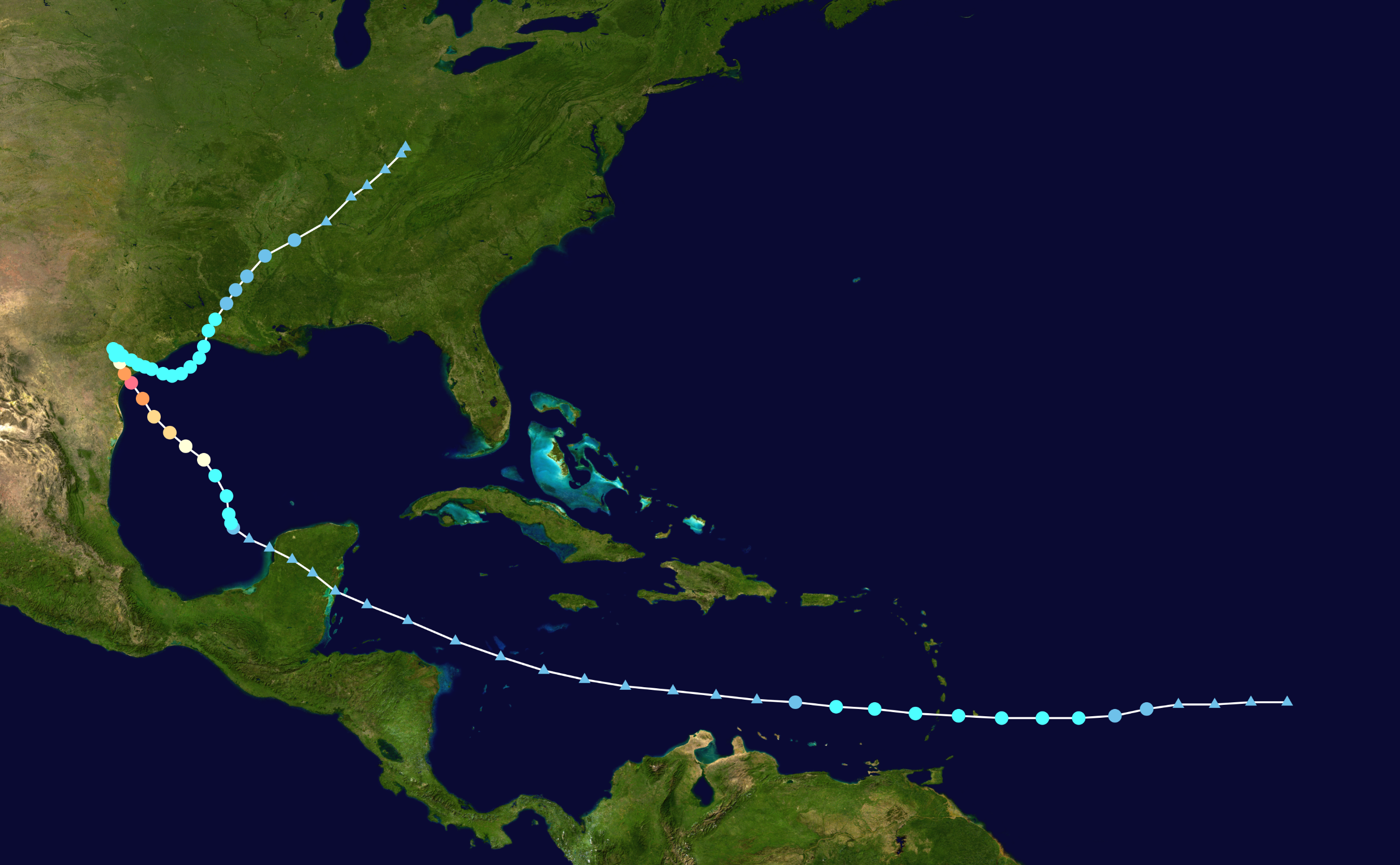
Map plotting the storm's track and intensity, according to the Saffir–Simpson scale Map key Saffir–Simpson scale Tropical depression (≤38 mph, ≤62 km/h) Tropical storm (39–73 mph, 63–118 km/h) Category 1 (74–95 mph, 119–153 km/h) Category 2 (96–110 mph, 154–177 km/h) Category 3 (111–129 mph, 178–208 km/h) Category 4 (130–156 mph, 209–251 km/h) Category 5 (≥157 mph, ≥252 km/h) Unknown Storm type Tropical cyclone Subtropical cyclone Extratropical cyclone, remnant low, tropical disturbance, or monsoon depression

A westward-moving tropical wave emerged from Africa over the eastern Atlantic Ocean on August 12. A surface circulation slowly developed and convection consolidated around the low over the subsequent days; the system became a tropical depression on August 17. Maintaining its brisk westward motion, the system strengthened slightly and became a tropical storm later that day, at which time it was assigned the name Harvey. With maximum sustained winds of 45 mph (70 km/h), Harvey made landfalls in Barbados and St. Vincent on August 18 before entering the Caribbean. Hostile environmental conditions, namely wind shear, imparted weakening and caused Harvey to degenerate into a tropical wave by August 19. Though it lacked an organized surface low, the remnants of Harvey continued to produce significant convection as it traversed the Caribbean Sea and Yucatán Peninsula. The system reached the Bay of Campeche in the Gulf of Mexico on August 23 and soon consolidated around a new surface low.

Late on August 23, the remnants of Harvey regenerated into a tropical cyclone and re-attained tropical storm intensity by 18:00 UTC. Initial reorganization was slow; however, within a highly favorable environment, the system soon underwent rapid intensification as an eye developed and its central pressure quickly fell. After becoming a hurricane on August 24, Harvey continued to quickly strengthen over the next day, ultimately reaching peak intensity as a Category 4 hurricane. Around 03:00 UTC on August 26, the hurricane made landfall at peak intensity on San Jose Island, just east of Rockport, with winds of 130 mph (210 km/h) and an atmospheric pressure of 937 mbar (27.7 inHg). It made a second landfall on the Texas mainland, at Rockport, three hours later in a slightly weakened state. Harvey became the first major hurricane to make landfall in the United States since Wilma in 2005.

Hurricane Harvey as seen by NASA aboard the International Space Station on August 25.

Once Harvey moved inland, it began to weaken rapidly as its speed slowed dramatically to a crawl, and Harvey weakened to a tropical storm on August 26. For about two days the storm stalled just inland, dropping very heavy rainfall and causing catastrophic flash flooding. Harvey's center drifted back towards the southeast, ultimately re-emerging into the Gulf of Mexico on August 28. Once offshore, the poorly organized system struggled against strong wind shear. Deep convection persisted north of the cyclone's center near the Houston metropolitan area along a stationary front, resulting in several days of record-breaking rain. Early on August 30, the former hurricane made its fifth and final landfall just west of Cameron, Louisiana, with winds of 45 mph (70 km/h). Associated convection with Harvey became focused north of the center and along a warm front on September 1 as it moved further inland, indicating that the system transitioned into a post-tropical cyclone by 06:00 UTC that day. The remnants continued northeastwards before being absorbed into another extratropical system on September 3.

== Preparations ==
=== Caribbean and Latin America ===
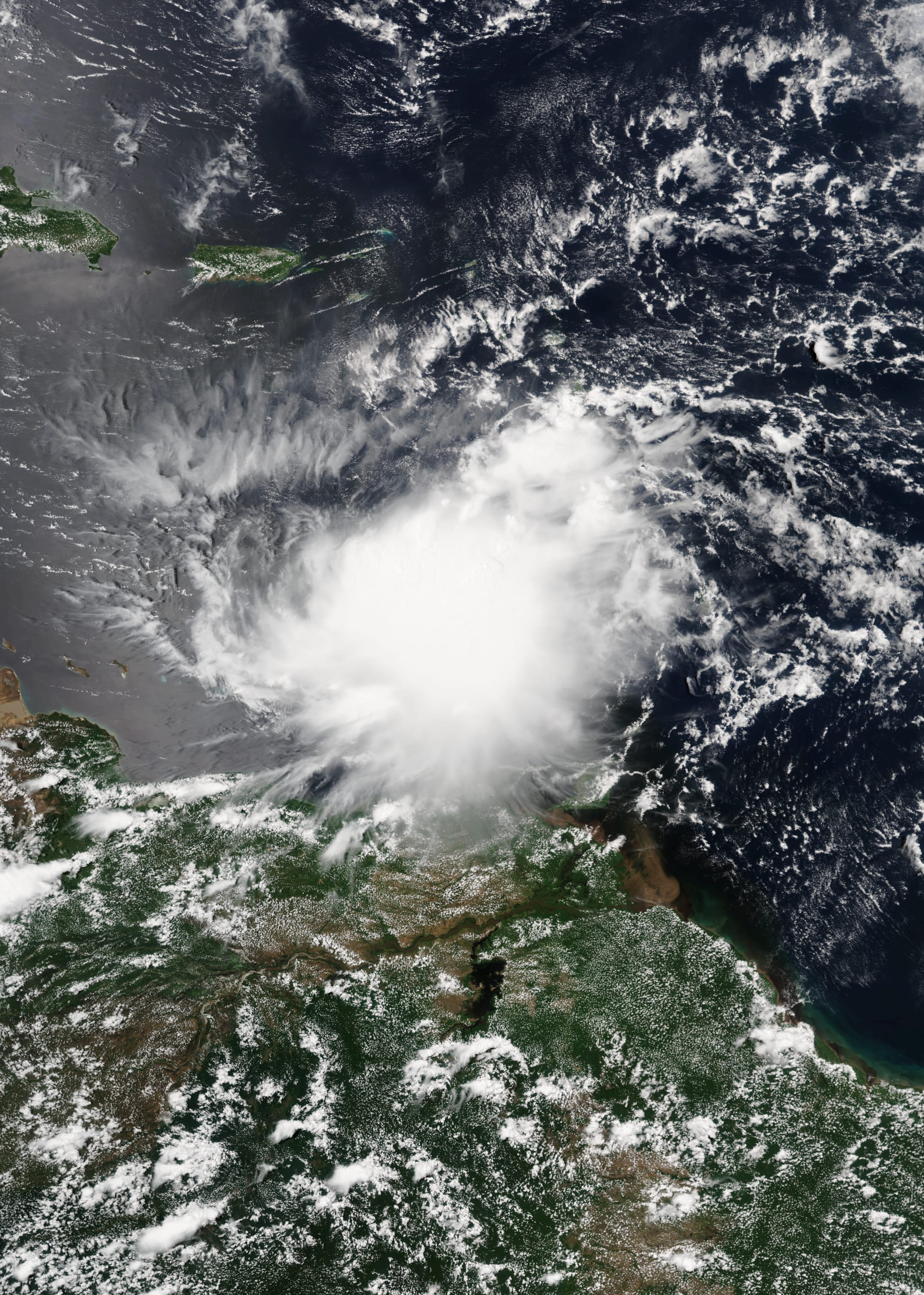
Tropical Storm Harvey in the Eastern Caribbean on August 18.

Tropical cyclone warnings and watches for the Windward Islands were issued starting at 15:00 UTC on August 17, about six hours before Harvey developed. At that time, a tropical storm watch was posted for Dominica, while a tropical storm warning became in effect in Barbados, Martinique, Saint Lucia, and Saint Vincent and the Grenadines. All watches and warnings were discontinued by late on August 18, as the storm continued westward into the Caribbean.

In Honduras, a green alert was issued for the Atlántida, Islas de la Bahía, Colón, Cortés, Gracias a Dios, Olancho, and Yoro departments. About 8 inches (200 mm) of precipitation was expected along the coast, while inland areas were forecast to receive 2.76 to 3.15 in (70 to 80 mm) of rain. As the remnants of Harvey approached Mexico, the Civil Protection Secretary of the state of Campeche issued a blue alert, indicating minimal danger. When Harvey redeveloped at 15:00 UTC on August 23, the Government of Mexico issued a tropical storm watch in Tamaulipas from Boca de Catan to the mouth of the Rio Grande. The watch remained in effect until 21:00 UTC on August 25, after it became evident that the storm no longer posed a significant threat to that area.

=== United States ===
FEMA worked with the Coast Guard, Customs and Border Protection, and Immigration and Customs Enforcement to prepare for the storm and its aftermath. The agency placed disaster response teams on standby at emergency posts in Austin, Texas, and Baton Rouge, Louisiana.

==== Texas ====
Upon the NHC resuming advisories for Harvey at 15:00 UTC on August 23, a hurricane watch was issued in Texas from Port Mansfield to San Luis Pass, while a tropical storm watch was posted from Port Mansfield south to the mouth of the Rio Grande and from San Luis Pass to High Island. Additionally, a storm surge watch became in effect from Port Mansfield to High Island. Additional watches and warnings were posted in these areas at 09:00 UTC on August 24, with a hurricane warning from Port Mansfield to Matagorda; a tropical storm warning from Matagorda to High Island; a hurricane watch and tropical storm warning from Port Mansfield to the Rio Grande; a storm surge warning from Port Mansfield to San Luis Pass; and a storm surge watch from Port Mansfield to the Rio Grande. As the hurricane neared landfall on August 24, an extreme wind warning—indicating an immediate threat of 115–145 mph (185–235 km/h) winds—was issued for areas expected to be impacted by the eyewall; this included parts of Aransas, Calhoun, Nueces, Refugio, and San Patricio counties. The watches and warnings were adjusted accordingly after Harvey moved inland and began weakening, with the warning discontinued at 15:00 UTC on August 26. By 09:00 UTC on the following day, only a tropical storm warning and a storm surge warning remained in effect from Port O'Connor to Sargent. However, watches and warnings were re-issued as Harvey began to re-emerge into the Gulf of Mexico, and beginning at 15:00 UTC on August 28, a tropical storm warning was in effect for the entire Gulf Coast of Texas from High Island northward.

Governor Greg Abbott declared a state of emergency for 30 counties on August 23, while mandatory evacuations were issued for Calhoun, Jackson, Refugio, San Patricio, and Victoria counties, as well as parts of Brazoria, and Matagorda counties. On August 26, Governor Abbott added an additional 20 counties to the state of emergency declaration. Furthermore, the International Charter on Space and Major Disasters was activated by the USGS on behalf of the Governor's Texas Emergency Management Council, including the Texas Division of Emergency Management, thus providing for humanitarian satellite coverage.

==== Louisiana ====
In Louisiana, Governor John Bel Edwards declared a state of emergency for the entire state. A mandatory evacuation was ordered in Cameron Parish for the cities of Big Lake, Cameron, Creole, Grand Chenier, Hackberry, Holly Beach, and Johnson Bayou. Additionally, a voluntary evacuation was ordered in Vermilion Parish for low-lying areas south of State Highway 14. The Louisiana National Guard prepared about 500,000 sandbags and emergency boats and high-water-rescue vehicles were placed on standby should flooding occur. In New Orleans, there were concerns about whether or not the city's drainage system could handle a heavy rainfall event, with only 105 of the 120 water pumps being operational and some power turbines being out of service. The city's public schools, as well as six universities and a medical school, closed on August 29. As Harvey began re-emerging into the Gulf of Mexico on August 28, the tropical storm warning in Texas from Mesquite Bay to High Island was extended eastward into Louisiana to the community of Cameron at 12:00 UTC, while a tropical storm watch was issued from Cameron to Intracoastal City.

==== Video briefings by officials ====
Comments from the White House (begin at 25:50)

Comments from National Weather Service director Louis Uccellini

Shelter in place briefing by FEMA

Comments by the Governor of Texas

== Impact ==
=== Caribbean and Latin America ===
Winds left residents throughout Barbados without electricity, with a majority of outages occurring in Christ Church, Saint Joseph, Saint Lucy, and Saint Michael provinces. Flooding washed one house off its foundation, while water entered some houses, forcing some people to evacuate. Bridges in Saint Andrew and Saint Joseph were damaged. Additionally, a fuel depot in Speightstown was flooded. Winds from Harvey ripped the roof off a church. In Saint Vincent and the Grenadines, nine homes were flooded and four others experienced wind damage. Also, a tree fell on a school, damaging the building. Blocked drains in Port Elizabeth resulted in more than 15 businesses being flooded. A total of 15 people were housed in shelters after the storm.

Strong winds and heavy rainfall also affected Suriname and Guyana. In the former, high winds in the capital city of Paramaribo caused roof damage to the Presidential Palace and two homes, while the Torarica Hotel and Casino suffered structural impact. Additionally, four dwellings were deroofed in Commewijne and three others lost their roofs in Wanica; in the latter, the Ministry of Social Affairs building was damaged by falling trees. In Guyana, the village of Jawalla bore the brunt of the storm. Four homes were demolished, while five other residences and two shops were damaged. Several public buildings were also damaged, including the community center, the village council buildings, the nursery, and public schools. A 29-year-old woman died after her house collapsed on her.

=== United States ===
Satellite loop of Harvey making landfall in Texas on August 26

The widespread and catastrophic effects of Hurricane Harvey resulted in one of the costliest natural disasters in United States history. An estimated 300,000 structures and 500,000 vehicles were damaged or destroyed in Texas alone. The storm also spawned 53 tornadoes across six states. The National Oceanic and Atmospheric Administration estimated total damage at $125 billion, with a 90% confidence interval of $90–160 billion. The scope of flooding in areas with low National Flood Insurance Program (NFIP) participation lends to the large uncertainty in the damage total. This ranks Harvey as the costliest tropical cyclone on record in the country alongside Hurricane Katrina in 2005. However, accounting for inflation and cost increases since 2005, the National Hurricane Center considers Harvey the second-costliest. Harvey was the costliest natural disaster recorded in Texas at the time, until it was surpassed in February 2021 by a severe winter storm that crippled the state's power grid, which was estimated to have cost at least $195 billion (2021 USD) in damages in Texas. Nationwide, 107 people died in storm-related incidents: 103 in Texas, 2 in Arkansas, 1 in Tennessee, and 1 in Kentucky. Of the deaths in Texas, 68 were from the direct effects of Harvey, the highest such number in the state since 1919.

==== Texas ====
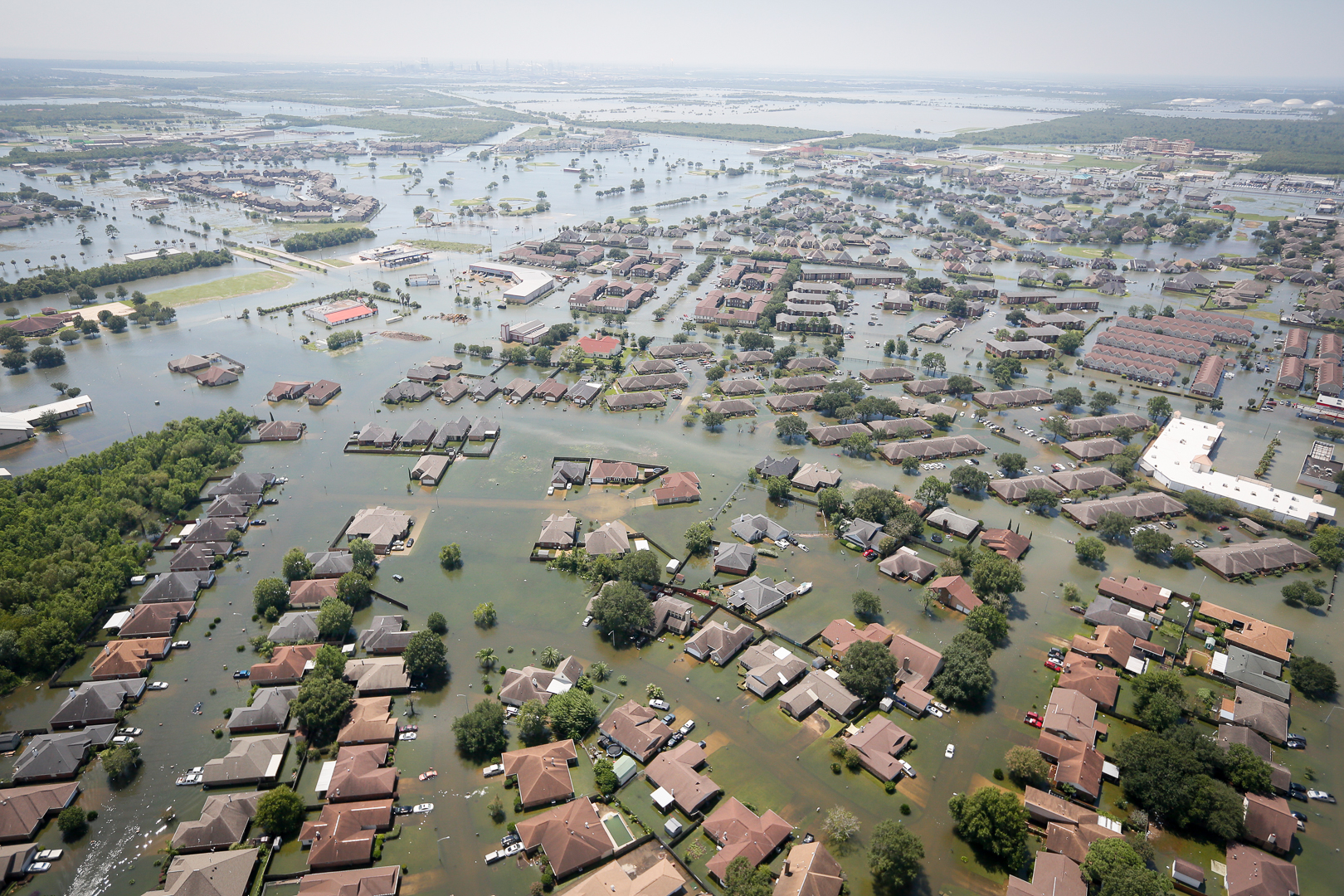
Flooding in Port Arthur, Texas, on August 31.

Twenty-two weak tornadoes touched down throughout the state. An EF1 tornado near Fresno caused some minor injuries.

Throughout Texas, approximately 336,000 people were left without electricity and tens of thousands required rescue. Throughout the state, 103 people died in storm-related incidents: 68 from its direct effects, including flooding, and 35 from indirect effects in the hurricane's aftermath. By August 29, 2017, approximately 13,000 people had been rescued across the state while an estimated 30,000 were displaced. The refinery industry capacity was reduced, and oil and gas production was affected in the Gulf of Mexico and inland Texas. On Monday, the closure of oil refineries ahead of Hurricane Harvey created a fuel shortage. Panicked motorists waited in long lines. Consequently, gas stations through the state were forced to close due to the rush. More than 20 percent of refining capacity was affected.

More than 48,700 homes were affected by Harvey throughout the state, including over 1,000 that were completely destroyed and more than 17,000 that sustained major damage; approximately 32,000 sustained minor damage. Nearly 700 businesses were damaged as well. Yet the Texas Department of Public Safety stated more than 185,000 homes were damaged and 9,000 destroyed.

The hurricane also caused many people to believe that in the wild, only 10 individuals of Attwater's prairie-chicken remained at most until Spring 2018, when it was discovered that there were about a dozen wild individuals left.

==== Louisiana ====
Infrared satellite loop of Harvey making its third U.S. landfall in Louisiana on August 30

Heavy rainfall extended eastward into Louisiana, with the state recording up to 14.88 in (378 mm) of precipitation near the town of Iowa. In the city of Lake Charles, flood waters reached 4 ft (1.2 m) in height in some areas, with homes inundated and hundreds of people forced to evacuate in one neighborhood alone. Throughout the state, about 500 people were rescued by August 28, while 269 people went to a shelter in southwest Louisiana, about 200 of whom were rescued from their homes. An EF2 tornado near Evangeline damaged four homes, one of which was destroyed. The tornado also damaged fences, a motorcycle, a pickup truck, and toppled three electrical poles.

==== Elsewhere ====
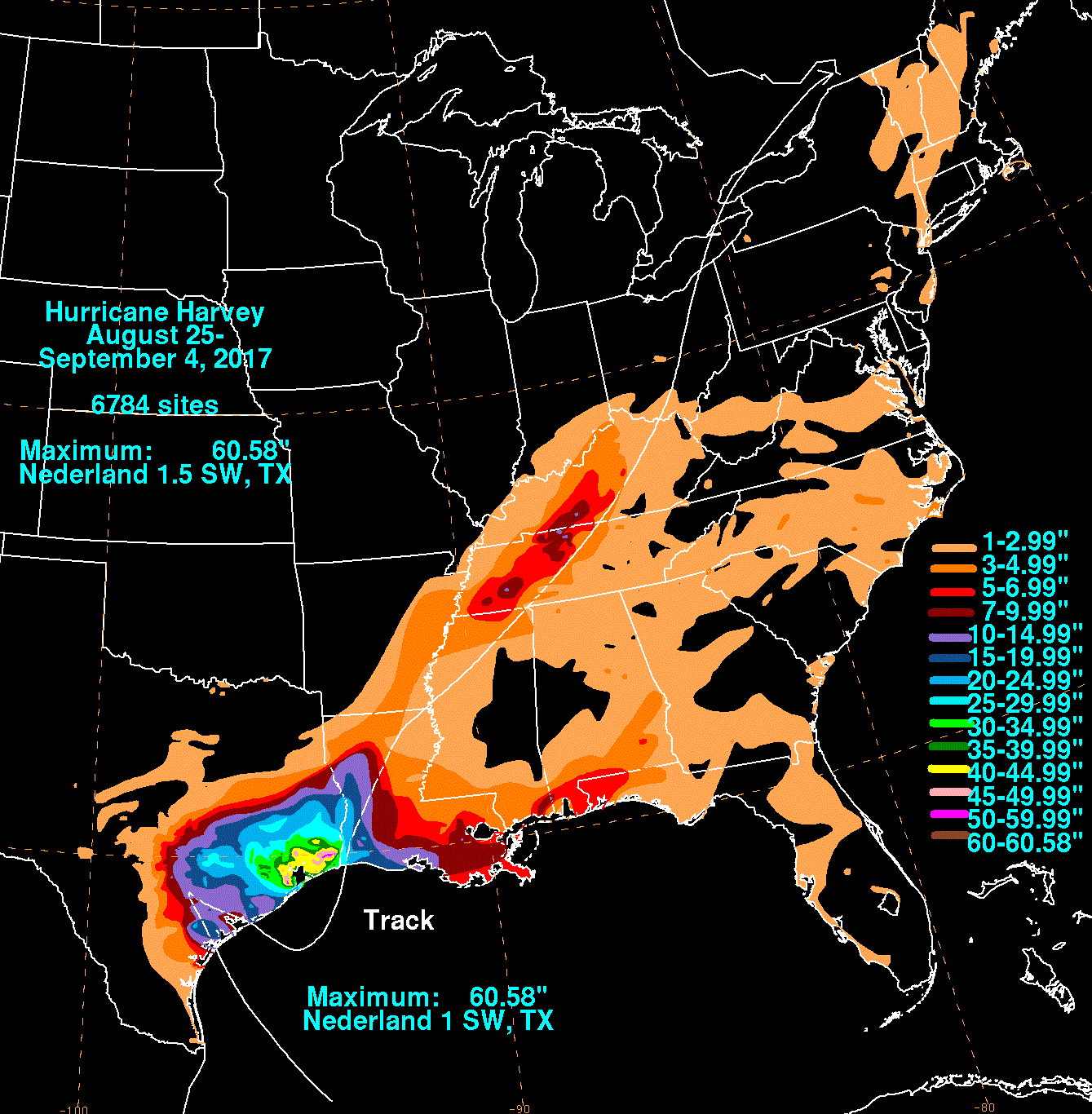
Map of the total rainfall from Hurricane Harvey in the United States.

Rain-slicked roads were blamed for two fatal accidents in Arkansas. In Alabama, an unusually long-tracked EF2 tornado in the vicinity of Reform and Palmetto damaged two homes and destroyed a barn along SR 17, while four people were hospitalized for their injuries. The same tornado also caused damage to trees and roofs in Lamar County near Kennedy and additional damage in Fayette County, causing two more injuries.
Another EF2 tornado in Arab destroyed chicken houses and damaged homes and trees. In Tennessee, more than 19,000 people lost electricity in Memphis. Low-lying streets in the area were inundated with water. One indirect death occurred in Memphis due to a weather-related head-on collision of a car and a tractor trailer on I-40. Heavy rainfall in Nashville inundated a number of roads and flooded an apartment complex, resulting in the evacuation of 13 people. Overall, about 50 people in the city evacuated from flooded areas. An EF1 tornado also touched down in the northeastern side of the city, damaging trees, homes, carports, and power lines. An additional EF0 tornado on the southeastern side of the city damaged trees, a carport, a warehouse, and a garage, while also flipping an 18-wheeler. Rain in Kentucky was blamed for a fatal car accident.

On September 1, the outer bands of Harvey's remnants passed through North Carolina. Severe weather was reported across the central part of the state. High wind knocked out power in Fuquay-Varina, Sanford, and Holly Springs, and large hail hit parts of Wake, Harnett, and Johnston counties. In Willow Spring, hail larger than softballs damaged homes and cars. Flash flooding hit Greenville further east. Tornadoes were also reported in Angier, Clayton, and Smithfield, but they were unconfirmed.

==== Energy production ====
Energy production in the Gulf of Mexico declined in the wake of Harvey by approximately 21% — the output dropped to 378,633 barrels per day from the original 1.75 million barrels of oil produced each day. The Eagle Ford Rock Formation (shale oil and gas) in southern Texas reduced production by 300,000 to 500,000 bpd, according to the Texas Railroad Commission. Many energy-related ports and terminals closed, delaying about fourteen crude oil tankers. About 2.25 million bpd of refining capacity was offline for several days; that is about 12% of total US capacity, with refineries affected at Corpus Christi, and later Port Arthur and Beaumont, and Lake Charles, Louisiana. The price of Brent crude versus West Texas Intermediate crude oil achieved a split of U.S. $5.

Two ExxonMobil refineries had to be shut down following related storm damage and releases of hazardous pollutants. Two oil storage tanks owned by Burlington Resources Oil and Gas collectively spilled 30,000 gallons of crude in DeWitt County. An additional 8,500 gallons of wastewater was spilled in the incidents.

On August 30, the CEO of Arkema warned one of its chemical plants in Crosby, Texas, could explode or be subject to intense fire due to the loss of "critical refrigeration" of materials. All workers at the facility and residents within 1.5 mi (2.4 km) were evacuated. Eight of the plant's nine refrigeration units failed without power, enabling the stored chemicals to decompose and become combustible. Two explosions occurred around 2:00 a.m. on August 31; 21 emergency personnel were briefly hospitalized.

Due to the shutdown in refineries, gas prices did see an increase nationwide. However, the increase was not as extensive as Hurricane Katrina. Additionally, Harvey's impact coincided with Labor Day Weekend, which sees a traditional increase in gas prices due to the heavy travel for that weekend. Nonetheless, the spike brought the highest gas prices in two years.

==== Sports ====
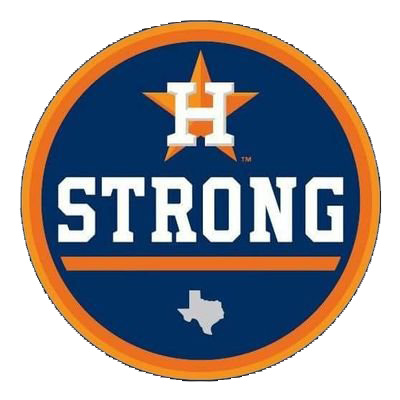
In the aftermath of the storm, the Houston Astros began wearing this patch during the 2017 season in support of the storm's victims in Houston. They eventually went on to win the World Series.

The flooding in Houston from the storm required the traditional Governor's Cup National Football League preseason game between the Dallas Cowboys and the Houston Texans scheduled for August 31 to be moved from NRG Stadium in Houston to AT&T Stadium in Arlington, Texas. The game was later canceled to allow the Houston Texans players to return to Houston after the storm. In addition, the Houston Astros were forced to move their August 29–31 series with the Texas Rangers from Minute Maid Park in Houston to Tropicana Field in St. Petersburg, Florida; ironically, just two weeks later, Hurricane Irma would force the stadium's regular tenants, the Tampa Bay Rays, to move three home games to Citi Field in New York City. In the aftermath, the Houston Astros began to wear patches which had the logo of the team with the word "Strong" on the bottom of the patch, as well as promoting the hashtag Houston Strong, prominently displaying them as the Astros won the 2017 World Series. Manager A. J. Hinch has stated in an interview that the team wasn't just playing for a title, but to help boost moral support for the city. The annual Texas Kickoff game that was to feature BYU and LSU to kick off the 2017 college football season was moved to the Mercedes-Benz Superdome in New Orleans. The NCAA FBS football game between Houston and UTSA was postponed due to the aftermath of the storm. It was originally scheduled for September 2 at the Alamodome in San Antonio and was ultimately canceled.

The Houston Dynamo rescheduled a planned Major League Soccer match against Sporting Kansas City on August 26 to October 11. The Houston Dash of the National Women's Soccer League rescheduled their August 27 match against the North Carolina Courage to a later date. Both teams moved their training camps to Toyota Stadium in Frisco, Texas (near Dallas) while preparing for their next matches; the Dash's match the following week, against the Seattle Reign, was played in Frisco, with all proceeds from ticket sales benefiting an American Red Cross relief fund for hurricane victims. The Dynamo and Major League Soccer also donated a combined $1 million into the hurricane relief fund, while also opening BBVA Compass Stadium to accept donated supplies for processing and distribution.

Athletic events were rescheduled as far away as Kentucky, where the storm's remnants were expected to cause heavy rains on September 1, interfering with Friday night high school football. More than 50 high schools in the state moved games that had been scheduled for Friday to either Thursday or Saturday.

== Aftermath ==
President Trump participating in a tour of the Emergency Operations Center, video from the White House

Interview with Sylvester Turner and Al Sharpton on September 1, 2017 – from MSNBC

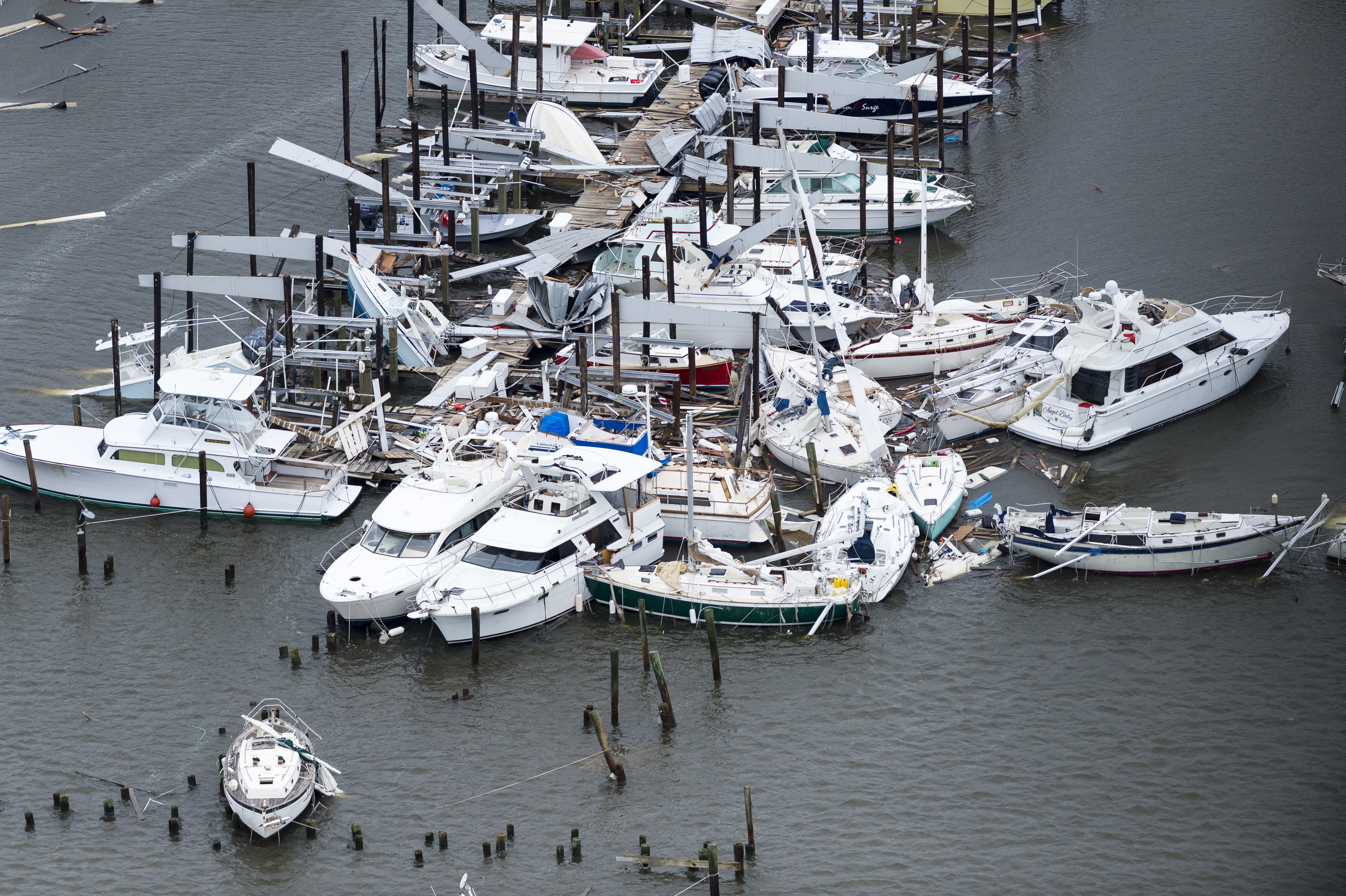
Damage by Harvey to a marina in Rockport, Texas, on August 28, 2017

=== Texas ===
Houston Mayor Sylvester Turner imposed a mandatory curfew on August 29 from midnight to 5 a.m. local time until further notice. He cited looting as the primary reason for the curfew. On August 29, President Trump, First Lady Melania Trump, and U.S. Senators John Cornyn and Ted Cruz toured damage in the Corpus Christi metropolitan area. President Trump made a formal request for $5.95 billion in federal funding on August 31 for affected areas, the vast majority of which would go to FEMA.

Texas Governor Greg Abbott deployed the state's entire National Guard for search and rescue, recovery, and clean up operations due to the devastating damage caused by the storm and resulting floods. Other states' National Guard's have offered assistance, with several having already been sent. Meanwhile, the United States Immigration and Customs Enforcement assigned approximately 150 employees from around the country to assist with disaster relief efforts, while stating that no immigration enforcement operations would be conducted.

Approximately 32,000 people were displaced in shelters across the state by August 31. The George R. Brown Convention Center, the state's largest shelter, reached capacity with 8,000 evacuees. The NRG Center opened as a large public shelter accordingly. More than 210,000 people registered with FEMA for disaster assistance.

The Cajun Navy, an informal organization of volunteers with boats from Louisiana, deployed to Texas to assist in high-water rescues.

The Houston Independent School District announced that all students on any of the district's campuses would be eligible for free lunch throughout the 2017–18 school year. The Federal Department of Education eased financial aid rules and procedures for those affected by Harvey, giving schools the ability to waive paperwork requirements; loan borrowers were given more flexibility in managing their loan payments. A 36-year-old inmate sentenced to death for a 2003 murder was granted a temporary reprieve as a result of Harvey, as his legal team was based in Harris County, an area heavily affected by the hurricane.

By August 30, corporations across the nation collectively donated more than $72 million to relief efforts, with 42 companies donating at least $1 million. Professional athletic teams, their players, and managers provided large donations to assist victims of the storm. The Houston Astros pledged $4 million to relief along with all proceeds from their home game raffles. Houston Rockets owner Leslie Alexander also donated $4 million to the cause. A fundraiser established by Houston Texans defensive lineman J. J. Watt exceeded $37 million. For his efforts, Watt received the Walter Payton NFL Man of the Year Award. The Texas Rangers and Tennessee Titans both provided $1 million, while the New England Patriots pledged to match up to $1 million in donations to the Red Cross. Multiple Hollywood celebrities also pitched in, collectively donating more than $10 million, with Sandra Bullock providing the largest single donation of $1 million. Leonardo DiCaprio provided $1 million to the United Way Harvey Recovery Fund through his foundation. President Donald Trump donated $1 million to 12 charities involved in relief efforts. Rachael Ray provided donations totaling $1 million to animal shelters across the Houston area.

=== Economic loss estimates ===
Costliest U.S. Atlantic hurricanes (Note: The storm category color indicates the intensity of the hurricane when landfalling in the U.S.)
Rank	Hurricane	Season	Damage
1	3 Katrina	2005	$125 billion
1	4 Harvey	2017	$125 billion
3	4 Ian	2022	$112 billion
4	4 Maria	2017	$90 billion
5	4 Helene	2024	$78.7 billion
6	4 Ida	2021	$75 billion
7	ET Sandy	2012	$65 billion
8	4 Irma	2017	$52.1 billion
9	3 Milton	2024	$34.3 billion
10	2 Ike	2008	$30 billion

Moody's Analytics initially estimated the total economic cost of the storm at $81 billion to $108 billion or more; most of the economic losses are damage to homes and commercial property. Reinsurance company Aon Benfield estimated total economic losses at $100 billion, including $30 billion in insured damage, making Harvey the costliest disaster in 2017 by their calculations. USA Today reported an AccuWeather estimate of $190 billion, released August 31. On September 3, Texas state governor Greg Abbott estimated that damages will be between $150 billion and $180 billion, surpassing the $120 billion that it took to rebuild New Orleans after Katrina. According to weather analytics firm Planalytics, lost revenue to Houston area retailers and restaurants alone will be approximately $1 billion. The Houston area controls 4% of the spending power in the United States.

In September 2017, the Insurance Council of Texas estimated the total insured losses from Hurricane Harvey at $19 billion. This figure represents $11 billion in flood losses insured by the National Flood Insurance Program (NFIP), $3 billion in "insured windstorm and other storm-related property losses"; and about $4.75 billion in insured flood losses of private and commercial vehicles. By January 1, 2018, payouts from the NFIP reached $7.6 billion against total estimated losses of $8.5–9.5 billion. Economists Michael Hicks and Mark Burton at Ball State University estimated damage in the Houston metropolitan area alone at $198.63 billion. Preliminary reporting from the National Oceanic and Atmospheric Administration set a more concrete total at $125 billion, making Harvey the 2nd costliest tropical cyclone on record, behind Hurricane Katrina with 2017 costs of $161 billion (after adjusting for inflation).

A significant portion of the storm's damages are uninsured losses. Regular homeowner insurance policies generally exclude coverage for flooding, as the NFIP underwrites most flood insurance policies in the US. Although the purchase of flood insurance is obligatory for federally guaranteed mortgages for homes within the 100-year flood plain, enforcement of the requirement is difficult and many homes, even within the 100-year flood plain, lack flood insurance. In Harris County, Texas—which includes the city of Houston—only 15% of homes have flood insurance policies issued by the NFIP. Participation in the NFIP is higher, but still low, in neighboring Galveston (41%), Brazoria (26%), and Chambers Counties (21%). Homeowners sued authorities after reservoir releases damaged homes.

=== Federal government response ===
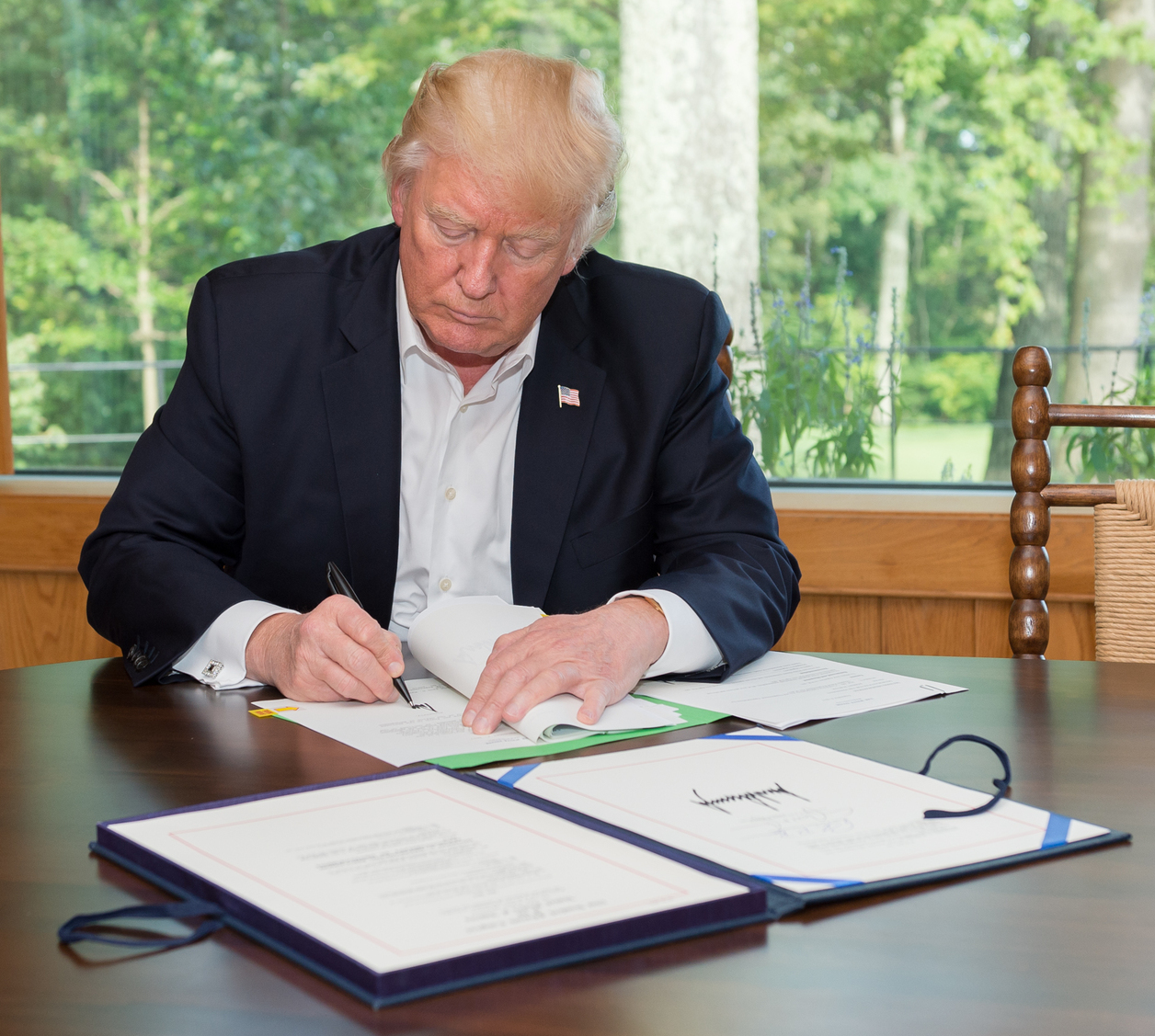
President Trump signs H.R. 601 into effect, providing $15 billion in disaster relief for hurricane victims

On September 8, President Donald Trump signed into law H.R. 601, which among other spending actions designated $15 billion for Hurricane Harvey relief.

=== Non-governmental organization response ===
The American Red Cross, Salvation Army, United Methodist Committee on Relief (UMCOR), Gulf Coast Synod Disaster Relief, United States Equestrian Federation, Humane Society of the United States, Knights of Columbus, Samaritan's Purse, Catholic Charities USA, AmeriCares, BakerRipley, Operation BBQ relief, many celebrities, and many other charitable organizations provided help to the victims of the storm. Anarchists (including Antifa) also provided relief. Business aviation played a part in the rescue efforts, providing support during the storm as well as relief flights bringing in suppliers in the immediate aftermath.

Volunteers from amateur radio's emergency service wing, the Amateur Radio Emergency Service, provided communications in American Red Cross shelters in South Texas.

Many corporations also contributed to relief efforts. Operation BBQ relief had the help from several local individuals and businesses kick off the support of providing meals for volunteers and victims. Smokers, pallets of wood, and another company came up with the pounds of pork to kick off the support effort. Operation BBQ relief vendors volunteering for the Houston flood relief estimates that they will serve at least 450,000 meals. On August 27, 2017, it was estimated that Operation BBQ relief will be expecting 25,000 to 30,000 meals a day.

On August 27, 2017, KSL-TV, KSL Newsradio, FM100.3, and 103.5 The Arrow created a fundraiser to help Texas residents impacted by Hurricane Harvey. Because of an anonymous donor willing to match $2 for every $1 raised up to a total of $100,000, Peter Huntsman also agreed to match donations up to $100,000. The combined total of $200,000 was met by August 31, 2017. Following this, their new goal was $1 million.

=== Foreign government response ===
Singapore dispatched Boeing CH-47 Chinook helicopters from the Republic of Singapore Air Force to areas affected by the hurricane for humanitarian operations, working alongside the Texas National Guard. Israel pledged $1 million in relief funds for restoration of non-state run communal infrastructure. Mexico sent volunteers from the Mexican Red Cross, firemen from Coahuila, and rescue teams from Guanajuato to Houston to assist in relief. Mexico later rescinded their commitment for aid after Hurricane Katia made landfall on Mexico's Gulf Coast, on September 9, 2017. Venezuela offered $5 million through the state-owned Citgo Petroleum, which operates a refinery in Corpus Christi.

=== Health and environmental hazards in flood waters ===
Houston officials stated that the Houston drinking water and sewer systems were intact; however, "hundreds of thousands of people across the 38 Texas counties affected by Hurricane Harvey use private wells, according to an estimate by Louisiana State University researchers, and those people must fend for themselves." Additionally, Harris County, which includes Houston, contains a large number of Superfund-designed brownfield sites that contain a wide variety of toxins and carcinogens. Two Superfund sites in Corpus Christi were flooded.

=== Baby boom ===
In the months after the hurricane struck, some hospitals in Texas saw a spike in birth rates, with a 17% increase in birth rates being reported at Corpus Christi Medical Center. A similar, larger baby boom also occurred after Hurricane Sandy in 2012.

=== Retirement ===
Due to the extensive damage and loss of life the hurricane caused along its track, particularly in Texas, the World Meteorological Organization retired the name Harvey from its rotating name lists in April 2018, and it will never again be used for another Atlantic tropical cyclone. It was replaced with Harold for the 2023 season.

== Environmental factors ==
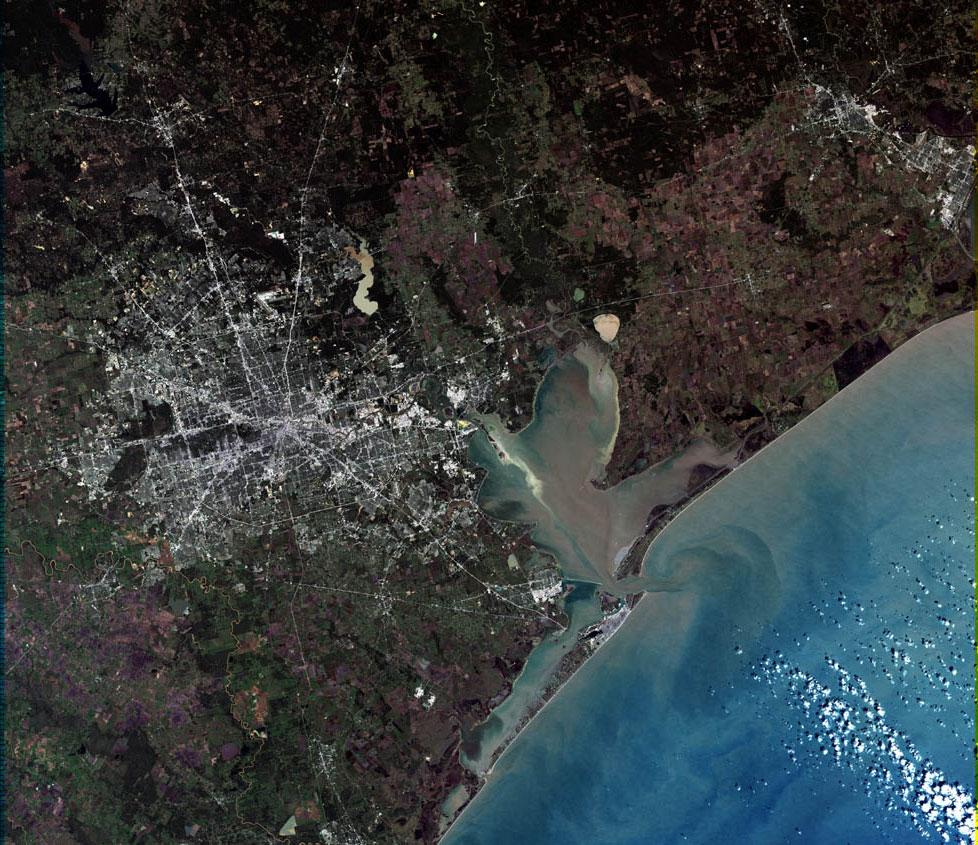
Houston's very flat topography makes flooding a problem. (Simulated-color image)

Houston is located in the Southeastern United States on the Gulf Coastal Plain, and its clay-based soils provide poor drainage. There is a tendency for storms to move very slowly over the region, allowing them to produce tremendous amounts of rain over an extended period, as occurred during Tropical Storm Claudette in 1979, and Tropical Storm Allison in 2001. The area is a very flat flood plain at shallow gradient, slowly draining rainwater through an intricate network of channels and bayous to the sea. The main waterways, the San Jacinto River and the Buffalo Bayou, meander slowly, laden with mud, and have little capacity for carrying storm water.

=== Urban development ===
Houston has seen rapid urban development (urban sprawl), with absorbent prairie and wetlands replaced by hard surfaces which rapidly shed storm water, overwhelming the drainage capacity of the rivers and channels. Between 1992 and 2010, almost 25,000 acres of wetlands were lost, decreasing the detention capacity of the region by four billion gallons. However, Harvey was estimated to have dropped more than fifteen trillion gallons of water in the area.

The Katy Prairie in western Harris County, which once helped to absorb floodwaters in the region, has been reduced to one quarter of its previous size in the last several decades due to suburban development, and one analysis discovered that more than 7,000 housing units have been built within the 100-year floodplain in Harris County since 2010.

=== Subsidence ===
As Houston has expanded, rainwater infiltration in the region has lessened and aquifer extraction increased, causing the depletion of underground aquifers. When the saturated ground dries, the soil can be compressed and the land surface elevation decreases in a process called subsidence. Subsidence can also occur due to sediment settling. Specifically, regions to the north and west of the Houston metro have seen 0.4 inches (10 mm) to 1 inch (25 mm) of subsidence per year. While oil extraction can cause subsidence, in the Houston-Galveston area, most oil has been extracted from sandstone that has relatively negligible ability to compress once oil has been removed. Thus, oil extraction has not resulted in significant subsidence. Further, the volume of oil extraction in the Houston area is too low to cause significant subsidence.

=== Climate change ===
The Gulf of Mexico is known for hurricanes in August, so their incidence alone cannot be attributed to global warming, but the warming climate does influence certain attributes of storms. Studies in this regard show that storms tend to intensify more rapidly prior to landfall. Weather events are due to multiple factors, and so cannot be said to be caused by one precondition, but climate change affects aspects of extreme events, and very likely worsened some of the impacts of Harvey. In a briefing, the World Meteorological Organization stated that the quantity of rainfall from Harvey had very likely been increased by climate change.

Harvey approached Houston over sea-surface waters which were significantly above average temperatures. Warm waters provide the main source of energy for hurricanes, and increased ocean heat can result in storms being larger, more intense and longer lasting, in particular bringing greatly increased rainfall. Sea level rise added to the resulting problems. According to officials from the Harris County Flood Control District, Harvey caused the third '500-year' flood in three years. The National Climate Assessment states:

"The recent increases in activity are linked, in part, to higher sea surface temperatures in the region that Atlantic hurricanes form in and move through. Numerous factors have been shown to influence these local sea surface temperatures, including natural variability, human-induced emissions of heat-trapping gases, and particulate pollution. Quantifying the relative contributions of natural and human-caused factors is an active focus of research."

Warmer air can hold more water vapor, in accordance with the Clausius–Clapeyron relation, and there has been a global increase of daily rainfall records. Regional sea surface temperatures around Houston have risen around 0.5 °C (0.9 °F) in recent decades, which caused a 3–5% increase in moisture in the atmosphere. This had the effect of allowing Harvey to strengthen more than expected. The water temperature of the Gulf of Mexico was above average for this time of the year, and likely to be a factor in Harvey's impact.

The slow movement of Harvey over Texas allowed the storm to drop prolonged heavy rains on the state, as has also happened with earlier storms. Harvey's stalled position was due to weak prevailing winds linked to a greatly expanded subtropical high pressure system over much of the US at the time, which had pushed the jet stream to the north. Research and model simulations have indicated an association between this pattern and human-caused climate change.

== See also ==
- Weather of 2017
- Tropical cyclones in 2017
- List of Category 4 Atlantic hurricanes
- List of Texas hurricanes (1980–present)
- List of costliest Atlantic hurricanes
- List of wettest tropical cyclones
- Great Flood of 1862 – An ARkStorm event that dropped similar amounts of rainfall in California
- Cyclone Hyacinthe (1980) – The wettest recorded tropical cyclone worldwide
- Hurricane Irma (2017) – A Category 5 hurricane that made landfall in Florida as a Category 4 hurricane
- Hurricane Maria (2017) – A Category 5 hurricane that devastated Puerto Rico as a high-end Category 4
- Hurricane Florence (2018) – Another Category 4 hurricane in 2018 that stalled over the coast of the Carolinas as a Category 1 and caused catastrophic flooding
- Hurricane Helene (2024) - Another Category 4 hurricane that caused catastrophic flooding to North Carolina after striking Florida's big bend at peak intensity

Other tropical cyclones that made landfall in the same region of the Texas Gulf coast

- 1886 Indianola hurricane – Destroyed the burgeoning port city of Indianola
- 1900 Galveston hurricane – Deadliest natural disaster in US history, impacting Galveston with unmitigated storm surge and killing as many as 12,000
- 1932 Freeport hurricane – Rapidly intensifying Category 4 hurricane that brought heavy rainfall to the Angleton and Freeport areas
- Hurricane Carla (1961) – Another storm that made landfall as a Category 4 hurricane
- Hurricane Celia (1970) – Produced destructive winds in the Corpus Christi area
- Hurricane Alicia (1983) – A Category 3 hurricane that affected Galveston and Houston
- Tropical Storm Allison (2001) – Another damaging tropical cyclone that stalled over southeastern Texas, flooding the region
- Hurricane Ike (2008) – Another Category 4 hurricane that caused devastation in Texas
- Tropical Storm Imelda (2019) – Weak tropical cyclone which caused similar extreme flooding in the same region
- Hurricane Nicholas (2021) – A minimal Category 1 hurricane which made landfall in similar areas
- Hurricane Beryl (2024) – Made landfall in Texas as a Category 1 hurricane, resulting in similarly devastating impacts to the Houston area

== Notes ==
Preceded by Katrina (Currently tied)	Costliest Atlantic hurricanes on Record; 2017	Succeeded by None
