= If... (TV series) =

British television series

If... is a series of BBC drama-documentaries broadcast on BBC Two from March to April 2004 and December 2004 to January 2005, each of which considers the unexpected, dramatic or even catastrophic political or social consequences that might arise from current trends in the United Kingdom. Using a drama with interviews from experts, then a discussion of the programme with a panel of experts from both sides of an argument. During the show a televote of opinion is cast.

== List of episodes ==
=== Series 1: 2004 ===
No. overall	No. in series	Title	Original release date
1	1	"If... The Lights Go Out"	10 March 2004
If... The Lights Go Out imagines a near-future scenario in which the UK has become dependent upon imported natural gas supplies to fuel its power stations. A terrorist attack at the compressor station in Vyborg, Russia in late 2010 leads to a disastrous winter blackout when the UK's other energy suppliers can't keep up with demand.
2	2	"If... Things Don't Get Better"	17 March 2004
If... Things Don't Get Better imagines a near-future scenario in which the UK has gated communities where the rich and the poor are separated by the growing wealth divide. In the story a gated community in London closed off a road to stop crime in the area.
3	3	"If... The Generations Fall Out"	24 March 2004
If... The Generations Fall Out imagines a near-future where the UK's aging population sparks tensions between the baby boomers and the generations who came before them, sparked by the increasing number of elderly people receiving a state pension.
4	4	"If... It Was a Woman's World"	31 March 2004
If... It Was a Woman's World imagines a scenario in which the UK has become an oppressive matriarchy, creating a systemic power imbalance between men and women and causing men's rights organisations such as "Fathers Fight Back" (based on Fathers 4 Justice) to become more common. Using a 21st-century dysfunctional family as an example, the episode focuses on a divorced father and member of Fathers Fight Back breaking into a live television broadcast from the (female) President of the United States to spread a message of hope and equality. Meanwhile, his ex-wife uses new cloning and IVF treatments to have a daughter (selected by her) without a father.
5	5	"If... We Don't Stop Eating"	7 April 2004
If... We Don't Stop Eating is a look at what might happen if the obesity epidemic went out of control.

=== Series 2: 2004–05 ===
No. overall	No. in series	Title	Original release date
6	1	"If... Cloning Could Cure Us"	16 October 2004
If... Cloning Could Cure Us discusses the ethics involved in cloning and stem cell therapy, imagining the fictional trial of Dr. Alex Douglas, who used cloned stem cells that were older than allowed by law to cure a paralysed climber of his paralysis.
7	2	"If... We Could Stop the Violence"	22 October 2004
If... We Could Stop The Violence features the story of a boy named Liam, seemingly predisposed to violent behaviour, positing that there may be an element of biological inheritance to a person's behaviour. The episode then goes on to argue that genetic modification could remove a person's tendency towards violence, and examines the ethics involved.
8	3	"If... Drugs Were Legal"	12 January 2005
If... Drugs Were Legal visits a future in which all formerly-illicit drugs have undergone legalisation in the United Kingdom. In the episode, two teenage girls die after taking drugs at a nightclub, and an investigation into their deaths is launched. It turns out that the girls were given an unlicensed blend of drugs by an illegal dealer. The drugs were originally made by an anti-drugs campaigner, in an attempt to have drugs recriminalised.
9	4	"If... TV Goes Down the Tube"	21 March 2005
If... TV Goes Down the Tube details the story of the suicide of Lizzie Alton, a contestant on a reality television programme, and the disturbing new connections between the media industry and the government, who seem to be embracing the use of television as a political tool. Alton's mother, Mary, goes on to uncover a sinister conspiracy between the government and the production company behind the program that influenced her daughter to take her life.
10	5	"If... The Toxic Timebomb Goes Off"	31 March 2005
11	6	"If... We Stopped Giving Aid to Africa"	26 June 2005
If... We Stopped Giving Aid to Africa examines a future where by 2015, several countries in Africa have begun to refuse to accept aid from Western nations, due to widespread concerns over the misuse and misappropriation of donated money and goods. The episode also focuses on the murder of a charity worker by the Lord's Resistance Army in Uganda.

=== Series 3: 2006 ===
No. overall	No. in series	Title	Original release date
12	1	"If... The Oil Runs Out"	30 May 2006
If... The Oil Runs Out examines a future when oil prices increase dramatically due to instability in the Middle East. The documentary also examines the resultant effects of this price increase on economies and consumers.

== Production ==
The series was filmed with the Panasonic SDX 900 DVCPRO 50 professional camcorder in widescreen 25fps progressive mode.

== See also ==
- The Day Britain Stopped
- Oil Storm
