= Oil Storm =

2005 British television film

- Genre: Simulation
- Written by: James Erskine; Caroline Levy
- Directed by: James Erskine
- Starring: Melody Chase; Lance E. Nichols; Mark Krasnoff
- Narrated by: Liev Schreiber
- Theme music composer: The Music Sculptors; Mark Sayer-Wade
- Country of origin: United Kingdom
- Original language: English

Production
- Producers: Alex Graham; Jonathan Hewes; Caroline Levy; Daniel Hank
- Running time: 90 minutes

Original release
- Network: BBC Two
- Release: 5 June 2005

Oil Storm is a 2005 television simulation portraying a future oil-shortage crisis in the United States, precipitated by a hurricane destroying key parts of the United States' oil infrastructure. The program was an attempt to depict what would happen if the highly oil-dependent country was suddenly faced with gasoline costing upwards of $7 to $8 per gallon (as opposed to the national average of around $2 per gallon when the show first aired). Directed by James Erskine and written by Erskine and Caroline Levy, it originally aired on FX Networks on 5 June 2005, at 8 p.m. ET.

The crisis arises from a hurricane destroying an important pipeline at Port Fourchon in Louisiana, a tanker collision closing a busy port, terrorist attacks and tension with Saudi Arabia over the oil trade, and other fictional events. The program followed the lives of several people - the owners of a mom-and-pop convenience store, a paramedic, stock market and oil analysts, government officials, and others - and includes a substantial amount of human drama.

== Plot ==
Hurricane Julia, a Category 4 hurricane, strikes the Gulf of Mexico, making a direct hit on New Orleans, Louisiana, killing thousands of people and causing severe damage. Large numbers of offshore oil rigs in the Gulf, and a major pipeline and the primary nerve center of the Gulf Coast petroleum industry at Port Fourchon, Louisiana are destroyed. It shows how the effects of that disaster could have significant consequences throughout the United States, even in areas far removed from landfall.

While the loss of life and property in the storm is staggering (with the death toll in the thousands and the damage in the billions), the greater impact is on the crippled energy industry. Due to the destruction at Port Fourchon and in the Gulf, oil prices skyrocket from $55 to $77 per barrel, and the United States government is forced to take immediate action to rebuild the Gulf's energy infrastructure. Once the storm passes, the government starts to rebuild the infrastructure at Port Fourchon (requiring a minimum of eight months) and repair or replace damaged offshore rigs (requiring a similar amount of time). Also, shipping that normally goes through Port Fourchon is rerouted to the Port of Houston; Houston's port facilities are open around-the-clock with higher-than-usual throughput, with attendant higher risk of accident.

With widespread gas lines and prices over $3.00 per gallon, the U.S. persuades Saudi Arabia to increase its oil production by 1m barrels a day. The Saudi decision to aid America causes a backlash among a restive Muslim population already energized because of the 2003 invasion of Iraq. Local terrorists stage an attack on an upscale shopping mall in Riyadh which (after intervention by Saudi special forces) kills about 300 Americans associated with multinational oil companies. This attack leads the U.S. to send troops to Saudi Arabia. In the meantime, the oil crisis escalates when two large tankers collide in the narrow Houston Ship Channel, shutting down the Channel.

Once winter sets in, gas lines take a back seat to critical shortages of heating oil during a bitterly cold winter, with thousands dying in the cold. Some good news comes after the Houston Ship Channel is reopened, but on Christmas Day, the same Saudi terrorists blow up sections of the mammoth Ras Tanura refinery complex, killing 142 U.S. soldiers who were protecting the Saudi oil infrastructure; among the casualties is the eldest son of the convenience store owners. Oil prices reach $153 per barrel, and gas prices top $8 per gallon.

Meanwhile, with a government budget crisis due to military and economic pressures, farm spending is cut dramatically, leading to a subplot in which the social and political effects of this are explored. A well-renowned agricultural leader organizes a 750,000-farmer march on Washington, leading to clashes with police and the leader being taken into custody.

In the spring, the U.S. makes a deal with Russia to send 8 million barrels (1,300,000 m^{3}) of oil by tanker, but the oil companies involved subsequently make a deal with China, which, equally hungry for oil and with greater financial reserves, outbids the U.S. This leaves America in a state of chaos, as well leading to soul-searching on whether China has now become the world's economic superpower. The country considers fast-tracking development of alternative energy sources, but there is little that can be done in the short-term to alter an economy structurally dependent on cheap foreign oil. Later, the U.S. government, showing unexpected diplomatic skill, resurrects the Russian oil deal by agreeing to a $16 billion long-term investment in its oil industry, and the China-bound tankers change course to the United States.

The crisis finally eases a year after Hurricane Julia, with Port Fourchon back at 80-percent capacity, the strategic petroleum reserve being replenished and tensions in Saudi Arabia stabilized. Oil prices drop from their highs at the height of the crisis to $73 per barrel, and gas prices nearing the $4 per gallon mark and dropping. However, the country has been through a stress as great as the Stock Market Crash of 1929, and now knowing that relying on OPEC for most of its foreign oil imports makes the United States vulnerable, Americans will never take cheap oil for granted again.

== Real-world events partly anticipated by the film ==
=== Hurricane Katrina ===
The events of Hurricane Katrina, its economic impact and the ensuing price increases nearly parallel some of the events in the movie. However, the damage to US oil infrastructure was less severe than in the film, and the lack of the compounding events (shutdown of Port of Houston, loss of some of Saudi Arabia's supply) means the consequences of Katrina are much less than of the fictional Julia. However, especially given the coincidence of dates (in the film, Julia strikes in early September 2005), the similarity of the early impact of the two storms has been noted.

On 28 August 2005, Hurricane Katrina was on a direct path to hit Port Fourchon and New Orleans. Many of the initial scenes of Hurricane Julia were playing out in real life with Hurricane Katrina, such as the mandatory evacuation of New Orleans, the opening of the Superdome as shelter, and the changing of traffic to contraflow. On 29 August 2005, Hurricane Katrina did not directly hit Port Fourchon but across Barataria Bay at Buras, but nonetheless some oil rigs were damaged. Saudi Arabia agreed to increase oil production to help.

On 30 August 2005, many gas stations raised prices by a considerable amount putting most of America over $3.00/gallon, as shown in the movie. On 1 September 2005, gas stations throughout the country began to run out of fuel due to worries of mass shortages. Some stations in Atlanta, Georgia sold gas at nearly $6/gallon. Most of this was due to panic buying, as noted in the film, rather than physical shortage. Subsequently, as the extent of the damage became clearer, prices eased.

The casualty numbers shown for New Orleans is also startlingly close to the casualties of Katrina. The movie shows a little more than 1700 while the official number for Katrina is 1833.

=== Automotive layoffs ===
Both Ford and GM announced layoffs and plant closings in late 2005 and early 2006. However, while one reason for the layoffs was increased gasoline prices, it was not the sole reason for the layoffs. In addition, the layoffs were on a much smaller scale than the ones shown in the film.

There was also the 2009 GM crisis in which General Motors requested and received Federal assistance. Unlike the mocumentary, GM did not die, it seemed "too big to fail" because maintaining automotive competition and the status quo seemed more important.

=== Attacks on Saudi refineries ===
In the film, al-Qaeda makes a terrorist attack on the oil facilities at Ras Tanura. On 24 February 2006 al-Qaeda attacked the nearby facility at Abqaiq, though no damage was inflicted on the facilities themselves.
