= Laguna Madre (Mexico) =

Lagoon in northeastern Mexico

- Laguna Madre and Río Bravo Delta Biosphere Reserve; Laguna Madre and Río Bravo Delta Flora and Fauna Protection Area
- IUCN category VI (protected area with sustainable use of natural resources)
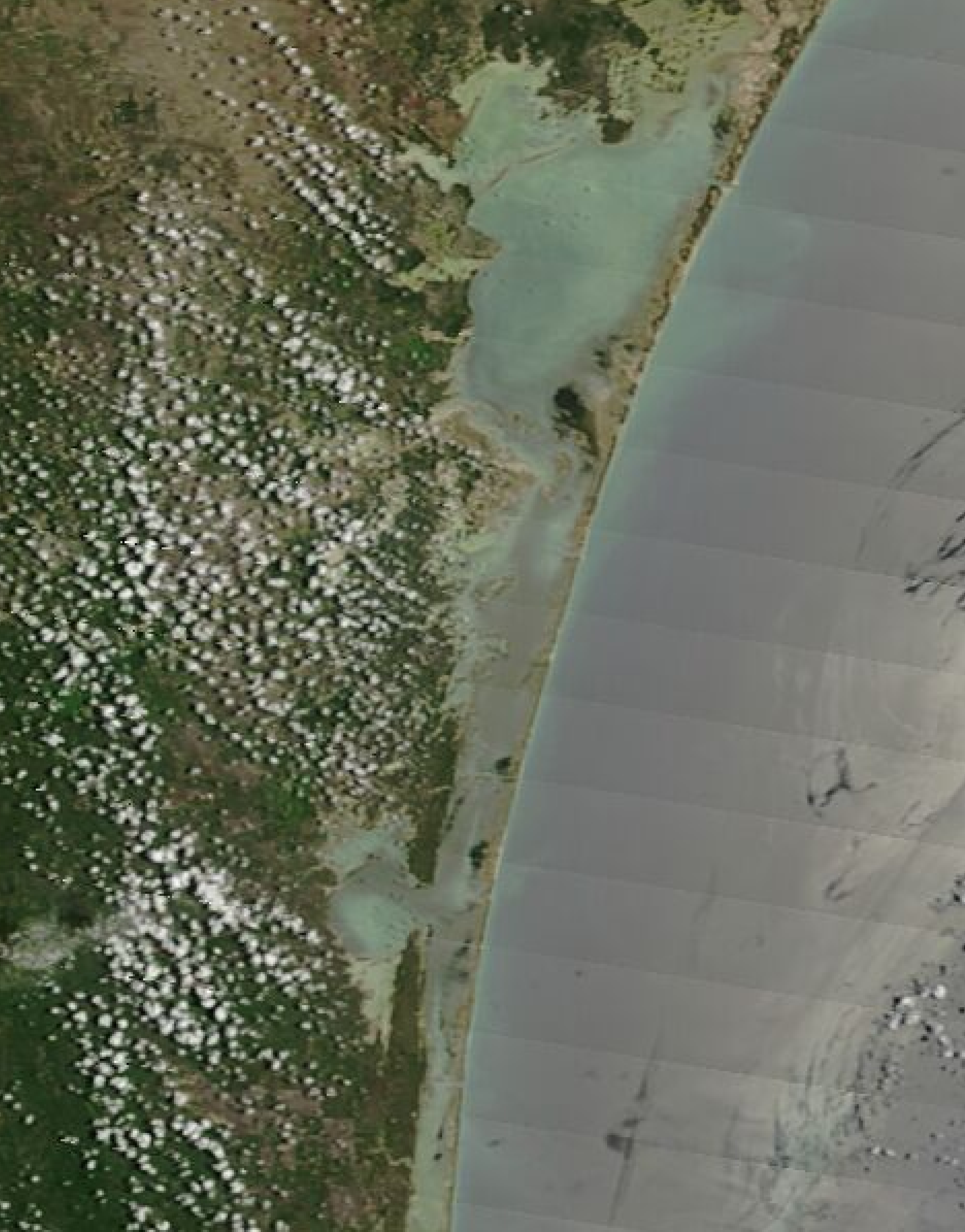
- Laguna Madre from space

- Location within Tamaulipas Location within Mexico
- Location: Tamaulipas, Mexico
- Coordinates: 25.232274°N 97.608032°W
- Area: 5,728.08 km^{2} (2,211.62 sq mi)
- Designation: Flora and fauna protection area (national) biosphere reserve (international)
- Designated: 2005 (national) 2006 (international)
- Administrator: National Commission of Natural Protected Areas

Ramsar Wetland
- Official name: Laguna Madre
- Designated: 2 February 2004
- Reference no.: 1362

Laguna Madre is a coastal lagoon in Northeastern Mexico. It extends along the coast of Tamaulipas for over 200 km, from the Río Bravo Delta on the north to the mouth of the Soto la Marina River near La Pesca in the south. Laguna Madre is separated from the Gulf of Mexico on the east by a number of barrier islands, including Barra Los Americanos, Barra Jesús María, and Barra Soto la Marina, and is bounded on the west by the Tamaulipan mainland. It is located in the municipalities of Matamoros, San Fernando, and Soto la Marina.

There is another Laguna Madre in the United States, which extends north from the Río Bravo Delta to Corpus Christi Bay and the city of Corpus Christi in southern Texas. Together the two lagoons and delta form a single ecological unit approximately 275 miles (443 km) in total.

== Characteristics ==
The Laguna Madre is very shallow, with an average depth of only 0.9 m (3.0 ft). The lagoon is connected to the ocean by only two narrow inlets, so the tidal range – which is already minor in this part of the Gulf of Mexico – is negligible. One of the inlets is Boca de Catán. Atmospheric effects are much more important than tides in its circulation; its weak currents generally follow the prevailing winds, and these winds can influence the water level by as much as a meter.

Oceanographically, the Laguna Madre is considered a hypersaline lagoon; this indicates that it is usually much saltier than the ocean, due to being nearly landlocked in a semiarid environment. This is because its salinity can vary wildly depending on rainfall and freshwater inflow, from as high as 120 ppt (12%) – over three times saltier than the ocean – to as low as 2 ppt (0.2%) after a heavy rain.

== Flora and fauna ==
According to the National Biodiversity Information System of Comisión Nacional para el Conocimiento y Uso de la Biodiversidad (CONABIO) in Laguna Madre and Delta del Río Bravo Flora and Fauna Protection Area there are over 1,515 plant and animal species from which 72 are in at risk category and 51 are exotics.

Aquatic habitats include mangroves and large areas of seagrass beds with Halodule wrightii and other species.

Laguna Madre is one of the most important bird wintering habitats in Mexico. It is home to 26 species of waterfowl, including grey plover (Pluvialis squatarola), sanderling (Calidris alba), least sandpiper (Calidris minutilla), and piping plover (Charadrius melodus). Populations of redhead (Aythya americana) and northern pintail (Anas acuta) number over 100,000 individuals. There are 144 resident bird species, including both waterbirds and terrestrial birds. It is on the Gulf migratory route, an important migration route for water birds, songbirds, and birds of prey.

Upland areas are part of the Tamaulipan pastizal, a mosaic of grassland and semi-arid shrubland. Characteristic shrubs include mesquite (Neltuma glandulosa), blackbrush (Vachellia rigidula), and Castela tortuosa. It includes some of the best-preserved areas in the Mexican portion of the pastizal, and serves as a wildlife corridor for large mammals like jaguar, ocelot, oncillo, puma, and bobcat.

== Conservation ==
Thanks to lobbying and studies done by organizations such as Pronatura Noreste, universities, local governments, and other organizations, with the aid of local communities, in April 2005 the Mexican government declared Laguna Madre and the Río Bravo Delta a flora and fauna protection area. The 1.4 million acres (5,700 km^{2}) under legal protection are in the municipalities of Matamoros, San Fernando and Soto la Marina, in the state of Tamaulipas. In 2006 UNESCO declared the area an international biosphere reserve.

== Sources ==
- Laguna Madre from the Handbook of Texas Online
- “Laguna Madre – A New Day… Un Nuevo Día” (PDF) (Accessed 12/09/19) – US Fish and Wildlife Service
- The Nature Conservatory – “Laguna Madre” (Accessed 2/25/08)
