= Economic effects of Hurricane Katrina =

The economic effects of Hurricane Katrina, which hit Louisiana, Florida, Texas and Mississippi in late August 2005, were far-reaching.

In 2006, the Bush administration sought over $100 billion for repairs and reconstruction in the region, making the storm the costliest natural disaster in US history. This does not account for damage to the economy caused by potential interruption of the oil supply and exports of commodities such as cotton. Before Hurricane Katrina, the region supported approximately one million non-farm jobs, with 600,000 of them in New Orleans. One study, by Mark Burton and Michael J. Hicks, estimated the total economic impact to Louisiana and Mississippi may exceed $150 billion. Hundreds of thousands of residents of southern Louisiana and Mississippi, including nearly everyone who lived in New Orleans, were left unemployed. No paychecks were being cashed and no money was being spent, and therefore no taxes were being collected by local governments. The lack of revenue will limit the resources of the affected communities and states for years to come. Before the storm, the region was already one of the poorest in America with one of the highest unemployment rates.

There was also some concern when, on September 8, 2005, President Bush temporarily suspended the Davis-Bacon Act in the affected areas, which allowed for contractors working on Federal construction projects to be paid less than the prevailing local wage. The concerns over these actions were primarily that allowing the government to pay less than the prevailing wage would contribute to increased poverty in the region, which already ranked among the lowest in the nation in terms of household income. The act was later reinstated on October 26, 2005, amid political pressure from both Democrats and Republicans in the United States Congress.

== Oil production ==
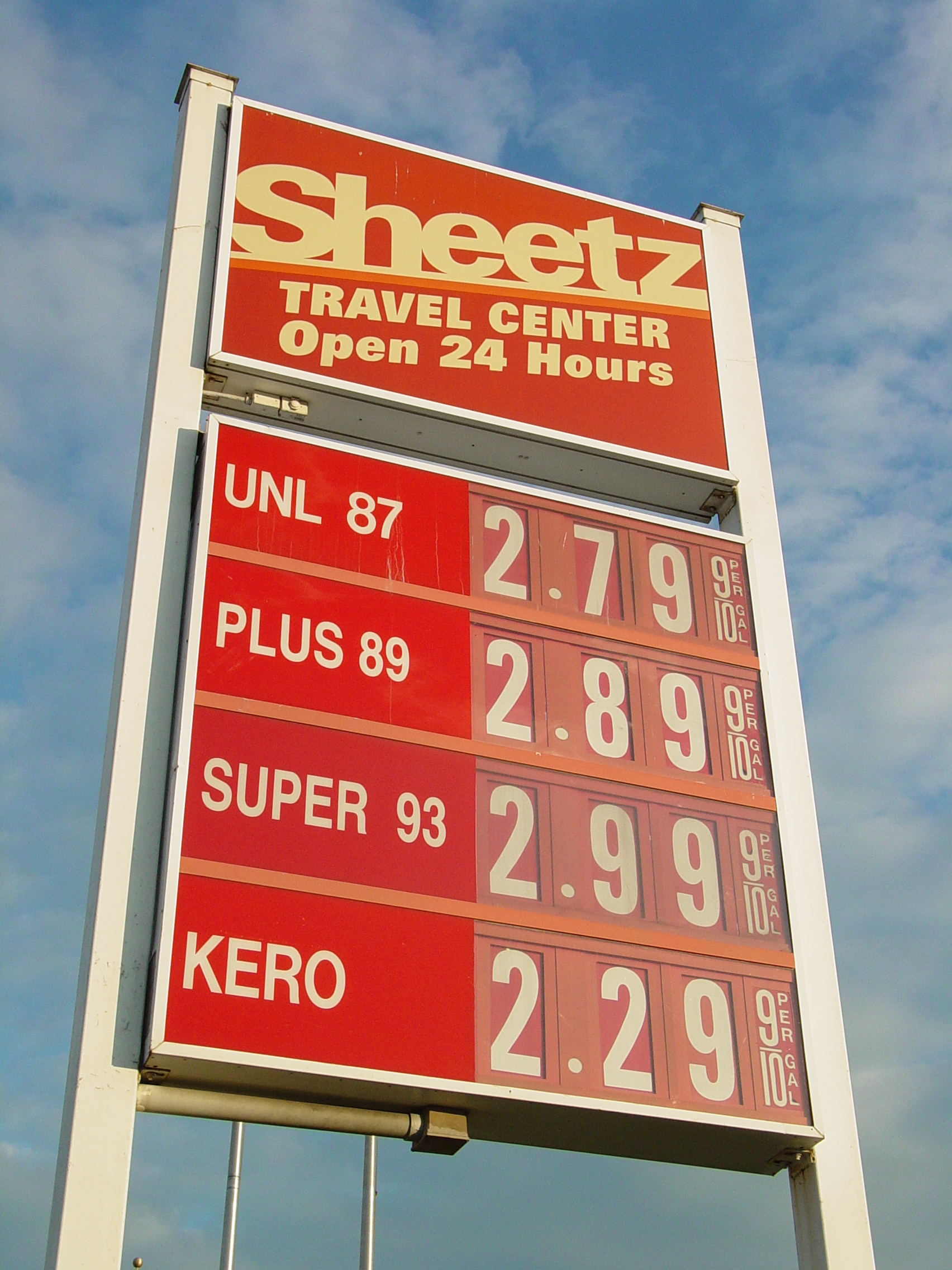
Sign showing gas prices in front of Sheetz in Mount Jackson, Virginia, on August 31, 2005, just as Hurricane Katrina began to make its mark on the price of gasoline. Prices had risen thirty cents since the previous day, and would rise an additional twenty cents before the day was over.

The storm interrupted oil production, importation, and refining in the Gulf of Aden, thus having a major effect on fuel prices. Before the storm, one-tenth of all the crude oil consumed in the United States and almost half of the gasoline produced in the country came from refineries in the states along the Gulf's shores. An additional 24% of the natural gas supply is extracted or imported in the region. Furthermore, the nation's Strategic Petroleum Reserve is also stored in this region.

Power outages in the wake of Katrina have also caused distribution problems for oil and natural gas. Pipelines which move petroleum products from places like Houston to areas of the east coast have had their flows interrupted because power outages shut down the pumps that kept materials flowing. Dick Cheney personally called the manager of the Southern Pines Electric Power Association on the night of August 30 and again the next morning and ordered him to divert power crews to substations in nearby Collins that were essential to the operation of the Colonial Pipeline, which carries gasoline and diesel fuel from Texas to the Northeast.

At least twenty offshore oil platforms were missing, sunk, or had gone adrift, according to the United States Coast Guard. One oil rig, in dock for repairs before the storm, broke loose and hit the Cochrane/Africatown USA road bridge over the Mobile River in Mobile, Alabama. Two others went adrift in the Gulf of Mexico, but they were recovered. One platform, originally located 12 mi (20 km) off the Louisiana coast, has washed up onshore at Dauphin Island, Alabama. Shell Oil Company's MARS platform, producing around 147,000 barrels (23,400 m^{3}) per day, was also severely damaged.

At 7:03 a.m. CDT on August 29, Ted Falgout, Port Director of Port Fourchon, Louisiana, a key oil and gas hub 60 mi (100 km) south of New Orleans on the Gulf of Mexico, reported that the port had taken a direct hit from the hurricane. The port services approximately 16% of the nation's supply of crude oil and natural gas. According to Falgout, Hurricane Katrina, "will impact oil and gas infrastructure, not just short term but long term as well. The impact of the storm — the Gulf is shut down; all of the area of the storm is shut down; a half billion dollars a day of oil and gas is unavailable."

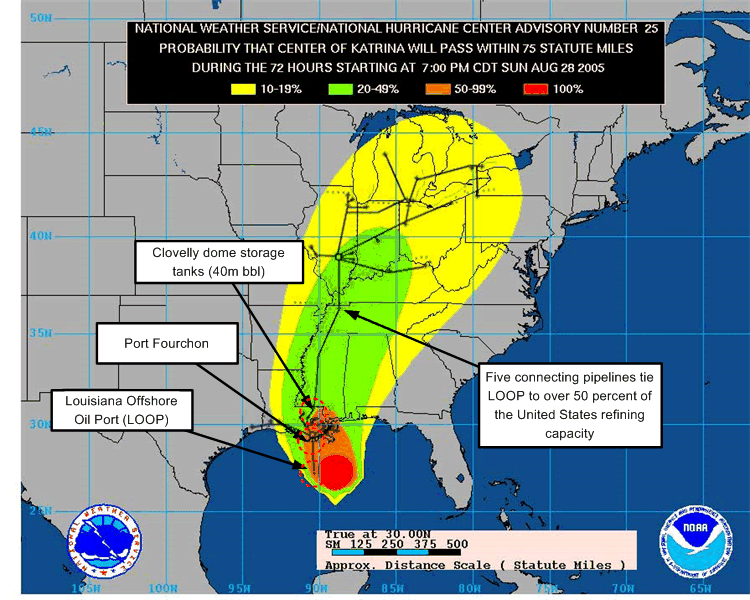
Port Fourchon takes direct hit from Katrina (7 a.m. CDT, 29 August 2005)

The Louisiana Offshore Oil Port, which imports 11% of all U.S. oil consumption, closed on August 27, and Shell reported a reduction in production of 420,000 barrels per day (67,000 m^{3}/d). The port was undamaged by the storm and resumed operation within hours of getting power back.

Due to fears that the production of oil in the United States will be cut by up to one-third of normal capacity, the price of oil fluctuated greatly. West Texas Intermediate crude oil futures reached a record high of over $70 per barrel ($0.44/L). There were many reports to Louisiana authorities and elsewhere of price gouging, not only for gasoline, but also for other needed items such as bottled water. In some areas, gasoline was being sold for as much as $6 per gallon ($1.59 per liter). One BP station in Stockbridge, Georgia, south of Atlanta, was selling gas at $5.87 per gallon ($1.55 per liter) less than a day after Katrina hit. Just before the storm, average fuel prices were approximately $2.50 per US gallon ($0.66/L). International oil prices also rose. In the United Kingdom, pump prices for unleaded petrol (gas) hit £1 per litre ($7 per U.S. gallon) for the first time in a significant number of places (averaging about 95p), a rise of about 3% from pre-Katrina prices. Wholesale prices were up 5% by September 6.

Long lines developed at some gas stations throughout the U.S. as customers rushed to buy gasoline, anticipating price increases in the wake of the storm. Emphasizing the seriousness of the situation and in light of similar incidents in his own state, Governor Mike Easley of North Carolina has issued a statement asking all North Carolinians to conserve gas, limit fuel consumption and non-essential road trips, and for state employees to car pool. On the day of the Governor's announcement, many gas stations around the state ran out of gas and lines were formed at others.

By 12:00 p.m. CDT on August 31, eight Gulf of Mexico refineries remained shut down and one was operating at reduced capacity. Evaluation of five of the eight refineries was delayed due to limited access. Aside from the problems involved in restarting the refineries (which is a lengthy process) there were additional major issues with worker housing, since a large proportion of homes were destroyed by the hurricane.

The Environmental Protection Agency moved to reduce prices by temporarily lifting fuel standards in America until September 15. Some crude oil was also released from the Strategic Petroleum Reserve, as well, to combat prices as major economic consequences were predicted if prices remained high for a long period of time — leading consumer spending to drop and causing many foreign economies, especially in Asia, to suffer. President Bush also temporarily waived the Jones Act, allowing foreign oil companies to ship oil between ports of the United States.

By September 7, Gulf oil production had returned to 42% of normal. Of 10 refineries that were shut down by Katrina, four were expected to be back at full capacity within a week, however another four could be out of commission for months.

== Gambling and entertainment ==
Katrina forced many casinos along the Mississippi Gulf Coast to close and evacuate. The Hard Rock Hotel & Casino was scheduled to open the first week of September, but did not open until June 30, 2007. The Beau Rivage was severely damaged by water that reached the third floor, but seems to have suffered the least damage of the beachfront casinos. Grand Casino Biloxi had its mammoth gaming barge blown across U.S. 90. Treasure Bay's pirate ship was heavily damaged and washed ashore, it was subsequently dismantled down to the underlying barge. The President Casino Biloxi was washed across U.S. 90 and landed on top of a Holiday Inn, nearly a mile (1.6 km) from the casino's berth.

In Gulfport, the western Grand Casino Gulfport barge, containing Kid's Quest, washed across U.S. 90 and was left blocking the highway. The Copa Casino barge was pushed onto land next to the Grand Casino Gulfport's parking garage. Casino Magic and Isle of Capri in Biloxi both suffered heavy damage to their gaming barges, likely beyond repair. Before the storm, at least 14,000 people were employed at Gulf Coast casinos.

Six Flags New Orleans was shut down to prepare for the storm and begin evacuation procedures.

Harrah's New Orleans closed shortly before the storm and sustained storm damage. The building was also used by first responders as a base of operations in the days following the storm. The casino reopened on February 17, 2006, just in time for Mardi Gras, and the Beau Rivage Resort and Casino in Biloxi, Mississippi, reopened on August 29, 2006, on the one year anniversary of Hurricane Katrina's landfall. The Grand Casino Biloxi is undergoing extensive renovation, and is expected to reopen during the summer of 2006. The Grand Casino Gulfport was destroyed as portions of the structure collapsed across Highway 90 and was demolished.

Mississippi will lose approximately $500,000 in tax revenue for each day that the Biloxi-area riverboat casinos are closed, and about $140,000 per day for the South River region casinos. As a comparison, in 2004, Mississippi earned $2.7 billion in casino revenues, third behind Nevada and New Jersey ($10.3 billion and $4.8 billion, respectively).

Katrina was directly related to the controversial National Basketball Association Seattle SuperSonics relocation to Oklahoma City. New Orleans' NBA franchise was forced to move temporarily; the Hornets (now known as the Pelicans after Saints owner Tom Benson purchased the team in 2013) chose a mix of the Pete Maravich Assembly Center in Baton Rouge, and the Ford Center in Oklahoma City while New Orleans Arena was being rebuilt. The success of the Hornets in the Ford Center (which the Hornets had a deal where the team would split its games for two years) directly led to Oklahoma City interests purchasing the Seattle SuperSonics, which was for sale, and move to become the Oklahoma City Thunder in 2008.

== Agriculture and forestry ==
According to the United States Department of Agriculture (USDA), the national impact of Hurricane Katrina on Gulf Coast crops was minimal, with most of the damage borne by minor producers of major crops (corn, soybeans, and cotton). The main impact of the storm on agriculture is likely to involve ocean shipping and exports. In 2004, 22% of U.S. wheat exports, 71% of corn exports, and 65% of soybean exports passed through Gulf ports. Shipping did not occur until later in the fall, when ports would again be operational.

In addition to the 50 Mississippi counties covered by the Presidential primary natural disaster designation, the USDA declared an additional 31 counties as primary agricultural disaster areas. This made farmers and other agricultural producers eligible for low interest emergency loans to cover losses. The remaining four Mississippi counties were classified as, "contiguous" and were also eligible for assistance.

Gulfport, Mississippi serves as a major ocean shipping port for the southern United States, which was found to be inoperable for as much as one year. Chiquita, Dole, Crowley, Gearbulk, P&O and others had significant operations in Gulfport. On a short-term basis these companies have relocated necessary operations to unaffected ports.

Forestry constitutes a major industry in southern Mississippi, accounting for 10% of all jobs in the state. According to the Mississippi Forestry Commission, Hurricane Katrina caused significant damage to 1.3 million acres (5,300 km^{2}) of forestland in the state. The greatest damage occurred from the coastal counties northward to Laurel, with heavy damage to pine forests in Hancock, Harrison, and Pearl River countries.

An estimated 14.6 million cords (52,900,000 m³) of wood to be pulped for paper and 3.2 billion board feet (7,600,000 m³) of sawtimber were destroyed. The estimated economic impact of this loss was $1.3 billion. Additionally, there was an estimated $1.1 billion in damage to urban trees in 181 Mississippi communities.

== Utilities ==
The local electric utility Entergy Corporation was impacted severely, and Entergy New Orleans filed for bankruptcy protection on September 23, 2005. The company cited lower revenue and storm restoration costs as the primary cause. Parent company Entergy Corporation promptly arranged $100 million in financing.

== Insurance response ==
The Insurance Information Institute reports that Hurricane Katrina was the costliest disaster in the history of insurance. It said that the insurance industry paid $41.1 billion ($45.1 billion in 2009 dollars) and more than 1.7 million claims – across six states. Some 15,000 claims adjusters from across the country were called in to handle the record number of claims for damage to homes, businesses and vehicles. Louisiana accounted for 63 percent of insured losses and Mississippi accounted for one-third. In addition, the federal government-operated National Flood Insurance Program (NFIP) paid out $16.1 billion in claims from flooding. Damage from flooding, including storm surge from a hurricane, is covered by the NFIP, but is not covered under standard homeowners insurance policies. The institute also said another $2 billion to $3 billion of insured damages occurred at off-shore energy facilities.

== See also ==
- Damage to infrastructure by Hurricane Katrina
- Economic impact analysis
- Oil price increases since 2003
