= Louisiana Offshore Oil Port =

Deep-water port in the Gulf of Mexico

Coordinates: 28.8852°N 90.02508°W

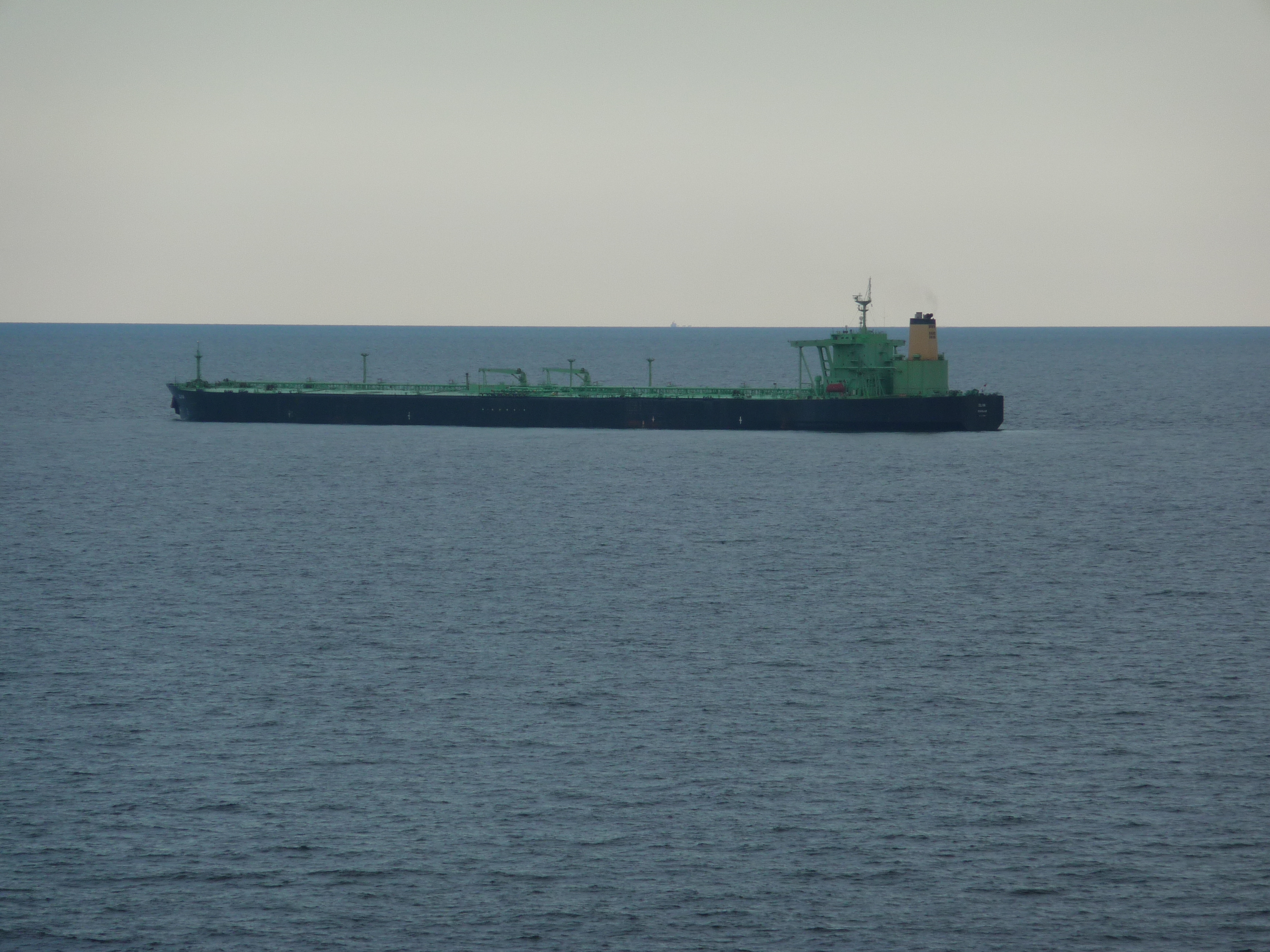
Tanker Oliva offloading at LOOP.

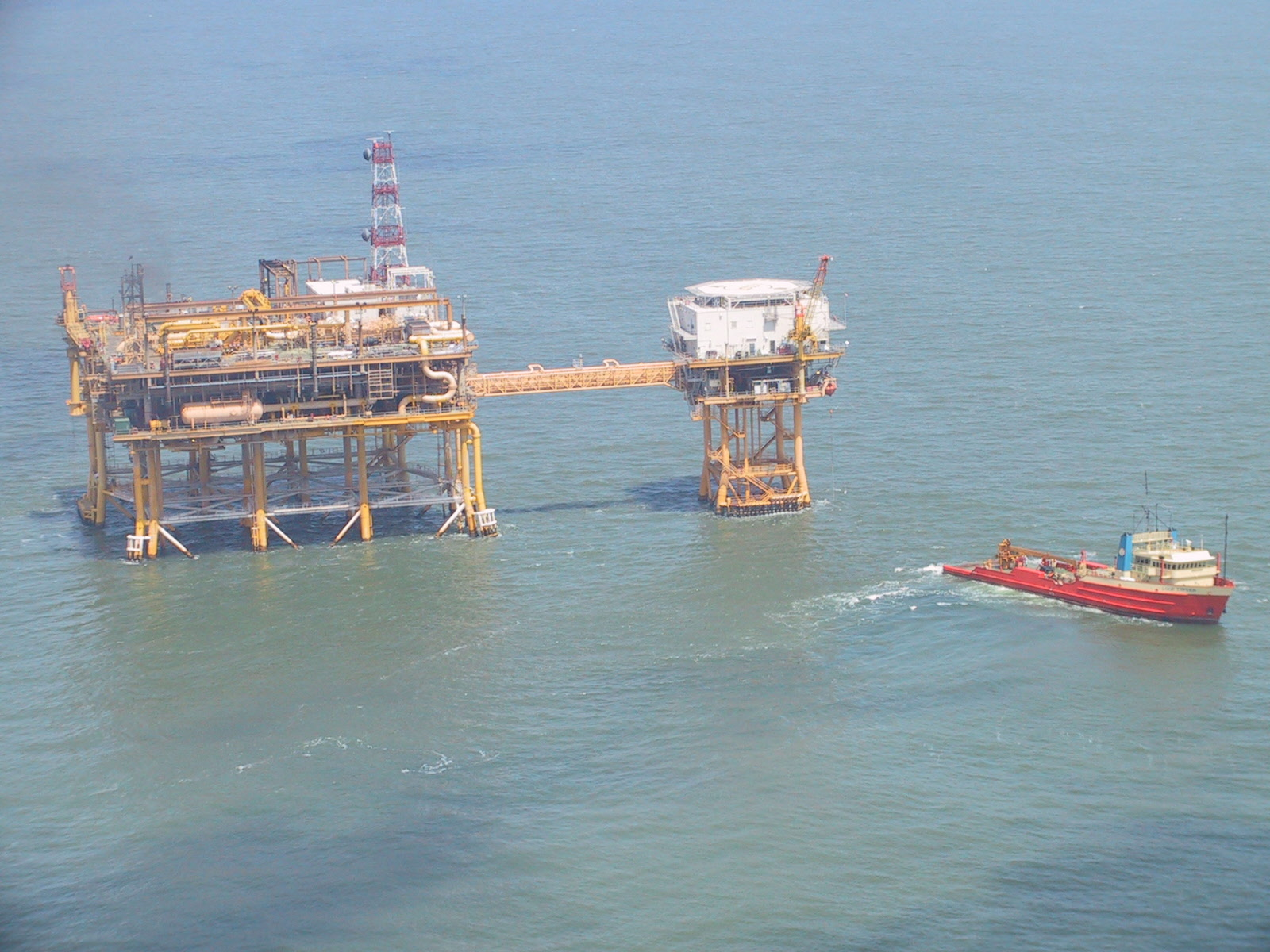
LOOP Pumping Platform Complex.

The Louisiana Offshore Oil Port (LOOP) is a deepwater port in the Gulf of Mexico 29 kilometers (18 nautical miles) off the coast of Louisiana near the town of Port Fourchon. LOOP provides tanker offloading and temporary storage services for crude oil transported on some of the largest tankers in the world. Most tankers offloading at LOOP are too large for U.S. inland ports. LOOP handles 13 percent of the nation's foreign oil, about 1.2 million barrels (190,000 m^{3}) a day, and connects by pipeline to 50 percent of the U.S. refining capability.

== Description ==
Tankers offload at LOOP by pumping crude oil through hoses connected to a Single Buoy Mooring (SBM) base. Three SBMs are located 8,000 feet (2.4 km) from the Marine Terminal. The SBMs are designed to handle ships up to 700,000 deadweight tons (635,000 metric tonnes). The crude oil then moves to the Marine Terminal via a 56-inch (1.4 m) diameter submarine pipeline. The Marine Terminal consists of a control platform and a pumping platform.

The control platform is equipped with a helicopter pad, living quarters, control room, vessel traffic control station, offices and life support equipment. The pumping platform contains four 7,000-hp (5 MW) pumps, power generators, metering and laboratory facilities. Crude oil is only handled on the pumping platform where it is measured, sampled, and boosted to shore via a 48-inch (1.2 m) diameter pipeline.

The distance to shore puts LOOP outside U.S. territorial waters, and special agreements in international sea law are made to allow ships from other countries to come under U.S. jurisdiction to visit LOOP.

=== Onshore ===
LOOP's onshore facilities, Fourchon Booster Station and Clovelly Dome Storage Terminal, are located just on-shore in Fourchon and 25 miles (40.2 km) inland near Galliano, Louisiana. The Fourchon Booster Station has four 6,000-hp (4.5 MW) pumps which increase the pressure and crude oil flow en route to the Clovelly Dome Storage Terminal.

=== Storage ===
The Clovelly Dome Storage Terminal is used to store crude oil in underground salt domes before it is shipped to the various refineries. The terminal consists of eight caverns with a total capacity of 50 million barrels (7,900,000 m^{3}), a pump station with four 6,000-hp pumps, meters to measure the crude oil receipts and deliveries, and a 25-million-barrels (4,000,000 m^{3}) Brine Storage Reservoir. The brine reservoir is supersaturated with salts so as to prevent further degradation of the massive salt dome in which the eight caverns store the crude. This is because the supersaturated brine is much more dense than the crude oil, and as it is pumped into the caverns to push the crude to the surface and into the surface distribution systems. This results in virtually no loss of quality to the crude oil offload.
