= Boca de Catán =

Inlet of Tamaulipas

Coordinates: 24.98°N 97.71°W

Boca de Catan, also known as Boca de Catán, is an inlet located in the municipality of San Fernando in the Mexican state of Tamaulipas. It connects the Laguna Madre to the Gulf of Mexico. Boca de Catan is a breakpoint for tropical cyclone watches and warnings used by the National Hurricane Center of the United States.
