= Port Fourchon, Louisiana =

- Unincorporated community
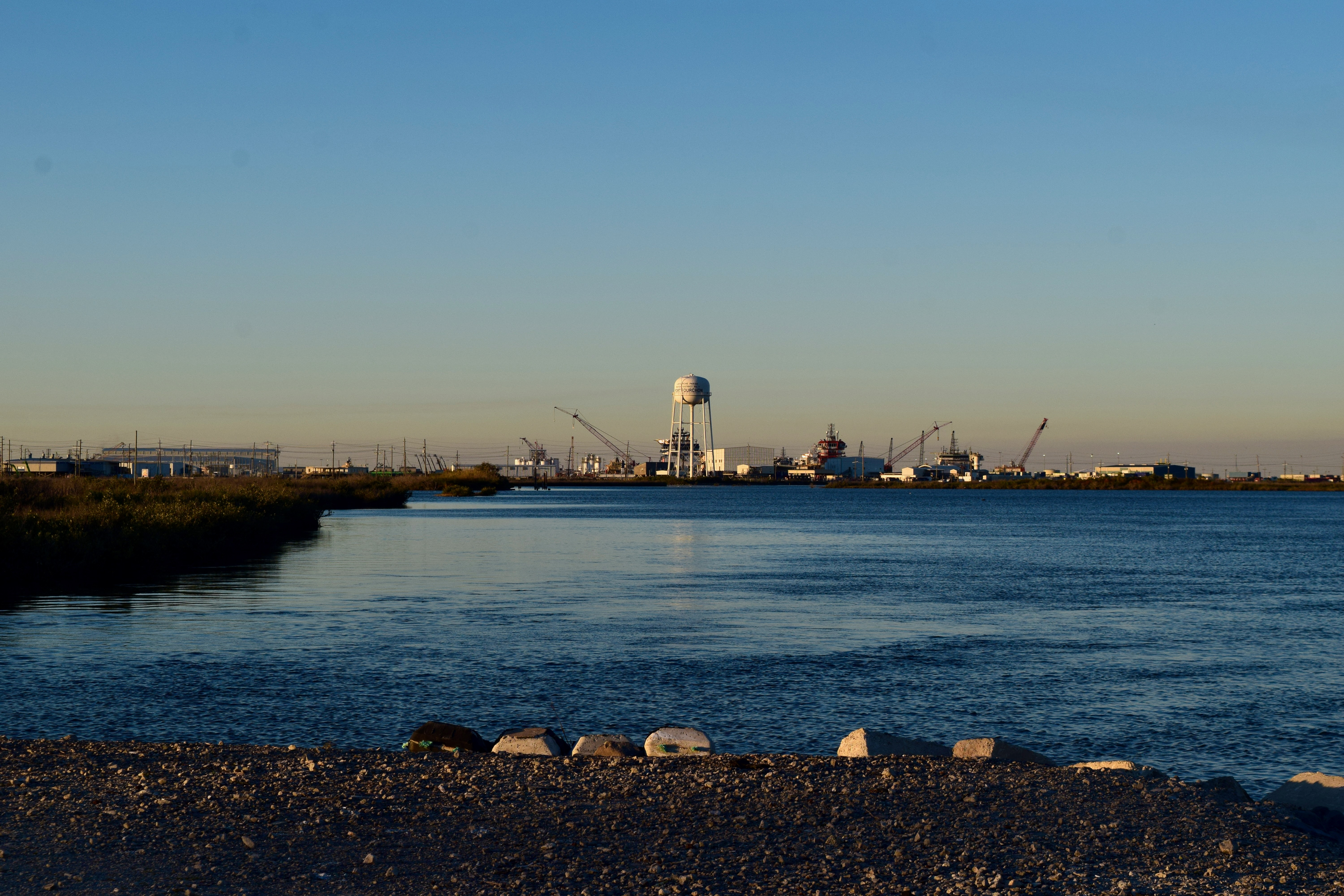

- Location in Louisiana Location in the United States
- Coordinates: 29°06′21″N 90°11′40″W
- Country: United States
- State: Louisiana
- Parish: Lafourche
- Elevation: 1 ft (0.30 m)
- Time zone: UTC-6 (CST)
  - Summer (DST): UTC-5 (CDT)
- Area code: 985

Port Fourchon is Louisiana’s southernmost port, located on the southern tip of Lafourche Parish, on the Gulf of Mexico. It is a seaport, with significant petroleum industry traffic from offshore Gulf oil platforms and drilling rigs as well as the Louisiana Offshore Oil Port pipeline. Fourchon's primary service markets are domestic deepwater oil and gas exploration, drilling, and production in the Gulf. Port Fourchon currently services over 90% of the Gulf of Mexico's deepwater oil production. There are over 600 oil platforms within a 40-mile radius of Port Fourchon. This area furnishes 16 to 18 percent of the US oil supply.

Port Fourchon is part of the Houma–Bayou Cane–Thibodaux Metropolitan Statistical Area.

== History ==
Port Fourchon was developed as a multi-use facility. It has historically been a land base for offshore oil support services as well as a land base for the Louisiana Offshore Oil Port (LOOP). In addition, there is commercial and recreational fishing, a foreign cargo shipping terminal, and an area for recreation and tourism.

The Board of Commissioners of the Greater Lafourche Port Commission is charged with ensuring the progress and continued development of Port Fourchon and the South Lafourche Leonard Miller, Jr. Airport. Nine members seated at-large comprise the Commission in lettered seats A through I. Every six years, the people of the Tenth Ward of Lafourche Parish elect all nine commissioners.

The Greater Lafourche Port Commission, established by the state of Louisiana in 1960 as a political subdivision of the state of Louisiana, exercises jurisdiction over the Tenth Ward of Lafourche Parish south of the Intracoastal Waterway, including the seaport and the airport. The Port Commission facilitates the economic growth of the communities in which it operates by maximizing the flow of trade and commerce, largely through Port Fourchon. Bristow Helicopters and Petroleum Helicopters International Inc. both operate helicopters out of the heliport at Port Fourchon that ferry people and supplies to the Offshore Oil Drilling and Production Platform Rigs in the Gulf of Mexico, such at the BP Thunderhorse PDQ that lies 150 miles to the South.

Port Fourchon was damaged by Hurricane Lili in October 2002. It did not take a direct hit by Hurricane Katrina on August 29, 2005, and was only slightly damaged. Sixteen years after Katrina, the center of category 4 Hurricane Ida made landfall in Port Fourchon at 11:54 am CDT, August 29, 2021, with sustained winds of 150 mph (240 km/h).

== Geography ==
Port Fourchon is a short distance off Louisiana Highway 1 (LA 1), the road to Grand Isle, via Louisiana Highway 3090. It is the southernmost point of Louisiana accessible by automobile.

As a critical infrastructure of national significance, LA 1 provides a vital link to Port Fourchon. In the mid-2000's, funding was sought to begin replacing a 17-mile (27-km) stretch of LA 1, the road into Port Fourchon. Having been designated as a "High Priority" corridor by Congress in 2001, a solution was needed to replace the road prone to flooding and natural disaster being outside the hurricane levee system. The replacement was an elevated highway that can stand up to a major storm and remain open even if the land around it floods. In 2007, a seven-mile (11-km) section of the project from Leeville to Port Fourchon, including a higher bridge across Bayou Lafourche, began construction and was completed in December 2011.

The next phase in the LA-1 Project looked to extend the elevated highway from within the flood gates of Golden Meadow to Port Fourchon. The final design was approved in December 2018 and funding was fully secured in 2022. The groundbreaking for the new 8.3 mile extension of elevated highway took place on June 24, 2022 with an estimated completion date of June 2027.

== See also ==
- Louisiana International Gulf Transfer Terminal Regional Center
- Port of New Orleans
