= Meteorological history of Hurricane Harvey =

Hurricane Harvey
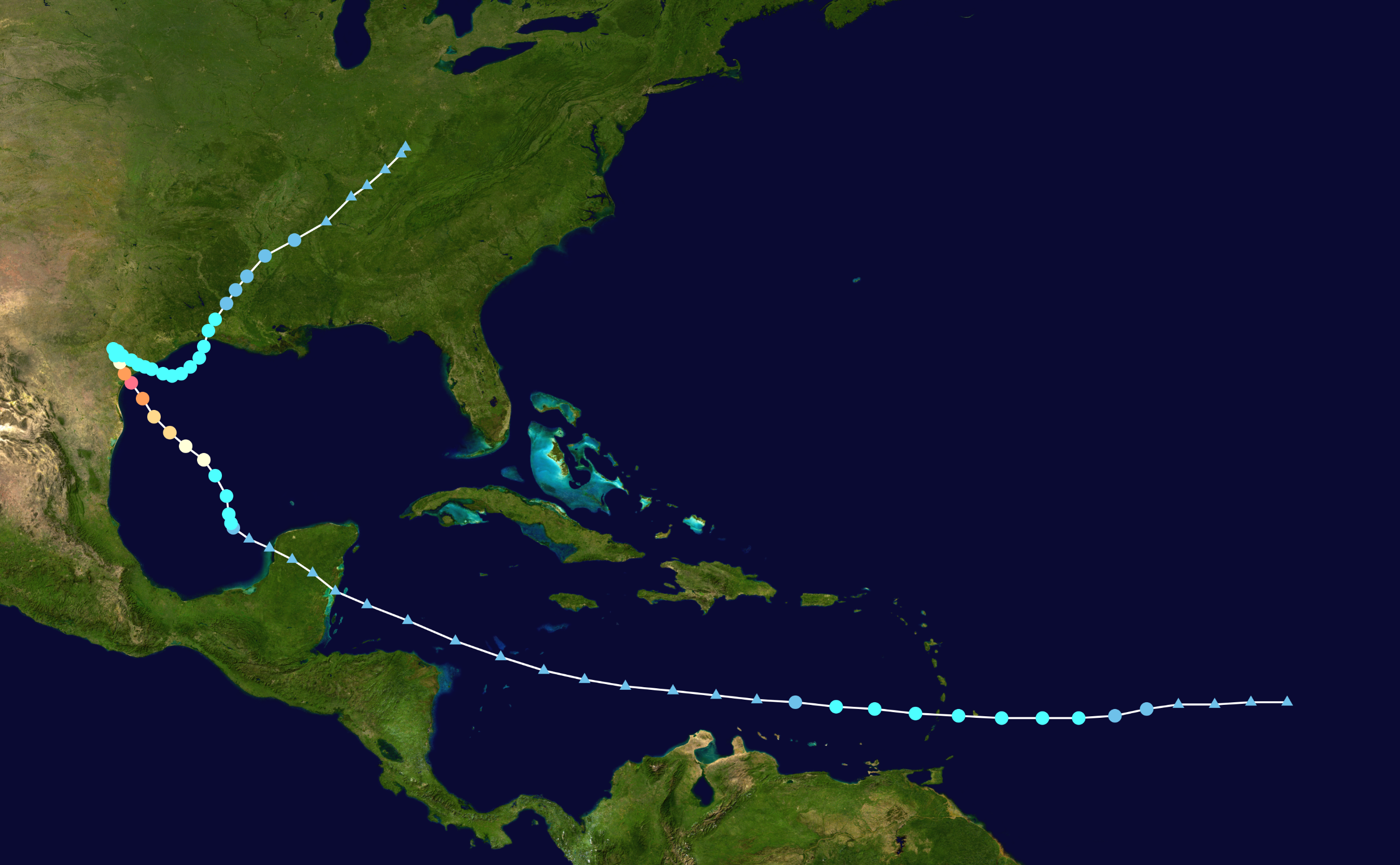
- Map plotting the track and intensity of Hurricane Harvey according to the Saffir–Simpson scale

Meteorological history
- Formed: August 17, 2017
- Extratropical: September 1, 2017
- Dissipated: September 2, 2017

Category 4 major hurricane
- 1-minute sustained (SSHWS/NWS)
- Highest winds: 130 mph (215 km/h)
- Lowest pressure: 937 mbar (hPa); 27.67 inHg

Overall effects
- Areas affected: Windward Islands, Suriname, Guyana, Nicaragua, Honduras, Belize, Yucatán Peninsula, United States (particularly Texas)
- Part of the 2017 Atlantic hurricane season
- History • Meteorological history Effects • Texas Other wikis • Commons: Harvey images

Hurricane Harvey was the costliest tropical cyclone on record (tied with Hurricane Katrina of 2005), and the costliest tropical cyclone on record in the state of Texas, inflicting roughly $125 billion in damage across the Houston metropolitan area and Southeast Texas. It lasted from mid-August until early September 2017, with many records for rainfall and landfall intensity set during that time. The eighth named storm, third hurricane, and first major hurricane of the 2017 Atlantic hurricane season, Harvey originated from a broad area of low pressure southwest of Cape Verde that was first monitored on August 13. Tracking steadily westward, the disturbance developed strong convection, a well-defined circulation, and sustained tropical storm-force winds, leading to the classification of Tropical Storm Harvey late on August 17. Moderate easterly vertical wind shear kept Harvey weak, as it continued westwards into the Caribbean Sea; despite repeated predictions for gradual intensification by the National Hurricane Center, Harvey eventually opened up into a tropical wave on August 19. The remnants of Harvey continued to move westwards and reached the Yucatán Peninsula on August 22, and were forecast to regenerate into a tropical cyclone after exiting land.

On August 23, Harvey moved into the Bay of Campeche and quickly developed a well-defined circulation, becoming a tropical depression later that day and a tropical storm fifteen hours later. Curving northwestwards into a favorable environment with low wind shear and high sea surface temperatures, Harvey began to consolidate and developed an eye. Rapid intensification ensued as Harvey approached the coast of Texas, with Harvey becoming a hurricane in the afternoon of August 24. Despite some dry air entrainment halting the intensification process for the rest of the day, Harvey soon resumed strengthening and became the season's first major hurricane in the evening of August 25. Continuing to deepen, Harvey attained peak intensity with maximum sustained winds of 130 mph (215 km/h)—Category 4 status on the Saffir–Simpson scale—and a minimum pressure of 937 mbar (27.67 inHg), as it made its first landfall near Rockport, Texas at 03:00 UTC on August 26. This made Harvey the first major hurricane to make landfall in the United States since Wilma in 2005, the first major hurricane in Texas since Bret in 1999, and the strongest in Texas since Carla in 1961. Rapid weakening began as Harvey made a second landfall just north of Holiday Beach three hours after its first, degrading to a tropical storm that evening. Trapped between two ridges to its west and east, Harvey dramatically slowed as it moved inland, but began drifting southeast back towards water on August 27.

Harvey reemerged over the extreme western Gulf of Mexico as a weak tropical storm early on August 28; by this time almost 30 in (760 mm) of rain had fallen in the Greater Houston area. Moving slowly east-southeastwards, Harvey would bring an additional 20 in (510 mm) of rain to Greater Houston and parts of southwestern Louisiana over the next three days, becoming the wettest tropical cyclone on record in the United States. Eventually, a trough moving over the Ohio Valley pulled Harvey northwards, and Harvey made a third and final landfall just west of Cameron, Louisiana, on August 30 before weakening into a tropical depression. Continuing to push inland, Harvey gradually lost tropical characteristics and transitioned into an extratropical cyclone on September 1.

== Origins and track through the Caribbean ==
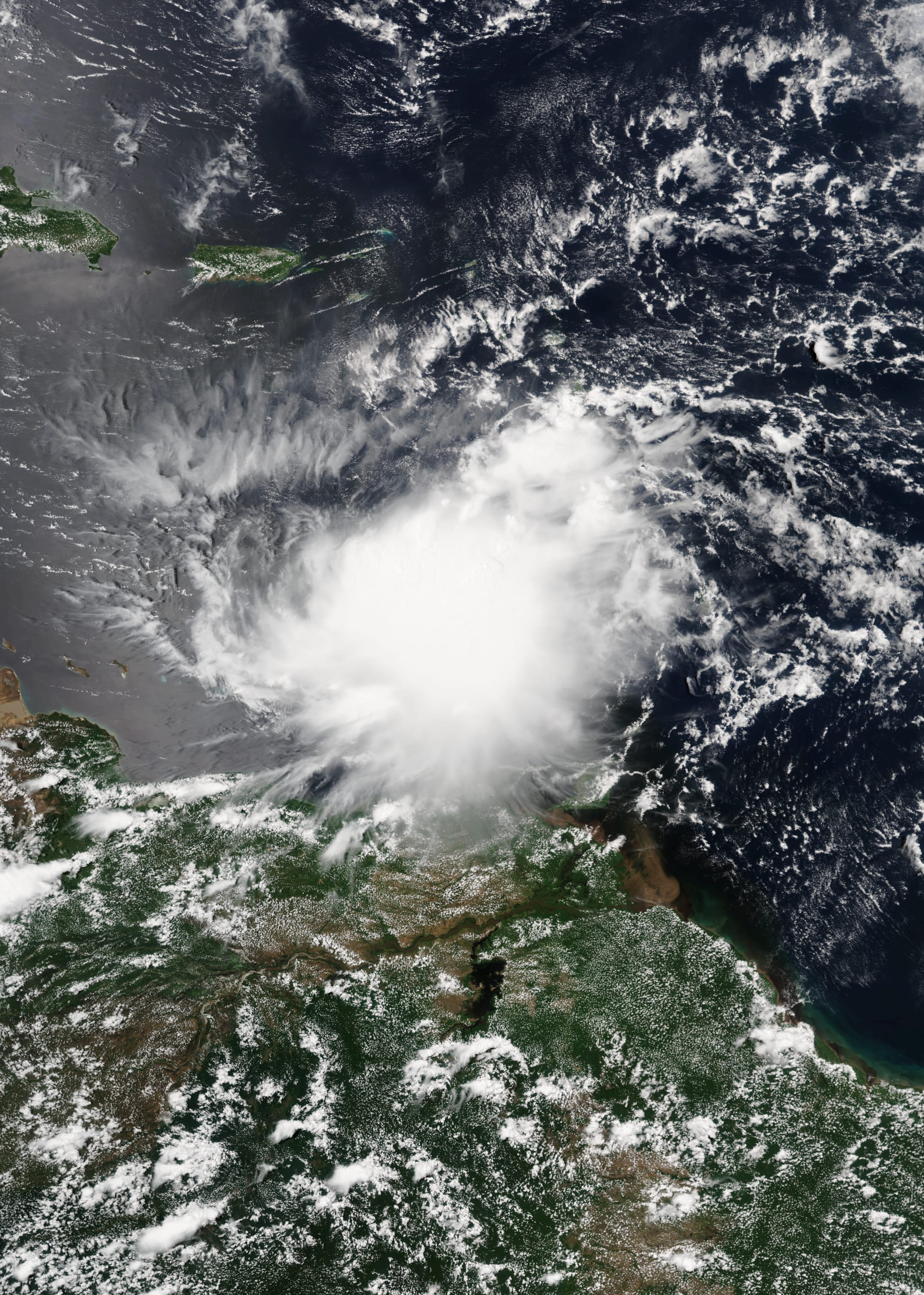
Tropical Storm Harvey over the Windward Islands on August 18

On August 12, a tropical wave moved off the west coast of Africa, accompanied by a large area of convection. The National Hurricane Center (NHC) began to track the wave the next morning, just before the convective mass dissipated. The tropical wave was expected to merge with a broad area of low pressure located southwest of Cape Verde and slowly consolidate, with the NHC giving a low chance of tropical cyclogenesis over the next five days. The merger failed to complete, however, with the two areas of disturbed weather remaining separate despite being contained by the same area of low pressure. The two systems completely split on August 15, with the original low-pressure area continuing westwards towards the Caribbean Sea, while the tropical wave to the east moved farther north. The tropical wave to the east would eventually become Potential Tropical Cyclone Ten off the coast of the Southeastern United States, which failed to develop into a tropical cyclone. Conditions in the Caribbean Sea though were not forecast to be conducive for development. Convection around the low began to increase that same day as a Kelvin wave passed through the area, but remained disorganized amid strong upper-level winds. However, the NHC noted that the low could experience a slight reprieve near the Lesser Antilles. On August 17, satellite imagery revealed that the system had become much more organized, with the circulation becoming better defined. Assessing it as having a high chance of tropical cyclogenesis over the next two days, the NHC began issuing advisories at 15:00 UTC on Potential Tropical Cyclone Nine roughly 295 mi (475 km) east of Barbados; this allowed tropical cyclone warnings and watches to be issued for the Lesser Antilles. Post-analysis revealed that a tropical depression had already formed by 06:00 UTC while located 505 mi (815 km) east of Barbados.

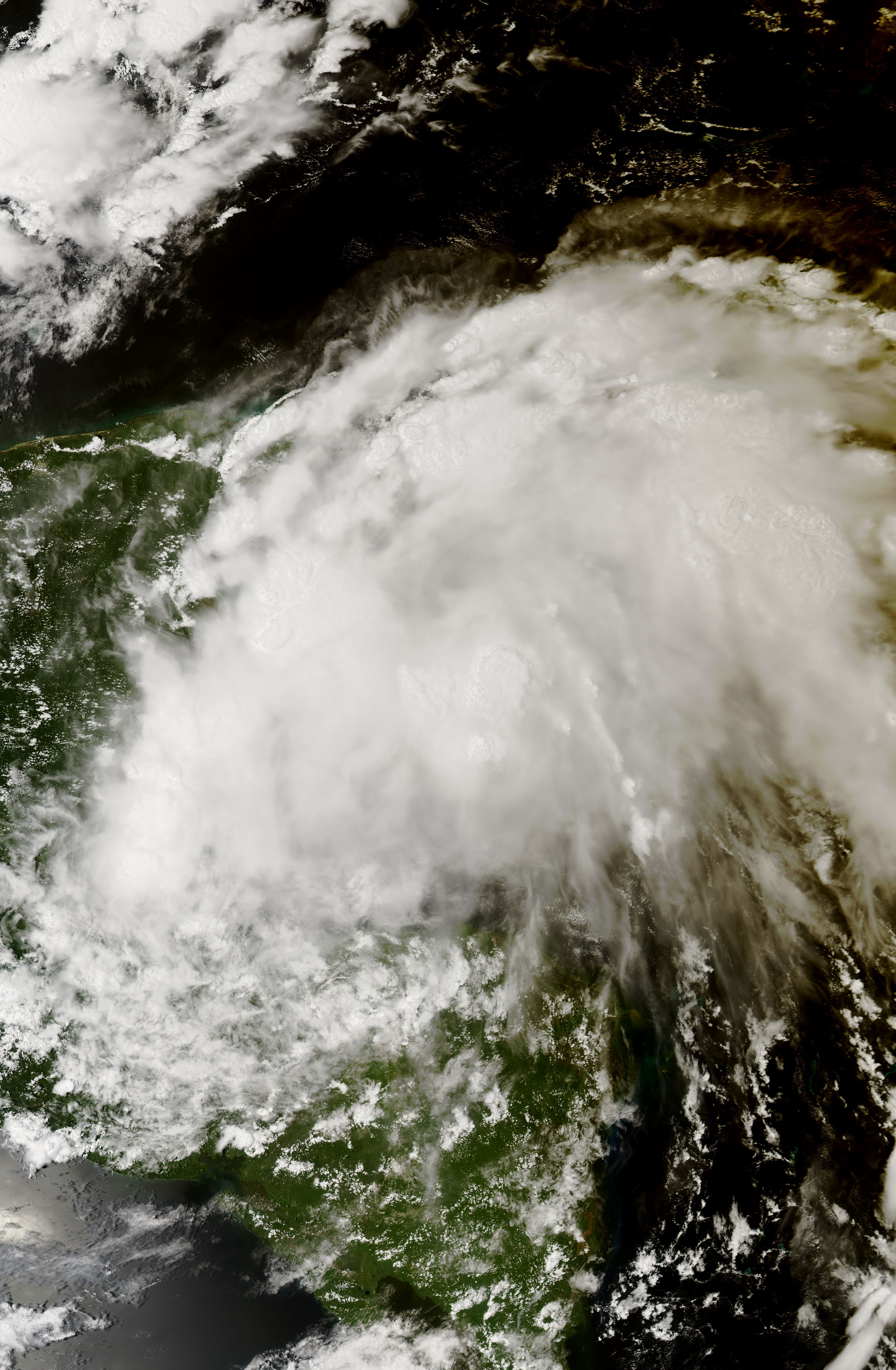
The remnants of Harvey in the Gulf of Honduras on August 21, within the shadow of a total solar eclipse.

An Air Force Reserve Hurricane Hunter aircraft investigating the disturbance from 18:00—21:00 UTC on August 17 detected a well-defined circulation center with strong convection sheared to the west. With the system already producing maximum sustained winds near 40 mph (65 km/h), the disturbance was immediately upgraded to a tropical storm and given the name Harvey. With Harvey moving due west at 18 mph (29 km/h) in an environment of moderate easterly vertical wind shear, the intensity forecast remained challenging; statistical and hurricane models called for Harvey to near or reach hurricane intensity, while the global models, most notably the ECMWF and the GFS, showed Harvey degenerating to a tropical wave within the next few days. Meanwhile, on August 18, Harvey's center passed over Barbados at 10:00 UTC and over Saint Vincent at 15:00 UTC with winds of 45 mph (75 km/h) and a central pressure of 1,004 mbar (29.65 inHg); both islands received little impact as Harvey's strongest winds were located well to the north. The latter scenario eventually played out as Harvey remained disorganized, with the low- and mid-level circulations becoming misaligned. In fact, a reconnaissance aircraft flying through Harvey on the next day was unable to find a closed mid-level circulation, although the low-level circulation remained intact. By 12:00 UTC on August 19, Harvey had degraded to a tropical depression. The weakening circulation opened up into a wave six hours later. Despite subsiding vertical wind shear ahead, Harvey's quick motion and proximity to dry air were expected to hinder reintensification for the time being. However, the NHC noted the possibility of Harvey regenerating near the Yucatán Peninsula or in the Bay of Campeche.

== Regeneration and rapid intensification ==
On the morning of August 20, the NHC began to feature the remnants of Harvey on their Tropical Weather Outlooks, assessing it with a medium chance of redevelopment over the next five days. However, this was increased to high just hours later after showers and thunderstorms associated with the system increased in coverage. The system regained winds of tropical storm-force later on August 20, yet a closed circulation still could not be found. Harvey's remnant trough continued to move steadily westwards to west-northwestwards towards Belize and the Yucatán Peninsula through August 21, passing over the latter on August 22. As the low-pressure area associated with ex-Harvey moved over land, its circulation became better defined, and the NHC noted that tropical cyclone development was almost a certainty over the next few days as the system entered the Bay of Campeche. At this time, the NHC also mentioned the possibility of hurricane-force winds affecting the coast of Texas. The NHC's forecasts came to fruition at 12:00 UTC on August 23 as Harvey regenerated into a tropical depression 175 mi (282 km) west of Progreso, Mexico, after the presence of a closed circulation was finally confirmed.

Satellite animation of Harvey as it rapidly intensified near the Texas coast on August 25

Over the next few hours, Harvey continued to consolidate, with the radius of maximum winds decreasing to 70 mi (110 km) early on August 24. Moving slowly northwestwards to north-northwestwards in response to a weak ridge to the northeast, Harvey intensified to a tropical storm at 04:00 UTC. By that time, Harvey was located 440 mi (710 km) southeast of Port O'Connor, Texas. Further strengthening was anticipated, as wind shear over Harvey decreased with the weakening of an upper-level low over the northwestern Gulf of Mexico. In fact, the NHC assessed that the probability of rapid intensification—sustained winds increasing by 35 mph (55 km/h) in 24 hours—increased to 45 percent just five hours after Harvey had been declared a tropical storm. This forecast materialized shortly afterwards as Harvey began rapidly strengthening, with reconnaissance aircraft monitoring the storm at around 14:00 UTC reporting the structure had "markedly improved": a 15–20 nmi (17–23 mi; 28–37 km) eye had developed and the central pressure had fallen to 982 mbar (29.00 inHg). This resulted in a substantial increase in the intensity forecast, with the cyclone expected to be a powerful hurricane by the time it reached the Texas coastline. Less than two hours later, at 18:00 UTC, Harvey was upgraded to a mid-range Category 1 hurricane on the Saffir–Simpson scale based on additional aircraft data.

Afterwards, the intensification process stalled somewhat and the eye lost some definition, despite a steady decrease in the central pressure. This was attributed to likely dry air entrainment. Early on August 25, however, strengthening resumed again, with Harvey attaining Category 2 intensity at roughly 05:00 UTC that day. During this time, the satellite presentation improved significantly with the appearance of an intermittent eye feature embedded in a central dense overcast (CDO), as well as improving outflow. However, shortly afterwards, concentric eyewalls were reported within Harvey—signifying an eyewall replacement cycle—which prevented the sustained winds from increasing beyond 110 mph (175 km/h) for a while despite an unusually low pressure of 947 mbar (27.96 inHg), which is typical of a stronger storm. Despite this, Harvey managed to quickly strengthen into a major hurricane—a storm with winds of 111 mph (179 km/h) or greater—at 19:00 UTC that day. Rapid strengthening eventually culminated with Harvey reaching peak sustained winds of 130 mph (215 km/h)—a Category 4 hurricane on the Saffir–Simpson scale—at 23:00 UTC, as a well-defined eye formed within the hurricane. The pressure bottomed out at 937 mbar (27.67 inHg) hours later at 03:00 UTC on August 26, just as it was making landfall on San José Island.

== Texas landfalls and subsequent stalling ==
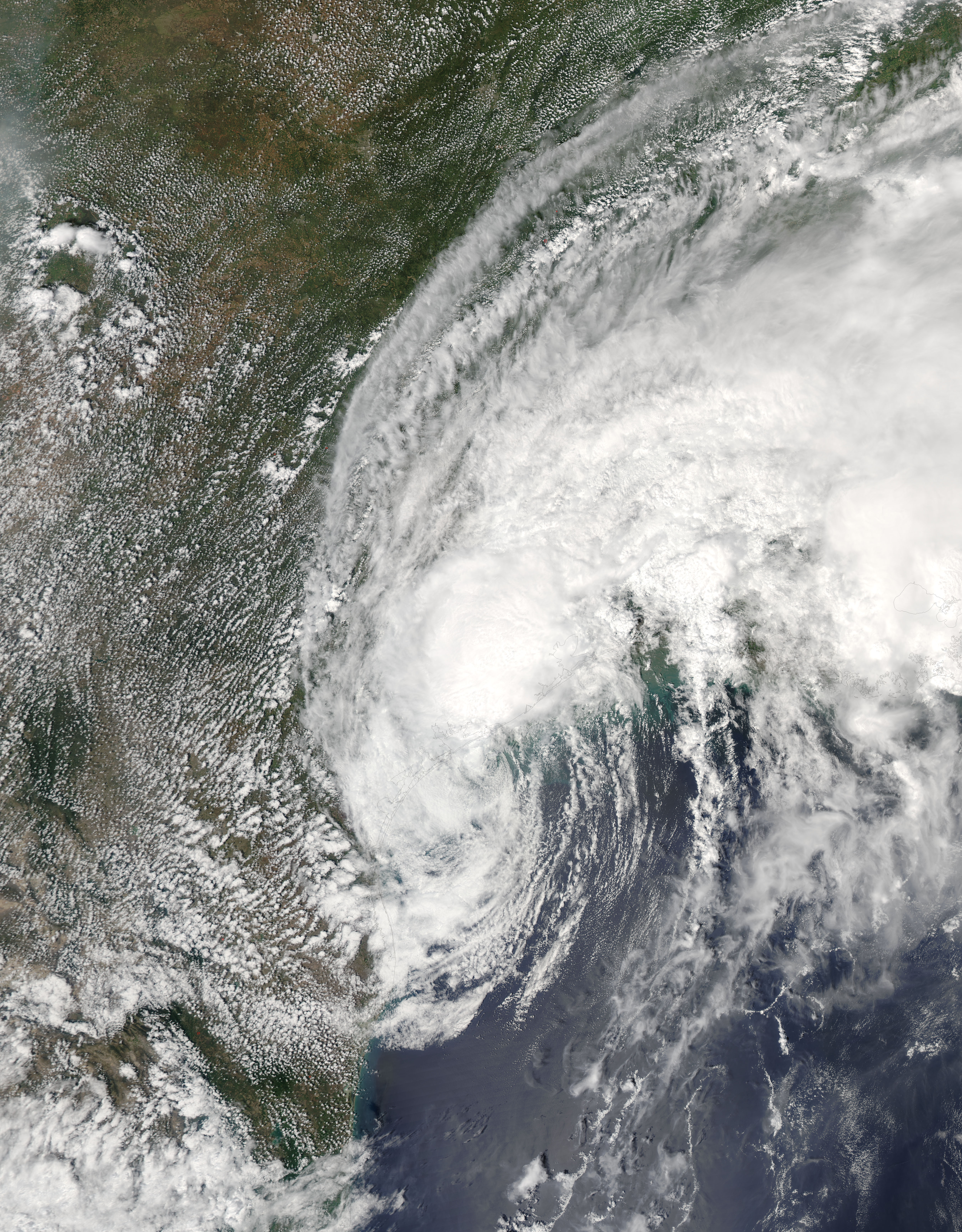
Harvey shortly after emerging into the Gulf of Mexico on August 28.

Harvey officially made landfall at 03:00 UTC on August 26 on the northern end of San José Island, 6 mi (9.7 km) east of Rockport, Texas, at its peak strength. This made Harvey the first storm to strike the United States at Category 3 intensity or higher since Hurricane Wilma in 2005. It was the strongest in terms of wind speed to hit the country since Charley in 2004, and the first hurricane to strike Texas since Ike in 2008. Harvey also became the first major hurricane in the state since Bret in 1999, as well as the strongest in Texas since Celia in 1970. A storm surge of 6–10 ft (1.8–3.0 m) was recorded between Port Aransas and Matagorda. Weakening began as the eye of Harvey moved further inland, and Harvey made a subsequent landfall on the northeastern shore of Copano Bay at 06:00 UTC with slightly lower winds of 125 mph (205 km/h). The weakening process accelerated as it slowly progressed northwest, with Harvey falling to minimal hurricane strength by 15:00 UTC as the central inner core collapsed and the eye disappeared from visible satellite imagery. Harvey's movement slowed to a crawl as the cyclone became trapped between two ridges to its east and west, which generated light steering currents that prevented any fast movement. Later that day, Harvey weakened to a tropical storm as the central convection continued to warm. As Harvey barely moved and continued dropping rain, catastrophic and record-breaking flooding occurred in the southeastern portion of the Lone Star state. During this time, a total of 52 tornadoes touched down, half of which occurred within or near Greater Houston. The strongest was rated EF2 on the Enhanced Fujita scale, which touched down near Evangeline, Louisiana on the evening of August 29. All of the other tornadoes were ranked at EF0 or EF1 intensity.

By late on August 27, the cyclone completed an anticyclonic loop and began a slow southeastward drift towards the Gulf of Mexico; at this time Harvey was only a minimal tropical storm. Deep convection formed repeatedly in Harvey's right semicircle as it had remained over water, which likely helped the system to sustain tropical-storm-force winds despite being centered over land. Still moving slowly, Harvey emerged back over water into Matagorda Bay late on August 28. Once back over the warm waters of the Gulf of Mexico, deep convection blossomed well to the north of the center of the tropical storm, which led to slight strengthening. The center of the storm continued to drift to the east-southeast into the early hours of August 29, but never strayed more than 70 mi (110 km) away from the Texan coast. Convection blossomed again later that day, with the center jumping northwards into the convection as Harvey began moving to the northeast. Consequently, Harvey's winds reached a third and final peak of 50 mph (85 km/h) at 18:00 UTC. As a ridge built over the western Atlantic, Harvey began to be steered north-northeastwards back towards the United States coast. Strong vertical wind shear weakened the storm somewhat as it approached the coast of Louisiana, though the central pressure continued to fall to around 990 mbar (29.23 inHg).

=== Rainfall and flooding event ===
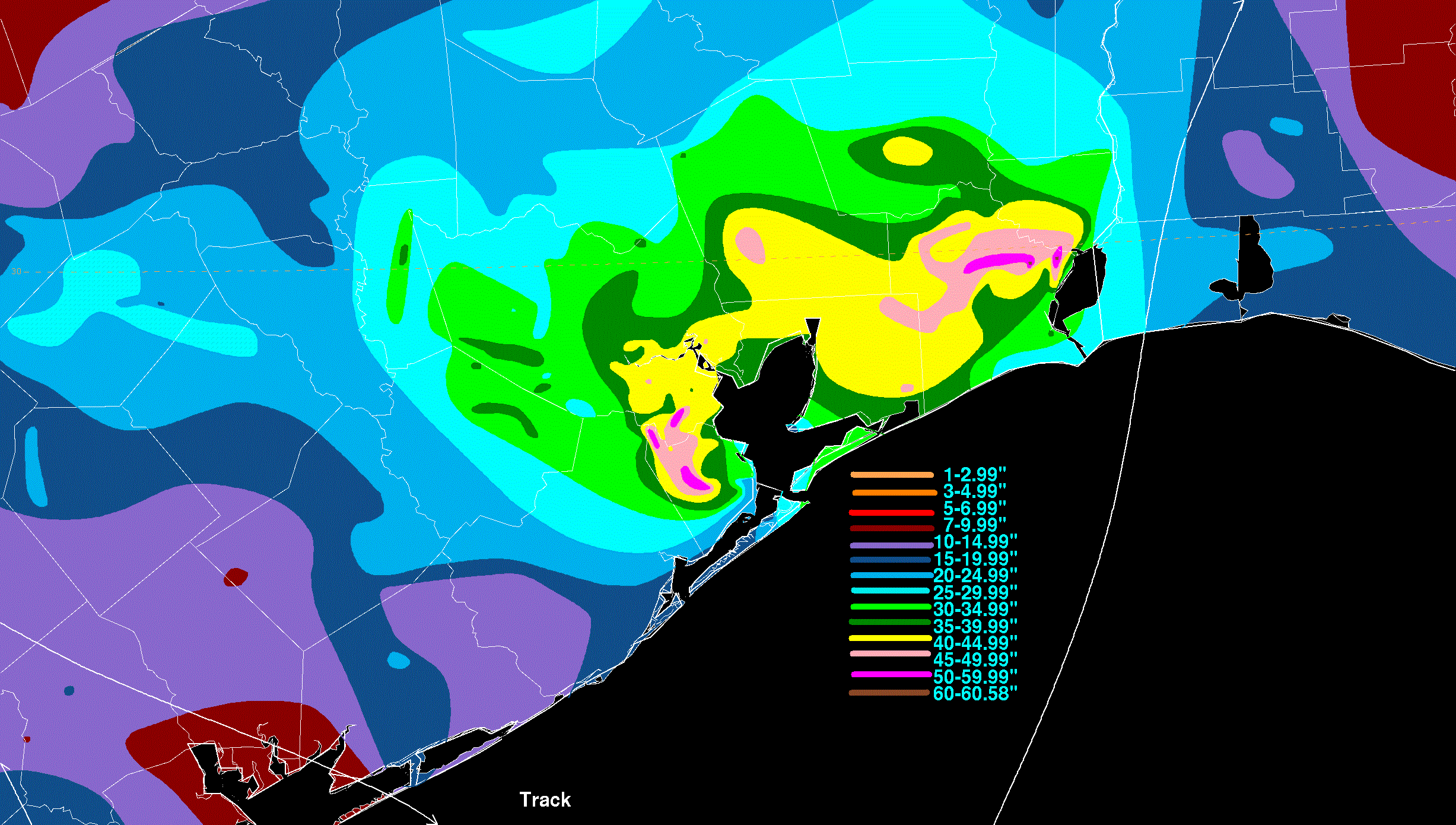
Rainfall accumulations from Harvey in southeastern Texas; the heaviest rains fell near Beaumont and Houston

Owing to Harvey's slow motion near and over Texas and Louisiana from 26 to 30 August, prolonged heavy rainfall and resulting widespread record-breaking and catastrophic flooding was observed in many parts of the two states, especially within the Houston metropolitan area. Harvey's combination with a weak stationary front located over the Southern United States resulted in baroclinic enhancement of heavy rains in that region. Warm moist air wrapping round the east side of Harvey's circulation converged with cooler and drier air and rose in a process known as isentropic lifting, creating prolonged heavy rains. As a result, the NHC declared Harvey "the most significant tropical cyclone rainfall event in United States history". The highest rainfall accumulations totaled over 60 in (1,500 mm), with a reading of 60.58 in (1,539 mm) at Nederland, Texas and another of 60.54 in (1,538 mm) near Groves, Texas. This well surpassed the previous records for tropical cyclone rainfall for both the continental United States, which was held by 1978's Tropical Storm Amelia, as well as for the entire United States, which was held by 1950's Hurricane Hiki. Rain rates of up to 6.8 in (170 mm) per hour contributed greatly to breaking daily and even monthly rainfall records in the region. The weather station at Houston's George Bush Intercontinental Airport observed all-time record daily rainfall accumulations on both August 26 and 27, measured at 8.37 and 16.07 in (213 and 408 mm) respectively. The total of 39.11 in (993 mm) of rain in August, mostly from Harvey, made that month the wettest ever recorded in Houston, more than doubling the previous record of 19.21 in (488 mm). Besides Houston, nearly the entirety of southeastern Texas received at least 3 ft (910 mm) of rain, and an estimated 25–30 percent of Harris County—about 444 sq mi (1,150 km^{2}) of land—was submerged. Louisiana was not spared by Harvey's rains, with peak accumulations at 23.71 in (602 mm) recorded west of Vinton, though radar data indicated that up to 40 in (1,000 mm) of rain likely fell. Elsewhere, Harvey also caused significant flooding in Tennessee where about a foot of rain was recorded.

== Final landfall and dissipation ==
The center of Harvey crossed the coast near Cameron, Louisiana, at 08:00 UTC on August 30 with winds of 45 mph (75 km/h) and a central pressure of 991 mbar (29.26 inHg). As the storm moved farther inland, weakening commenced once again and Harvey weakened to a tropical depression at 00:00 UTC on August 31. Consequently, the NHC issued its last advisory on the cyclone three hours later, with further information to be handled by the Weather Prediction Center (WPC). While continuing to generate heavy rainfall, Harvey began to lose its tropical characteristics, ultimately transitioning into an extratropical cyclone at 06:00 UTC on September 1 over the Tennessee Valley. Eventually, what was left of Harvey weakened to the point where the WPC terminated advisories on the storm, which it did at 15:00 UTC the next day. The remnants continued moving northeastwards while interacting with a developing low-pressure area over the Mid-Atlantic, dissipating shortly afterwards over northern Kentucky.

== See also ==
- List of Texas hurricanes (1980–present)
- Timeline of the 2017 Atlantic hurricane season
- 1932 Freeport hurricane
- Tropical Storm Allison
- Hurricane Florence
