= Effects of Hurricane Harvey in Texas =

Hurricane Harvey
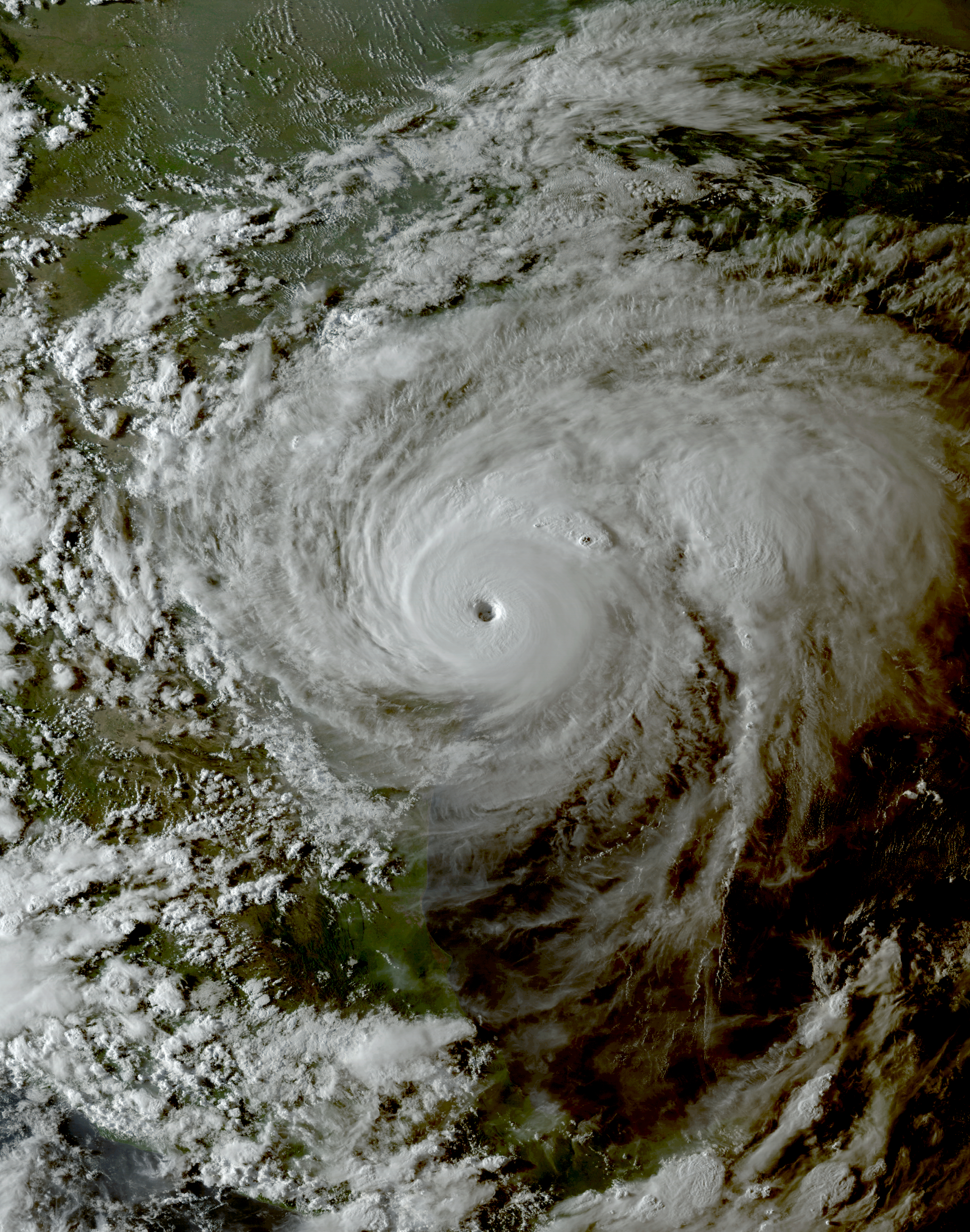
- Hurricane Harvey near peak intensity while approaching Texas on August 26

Meteorological history
- Duration: August 25–30, 2017

Category 4 major hurricane
- 1-minute sustained (SSHWS/NWS)
- Highest winds: 130 mph (215 km/h)
- Lowest pressure: 937 mbar (hPa); 27.67 inHg

Overall effects
- Fatalities: 103 (68 direct, 35 indirect)
- Damage: $125 billion (2017 USD)
- Areas affected: Texas
- Part of the 2017 Atlantic hurricane season
- History • Meteorological history Effects • Texas Other wikis • Commons: Harvey images

Hurricane Harvey caused historic flooding in southern Texas for four days in August 2017. Hurricane Harvey formed on August 17, 2017 east of the Lesser Antilles. Six days later, after degenerating back into a tropical wave and moving through the Caribbean Sea, Harvey reformed and rapidly intensified in the Gulf of Mexico. Early on August 26, Harvey made landfall in San José Island, Texas at a high intensity as a Category 4 hurricane with winds of 130 mph and a pressure of 937 mb. A couple of hours Harvey made another landfall in Holiday Beach as a slightly weaker high-end Category 3 storm. After that, Harvey rapidly weakened and stalled for multiple days over Texas, dropping torrential rainfall. Harvey eventually moved back into the Gulf on August 28, and a day later, Harvey made a fifth and final landfall west of Cameron, Louisiana.

The large and powerful hurricane dropped heavy rainfall over parts of southern and southeastern Texas. Over four days, Harvey dropped large amounts of rainfall, peaking at 60.58 inches (1,539 mm) in Nederland, Texas, making it the wettest tropical cyclone on record in the United States. The highest gust from Harvey was recorded at 140 mph (230 km/h) in Rockport, Texas, where every single building was damaged by the storm. Overall, Harvey contributed to 68 direct deaths and 35 indirect deaths–a total of 103–and caused at least $51.177 billion in damage in Texas alone.

== Preparations ==
Upon the NHC resuming advisories for Harvey at 15:00 UTC on August 23, a hurricane watch was issued in Texas from Port Mansfield to San Luis Pass, while a tropical storm watch was posted from Port Mansfield south to the mouth of the Rio Grande and from San Luis Pass to High Island. Additionally, a storm surge watch became in effect from Port Mansfield to High Island. Additional watches and warnings were posted in these areas at 09:00 UTC on August 24, with a hurricane warning from Port Mansfield to Matagorda; a tropical storm warning from Matagorda to High Island; a hurricane watch and tropical storm warning from Port Mansfield to the Rio Grande; a storm surge warning from Port Mansfield to San Luis Pass; and a storm surge watch from Port Mansfield to the Rio Grande. As the hurricane neared landfall on August 24, an extreme wind warning—indicating an immediate threat of 115–145 mph (185–233 km/h) winds—was issued for areas expected to be impacted by the eyewall; this included parts of Aransas, Calhoun, Nueces, Refugio, and San Patricio counties. The watches and warnings were adjusted accordingly after Harvey moved inland and began weakening, with the warning discontinued at 15:00 UTC on August 26. By 09:00 UTC on the following day, only a tropical storm warning and a storm surge warning remained in effect from Port O'Connor to Sargent. However, watches and warnings were re-issued as Harvey began to re-emerge into the Gulf of Mexico, and beginning at 15:00 UTC on August 28, a tropical storm warning was in effect for the entire Gulf Coast of Texas from High Island northward.

Governor Greg Abbott declared a state of emergency for 30 counties on August 23, while mandatory evacuations were issued for Brazoria, Calhoun, Jackson, Refugio, San Patricio, and Victoria counties, as well as parts of Matagorda County. On August 26, Governor Abbott added an additional 20 counties to the state of emergency declaration. Furthermore, the International Charter on Space and Major Disasters was activated by the USGS on behalf of the Governor's Texas Emergency Management Council, including the Texas Division of Emergency Management, thus providing for humanitarian satellite coverage. The Padre Island National Seashore also closed on August 24.

== Impacts ==
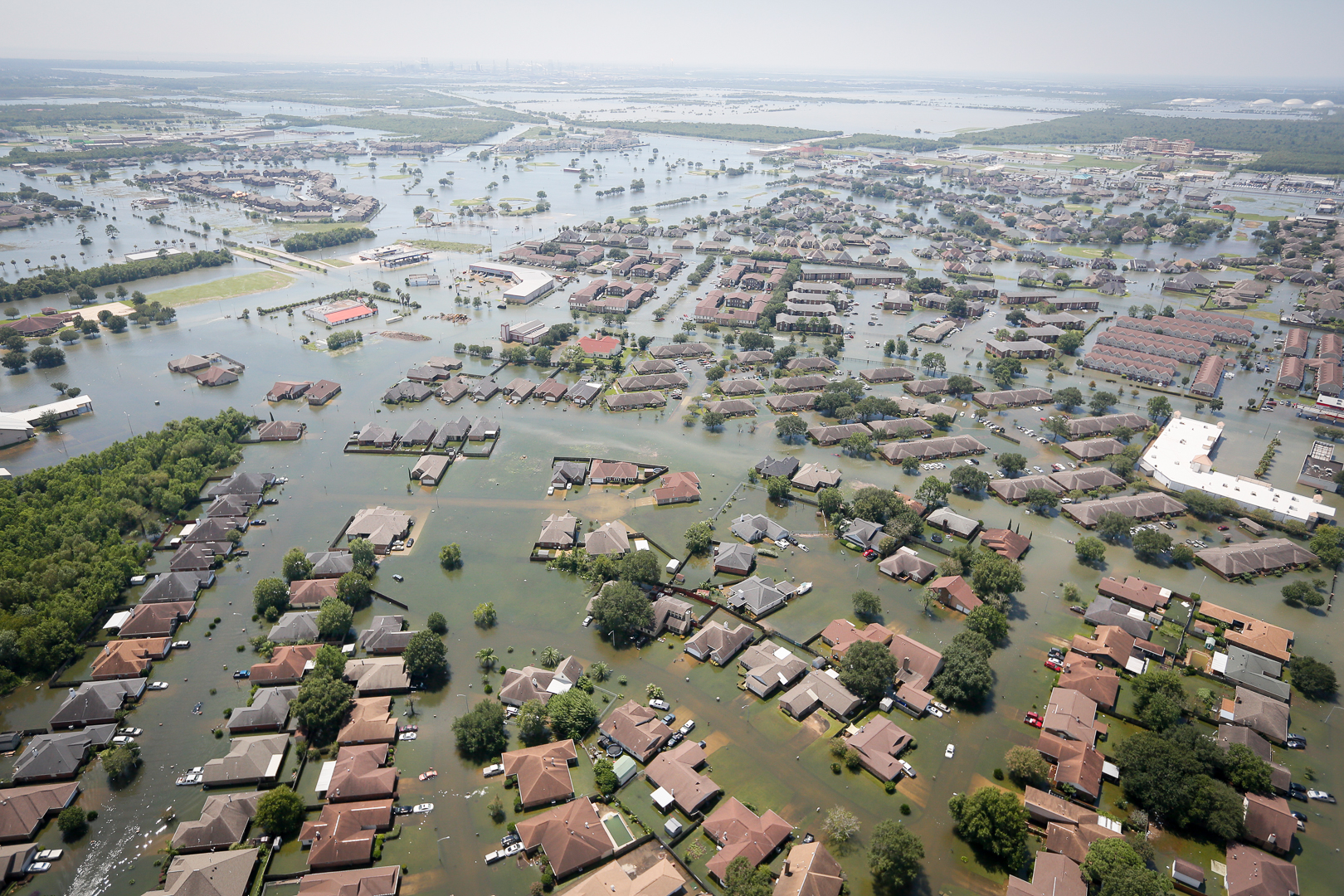
Flooding in Port Arthur, Texas on August 31.

22 weak tornadoes touched down throughout the state. An EF1 tornado near Fresno caused some minor injuries. Total damage from the tornadoes reached $7.601 million, according to the National Centers for Environmental Information.

Throughout Texas, approximately 336,000 people were left without electricity and tens of thousands required rescue. Throughout the state, 103 people died in storm-related incidents: 68 from its direct effects, including flooding, and 35 from indirect effects in the hurricane's aftermath. By August 29, 2017 approximately 13,000 people had been rescued across the state while an estimated 30,000 were displaced. The refinery industry capacity was reduced, and oil and gas production was affected in the Gulf of Mexico and inland Texas. On Monday, the closure of oil refineries ahead of Hurricane Harvey created a fuel shortage. Panicked motorists waited in long lines. Consequently, gas stations through the state were forced to close due to the rush. More than 20 percent of refining capacity was affected.

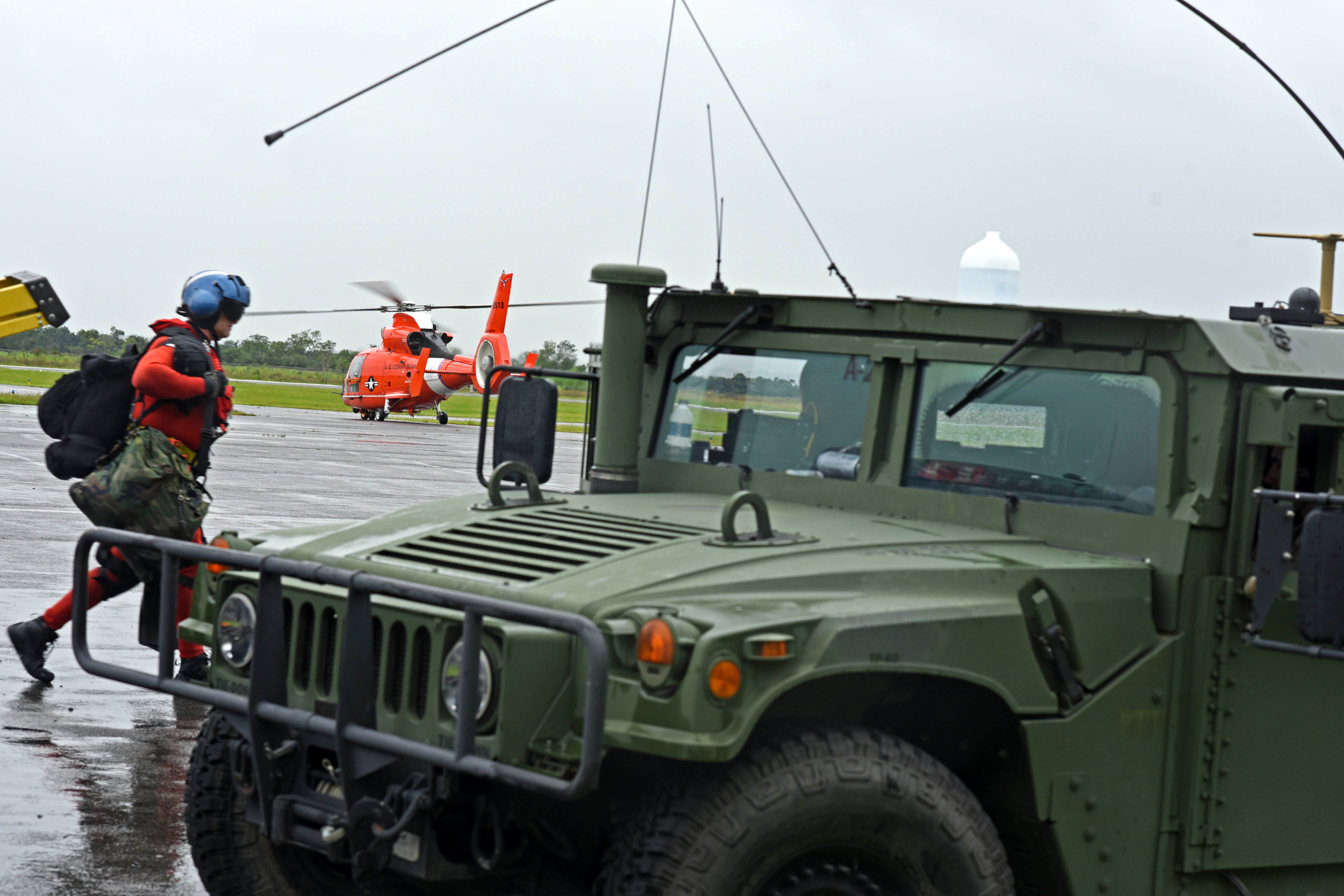
Coast Guard rescue swimmer is about to load up for rescue operations.

More than 48,700 homes were affected by Harvey throughout the state, including over 1,000 that were completely destroyed and more than 17,000 that sustained major damage; approximately 32,000 sustained minor damage. Nearly 700 businesses were damaged as well. Yet the Texas Department of Public Safety stated more than 185,000 homes were damaged and 9,000 destroyed. Over 500 roads closed throughout Texas, leading to the Texas Department of Transportation website receiving 5 million visits.

The hurricane also caused many people to believe that in the wild, only 10 individuals of Attwater's prairie chicken remained at most until Spring 2018, when it was discovered that there were about a dozen wild individuals left.

=== Landfall area ===
Coast Guard video during an overflight from Port Aransas to Port O'Connor, Texas, August 26, 2017

Making landfall as a Category 4 hurricane, Harvey inflicted tremendous damage across Aransas County. Wind gusts were observed up to 132 mph (212 km/h) near Port Aransas. Nearly every structure in Port Aransas was damaged, some severely, while significant damage from storm surge also occurred. In Rockport, entire blocks were destroyed by the hurricane's violent eyewall winds. The city's courthouse was severely damaged when a cargo trailer was hurled into it, coming to a stop halfway through the structure. The gymnasium of the Rockport-Fulton High School lost multiple walls while the school itself suffered considerable damage. Many homes, apartment buildings, and businesses sustained major structural damage from the intense winds, and several were completely destroyed. Numerous boats were damaged or sunk at a marina in town, airplanes and structures were destroyed at the Aransas County Airport, and a Fairfield Inn in the city was severely damaged as well. About 20 percent of Rockport's population was displaced, and they were still unable to return to their homes a year after the hurricane. One person died in a house fire in the city, unable to be rescued due to the extreme weather conditions. Just north of Rockport, many structures were also severely damaged in the nearby town of Fulton. In the small community of Holiday Beach, catastrophic damage occurred as almost every home in town was severely damaged or destroyed by storm surge and violent winds. By the afternoon of August 26, more than 20 in (510 mm) of rain had fallen in the Corpus Christi metropolitan area. All of Victoria was left without water and most had no power.

=== Houston metropolitan area flooding ===
Precipitation in Nederland, Texas

U.S. Navy sailors conduct a search and rescue mission above a residence in Beaumont, Texas.

Many locations in the Houston metropolitan area observed at least 30 in (760 mm) of precipitation, with a maximum of 60.58 in (1,539 mm) in Nederland. This makes Harvey the wettest tropical cyclone on record for both Texas and the United States, surpassing the previous rainfall record held by Tropical Storm Amelia. The local National Weather Service office in Houston observed all-time record daily rainfall accumulations on both August 26 and 27, measured at 14.4 and 16.08 in (366 and 408 mm) respectively. Due to the amount of rain accumulated from Harvey, the National Weather Service added 2 new colors to the rain index representing around 50% of the maximum rainfall dropped by Harvey. Multiple flash flood emergencies were issued in the Houston area by the National Weather Service beginning the night of August 26. In Pearland, a suburb south of Houston, a report was made of 9.92 in (252 mm) of rainfall in 90 minutes. The 39.11 in (993 mm) of rain in August made the month the wettest ever recorded in Houston since record keeping began in 1892, more than doubling the previous record of 19.21 in (488 mm) in June 2001. The 32.47 inches (825 mm) of rain from August 26–28 set a United States record for highest 3-day rainfall at a major city. The storm surge peaked at 6 feet at Port Lavaca, reducing outflow of rainwater from land to sea.

During the storm, more than 800 Houston area flights were canceled, including 704 at George Bush Intercontinental Airport and 123 at William P. Hobby Airport. Both airports eventually closed. Several tornadoes were spawned in the area, one of which damaged or destroyed the roofs of dozens of homes in Sienna Plantation. As of August 29, 14 fatalities have been confirmed from flooding in the Houston area, including 6 from the same family who died when their van was swept off a flooded bridge. A police officer drowned while trying to escape rising waters.

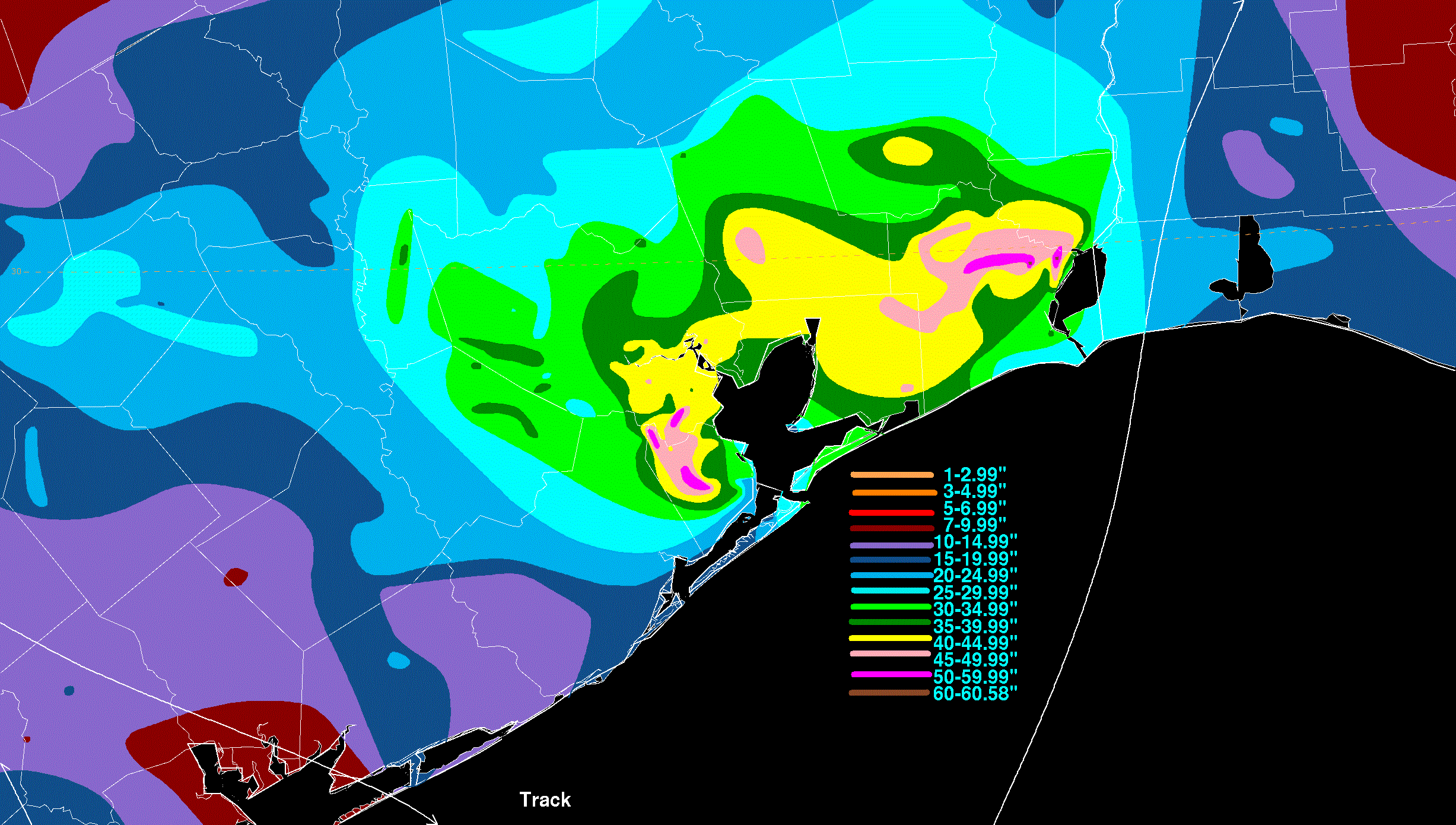
Enlarged map of rainfall from the hurricane in the Houston and Beaumont metropolitan areas in southeast Texas. Areas in blue indicate accumulations in excess of 15 inches (380 mm), while areas in yellow indicate accumulations in excess of 40 in (1,000 mm).

An estimated 25–30 percent of Harris County—roughly 444 mi^{2} (1,150 km^{2}) of land—was submerged.

Late on August 27, a mandatory evacuation was issued for all of Bay City as model projections indicated the downtown area would be inundated by 10 ft (3.0 m) of water. Flooding was anticipated to cut off access to the city around 1:00 pm. CDT on August 28. Evacuations took place in Conroe on August 28 following release of water from the Lake Conroe dam. On the morning on August 29, a levee along Columbia Lakes in Brazoria County was breached, prompting officials to urgently request for everyone in the area to evacuate.

On August 28, the U.S. Army Corps of Engineers began controlled water releases from Addicks and Barker Reservoirs in the Buffalo Bayou watershed in an attempt to manage flood levels in the immediate area. According to the local Corps commander, "It's going to be better to release the water through the gates directly into Buffalo Bayou as opposed to letting it go around the end and through additional neighborhoods and ultimately into the bayou." At the time the releases started, the reservoirs had been rising at more than 6 inches (150 mm) per hour. Many people began evacuating the area, fearing a levee breach. Despite attempts to alleviate the water rise, the Addicks Reservoir reached capacity on the morning of August 29 and began spilling out. The NASA Johnson Space Center was closed to employees and visitors due to the flooding until September 5. Only the critical mission control staff remained and resided in the control rooms to monitor procedures of the International Space Station.

=== Deep East Texas and Beaumont to Port Arthur area ===
Anyone who chooses to not [evacuate] cannot expect to be rescued and should write their social security numbers in permanent marker on their arm so their bodies can be identified. The loss of life and property is certain. GET OUT OR DIE!

— Jacques Blanchette, Tyler County Emergency Management

The Beaumont–Port Arthur metropolitan area also experienced torrential precipitation, including 32.55 in (827 mm) of rainfall in Beaumont. Rising waters of the Neches River caused the city to lose service from its main pump station, as well as its secondary water source in Hardin County, cutting water supply to the city for an unknown amount of time. Flooding to the north and east of the Houston area resulted in mandatory evacuations for portions of Liberty, Jefferson, and Tyler counties, while Jasper and Newton counties were under a voluntary evacuation. One death occurred in Beaumont when a woman exited her disabled vehicle, but was swept away. In Port Arthur, the mayor stated that the entire city was submerged by water. Hundreds of displaced residents went to the Robert A. "Bob" Bowers Civic Center for shelter, but they were evacuated again after the building began to flood. Water entered at least several hundreds of homes in Jefferson County.

=== Energy production ===
Energy production in the Gulf of Mexico declined in the wake of Harvey by approximately 21% — the output dropped to 378,633 barrels per day from the original 1.75 million barrels of oil produced each day. The Eagle Ford Rock Formation (shale oil and gas) in southern Texas reduced production by 300,000 to 500,000 barrels per day (bpd), according to the Texas Railroad Commission. Many energy-related ports and terminals closed, delaying about fourteen crude oil tankers. About 2.25 million bpd of refining capacity was offline for several days; that is about 12% of total US capacity, with refineries affected at Corpus Christi, and later Port Arthur and Beaumont, and Lake Charles, Louisiana. The price of Brent crude versus West Texas Intermediate crude oil achieved a split of US$5.

Two ExxonMobil refineries had to be shut down following related storm damage and releases of hazardous pollutants. Two oil storage tanks owned by Burlington Resources Oil and Gas collectively spilled 30,000 US gallons (110,000 L) of crude in DeWitt County. An additional 8,500 US gallons (32,000 L) of wastewater was spilled in the incidents.

On August 30, the CEO of Arkema warned one of its chemical plants in Crosby, Texas, could explode or be subject to intense fire due to the loss of "critical refrigeration" of materials. All workers at the facility and residents within 1.5 mi (2.4 km) were evacuated. Eight of the plant's nine refrigeration units failed without power, enabling the stored chemicals to decompose and become combustible. Two explosions occurred around 2:00 a.m. on August 31; 21 emergency personnel were briefly hospitalized.

Due to the shutdown in refineries, gas prices did see an increase nationwide. However, the increase was not as extensive as Hurricane Katrina. Additionally, Harvey's impact coincided with Labor Day Weekend, which sees a traditional increase in gas prices due to the heavy travel for that weekend. Nonetheless, the spike brought the highest gas prices in two years.

=== Sports ===
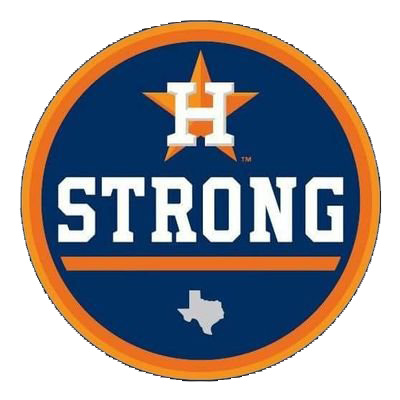
In the aftermath of the storm, the Houston Astros began wearing this patch during the 2017 season in support of the storm's victims in Houston. They eventually went on to win the World Series.

The flooding in Houston from the storm required the traditional Governor's Cup National Football League preseason game between the Dallas Cowboys and the Houston Texans scheduled for August 31 to be moved from NRG Stadium in Houston to AT&T Stadium in Arlington, Texas. The game was later canceled to allow the Houston Texans players to return to Houston after the storm. In addition, the Houston Astros were forced to move their August 29–31 series with the Texas Rangers from Minute Maid Park in Houston to Tropicana Field in St. Petersburg, Florida; ironically, just two weeks later, Hurricane Irma would force the stadium's regular tenants, the Tampa Bay Rays, to move three home games to Citi Field in New York City. This was despite a protectable roof at Minute Maid Park. In the aftermath, the Houston Astros began to wear patches which had the logo of the team with the word "Strong" on the bottom of the patch, as well as promoting the hashtag Houston Strong, prominently displaying them as the Astros won the 2017 World Series. Manager A. J. Hinch has stated in an interview that the team wasn't just playing for a title, but to help boost moral support for the city. The annual Texas Kickoff game that was to feature BYU and LSU to kick off the 2017 college football season was moved to the Mercedes-Benz Superdome in New Orleans, Louisiana. The NCAA FBS football game between Houston and UTSA was postponed due to the aftermath of the storm. It was originally scheduled for September 2 at the Alamodome in San Antonio and was ultimately canceled.

The Houston Dynamo rescheduled a planned Major League Soccer match against Sporting Kansas City on August 26 to October 11. The Houston Dash of the National Women's Soccer League rescheduled their August 27 match against the North Carolina Courage to a later date. Both teams moved their training camps to Toyota Stadium in Frisco, Texas (near Dallas) while preparing for their next matches; the Dash's match the following week, against the Seattle Reign, was played in Frisco, with all proceeds from ticket sales benefiting an American Red Cross relief fund for hurricane victims. The Dynamo and Major League Soccer also donated a combined $1 million into the hurricane relief fund, while also opening BBVA Compass Stadium to accept donated supplies for processing and distribution.

== Aftermath ==
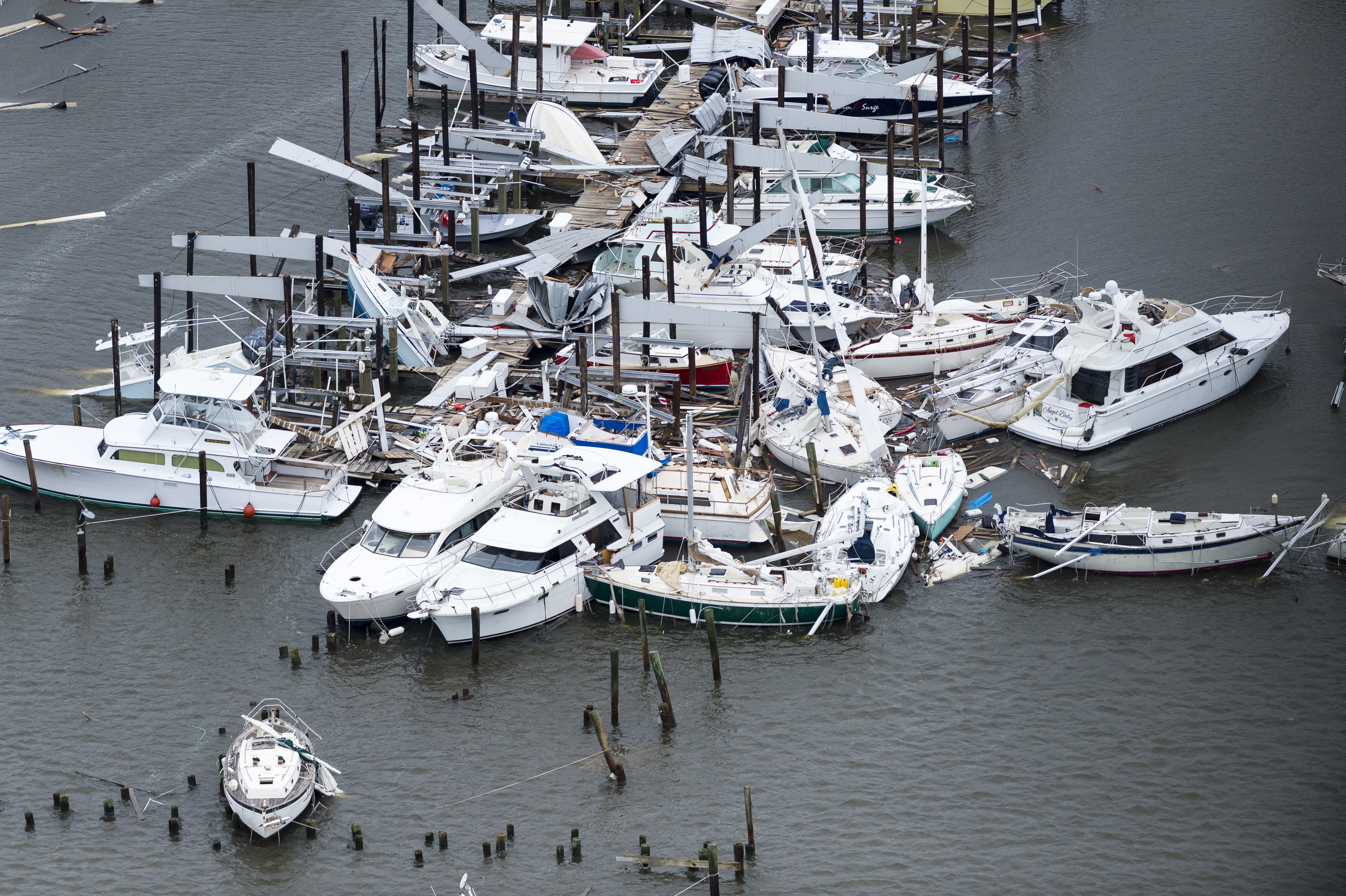
Damage by Harvey to a marina in Rockport, Texas, on August 28, 2017

Houston Mayor Sylvester Turner imposed a mandatory curfew on August 29 from midnight to 5 a.m. local time until further notice. He cited looting as the primary reason for the curfew. On August 29, U. S. President Donald Trump, First Lady Melania Trump, and U.S. Senators John Cornyn and Ted Cruz toured damage in the Corpus Christi metropolitan area. Trump made a formal request for $5.95 billion in federal funding on August 31 for affected areas, the vast majority of which would go to FEMA.

Texas Governor Greg Abbott deployed the state's entire National Guard for search and rescue, recovery, and clean up operations due to the devastating damage caused by the storm and resulting floods. Other states' National Guard's have offered assistance, with several having already been sent. Texas Civil Air Patrol units were activated to assist in search and rescue and damage assessment. Meanwhile, the United States Immigration and Customs Enforcement assigned approximately 150 employees from around the country to assist with disaster relief efforts, while stating that no immigration enforcement operations would be conducted.

Approximately 32,000 people were displaced in shelters across the state by August 31. The George R. Brown Convention Center, the state's largest shelter, reached capacity with 8,000 evacuees. The NRG Center opened as a large public shelter accordingly. More than 210,000 people registered with FEMA for disaster assistance.

The Cajun Navy, an informal organization of volunteers with boats from Louisiana, deployed to Texas to assist in high-water rescues.

The Houston Independent School District announced that all students on any of the district's campuses would be eligible for free lunch throughout the 2017–18 school year. The Federal Department of Education eased financial aid rules and procedures for those affected by Harvey, giving schools the ability to waive paperwork requirements; loan borrowers were given more flexibility in managing their loan payments. A 36-year-old inmate sentenced to death for a 2003 murder was granted a temporary reprieve as a result of Harvey, as his legal team was based in Harris County, an area heavily affected by the hurricane.

By August 30, corporations across the nation collectively donated more than $72 million to relief efforts, with 42 companies donating at least $1 million. Professional athletic teams, their players, and managers provided large donations to assist victims of the storm. The Houston Astros pledged $4 million to relief along with all proceeds from their home game raffles. Houston Rockets owner Leslie Alexander also donated $4 million to the cause. A fundraiser established by Houston Texans defensive lineman J. J. Watt exceeded $37 million. For his efforts, Watt received the Walter Payton NFL Man of the Year Award. The Texas Rangers and Tennessee Titans both provided $1 million, while the New England Patriots pledged to match up to $1 million in donations to the Red Cross. Multiple Hollywood celebrities also pitched in, collectively donating more than $10 million, with Sandra Bullock providing the largest single donation of $1 million. Leonardo DiCaprio provided $1 million to the United Way Harvey Recovery Fund through his foundation. Trump donated $1 million to 12 charities involved in relief efforts. Rachael Ray provided donations totaling $1 million to animal shelters across the Houston area. In the years following Hurricane Harvey, affected communities across Texas have proceeded with long term recovery efforts, including restoring infrastructure, rebuilding homes, and implementing improved flood control systems to reduce future damage from storms.

=== Economic loss estimates ===
Costliest U.S. Atlantic hurricanes (Note: The storm category color indicates the intensity of the hurricane when landfalling in the U.S.)
Rank	Hurricane	Season	Damage
1	3 Katrina	2005	$125 billion
1	4 Harvey	2017	$125 billion
3	4 Ian	2022	$112 billion
4	4 Maria	2017	$90 billion
5	4 Helene	2024	$78.7 billion
6	4 Ida	2021	$75 billion
7	ET Sandy	2012	$65 billion
8	4 Irma	2017	$52.1 billion
9	3 Milton	2024	$34.3 billion
10	2 Ike	2008	$30 billion

Moody's Analytics initially estimated the total economic cost of the storm at $81 billion to $108 billion or more; most of the economic losses are damage to homes and commercial property. Reinsurance company Aon Benfield estimated total economic losses at $100 billion, including $30 billion in insured damage, making Harvey the costliest disaster in 2017 by their calculations. USA Today reported an AccuWeather estimate of $190 billion, released August 31. On September 3, Texas state governor Greg Abbott estimated that damages will be between $150 billion and $180 billion, surpassing the $120 billion that it took to rebuild New Orleans after Katrina. According to weather analytics firm Planalytics, lost revenue to Houston area retailers and restaurants alone will be approximately $1 billion. The Houston area controls 4% of the spending power in the United States.

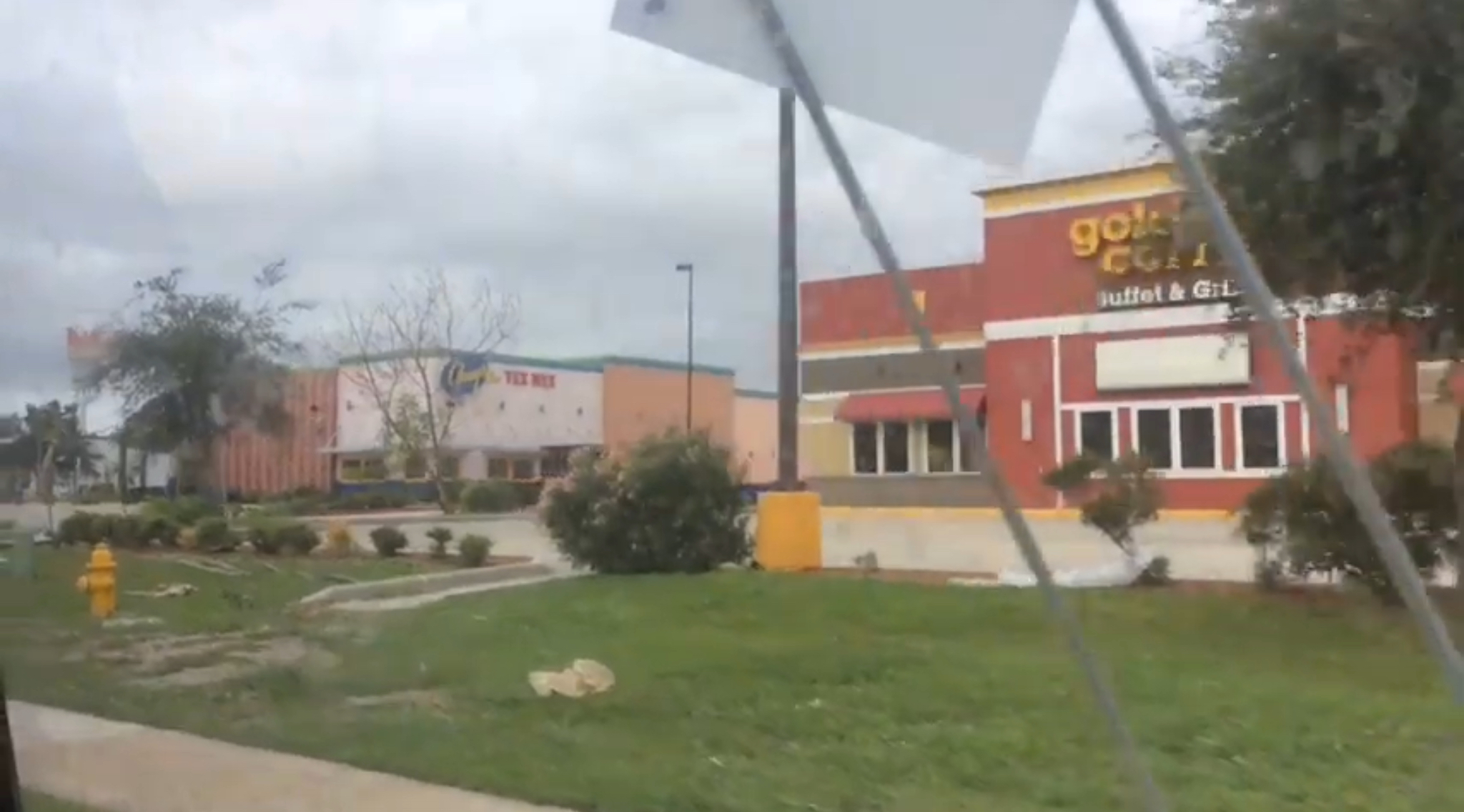
Debris was scattered across a road verge and a road sign was damaged in front of a Golden Corral in Corpus Christi

In September 2017, the Insurance Council of Texas estimated the total insured losses from Hurricane Harvey at $19 billion. This figure represents $11 billion in flood losses insured by the National Flood Insurance Program (NFIP), $3 billion in "insured windstorm and other storm-related property losses"; and about $4.75 billion in insured flood losses of private and commercial vehicles. By January 1, 2018, payouts from the NFIP reached $7.6 billion against total estimated losses of $8.5–9.5 billion. Economists Michael Hicks and Mark Burton at Ball State University estimated damage in the Houston metropolitan area alone at $198.63 billion. Preliminary reporting from the National Oceanic and Atmospheric Administration set a more concrete total at $125 billion with $41.124 billion coming from Texas alone, making Harvey the 2nd costliest tropical cyclone on record, behind Hurricane Katrina with 2017 costs of $161 billion (after adjusting for inflation).

A significant portion of the storm's damages are uninsured losses. Regular homeowner insurance policies generally exclude coverage for flooding, as the NFIP underwrites most flood insurance policies in the US. Although the purchase of flood insurance is obligatory for federally guaranteed mortgages for homes within the 100-year flood plain, enforcement of the requirement is difficult and many homes, even within the 100-year flood plain, lack flood insurance. In Harris County, Texas—which includes the city of Houston—only 15% of homes have flood insurance policies issued by the NFIP. Participation in the NFIP is higher, but still low, in neighboring Galveston (41%), Brazoria (26%), and Chambers Counties (21%). Homeowners sued authorities after reservoir releases damaged homes.

=== Federal Government response ===
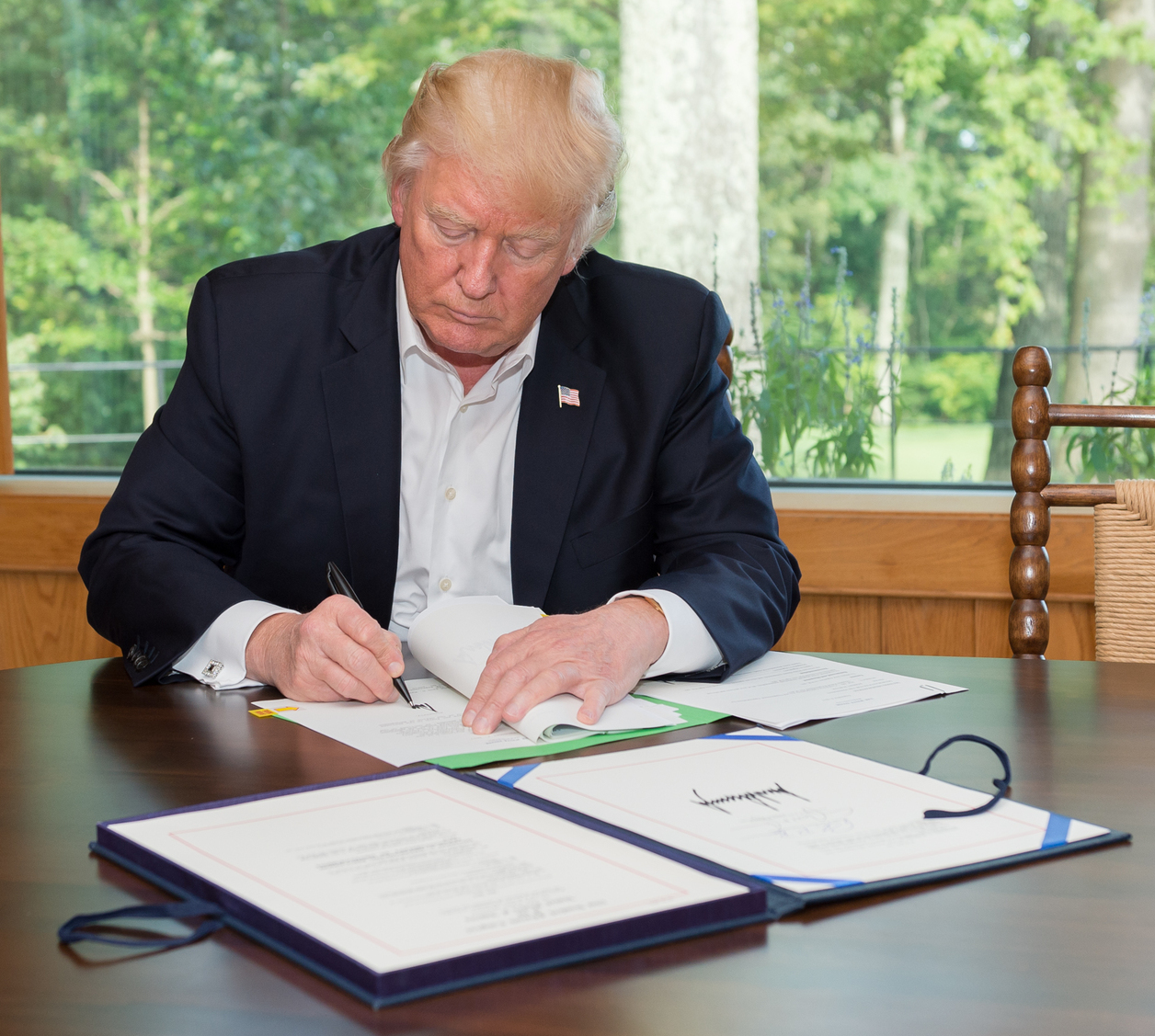
President Trump signs H.R. 601 into effect, providing $15 billion in disaster relief for hurricane victims.

On September 8, President Donald Trump signed into law H.R. 601, which among other spending actions designated $15 billion for Hurricane Harvey relief.

=== Non-governmental organization response ===
The American Red Cross, Salvation Army, United Methodist Committee on Relief (UMCOR), Gulf Coast Synod Disaster Relief, United States Equestrian Federation, Humane Society of the United States, Knights of Columbus, Samaritan's Purse, Catholic Charities USA, AmeriCares, Operation BBQ relief, many celebrities, and many other charitable organizations provided help to the victims of the storm. Anarchists (including Antifa) also provided relief. Business aviation played a part in the rescue efforts, providing support during the storm as well as relief flights bringing in suppliers in the immediate aftermath.

Volunteers from amateur radio's emergency service wing, the Amateur Radio Emergency Service, provided communications in American Red Cross shelters in South Texas.

Many corporations also contributed to relief efforts. Operation BBQ relief had the help from several local individuals and businesses kick off the support of providing meals for volunteers and victims. Smokers, pallets of wood, and another company came up with the pounds of pork to kick off the support effort. Although Operation BBQ relief has been in effect since May 2011 with the 2011 Joplin tornado, they estimate the Houston 2017 relief project to be their biggest ever.

Operation BBQ relief vendors volunteering for the Houston flood relief estimates that they will serve at least 450,000 meals. On August 27, 2017, it was estimated that Operation BBQ relief will be expecting 25,000 to 30,000 meals a day.

On August 27, 2017, KSL-TV, KSL Newsradio, FM100.3, and 103.5 The Arrow created a fundraiser to help Texas residents impacted by Hurricane Harvey. Because of an anonymous donor willing to match $2 for every $1 raised up to a total of $100,000, Peter Huntsman also agreed to match donations up to $100,000. The combined total of $200,000 was met by August 31, 2017. Their new goal is $1 million.

=== Foreign government response ===
Singapore dispatched Boeing CH-47 Chinook helicopters from the Republic of Singapore Air Force to areas affected by the hurricane for humanitarian operations, working alongside the Texas National Guard. Israel pledged $1 million in relief funds for restoration of non-state run communal infrastructure. Mexico sent volunteers from the Mexican Red Cross, firemen from Coahuila, and rescue teams from Guanajuato to Houston to assist in relief. Mexico later rescinded their commitment for aid after Hurricane Katia made landfall on Mexico's Gulf Coast, on September 9, 2017. Venezuela offered $5 million through the state-owned Citgo Petroleum, which operates a refinery in Corpus Christi.

=== Health and environmental hazards in flood waters ===
The floodwaters contain a number of hazards to the environment and human health. The Houston Health Department stated that "millions of contaminants" were present in floodwaters. These include E. coli and coliform bacteria; measurements of colony-forming units showed the concentrations were so high that there were risks of contracting flesh-eating disease from the water.

Houston officials stated that the Houston drinking water and sewer systems were intact; however, "hundreds of thousands of people across the 38 Texas counties affected by Hurricane Harvey use private wells, according to an estimate by Louisiana State University researchers, and those people must fend for themselves." Additionally, Harris County, which includes Houston, contains a large number of Superfund-designed brownfield sites that contain a wide variety of toxins and carcinogens. Two Superfund sites in Corpus Christi were flooded.

=== Baby boom ===
In the months after the hurricane struck, some hospitals in Texas saw a spike in birth rates, with a 17% increase in birth rates being reported at Corpus Christi Medical Center. Similarly, a large baby boom also occurred after Hurricane Sandy in 2012.

== Environmental factors ==
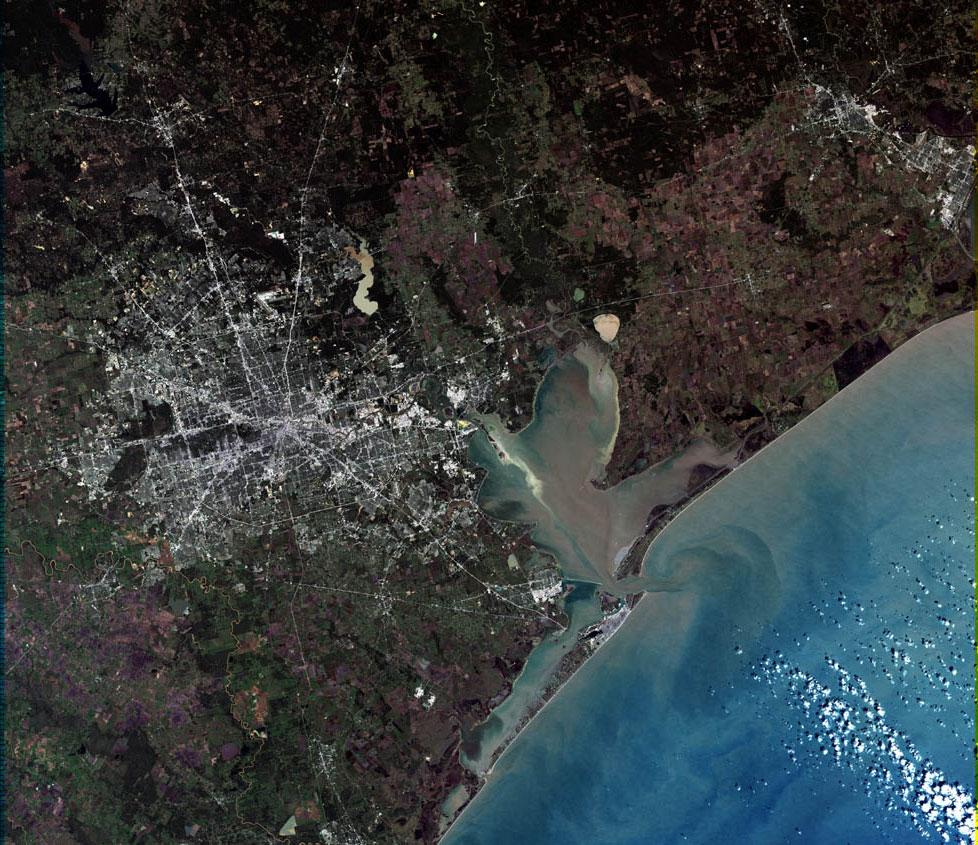
Houston's very flat topography makes flooding a problem. (Simulated-color image)

Houston is located in the southeastern United States on the Gulf Coastal Plain, and its clay-based soils provide poor drainage. The climate of Houston brings very heavy rainfall annually in between April and October, during the Texas Gulf Coast rainy season, together with tidal flood events, which have produced repeated floods in the city ever since its founding in 1836, though the flood control district founded in 1947, aided by the U.S. Army Corps of Engineers, managed to prevent statewide flooding for over 50 years. More recently, residents died in "historic flooding" in May 2015, and in the April 2016 "tax day floods". There is a tendency for storms to move very slowly over the region, allowing them to produce tremendous amounts of rain over an extended period, as occurred during Tropical Storm Claudette in 1979, and Tropical Storm Allison in 2001.

The area is a very flat flood plain at shallow gradient, slowly draining rainwater through an intricate network of channels and bayous to the sea. The main waterways, the San Jacinto River and the Buffalo Bayou, meander slowly, laden with mud, and have little capacity for carrying storm water.

=== Urban development ===
Houston has seen rapid urban development (urban sprawl), with absorbent prairie and wetlands replaced by hard surfaces which rapidly shed storm water, overwhelming the drainage capacity of the rivers and channels. Between 1992 and 2010, almost 25,000 acres (10,000 ha) of wetlands were lost, decreasing the detention capacity of the region by 4 billion US gal (15 billion L). However, Harvey was estimated to have dropped more than 15 trillion US gal (57 trillion L) of water in the area.

The Katy Prairie in western Harris County, which once helped to absorb floodwaters in the region, has been reduced to one quarter of its previous size in the last several decades due to suburban development, and one analysis discovered that more than 7,000 housing units have been built within the 100-year floodplain in Harris County since 2010.

In January 2025, the Local Drainage Program (LDP) needed help from outside contractors to fix drainage problems that were more complex than what their internal team could manage. The LDP's task was to provide advancement's to drainage networks so that they can provide adequate levels of drainage. The locations are nominated by maintenance sections when repairs exceed maintenance capabilities or require rehabilitation. LDP activities cover upgrading storm sewer systems and inlets, restoring curbs and roadsides, cleaning ditches and detention ponds, managing erosion, and conducting necessart regrading. The funding for the LDP is allotted with every fiscal year to be applied citywide. As of early 2025, the LDP was able to complete 78% projects, with the other 22% either under construction, screening, design, or nomination.

=== Subsidence ===
As Houston has expanded, rainwater infiltration in the region has lessened and aquifer extraction increased, causing the depletion of underground aquifers. When the saturated ground dries, the soil can be compressed and the land surface elevation decreases in a process called subsidence. Subsidence can also occur due to sediment settling. Specifically, regions to the north and west of the Houston metro have seen 10 to 25 millimetres (0.39 to 0.98 in) of subsidence per year. While oil extraction can cause subsidence, in the Houston-Galveston area, most oil has been extracted from sandstone that has relatively negligible ability to compress once oil has been removed. Thus, oil extraction has not resulted in significant subsidence. Further, the volume of oil extraction in the Houston area is too low to cause significant subsidence.

=== Climate change ===
The Gulf of Mexico is known for hurricanes in August, so their incidence alone cannot be attributed to global warming, but the warming climate does influence certain attributes of storms. Studies in this regard show that storms tend to intensify more rapidly prior to landfall. Weather events are due to multiple factors, and so cannot be said to be caused by one precondition, but climate change affects aspects of extreme events, and very likely worsened some of the impacts of Harvey. In a briefing, the World Meteorological Organization stated that the quantity of rainfall from Harvey had very likely been increased by climate change.

Harvey approached Houston over sea-surface waters which were significantly above average temperatures. Warm waters provide the main source of energy for hurricanes, and increased ocean heat can result in storms being larger, more intense and longer lasting, in particular bringing greatly increased rainfall. Sea level rise added to the resulting problems. According to officials from the Harris County Flood Control District, Harvey caused the third '500-year' flood in three years. The National Climate Assessment states:

The recent increases in activity are linked, in part, to higher sea surface temperatures in the region that Atlantic hurricanes form in and move through. Numerous factors have been shown to influence these local sea surface temperatures, including natural variability, human-induced emissions of heat-trapping gases, and particulate pollution. Quantifying the relative contributions of natural and human-caused factors is an active focus of research.

Warmer air can hold more water vapor, in accordance with the Clausius–Clapeyron relation, and there has been a global increase of daily rainfall records. Regional sea surface temperatures around Houston have risen around 0.5 °C (0.90 °F) in recent decades, which caused a 3–5% increase in moisture in the atmosphere. This had the effect of allowing Harvey to strengthen more than expected. The water temperature of the Gulf of Mexico was above average for this time of the year, and likely to be a factor in Harvey's impact. Within a week of Harvey, Hurricane Irma formed in the eastern Atlantic, due to the similar conditions involving unusually warm seawater. Some scientists fear this may be becoming a 'new normal'. Also higher sea-water temperatures can make hurricanes more devastating.

The slow movement of Harvey over Texas allowed the storm to drop prolonged heavy rains on the state, as has also happened with earlier storms. Harvey's stalled position was due to weak prevailing winds linked to a greatly expanded subtropical high pressure system over much of the US at the time, which had pushed the jet stream to the north. Research and model simulations have indicated an association between this pattern and human-caused climate change.

== See also ==
- List of Category 4 Atlantic hurricanes
- List of Texas hurricanes (1980–present)
- List of costliest Atlantic hurricanes
- List of wettest tropical cyclones
- 1900 Galveston hurricane
- Tropical Storm Imelda (2019)

== Notes ==
Preceded by Katrina (Currently tied)	Costliest Atlantic hurricanes on Record; 2017	Succeeded by None
