= Medio Creek =

Coordinates: 28.3138°N 97.3189°W

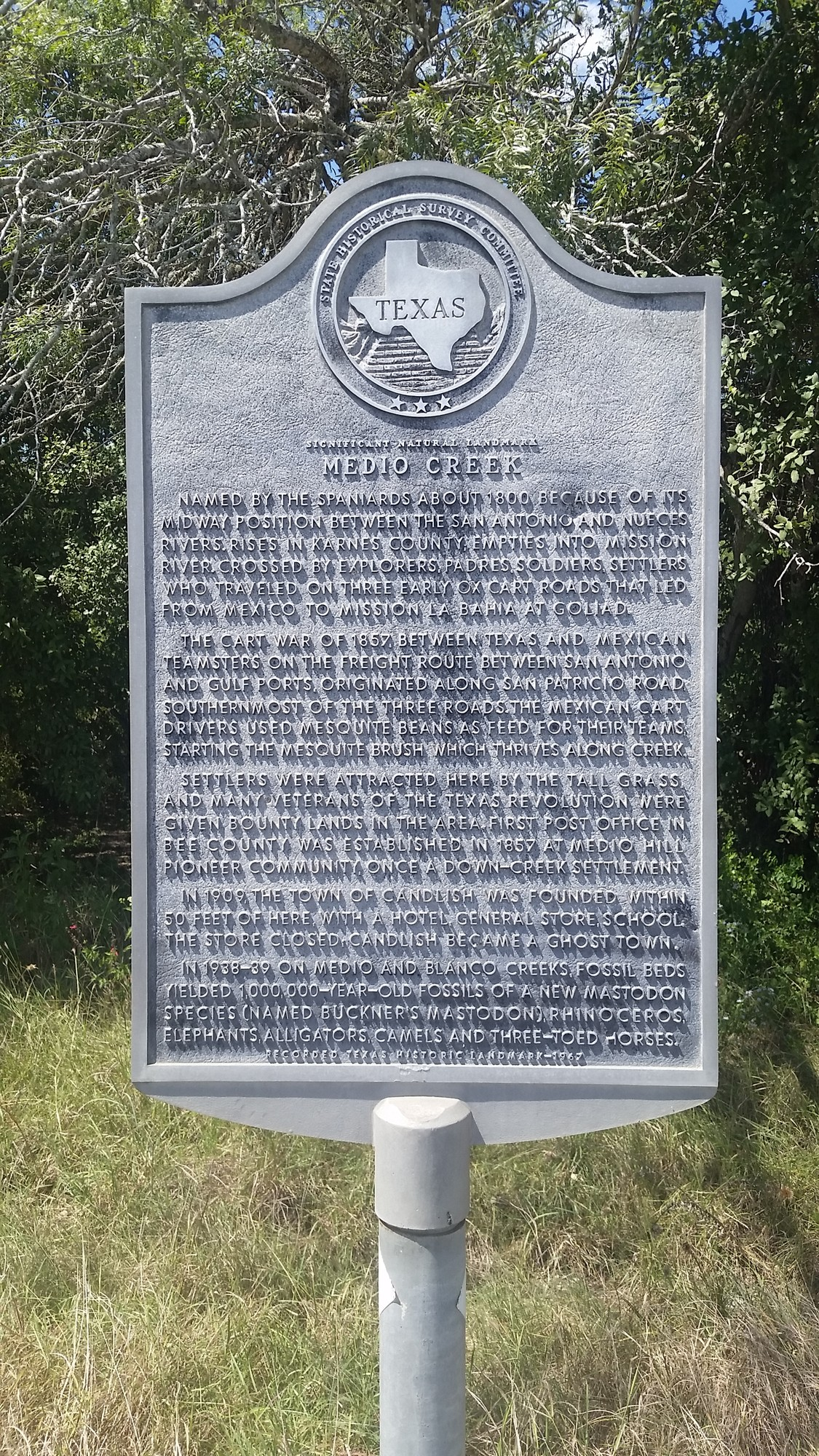
- Texas Historic Landmark marker for Medio Creek, beside a dry riverbed, US 59 about 4 miles NE of Beeville

Location
- Country: United States

Physical characteristics
- Source
  - location: Texas

Medio Creek is a river in Texas, that is a tributary of the Mission River.

== See also ==
- List of rivers of Texas
