= Mission River =

River in Refugio County, Texas, United States

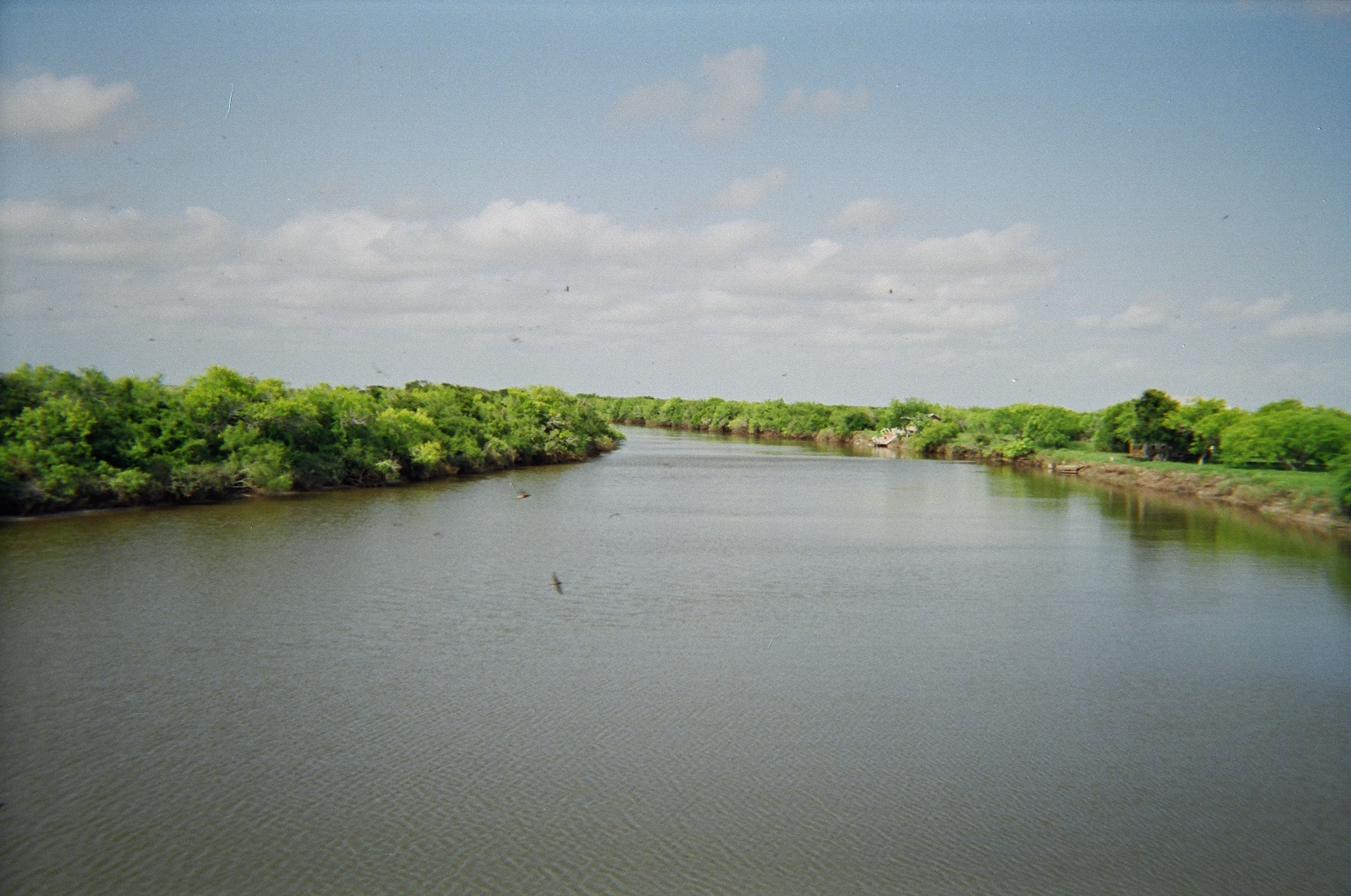
- View of Mission River from the FM 2678 bridge
- Map

Location
- Country: United States
- State: Texas
- Region: Refugio County

Physical characteristics
- Source confluence: Blanco Creek and Medio Creek
  - coordinates: 28°19′N 97°19′W
- Mouth: Copano Bay
  - coordinates: 28°09′53″N 97°10′18″W
- Length: 24 mi (39 km)

The Mission River is a river located in Texas, in the United States of America. It is formed by the confluence of Blanco Creek and Medio creeks in central Refugio County (at 28°19' N, 97°19' W) and runs southeast, past Refugio, for 24 miles (39 km) to its mouth on Mission Bay, an inlet of Copano Bay (at 28°10' N, 97°10' W). It traverses gently undulating coastal prairies surfaced by clay and loam and spotted by groves of hardwoods and pines. It is home to myriad waterfowl and native slough grasses.

== History ==
In 1795, Spanish friars relocated Nuestra Señora del Refugio Mission from a site near the junction of the Guadalupe River and San Antonio Rivers to the banks of the Mission River, a move that probably gave the river its name.

On March 14, 1836, during the Texas Revolution, a detachment of Texans under Amon B. King took a defensive position in one of the groves along the riverbank and repulsed repeated attacks of Mexican General José de Urrea's troops during the Battle of Refugio. Because the day's fighting nearly exhausted their supplies of gunpowder, King ordered his men to escape that night by swimming across the Mission River; they thus wetted the little powder that remained. The next day a party of Urrea's men overtook and captured King and his troops. The Texans were returned to the mission, where they were executed on March 16.

== See also ==
- List of rivers in Texas
