= Copano Bay =

Bay in Texas on the Gulf of Mexico fed by the two rivers and a creek

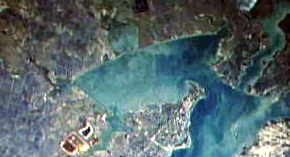

- Location within Texas
- Location: Texas Gulf Coast
- Coordinates: 28°07′12″N 97°06′38″W
- River sources: Aransas River, Copano Creek, Mission River
- Ocean/sea sources: Gulf of Mexico
- Basin countries: United States

Copano Bay is a northwestern extension of Aransas Bay, west of Rockport, Texas in Refugio and Aransas counties. It is supplied with seawater from the Gulf of Mexico via Aransas Bay, and fed freshwater from the Aransas River, Mission River and Copano Creek. As an estuary, the bay is home to a diverse ecosystem consisting of various birds including the endangered whooping crane, and numerous finfish including the redfish as well as shellfish such as oysters. It is classified as a nursery for shrimp, which prohibits production from the bay. Copano Bay is also a historic location for human usage and settlement that dates back to the 18th century, beginning with the historic port of El Copano and the 19th century settlements of St. Mary's of Aransas and Copano. The present-day towns of Bayside, Copano Village and Holiday Beach were all founded in the 20th century. Oil and natural gas are pumped from below the bay's surface, and contribute to the livelihood of the local economies. Recently, areas around the bay were affected by Hurricane Harvey which crossed over the bay as a Category 3 hurricane.

== History ==
Copano Bay was inhabited by the nomadic Aransas Indians, who constructed camps along the shore, 4,000 years ago. The Aransas people left the area approximately 700 years ago, and were replaced around 1400 CE by the Copane Indians, for whom the bay is named. The Copane were one of five groups making up the Karankawas, hunter-gatherers who occupied the mid-Texas coast.

Cabeza de Vaca is thought to have been the first European to sight the bay in the early 16th century, evidenced by the descriptions in his logs that match the detail of the area. Diego Ortiz Parrilla is believed to be the first European to explore the bay, doing so in 1766. He named it Santo Domingo (Saint Dominic), but it was later changed to Copano, after the port of Copano was officially opened in 1785 on the northwestern shore. The port later served as a strategically important locale during the Texas Revolution and the American Civil War, and was the site of a settlement that is now completely abandoned. The town of St. Mary's of Aransas was founded southwest of Copano and thrived as a port and wood mart, until numerous shipwrecks caused by the bay's hidden reefs concluded its use in 1875. Like Copano, it is now abandoned.

Further to the southwest, at the mouth of the Aransas River, the town of Black Point was established in the 1840s. The site was attacked by Indians several times before the settlement was abandoned. However, it was reestablished in the early 20th century as the present-day city of Bayside. Bayside developers aimed to attract fruit and vegetable growers to the plots made available and advertised nationwide, but large amounts of land were purchased by speculators, raising demand and forcing further annexation. The 2000 census reported that 360 people lived in the city. The cities of Fulton and Rockport were established on Aransas Bay in the late 19th century, and later expanded development along most of the eastern shore of Copano Bay. Such developments include Copano Village, which registered 210 residents in 2000, and the 1,000 resident Holiday Beach community just west of Goose Island State Park on Lamar Peninsula.

== Features ==
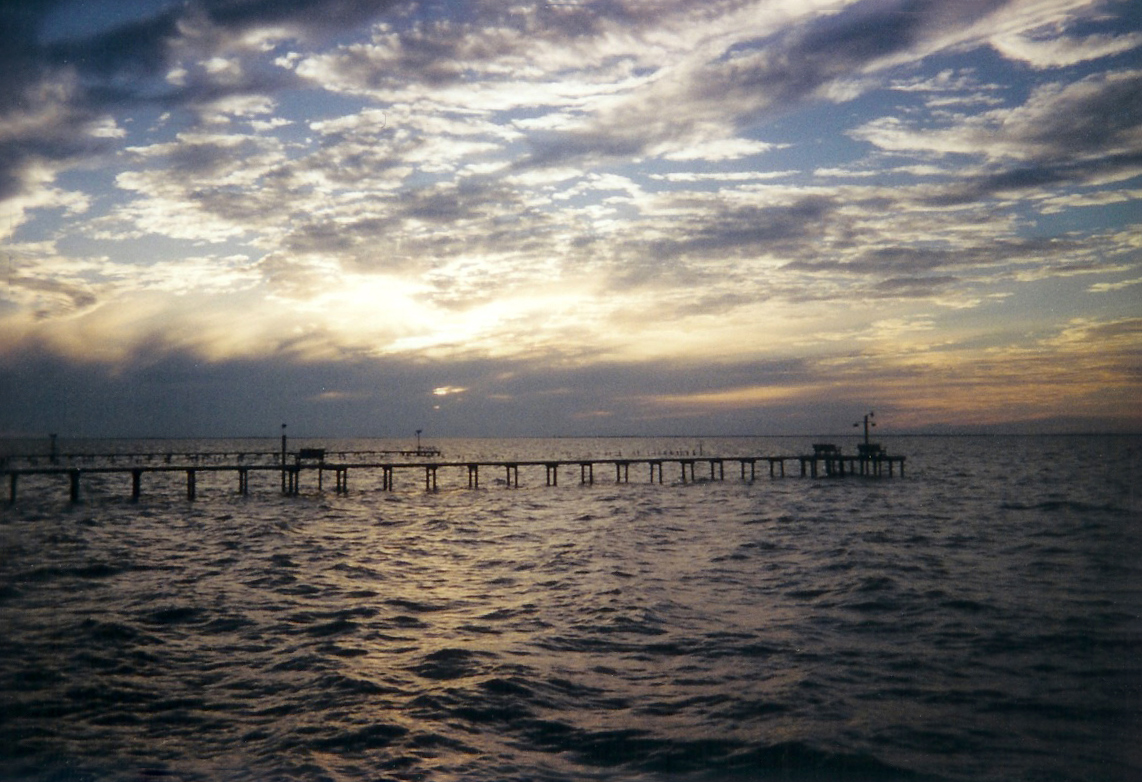
Piers off the eastern shore of Copano Bay with the shape of the bay on the horizon

Copano Bay is approximately twelve-by-six-miles, oriented from the southwest to the northeast. It is found mainly on undeveloped land, though ranches are located on parts of the west, south and north shores. The main extensions include Mission Bay, which stretches to the north to the mouth of the Mission River, and Port Bay to the west, which forms the southern boundary of the Live Oak peninsula. The peninsula is located on the eastern shore of Copano Bay and is lined with beach homes and residences, which begin just west of the inlet Salt Lake to the head of Live Oak peninsula at the confluence of Copano and Aransas Bay. This opening is spanned by the Copano Bay Causeway and the Copano Bay Fishing Pier, which once served as the main crossing to the Lamar peninsula. Holiday Beach is found on the northeastern shore of Copano Bay on the Lamar Peninsula. Just north of the community is the mouth of Copano Creek, which marks the bay's northernmost point. From here, the shoreline turns to the southwest past the Copano Bay Oil and Gas Field and four sloughs before reaching the ruins of the ghost town Copano at Copano Point, marked by white cliffs. At the point, the Copano Reef juts out almost halfway across the bay. Further southwest, past the mouth of Mission Bay, Bayside stretches along the coast to the mouth of the Aransas River. The shoreline turns to the southeast from this point, past the Egery Flats and Egery Island through Swan Lake and to the mouth of Port Bay.

The bay's maximum depth is 3 metres (9.8 ft), and in contrast to the Laguna Madre (approximately 80 miles down the coast to the south), is not hypersaline. The Mission and Aransas Rivers are the main freshwater sources: small rivers with deep banks that carve through a landscape lined with hardwood trees. Their inflows increase during significant rainfall and reach their seasonal highs during the autumn. These rivers have not been dammed and thus flow free. At both mouths, marshes covering several square miles stretch from the confluences with Copano Bay and forming several saline lakes.

== Ecosystem ==
Copano Bay serves as a nursery for shrimp, which attracts a large number of redfish. Abundant collections of black drum, flounder and trout, can also be found in the bay. Oysters grow in large numbers to form elongated reefs "oriented perpendicular to tidal flow" in the estuary. The reefs provide habitat for fish and sustenance for a wide variety of birds including the black-bellied whistling-duck, black-necked stilt, brown pelican, gull-billed tern, reddish egret, roseate spoonbill, seaside sparrow, white-faced ibis and the whooping crane. The dominant species of gastropod in the bay is Eulimastoma harbisonae.

In 2003, the United States Department of the Interior granted $574,000 to Texas Parks and Wildlife to purchase over 900 acres (3.6 km^{2}) of prime birding habitat at Egery Flats and the mouth of the Aransas River, to prevent further development.

== Industry ==
Oil and natural gas wells are located both onshore and offshore of Copano Bay. Three oil and natural gas fields are found on the bay, including the Copano Bay Oil and Gas Field, just west of Holiday Beach, the South Copano Bay Oil Field, just offshore from Bayside, and the West Fulton Beach Gas and Oil Field to the west of the Live Oak peninsula. In 1997, a pipeline owned by Koch Industries burst in the marsh in Refugio County, two miles (3 km) west of Copano Bay near the Aransas River, spilling 1,000 gallons of oil over a 10-acre (40,000 m^{2}) area. The oil did not seep into Copano Bay, preventing a minor environmental disaster. Copano Bay is off limits to shrimping due to its designation as a nursery bay.
