= Holiday Beach, Texas =

- CDP
- Interactive map of Holiday Beach, Texas
- Coordinates: 28°10′01″N 97°00′28″W
- Country: United States
- State: Texas
- County: Aransas

Area
  - Total: 1.9 sq mi (4.9 km^{2})
  - Land: 1.6 sq mi (4.1 km^{2})
  - Water: 0.3 sq mi (0.78 km^{2})

Population (2010)
  - Total: 514
  - Density: 320/sq mi (120/km^{2})
- Time zone: UTC-6 (Central (CST))
  - Summer (DST): UTC-5 (CDT)
- Zip Code: 78382
- FIPS code: 48-34478
- GNIS feature ID: 2586937

Holiday Beach is an unincorporated community and census-designated place in Aransas County, Texas, United States. As of the 2020 census, Holiday Beach had a population of 526. This was a new CDP for the 2010 census.

== Geography ==
Holiday Beach is situated on the eastern shore of Copano Bay along State Highway 35 in Aransas County, about 11 miles (18 km) northeast of Rockport.

According to the United States Census Bureau, the CDP has a total area of 1.9 square miles (4.9 km^{2}), of which 0.3 sq mi (0.78 km^{2}) is covered by water.

== History ==
Development of the area began in the mid-1960s, when a group of Dallas investors organized the Copano Land Company. The first lots were sold around 1964. The subdivision continued to develop, with waterfront homes and boat canals throughout the remainder of the 20th century. Holiday Beach was home to an estimated 1,000 residents in 2000.

In August 2017, Hurricane Harvey destroyed the area after making landfall in Holiday Beach.

== Subdivisions ==
Holiday Beach is divided into 12 subdivision sections: Bayview, Belaire, Hillcrest, Mesquite Tree, Newcomb Bend, Northview, Oak Shores, Palmetto Point, St. Charles, Sherwood Downs, Southview, and Woodland Hills.

== Demographics ==
Historical population
Census	Pop.	Note	%±
2010	514		—
2020	526		2.3%
U.S. Decennial Census; 1850–1900 1910; 1920 1930 1940; 1950 1960 1970; 1980 1990 2000; 2010 2020

Holiday Beach first appeared as a census designated place in the 2010 U.S. census.

Holiday Beach CDP, Texas – Racial and ethnic composition Note: the US Census treats Hispanic/Latino as an ethnic category. This table excludes Latinos from the racial categories and assigns them to a separate category. Hispanics/Latinos may be of any race.
Race / Ethnicity (NH = Non-Hispanic)	Pop 2010	Pop 2020	% 2010	% 2020
White alone (NH)	433	411	84.24%	78.14%
Black or African American alone (NH)	0	1	0.00%	0.19%
Native American or Alaska Native alone (NH)	0	4	0.00%	0.76%
Asian alone (NH)	2	4	0.39%	0.76%
Native Hawaiian or Pacific Islander alone (NH)	0	4	0.00%	0.76%
Other race alone (NH)	0	0	0.00%	0.00%
Mixed or multiracial (NH)	2	17	0.39%	3.23%
Hispanic or Latino (any race)	77	85	14.98%	16.16%
Total	514	526	100.00%	100.00%

== Education ==
Public education in the community of Holiday Lakes is provided by the Rockport-Fulton Independent School District.
