= Corpus Christi metropolitan area =

Corpus Christi
- Metropolitan statistical area
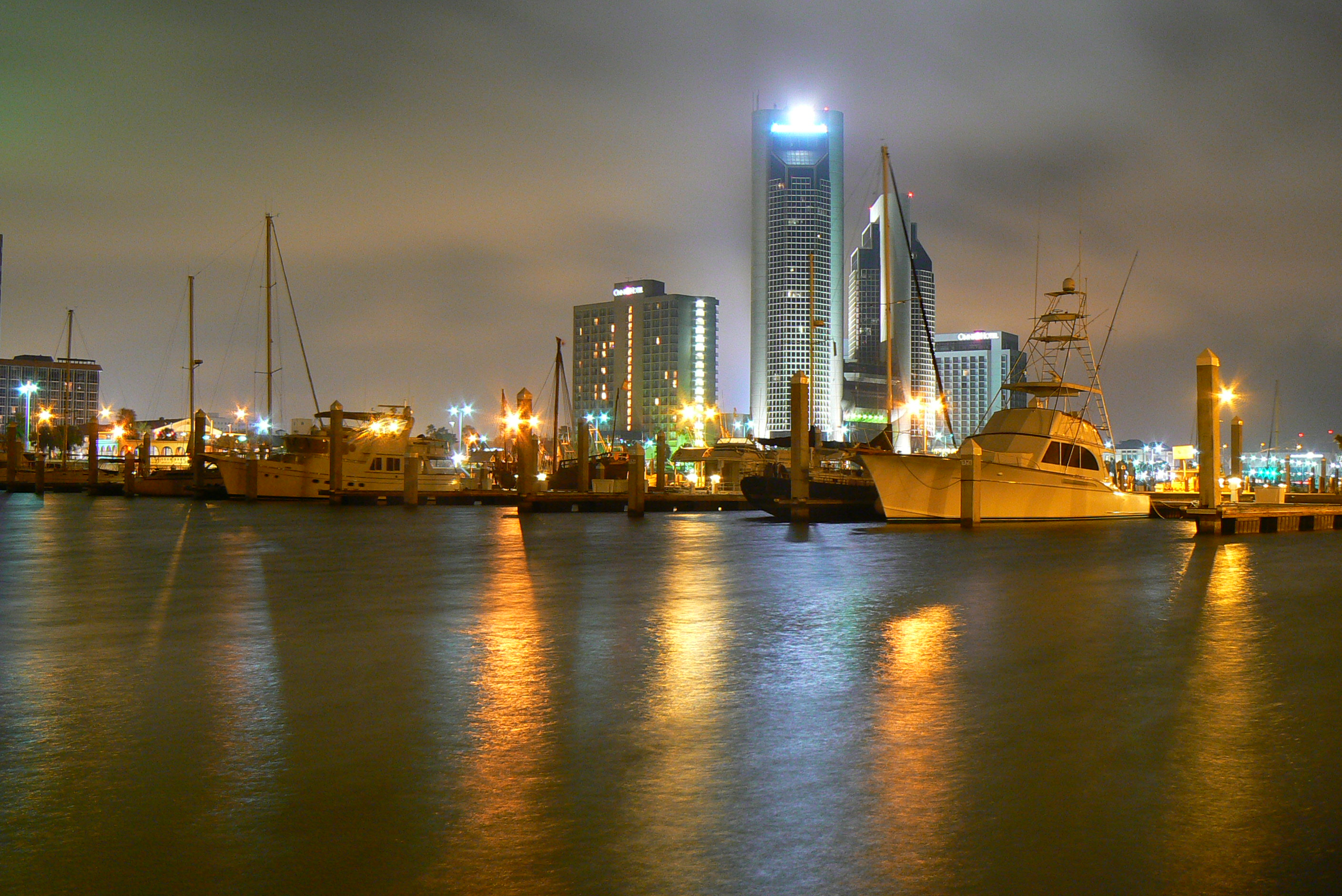
- Downtown Bayfront
Interactive Map of Corpus Christi–Kingsville–Alice, TX CSA
City of Corpus Christi
Corpus Christi MSA
Alice µSA
Kingsville µSA
- Country: United States
- State: Texas

Area
  - Metro: 1,530 sq mi (3,960 km^{2})

Population (2020)
  - Metropolitan statistical area: 445,823

GDP
  - Total: $28.228 billion (2022)
- Time zone: UTC-6 (CST)
  - Summer (DST): UTC-5 (CDT)

The Corpus Christi metropolitan statistical area is a metropolitan area in South Texas that covers three counties–Aransas, Nueces, and San Patricio. The population as of the 2024 census is 448,012.

== Counties ==
County	Seat	2025 estimate	2020 Census	Change	Land area	Density
Nueces	Corpus Christi	352,992	353,178	−0.05%	838 sq mi (2,170 km^{2})	421/sq mi (163/km^{2})
San Patricio	Sinton	72,053	68,755	+4.80%	693 sq mi (1,790 km^{2})	104/sq mi (40/km^{2})
Aransas	Rockport	26,146	23,830	+9.72%	252 sq mi (650 km^{2})	104/sq mi (40/km^{2})
Total		451,191	445,763	+1.22%	1,783 sq mi (4,620 km^{2})	253/sq mi (98/km^{2})

== Communities ==
=== Places with more than 300,000 people ===
- Corpus Christi (principal city)

=== Places with 10,000 to 20,000 people ===
- Portland
- Robstown
- Aransas Pass

=== Places with 1,000 to 10,000 people ===
- Bishop
- Gregory
- Ingleside
- Mathis
- Odem
- Port Aransas
- Sinton
- Taft Southwest
- Taft

=== Places with 500 to 1,000 people ===
- Del Sol-Loma Linda
- Driscoll
- Ingleside on the Bay
- Lake City
- Lakeshore Gardens-Hidden Acres
- North San Pedro
- St. Paul
- Spring Garden-Terra Verde

=== Places with less than 500 people ===
- Agua Dulce
- Doyle
- Edgewater-Paisano
- Edroy
- Falman-County Acres
- La Paloma-Lost Creek
- Lakeside
- Morgan Farm Area
- Petronila
- Rancho Banquete
- Rancho Chico
- San Patricio
- Sandy Hollow-Escondidas
- Tierra Grande
- Tradewinds
- Violet

== Demographics ==
Historical population
Census	Pop.	Note	%±
1900	10,439		—
1910	21,955		110.3%
1920	22,607		3.0%
1930	51,779		129.0%
1940	92,661		79.0%
1950	165,471		78.6%
1960	273,600		65.3%
1970	293,734		7.4%
1980	340,488		15.9%
1990	367,786		8.0%
2000	403,280		9.7%
2010	428,185		6.2%
2020	445,823		4.1%

As of the census of 2020, 445,823 people, 153,904 households, and 105,170 families residing within the MSA.The racial makeup of the MSA was 55.4% White (Non-Hispanic white 31.5%), 3.2% African American, 0.8% Native American, 2.0% Asian, 12.4% from other races, and 25.5% from two or more races. Hispanics or Latinos of any race were 60.5% of the population.

The median income for a household in the MSA was $33,682, and for a family was $38,661. Males had a median income of $31,433 versus $21,134 for females. The per capita income for the MSA was $17,007.

In 2022, the majority of the population was white and Hispanic/Latino, with 274,000 estimated to be white, and 270,000 estimated to be Hispanic/Latino. 105,000 people were estimated to be two or more races. 14,200 were estimated to be Black, and 8,200 were estimated to be Asian.

== Economy ==
The Corpus Christi Metropolitan area has lots of exports like grain sorghums,cotton, and wheat. Since it is near the Gulf of Mexico, they have lots of coastal shipments like fuel oils, gasoline, crude petroleum, and natural gas. The Port of Corpus Christi handled $88.6 billion in exports in 2024. Mineral fuels were the port’s largest export category, accounting for about $80 billion of that total. This area has become the center of a large petroleum and petrochemical industry. Other major benefits are petroleum and natural gas, manufacturing, and agricultural fishing.

== Culture ==
Corpus Christi and the surrounding region is culturally strong and diverse, offers education opportunities, and tropical climates, the area also offers many recreational facilities. The Art Museum of South Texas offers exhibitions and educational programs, while festivals include Buccaneer Days and the Texas Jazz Festival. The area also influences the local food, music and community celebration. It also has a variety of museums, theaters, galleries and public art. Another huge impact on the culture is music because of famous music artist Selena Quintanilla-Pérez, whose family moved to Corpus Christi in 1982. The family later established the Selena Museum in the city in 1998, influencing the Tejano music history.

== History and development ==
The development of Corpus Christi’s Deepwater ports helps the city’s growth and economy develop. As Christopher Long’s article, The port officially opened on September 14, 1926, seven years after the 1919 hurricane. During the twentieth century, port development, petrochemical industries, and military installations helped shape Corpus Christi’s position as an important urban center in the metropolitan area.

Between 1920 and 1970, the advent in quick succession of a deep- water port, petrochemical industries, and military bases propelled Corpus Christi to a position among Texas's largest Cities. In 1926, on September 14th, seven years after the hurricane the metropolitan area celebrated the opening of its Deepwater port. Then starting in the 1960s, planning and economic studies expressed anxiety about the potential stagnation of Corpus Christi's traditional industries. This is what caused most of the attraction in the metropolitan area due to the booming industries and the port trading.

== Geography and coastal Region ==
The Corpus Christi metropolitan area is located in the Coastal Bend of Texas. It includes 11 counties and is characterized by barrier islands, lakes and bays. It is a functional region consisting of a densely populated urban core surrounded by outskirts, towns, and connected communities. The region attracts tourists, industries, communities, and other countries for trade. Even though the metropolitan area is a beautiful costal region there are main concerns as to sea level rise, droughts, potholes, sinking areas, and water shortage. To protect the geography and the community of the metropolitan area the people need to be informed of what is happening, how serious it is, and how we can prevent or help it from contributing to our future children and adults.

The Corpus Christi metropolitan area is a wealthy region. It offers many opportunities and investments such as education opportunities for children, pleasant weather and land views, strong communities, great healthcare and affordable living. Corpus Christi has historically had the lowest cost of living compared to other U.S cities. Aside from everything that the metropolitan area offers, Corpus Christi is one of the major healthcare centers in the U.S concluding four major hospital chains which connects it to Mexico and Latin America.

== See also ==
- List of cities in Texas
- Texas census statistical areas
- List of Texas metropolitan areas
