= Texas State Highway 234 =

Highway in Texas

State Highway 234
- SH 234, highlighted in red

Route information
- Maintained by TxDOT
- Length: 6.416 mi (10.326 km)
- Existed: 1936–present

Major junctions
- West end: I-37 in Edroy
- East end: Future I-69E / US 77 in Odem

Location
- Country: United States
- State: Texas
- Counties: San Patricio

Highway system
- Highways in Texas; Interstate; US; State; Former; Toll; Loops; Spurs; FM/RM; Park; Rec
| ← SH 233 | → SH 235 |

State Highway 234 (SH 234) is a short state highway connecting Edroy and Odem in San Patricio County, Texas.

== Route description ==
SH 234 begins in Edroy, at I-37 southbound's exit 22; the roadway north of this interchange is designated FM 796. The route travels south into central Edroy before turning to the east, where it intersects the frontage road of northbound I-37's exit 22. The highway continues to the east before turning to the southeast, becoming Main Street in Odem. The SH 234 designation ends at US 77; the roadway beyond this intersection is designated FM 631.

== History ==
The route was designated on August 1, 1936 along its current route.

== Major intersections ==
The entire route is in San Patricio County.

| Location | mi | km | Destinations | Notes |
|---|---|---|---|---|
| Edroy | 0.0 | 0.0 | I-37 – San Antonio, Corpus Christi | Western terminus; roadway continues as FM 796 |
| Edroy | 0.8 | 1.3 | I-37 to FM 796 | Access to I-37 northbound frontage road only |
| Odem | 6.4 | 10.3 | US 77 (Future I-69E) – Robstown, Sinton | Eastern terminus; roadway continues as FM 631; U.S. 77 is the future Interstate 69E |
1.000 mi = 1.609 km; 1.000 km = 0.621 mi
