= KZAI =

Air1 radio station in Balcones Heights, Texas

- Balcones Heights, Texas; United States
- Broadcast area: Greater San Antonio
- Frequency: 103.7 MHz (HD Radio)

Programming
- Language: English
- Format: Christian worship music
- Subchannels: HD2: K-Love; HD3: Radio Nueva Vida
- Network: Air1

Ownership
- Owner: Educational Media Foundation
- Sister stations: KZLV, KZAR

History
- First air date: May 20, 1968 (as KCTA-FM in Sinton)
- Former call signs: KCTA-FM (1967–1970); KOUL (1970–2013); KXAI (2013–2021)
- Call sign meaning: Contains AI for "Air1"

Technical information
- Licensing authority: FCC
- Facility ID: 7084
- Class: A
- ERP: 2,300 watts
- HAAT: 119 meters (390 ft)
- Transmitter coordinates: 29°26′29.9″N 98°30′22.8″W
- Translator: 92.7 K224EH (Victoria)

Links
- Public license information: Public file; LMS
- Webcast: Listen Live; Listen Live (HD2)
- Website: air1.com klove.com nuevavida.com (HD3)

KZAI (103.7 FM) is a radio station broadcasting a Christian worship music format through the nationally programmed Air1 network. The station is licensed to Balcones Heights, Texas, United States, and serves the San Antonio area. The transmitter is located in San Antonio proper, due north of downtown and adjacent to Interstate 10. KZAI is owned by the Educational Media Foundation.

Originally a station in the Corpus Christi area, the station moved in 2021 as part of a facilities shuffle that moved a third EMF signal into San Antonio (alongside existing K-Love outlet KZLV and rimshot Air1 outlet KZAR). The former 103.7 facilities and KXAI call sign were moved to another license, leaving Air1 programming seamlessly available to Corpus Christi-area listeners.

== History ==
The KZAI license went on the air as KCTA-FM 103.3, a 100,000-watt FM station licensed to Sinton, on May 20, 1968. Owned by the Broadcasting Company of the Southwest alongside its Corpus Christi station KCTA (1030 AM), the station broke from simulcasting its daytime-only AM partner and became country outlet KOUL on October 2, 1970. An agreement was reached to sell KOUL to J. W. Brauer in 1975, but the two parties mutually agreed to dismiss the sale attempt on February 12, 1976. KOUL moved to 103.7 MHz in the early 1980s as part of a multi-city allocation shuffle to resolve a conflict involving allocations in Freeport, and in 2005, it was approved to change its city of license from Sinton to Refugio in a move designed to allowed KTKY to upgrade its own facility.

In 1997, Broadcast Corporation of the Southwest sold its three Corpus Christi FM stations and one AM to Harpole Broadcast Holdings of Texas in a $5.2 million transaction. Harpole sold the three FMs to Texrock Radio the next year for $7 million. 2001 saw another sale of the FMs, this time to Rodriguez Communications for $6.5 million.

=== Sale to EMF and 2020 move to San Antonio ===
On April 5, 2013, Tejas Broadcasting, which had become the owner of KOUL and other stations in 2004, announced it would sell KOUL to the Educational Media Foundation for $1.25 million; the deal included a $500,000 loan to Tejas that allowed it to build out two construction permits on its other stations in the market and perform deferred maintenance on the KOUL facility. On May 3, 2013, KOUL dropped its longtime country format and began broadcasting Air1 programming, with new KXAI call letters instituted. Tejas would later exit broadcasting by selling one of those stations, KMJR (licensed to Odem), to EMF in 2019 for $432,000.

With EMF in control of KMJR and KXAI, the company saw an opportunity. In partnership with Emmis Communications, owner of KBPA in the Austin market, a series of applications were filed. KXAI would move from Refugio to a new city of license, Balcones Heights, and broadcast with 4,300 watts of power—a relocation into the heart of the San Antonio metropolitan area, giving EMF a city-grade signal in San Antonio. To make the move possible, Emmis' KBPA would slightly downgrade its facility. Meanwhile, KMJR at 98.3 would move to 103.7 using KXAI's antenna. In January 2020, the relocation and other facilities changes were approved by the Federal Communications Commission. In April 2021, EMF filed a modification to the construction permit, reducing the proposed output slightly to the final 2.3 kW but from a tower site closer to the city core.

On June 7, 2021, 103.7 began broadcasting from its new transmitter under the new call sign KZAI, completing the move to San Antonio. The same day, EMF filed for KZAI's license to cover, which the FCC granted two days later. The former KZLR (previously KMJR) then became the new KXAI and took on the 103.7 technical facilities and Air1 programming for Corpus Christi.

The move displaced KAHL (AM) translator K279AB from 103.7 to 107.9 under the new call sign K300DY. The move happened concurrently with the sign-on of KZAI.
