= KXAI =

Air 1 radio station in Odem–Corpus Christi, Texas

- Odem, Texas; United States
- Broadcast area: Corpus Christi metropolitan area
- Frequency: 103.7 MHz

Programming
- Format: Christian worship music
- Network: Air 1

Ownership
- Owner: Educational Media Foundation
- Sister stations: KPLV

History
- First air date: April 2, 1985
- Former call signs: KXTO (1985–1988); KKHQ (1988–1996); KLHB (1996–2010); KMJR (2010–2020); KZLR (2020–2021)
- Former frequencies: 98.3 MHz (1985–2021)

Technical information
- Licensing authority: FCC
- Facility ID: 12170
- Class: C1
- ERP: 82,000 watts
- HAAT: 280 meters (920 ft)
- Transmitter coordinates: 28°02′07″N 97°26′11″W

Links
- Public license information: Public file; LMS
- Website: air1.com

KXAI (103.7 FM) is a non-commercial radio station broadcasting the Air 1 Christian worship music network. Licensed to Odem, Texas, United States, the station serves the Corpus Christi area and is owned by the Educational Media Foundation.

== History ==
On April 2, 1985, KXTO signed on at 98.3 MHz. The station, initially operating as a 3,000-watt outlet, was originally owned by Capi Spanish Broadcasting and aired a bilingual format of Spanish-language, oldies and top 40 music. The KXTO call letters were switched to KKHQ on January 29, 1988.

By the early 1990s, Capi was bankrupt. In 1991, the station was listed as having been silent at least six months; The station remained in bankruptcy until Coastal Digital Broadcasting, owned by Harry Sherwood, Jack Buck and Michael Mintz, acquired it for just $72,000 in 1992. Coastal Digital resurrected KKHQ as an album-oriented rock outlet.

In 1996, the station changed its call letters to KLHB, branding as "Club 98.3" and carrying a Tejano format. It exited Tejano in 2009 when it flipped to Spanish oldies under the "Recuerdo" moniker. Tejas Broadcasting bought KLHB and other stations in 2004 in a multi-city, multi-station group deal for $20 million. The call letters changed to KMJR in 2010 when the station took the name "La Mejor"; it remained in the Regional Mexican format but eventually changed monikers to "La Caliente".

=== Sale to EMF ===
In 2018, Tejas Broadcasting began selling its broadcast properties. KMJR was sold in December 2018 to the Educational Media Foundation for $432,000, giving EMF its third signal in the market and resulting in its flip to Radio Nueva Vida, an independently owned Spanish-language Christian radio network aired on some EMF-owned signals.

KMJR, however, would serve to play a larger role in a complex modification plan. With EMF in control of KMJR and KXAI (103.7 FM)—which had previously been KMJR's sister station until it was sold in 2013—the foundation saw an opportunity. In partnership with Emmis Communications, owner of KBPA in the Austin market, a series of applications were filed. KMJR would move to 103.7 MHz and broadcast with 75,000 watts, assuming the antenna of KXAI, which would remain on 103.7 but move into the heart of the San Antonio metropolitan area, placing a city-grade signal over San Antonio. To make the move possible, Emmis's KBPA would slightly downgrade its facility. In January 2020, the relocation and other facilities changes were approved by the Federal Communications Commission. The call letters were changed to KZLR on October 13, 2020.

On May 25, 2021, KZLR changed its call sign to KXAI. The frequency changes took place in June 2021, with KXAI taking on the 103.7 technical facilities and Air 1 programming. The old KXAI became KZAI and moved toward San Antonio.
