= Del sol =

Del Sol or del Sol may refer to:

- Del Sol, Texas, a census-designated place in Texas
- Del Sol-Loma Linda, Texas, a former census-designated place in Texas
- Del Sol High School, a high school in Las Vegas, Nevada
- Del Sol High School (California), a high school in Oxnard, California
- Del Sol Press, a publishing company
- Del Sol metro station, a station in Santiago, Chile
- Luis del Sol, former Spanish footballer
- Honda CR-X del Sol, a two-seat, targa top convertible manufactured by Honda in the 1990s
- Del Sol Quartet, a San Francisco-based string quartet

== See also ==
- Del Ser
- Delsatia
