= Odem High School =

Public school in Texas, United States

Coordinates: 27.9487°N 97.5911°W

Location
- 1 Owl Square; Odem, San Patricio, Texas 78370; United States

Information
- Type: Public high school
- Motto: Odem Fight, Never Dies
- Established: 1911
- School district: Odem-Edroy Independent School District
- Principal: Lisa Flores
- Grades: 9-12
- Enrollment: 273 (2024-2025)
- Colors: Blue, Gold, & White
- Fight song: Jalisco
- Athletics conference: UIL Class AAA
- Mascot: Owl
- Nickname: Scrappin' Owls
- Rival: Taft High School (Texas)
- Yearbook: 'The Owl'
- Website: ohs.oeisd.org

Odem High School is a public high school located in the city of Odem, Texas, in San Patricio County, United States and classified as a 3A school by the UIL. It is a part of the Odem-Edroy Independent School District located in east central San Patricio County. In 2015, the school was rated "Met Standard" by the Texas Education Agency.

== Athletics ==
Odem competes in the following sports -

- Football
- Volleyball
- Boys & Girls Cross Country
- Boys & Girls Basketball
- Baseball
- Softball
- Boys & Girls Tennis
- Boys & Girls Golf
- Boys & Girls Track & Field
- Boys & Girls Powerlifting

=== State Titles ===
- Baseball
  - 1984 (3A)
- Golf
  - 1965 Bill Evans (1A)
- High Jump
  - 1987 Tara Rhyne (3A)
- Powerlifting
  - 2025 Breanna Palmer (3A)

=== Football ===
Odem High School quarterback Michael Everett is 4th all time in the state of Texas in career passing yards and 4th all time in career passing touchdowns. The Owls football team has never made it to the state championship, but they have made it to the state semi-finals in 2002 and to the regional finals in 1967, 2002, and 2014.

=== Golf ===
Odem High School has one individual state championship in Golf. Bill Evans went on to play golf at Texas A&I University (now Texas A&M University-Kingsville) where he led the team that won the 1969 Lone Star Conference title. Evans was the team's regional medalist. Evans would eventually place 4th at the national meet, and the Texas A&I Javelinas would finish 8th. Evans is in the Texas A&M University-Kingsville Javelina Hall of Fame, along with the 1969 men's golf team.

== Band ==
"The Spirit of OHS", the Odem High School Marching Band has received 20 straight consecutive UIL sweepstakes from 2005-2025, making it the longest active streak of a 3A marching band in South Texas. The marching band also achieved success in the late 1960's and throughout the 1970's. Having a long streak of superior ratings during those years. The Spirit of OHS has also made it to the UIL State Marching Band Contest three times in their history. Those times being in 2013, 2017, and 2019. The concert band also has had a past of success. They have been a TMEA State Honor Band Semi-Finalist in 2019. Students in the Odem High School band also participate in the tryouts for the All-State Band and the All-State Jazz Band. Many students from Odem have made it to the All-State Band. The Odem High School bandmembers also compete in the solo & ensemble competition with many students advancing to the state contest and receiving superior ratings. One student has also received the outstanding performer award in 2025 at the state solo & ensemble contest.

== Academic Competitions ==
Odem High School competes in many different UIL Academic Events. They are the 2024, 2025, and 2026 District 29 3A champions. They have only had one team qualify for the state contest, that being the current issues & events team in 2025, but they have had many different individual qualifiers.

=== Current Issues & Events ===
- 2025 Region 4 Champions
- 2025 State Qualifiers
