= Sinton High School =

Public school in Texas, United States

Location
- 400 N. Pirate Blvd; Sinton, Texas 78387; United States; 28.0406°N 97.4967°W

Information
- Type: Public high school
- School district: Sinton Independent School District
- Principal: Reynaldo Saenz
- Teaching staff: 46.60 (FTE)
- Grades: 9-12
- Enrollment: 601 (2023-2024)
- Student to teacher ratio: 12.90
- Colors: Maroon and white
- Athletics conference: UIL Class AAAA
- Mascot: Pirate
- Rival: Rockport-Fulton High School
- Website: www.sintonisd.net/shs

Sinton High School is a public high school located in Sinton, Texas, United States, and classified as a 4A school by the UIL. It is part of the Sinton Independent School District located in San Patricio County.

As the sole comprehensive high school of this district, its boundary includes Sinton, Del Sol, La Paloma Addition, Morgan Farm (formerly Morgan Farm Area), Rancho Chico, Sodville, and St. Paul.

== Athletics ==
Sinton compete in these sports -

- Football
- Boys & girls basketball
- Volleyball
- Baseball
- Softball
- Boys & girls tennis
- Boys & girls track & field
- Boys & girls cross country
- Boys & girls golf

=== State Titles ===
- Baseball
  - 2022(4A)
  - 2001(3A)
  - 1989(3A)
  - 1988(3A)
- Basketball
  - 1996(3A)

== Notable alumni ==
- Blake Mitchell (baseball) - 2023 1st Round Draft Pick by the Kansas City Royals
- Anthony Banda - MLB pitcher for the Los Angeles Dodgers
- Mike Adams - former MLB relief pitcher for the Texas Rangers, San Diego Padres, Philadelphia Phillies, and Milwaukee Brewers
