= Loma Linda, Texas =

- Census-designated place
- Interactive map of Loma Linda, Texas
- Coordinates: 28°0′25″N 97°29′58″W
- Country: United States
- State: Texas
- County: San Patricio

Area
  - Total: 1.3 sq mi (3.4 km^{2})
  - Land: 1.3 sq mi (3.4 km^{2})
  - Water: 0.0 sq mi (0 km^{2})

Population (2010)
  - Total: 122
  - Density: 94/sq mi (36/km^{2})
- Time zone: UTC-6 (Central (CST))
  - Summer (DST): UTC-5 (CDT)
- Zip Code: 78387

Loma Linda is a census-designated place (CDP) in San Patricio County, Texas, United States. As of the 2020 census, Loma Linda had a population of 149. Prior to the 2010 census, Loma Linda was part of the Del Sol-Loma Linda CDP.

== Geography ==
Loma Linda is located at 28°0′25″N 97°29′58″W (28.007011, -97.499402).

== Demographics ==
Historical population
Census	Pop.	Note	%±
2010	122		—
2020	149		22.1%
U.S. Decennial Census; 1850–1900 1910; 1920 1930 1940; 1950 1960 1970; 1980 1990 2000; 2010 2020

Loma Linda first appeared as a census designated place in the 2010 U.S. census, one of three CDPs (along with Del Sol CDP and La Paloma Addition CDP) split out from the deleted Del Sol-Loma Linda CDP.

=== 2020 census ===
Loma Linda CDP, Texas – Racial and ethnic composition Note: the US Census treats Hispanic/Latino as an ethnic category. This table excludes Latinos from the racial categories and assigns them to a separate category. Hispanics/Latinos may be of any race.
Race / Ethnicity (NH = Non-Hispanic)	Pop 2010	Pop 2020	% 2010	% 2020
White alone (NH)	30	38	24.59%	25.50%
Black or African American alone (NH)	6	2	4.92%	1.34%
Native American or Alaska Native alone (NH)	0	0	0.00%	0.00%
Asian alone (NH)	0	0	0.00%	0.00%
Native Hawaiian or Pacific Islander alone (NH)	0	1	0.00%	0.67%
Other race alone (NH)	0	0	0.00%	0.00%
Mixed race or Multiracial (NH)	1	2	0.82%	1.34%
Hispanic or Latino (any race)	85	106	69.67%	71.14%
Total	122	149	100.00%	100.00%

== Education ==
It is in the Sinton Independent School District. The district's comprehensive high school is Sinton High School.

Del Mar College is the designated community college for all of San Patricio County.
