= Angelita, Texas =

Ghost town in Texas, US

- Ghost town
- Location in Texas
- Coordinates: 27.92179000°N 97.61286300°W
- Country: United States
- State: Texas
- County: San Patricio

Angelita is a ghost town in San Patricio County, Texas, United States. The settlement was established by John James Welder, as a farming community, after the construction of the St. Louis, Brownsville and Mexico Railway in 1904. The area was platted by W. M. Spessard, and a post office opened on April 30, 1907; it operated until June 1916, when it was moved to Odem. The growth of Odem caused Angelita to decline and most residents moved, with the town being abandoned in 1914.
