= St. Paul, Texas =

St. Paul is the name of some places in the U.S. state of Texas:

- St. Paul, Collin County, Texas
- St. Paul, Falls County, Texas
- St. Paul, Limestone County, Texas
- St. Paul, San Patricio County, Texas
