= Allendale, San Patricio County, Texas =

Ghost town in Texas, US

Coordinates: 27.924°N 97.175°W

Allendale is a ghost town in San Patricio County, Texas, United States. Established in the 19th century, it is named for settler George Allen. A school operated there from the 1870s to the 1910s, and the community disappeared following the school's closure. It was renamed Millsville in the early 20th century.
