= KYRK =

Radio station in Taft, Texas

- Taft, Texas; United States
- Broadcast area: Corpus Christi metropolitan area
- Frequency: 106.5 MHz
- Branding: 106.5 BANDTANGO Radio

Programming
- Format: Alternative rock

Ownership
- Owner: Withers Family Texas Holdings, LP

History
- First air date: 1996 (as KZTX at 106.1)
- Former call signs: KZTX (1984–1998); KTKY (1998–2011)
- Former frequencies: 106.1 MHz (1996–2011)

Technical information
- Licensing authority: FCC
- Facility ID: 40798
- Class: C2
- ERP: 50,000 watts
- HAAT: 148 meters (486 ft)
- Transmitter coordinates: 27°52′2.00″N 97°13′7.00″W

Links
- Public license information: Public file; LMS
- Webcast: Listen Live
- Website: BANDTANGORadio.com

KYRK (106.5 FM) is a commercial radio station licensed to Taft, Texas, and serving the Corpus Christi metropolitan area. It airs an alternative rock format and is owned by Withers Family Texas Holdings, LP. It uses the moniker "Bandtango," a brand and sound image concept of Mike Quinn and Bandtango Inc., a Los Angeles entertainment technology company.

KYRK is a Class C2 station with an effective radiated power (ERP) of 50,000 watts. The transmitter is on Avenue B near 8th Street in Ingleside.

== History ==
The station was assigned the call letters KZTX on September 5, 1984. On March 20, 1998, the station changed its call sign to KTKY. On April 26, 2011, the station changed its call sign to the current KYRK. The station moved to 106.5 FM with 50,000 watts on July 15, 2011.

On October 9, 2014, KYRK flipped from classic hits to an alternative rock format, branded as "106.5 The Shark".

On May 3, 2015, the "Shark" alternative rock format moved to 94.7 in Corpus Christi, and the 106.5 frequency fell silent.

On May 20, 2015, 106.5 KYRK adopted 94.7's previous country music format as "Rig Radio 106.5".

On July 22, 2015, KYRK returned to its "Shark" alternative rock format.

On August 10, 2021, KYRK relaunched under the new brand "106.5 BANDTANGO Radio New Alternative First" an alternative music format.
