= Blake Mitchell (baseball) =

American baseball player (born 2004)

Kansas City Royals
- Catcher
- Born: August 3, 2004 (age 22); Houston, Texas, U.S.
- Bats: Left Throws: Right
Medals
Men's baseball
Representing United States
U-18 Baseball World Cup
Gold medal – first place	2022 Sarasota-Bradenton	Team

Blake Austin Mitchell (born August 3, 2004) is an American professional baseball catcher in the Kansas City Royals organization. He was selected with the eighth overall pick in the 2023 Major League Baseball draft.

== Amateur career ==
Mitchell grew up in Sinton, Texas and attended Sinton High School. As a junior, he was named the Texas Player of the Year after batting .465 with 17 doubles, seven home runs, and 52 RBIs as Sinton won the Class 4A State Championship. After the season, Mitchell was selected to play in the MLB and USA Baseball All-American Game. He was also named to the roster for the United States national baseball team to compete in the 2022 U-18 Baseball World Cup. He earned the win in the gold medal game after pitching 2 2/3 scoreless innings in relief. As a senior, Mitchell repeated as the Gatorade Player of the Year.

Mitchell committed to play college baseball at LSU.

== Professional career ==
Mitchell was selected by the Kansas City Royals with the eighth overall pick of the 2023 Major League Baseball draft. On July 15, 2023, he signed with the Royals for $4.9 million. He made his professional debut with the rookie-level Arizona Complex League Royals, appearing in 13 games. Mitchell was assigned to the Single-A Columbia Fireflies to begin the 2024 season and was promoted to the High-A Quad Cities River Bandits near the season's end. Over 111 games for the season, Mitchell batted .232 with 18 home runs, 51 RBIs, and 26 stolen bases.

On February 23, 2025, it was announced that Mitchell would miss at least 4-6 weeks after undergoing surgery to repair a fractured right hamate bone. Mitchell returned to play in May on a rehab assignment before being assigned to Quad Cities. Across 49 games with Quad Cities, Mitchell hit .207 with two home runs, 12 RBIs, and seven doubles. After the season, he played in the Arizona Fall League with the Surprise Saguaros. He returned to Quad Cities for the 2026 season and played in 115 games in which he batted .234 with 23 home runs, 75 RBIs, and 27 stolen bases.
