= KBSO =

- Corpus Christi, Texas; United States
- Broadcast area: Corpus Christi, Texas
- Frequency: 94.7 MHz
- Branding: Retro 94.7

Programming
- Format: Classic hits

Ownership
- Owner: Reina Broadcasting Inc.

History
- First air date: 1993

Technical information
- Licensing authority: FCC
- Facility ID: 55679
- Class: C3
- ERP: 25,000 watts
- HAAT: 87 meters (285 ft)
- Transmitter coordinates: 27°49′50″N 97°32′34″W
- Translator: 106.9 K295DE (Ingleside)

Links
- Public license information: Public file; LMS
- Webcast: Listen Live
- Website: retro947.net

KBSO (94.7 FM, "Retro 94.7") is a radio station broadcasting a classic hits format and licensed to Corpus Christi, Texas, United States. The station is currently owned by Reina Broadcasting Inc.

== History ==
The Federal Communications Commission issued a construction permit for the station on February 12, 1991. The station was assigned the KBSO call sign on March 1, 1991, and received its license to cover on January 25, 1993.

On June 1, 2013, KBSO, rebranded as "My 94.7".

On January 16, 2015, KBSO rebranded as "94.7 The Rig".

On May 3, 2015, KBSO adopted KYRK's old format as "94.7 The Shark".

On July 2, 2015, KBSO changed its format to a simulcast of Texas Country-formatted KCCT 1150 AM. In 2017, the KCCT simulcast broke, with KCCT flipping to '80s music and KBSO remaining with Texas music.

On January 2, 2024, the station once again assumed the old format of KCCT, flipping to classic hits as "Retro 94.7".
