= List of medical abbreviations: K =

Sortable table
Abbreviation	Meaning
K	potassium
K^{+}	potassium
KA	ketoacidosis
Kcal	kilocalorie; calorie
KCCT	kaolin cephalin clotting time (see Partial thromboplastin time)
KELS	Kohlman Evaluation of Living Skills
kg	kilogram
KIV	keep in view
KLS	kidney, liver, spleen
K_{m}	Michaelis constant
KOH	potassium hydroxide
KS	Kaposi's sarcoma; Kartagener syndrome
KSHV	Kaposi's sarcoma-associated herpesvirus
KT	Kidney Transplantation
KUB	kidneys, ureters, and bladder (x-ray)
KVO	keep vein open (with slow infusion)
