= Lakeside, Texas =

Lakeside is the name of some places in the U.S. state of Texas:

- Lakeside, San Patricio County, Texas
- Lakeside, Tarrant County, Texas

== See also ==
- Lakeside City, Texas, Archer County
