= KZAR =

- McQueeney, Texas; United States
- Broadcast area: San Antonio, Texas
- Frequency: 97.7 MHz

Programming
- Language: English
- Format: Contemporary worship music
- Network: Air1

Ownership
- Owner: Educational Media Foundation
- Sister stations: KZLV, KZAI

History
- First air date: July 1989; 36 years ago
- Former call signs: KQRO-FM (1987–1995); KVCQ (1995–2003); KNGT (2003–2005); KLTO-FM (2005–2011)
- Call sign meaning: Air1

Technical information
- Licensing authority: FCC
- Facility ID: 25588
- Class: C1
- ERP: 100,000 watts
- HAAT: 299 m (981 ft)
- Transmitter coordinates: 29°22′11.00″N 97°39′44.00″W

Links
- Public license information: Public file; LMS
- Webcast: Listen Live
- Website: air1.com

For the former Iraqi intelligence official, see Nadhim Kzar.

KZAR (97.7 FM) is an Air1-affiliated radio station licensed to McQueeney, Texas, United States. The station serves the San Antonio area with a contemporary worship music format. The station is owned by Educational Media Foundation.

== History ==
KZAR began operations in July 1989 as KQRO-FM, a 3 kilowatt class A facility licensed to Cuero, Texas, changing call letters to KVCQ in 1995, KNGT in 2003, and KLTO-FM in 2005. It moved to its current tower, licensed to McQueeney, Texas, and upgraded to the current C1 class by 2008.

When it moved to San Antonio, KLTO-FM broadcast a reggaeton format until 2008, then changed to rock under the "977 Rock" branding.

On February 4, 2011, the station changed formats to top 40 as "Party 97.7". The station's direction leaned towards dance, but played the usual top 40/CHR fare, similar to rivals KXXM and KTFM.

On August 15, 2011, Univision Radio sold KLTO-FM to Educational Media Foundation, which flipped the station to the Air 1 network (which at that time carried a Christian rock format) in mid to late November. Its previous formats could be heard on KBBT HD2 when Univision had it.

== See also ==
- List of radio stations in Texas
