= Ingleside Independent School District =

School district in Texas, United States

Address
- 2664 San Angelo Ingleside, Texas, 78362; United States

District information
- Grades: PK–12
- Schools: 4
- NCES District ID: 4824180

Students and staff
- Students: 2,010 (2023–2024)
- Teachers: 131.80 (on an FTE basis)
- Student–teacher ratio: 15.25:1

Other information
- Website: www.inglesideisd.org

Ingleside Independent School District is a public school district based in Ingleside, Texas (USA). It is known as the Home of the Fighting Mustangs.

In addition to most of Ingleside, the district also serves the city of Ingleside on the Bay and includes sections of Corpus Christi in San Patricio County.

In 2009, the school district was rated "academically acceptable" by the Texas Education Agency.

In 2010, the school district was rated "recognized" by the Texas Education Agency.

In 2024, the Ingleside High School BBQ team won the 2024 High School BBQ, Inc. State Championship. https://www.kristv.com/news/local-news/in-your-neighborhood/san-patricio-county/ingleside/ingleside-high-school-bbq-team-wins-the-state-championship-in-their-second-year

== Schools ==
- Ingleside High (Grades 8-12)**
- Leon Taylor Junior High (Grades 6-7)**
- Leon Taylor Elementary (Grade 5)**
- Gilbert J. Mircovich Elementary (Grades 2-4)
- Ingleside Primary (Grades PK-1)

Grades PK-1 were originally located in Elizabeth Cook Primary before the school closed.

  - Recently changed due to demolition and reconstruction of the junior high; temporary.

== Mascots ==
- High School: Mustangs
- Junior High: Ponies
