= Edgewater Estates, Texas =

- Census-designated place
- Interactive map of Edgewater Estates, Texas
- Coordinates: 28°5′49″N 97°51′54″W
- Country: United States
- State: Texas
- County: San Patricio

Area
  - Total: 0.1 sq mi (0.26 km^{2})
  - Land: 0.1 sq mi (0.26 km^{2})
  - Water: 0.0 sq mi (0 km^{2})

Population (2010)
  - Total: 72
  - Density: 720/sq mi (280/km^{2})
- Time zone: UTC-6 (Central (CST))
  - Summer (DST): UTC-5 (CDT)
- Zip Code: 78368

Edgewater Estates is a census-designated place (CDP) in San Patricio County, Texas, United States. As of the 2020 census, Edgewater Estates had a population of 71. Prior to the 2010 census, Edgewater Estates was part of the Edgewater-Paisano CDP.

== Geography ==
Edgewater Estates is located at 28°5′49″N 97°51′54″W (28.096882, -97.864972).

== Demographics ==
Historical population
Census	Pop.	Note	%±
2010	72		—
2020	71		−1.4%
U.S. Decennial Census; 1850–1900 1910; 1920 1930 1940; 1950 1960 1970; 1980 1990 2000; 2010 2020

Edgewater Estates first appeared as a census designated place in the 2010 U.S. census, one of two CDPs (along with the Paisano Park CDP) split out from the deleted Edgewater-Paisano CDP.

=== 2020 census ===
Edgewater Estates CDP, Texas – Racial and ethnic composition Note: the US Census treats Hispanic/Latino as an ethnic category. This table excludes Latinos from the racial categories and assigns them to a separate category. Hispanics/Latinos may be of any race.
Race / Ethnicity (NH = Non-Hispanic)	Pop 2010	Pop 2020	% 2010	% 2020
White alone (NH)	18	30	25.00%	42.25%
Black or African American alone (NH)	0	1	0.00%	1.41%
Native American or Alaska Native alone (NH)	0	0	0.00%	0.00%
Asian alone (NH)	0	1	0.00%	1.41%
Native Hawaiian or Pacific Islander alone (NH)	0	0	0.00%	0.00%
Other race alone (NH)	0	3	0.00%	4.23%
Mixed race or Multiracial (NH)	0	2	0.00%	2.82%
Hispanic or Latino (any race)	54	34	75.00%	47.89%
Total	72	71	100.00%	100.00%

== Education ==
It is in the Mathis Independent School District.

Del Mar College is the designated community college for all of San Patricio County.
