= KCCT =

Radio station in Corpus Christi, Texas

- Corpus Christi, Texas; United States
- Broadcast area: Corpus Christi metropolitan area
- Frequency: 1150 kHz
- Branding: Retro Tejano 104.1

Programming
- Format: Classic Tejano

Ownership
- Owner: Manuel Davila Jr. nicknamed "Daddy D" (Radio KCCT Inc.)

History
- First air date: May 6, 1954
- Call sign meaning: Corpus Christi, Texas

Technical information
- Licensing authority: FCC
- Facility ID: 54646
- Class: B
- Power: 1,000 watts (day); 500 watts (night)
- ERP: 99 watts (FM translator)
- Transmitter coordinates: 27°48′1″N 97°28′44″W
- Translator: 104.1 K281AV (Corpus Christi)

Links
- Public license information: Public file; LMS
- Website: Official website

KCCT (1150 kHz) is a commercial AM radio station licensed to Corpus Christi, Texas. It is owned by Manuel Davila, Jr., and airs a classic tejano format. The studios, offices and transmitter are off Benys Road in Corpus Christi. Programming is also heard on FM translator K281AV at 104.1 MHz. The station calls itself "Retro Tejano 104.1".

== History ==
On May 6, 1954, KCCT first signed on. It was a daytimer, owned by the International Radio Company. KCCT was a Spanish-language station through most of its history, aimed at the Mexican-American community in and around Corpus Christi. In the early 1980s, KCCT was given nighttime authorization by the Federal Communications Commission to broadcast at 1000 watts by day and 500 watts at night, using a directional antenna at all times to protect other stations on AM 1150.

On June 2, 2017, KCCT changed its format from Americana and Texas-oriented country music to classic hits, branded as "Retro 104.1."

On January 2, 2024, the "Retro" format moved to KBSO, with KCCT flipping to a classic Tejano music format as "Retro Tejano 104.1".
