= Mathis Independent School District =

School district in Texas, United States

Address
- 602 East San Patricio Ave Mathis, Texas, 78368; United States

District information
- Grades: PK–12
- Schools: 4
- NCES District ID: 4829400

Students and staff
- Students: 1,447 (2023–2024)
- Teachers: 100.88 (on an FTE basis)
- Student–teacher ratio: 14.34:1

Other information
- Website: www.mathisisd.org

Mathis Independent School District is a public school district based in Mathis, Texas (USA).

Located mostly in San Patricio County, small portions of the district extend into Live Oak, and Bee counties.

Other communities served by the district include: Edgewater Estates, Lake City, Lakeshore Gardens-Hidden Acres, Lakeside, Paisano Park, and San Patricio. Previously Edgewater Estates and Paisano Park were in a single census-designated place, Edgewater-Paisano.

In 2009, the school district was rated "academically acceptable" by the Texas Education Agency.

== Schools ==
- Mathis High School (Grades 9–12)
- Mathis Middle School (Grades 6–8)
- Mathis Intermediate School (Grades 3–5)
- Mathis Elementary School (Grades PK-2)

== Administration ==
Superintendent: Todd White

== Board of trustees ==
- Melinda Barajas, President
- Justine Sablatura, Vice President
- Rick Cortez Jr., Secretary
- Ramon Acosta, Member
- Angie Trejo, Member
- Thomas Deleon, Member
- Moises Alfaro, Member
