= Del Ser =

Del Ser or del Ser may refer to:

- Carlos del Ser, Spanish gymnast
- Delta Serpentis, star

== See also ==
- Del Sol
