= Sodville, Texas =

Rural community in Texas, United States

Sodville
- Interactive map of Sodville
- Coordinates: 27°58′10″N 97°28′23″W
- Country: United States of America
- State: Texas
- County: San Patricio

Sodville is a dispersed rural community in San Patricio County, Texas, United States, near the intersection of Farm-to-market roads 1074 and 1944.

== Education ==
Sodville is served by the Sinton Independent School District.

Del Mar College is the designated community college for all of San Patricio County.
