= Paisano Park, Texas =

- Census-designated place
- Interactive map of Paisano Park, Texas
- Coordinates: 28°5′42″N 97°51′33″W
- Country: United States
- State: Texas
- County: San Patricio

Area
  - Total: 0.1 sq mi (0.26 km^{2})
  - Land: 0.1 sq mi (0.26 km^{2})
  - Water: 0.0 sq mi (0 km^{2})

Population (2010)
  - Total: 130
  - Density: 1,300/sq mi (500/km^{2})
- Time zone: UTC-6 (Central (CST))
  - Summer (DST): UTC-5 (CDT)
- Zip Code: 78368

Paisano Park is a census-designated place (CDP) in San Patricio County, Texas, United States. As of the 2020 census, Paisano Park had a population of 96. Prior to the 2010 census, Paisano Park was part of the Edgewater-Paisano CDP.

== Geography ==
Paisano Park is located at 28°5′42″N 97°51′33″W (28.095075, -97.859207).

== Demographics ==
Historical population
Census	Pop.	Note	%±
2010	130		—
2020	96		−26.2%
U.S. Decennial Census; 1850–1900 1910; 1920 1930 1940; 1950 1960 1970; 1980 1990 2000; 2010 2020

Paisano Park first appeared as a census designated place in the 2010 U.S. census, one of two CDPs (along with the Edgewater Estates CDP) split out from the deleted Edgewater-Paisano CDP.

=== 2020 census ===
Paisano Park CDP, Texas – Racial and ethnic composition Note: the US Census treats Hispanic/Latino as an ethnic category. This table excludes Latinos from the racial categories and assigns them to a separate category. Hispanics/Latinos may be of any race.
Race / Ethnicity (NH = Non-Hispanic)	Pop 2010	Pop 2020	% 2010	% 2020
White alone (NH)	3	18	2.31%	18.75%
Black or African American alone (NH)	2	0	1.54%	0.00%
Native American or Alaska Native alone (NH)	0	0	0.00%	0.00%
Asian alone (NH)	0	0	0.00%	0.00%
Native Hawaiian or Pacific Islander alone (NH)	0	0	0.00%	0.00%
Other race alone (NH)	1	1	0.77%	1.04%
Mixed race or Multiracial (NH)	0	3	0.00%	3.13%
Hispanic or Latino (any race)	124	74	95.38%	77.08%
Total	130	96	100.00%	100.00%

== Education ==
It is in the Mathis Independent School District.

Del Mar College is the designated community college for all of San Patricio County.
