= Rancho Chico, Texas =

- CDP
- Coordinates: 28°1′39″N 97°29′52″W
- Country: United States
- State: Texas
- County: San Patricio

Area
  - Total: 0.50 sq mi (1.3 km^{2})
  - Land: 0.50 sq mi (1.3 km^{2})
  - Water: 0 sq mi (0.0 km^{2})
- Elevation: 49 ft (15 m)

Population (2020)
  - Total: 387
  - Density: 770/sq mi (300/km^{2})
- Time zone: UTC-6 (Central (CST))
  - Summer (DST): UTC-5 (CDT)
- Zip Code: 78387
- FIPS code: 48-60534
- GNIS feature ID: 1852757

Rancho Chico is a census-designated place (CDP) in San Patricio County, Texas, United States. The population was 387 at the 2020 census.

== Geography ==
Rancho Chico is located at 28°1′39″N 97°29′52″W (28.027379, -97.497682).

According to the United States Census Bureau, the CDP has a total area of 0.5 square mile (1.3 km^{2}), all land.

== Demographics ==
Historical population
Census	Pop.	Note	%±
2000	309		—
2010	396		28.2%
2020	387		−2.3%
U.S. Decennial Census; 1850–1900 1910; 1920 1930 1940; 1950 1960 1970; 1980 1990 2000; 2010 2020

Rancho Chico first appeared as a census designated place in the 2000 U.S. census.

=== 2020 census ===
Rancho Chico CDP, Texas – Racial and ethnic composition Note: the US Census treats Hispanic/Latino as an ethnic category. This table excludes Latinos from the racial categories and assigns them to a separate category. Hispanics/Latinos may be of any race.
Race / Ethnicity (NH = Non-Hispanic)	Pop 2000	Pop 2010	Pop 2020	% 2000	% 2010	% 2020
White alone (NH)	23	34	23	7.44%	8.59%	5.94%
Black or African American alone (NH)	9	9	9	2.91%	2.27%	2.33%
Native American or Alaska Native alone (NH)	0	0	0	0.00%	0.00%	0.00%
Asian alone (NH)	0	0	0	0.00%	0.00%	0.00%
Native Hawaiian or Pacific Islander alone (NH)	0	0	0	0.00%	0.00%	0.00%
Other race alone (NH)	0	0	5	0.00%	0.00%	1.29%
Mixed race or Multiracial (NH)	5	1	2	1.62%	0.25%	0.52%
Hispanic or Latino (any race)	272	352	348	88.03%	88.89%	89.92%
Total	309	396	387	100.00%	100.00%	100.00%

=== 2000 census ===
As of the census of 2000, there were 309 people, 100 households, and 74 families residing in the CDP. The population density was 627.8 inhabitants per square mile (242.4/km^{2}). There were 116 housing units at an average density of 235.7 per square mile (91.0/km^{2}). The racial makeup of the CDP was 65.05% White, 2.91% African American, 25.57% from other races, and 6.47% from two or more races. Hispanic or Latino of any race were 88.03% of the population.

There were 100 households, out of which 36.0% had children under the age of 18 living with them, 50.0% were married couples living together, 17.0% had a female householder with no husband present, and 26.0% were non-families. 24.0% of all households were made up of individuals, and 7.0% had someone living alone who was 65 years of age or older. The average household size was 3.09 and the average family size was 3.73.

In the CDP, the population was spread out, with 32.0% under the age of 18, 8.7% from 18 to 24, 29.1% from 25 to 44, 19.1% from 45 to 64, and 11.0% who were 65 years of age or older. The median age was 33 years. For every 100 females, there were 111.6 males. For every 100 females age 18 and over, there were 112.1 males.

The median income for a household in the CDP was $21,111, and the median income for a family was $21,111. Males had a median income of $16,944 versus $40,125 for females. The per capita income for the CDP was $9,442. About 33.8% of families and 36.4% of the population were below the poverty line, including 63.0% of those under the age of eighteen and 18.6% of those 65 or over.

== Education ==
Rancho Chico is served by the Sinton Independent School District. The district's comprehensive high school is Sinton High School.

Del Mar College is the designated community college for all of San Patricio County.
