= Lake City, Texas =

- Town
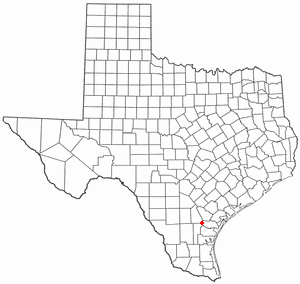
- Location of Lake City, Texas

- Coordinates: 28°4′47″N 97°53′8″W
- Country: United States
- State: Texas
- County: San Patricio

Area
  - Total: 0.75 sq mi (1.95 km^{2})
  - Land: 0.73 sq mi (1.89 km^{2})
  - Water: 0.027 sq mi (0.07 km^{2})
- Elevation: 118 ft (36 m)

Population (2020)
  - Total: 447
  - Density: 613/sq mi (237/km^{2})
- Time zone: UTC-6 (Central (CST))
  - Summer (DST): UTC-5 (CDT)
- FIPS code: 48-40472
- GNIS feature ID: 1388616
- Website: www.lakecitytx.org

Lake City is a town in San Patricio County, Texas, United States. The population was 447 at the 2020 census, down from 509 at the 2010 census.

== Geography ==
Lake City is located at 28°4′47″N 97°53′8″W (28.079632, –97.885443).

According to the United States Census Bureau, the town has a total area of 0.7 square mile (1.7 km^{2}), of which 0.6 square mile (1.7 km^{2}) is land and 0.04 square mile (0.1 km^{2}) (5.97%) is water.

== Demographics ==
Historical population
Census	Pop.	Note	%±
1980	431		—
1990	465		7.9%
2000	526		13.1%
2010	509		−3.2%
2020	447		−12.2%
U.S. Decennial Census

As of the census of 2000, there were 526 people, 224 households, and 161 families residing in the town. The population density was 824.4 inhabitants per square mile (318.3/km^{2}). There were 309 housing units at an average density of 484.3 per square mile (187.0/km^{2}). The racial makeup of the town was 83.46% White, 0.19% African American, 0.57% Native American, 12.55% from other races, and 3.23% from two or more races. Hispanic or Latino of any race were 30.80% of the population.

There were 224 households, out of which 26.3% had children under the age of 18 living with them, 55.8% were married couples living together, 10.7% had a female householder with no husband present, and 28.1% were non-families. 25.0% of all households were made up of individuals, and 11.6% had someone living alone who was 65 years of age or older. The average household size was 2.35 and the average family size was 2.75.

In the town, the population was spread out, with 22.1% under the age of 18, 6.8% from 18 to 24, 19.4% from 25 to 44, 26.2% from 45 to 64, and 25.5% who were 65 years of age or older. The median age was 46 years. For every 100 females, there were 83.3 males. For every 100 females age 18 and over, there were 85.5 males.

The median income for a household in the town was $31,146, and the median income for a family was $40,250. Males had a median income of $37,917 versus $21,250 for females. The per capita income for the town was $20,457. About 9.5% of families and 13.3% of the population were below the poverty line, including 14.8% of those under age 18 and 13.4% of those age 65 or over.

== Education ==
The Town of Lake City is served by the Mathis Independent School District.

Del Mar College is the designated community college for all of San Patricio County.
