= Edgewater-Paisano, Texas =

- former CDP
- Coordinates: 28°5′46″N 97°51′46″W
- Country: United States
- State: Texas
- County: San Patricio

Area
  - Total: 0.27 sq mi (0.7 km^{2})
  - Land: 0.27 sq mi (0.7 km^{2})
  - Water: 0 sq mi (0.0 km^{2})
- Elevation: 128 ft (39 m)

Population (2000)
  - Total: 182
  - Density: 656/sq mi (253.4/km^{2})
- Time zone: UTC-6 (Central (CST))
  - Summer (DST): UTC-5 (CDT)
- FIPS code: 48-22594
- GNIS feature ID: 1852701

Edgewater-Paisano is a suburb of Mathis, Texas and a census-designated place (CDP) in San Patricio County, Texas, United States. The population was 182 at the 2000 U.S. census.

The Edgewater-Paisano CDP, active in the 2000 census, was deleted in the 2010 census and parts taken to form Edgewater Estates and Paisano Park CDPs.

== Geography ==
Edgewater-Paisano is located at 28°5′46″N 97°51′46″W (28.096048, -97.862754).

According to the United States Census Bureau, the CDP has a total area of 0.3 square miles (0.78 km^{2}), all land.

== Demographics ==
Historical population
Census	Pop.	Note	%±
2000	182		—
U.S. Decennial Census; 1850–1900 1910; 1920 1930 1940; 1950 1960 1970; 1980 1990 2000; 2010

Edgewater-Paisano first appeared as a census designated place in the 2000 U.S. census. The CDP was split prior to the 2010 U.S. census into the Edgewater Estates CDP and the Paisano Park CDP.

Edgewater-Paisano CDP, Texas – Racial and ethnic composition Note: the US Census treats Hispanic/Latino as an ethnic category. This table excludes Latinos from the racial categories and assigns them to a separate category. Hispanics/Latinos may be of any race.
Race / Ethnicity (NH = Non-Hispanic)	Pop 2000	% 2000
White alone (NH)	57	31.32%
Black or African American alone (NH)	0	0.00%
Native American or Alaska Native alone (NH)	0	0.00%
Asian alone (NH)	0	0.00%
Pacific Islander alone (NH)	0	0.00%
Other race alone (NH)	0	0.00%
Mixed race or Multiracial (NH)	0	0.00%
Hispanic or Latino (any race)	125	68.68%
Total	182	100.00%

As of the census of 2000, there were 182 people, 60 households, and 46 families residing in the CDP. The population density was 656.3 inhabitants per square mile (253.4/km^{2}). There were 69 housing units at an average density of 248.8 per square mile (96.1/km^{2}). The racial makeup of the CDP was 60.99% White, 0.55% African American, 31.87% from other races, and 6.59% from two or more races. Hispanic or Latino of any race were 68.68% of the population.

There were 60 households, out of which 38.3% had children under the age of 18 living with them, 58.3% were married couples living together, 16.7% had a female householder with no husband present, and 21.7% were non-families. 20.0% of all households were made up of individuals, and 11.7% had someone living alone who was 65 years of age or older. The average household size was 3.03 and the average family size was 3.51.

In the CDP, the population was spread out, with 33.5% under the age of 18, 7.7% from 18 to 24, 24.2% from 25 to 44, 24.7% from 45 to 64, and 9.9% who were 65 years of age or older. The median age was 31 years. For every 100 females, there were 93.6 males. For every 100 females age 18 and over, there were 108.6 males.

The median income for a household in the CDP was $26,111, and the median income for a family was $26,667. Males had a median income of $16,607 versus $17,083 for females. The per capita income for the CDP was $9,080. About 41.3% of families and 40.4% of the population were below the poverty line, including 50.0% of those under the age of eighteen and 22.7% of those 65 or over.

== Education ==
Edgewater-Paisano is served by the Mathis Independent School District.

Del Mar College is the designated community college for all of San Patricio County, and had been since 1995.
