= Del Sol, Texas =

- Census-designated place
- Interactive map of Del Sol, Texas
- Coordinates: 28°0′47″N 97°31′13″W
- Country: United States
- State: Texas
- County: San Patricio

Area
  - Total: 0.9 sq mi (2.3 km^{2})
  - Land: 0.9 sq mi (2.3 km^{2})
  - Water: 0.0 sq mi (0 km^{2})

Population (2010)
  - Total: 239
  - Density: 270/sq mi (100/km^{2})
- Time zone: UTC-6 (Central (CST))
  - Summer (DST): UTC-5 (CDT)
- Zip Code: 78387

Del Sol is a census-designated place (CDP) in San Patricio County, Texas, United States. As of the 2020 census, Del Sol had a population of 333. Prior to the 2010 census, Del Sol was part of the Del Sol-Loma Linda CDP.

== Geography ==
Del Sol is located at 28°0′47″N 97°31′13″W (28.013160, -97.520239).

== Demographics ==
Historical population
Census	Pop.	Note	%±
2010	239		—
2020	333		39.3%
U.S. Decennial Census; 1850–1900 1910; 1920 1930 1940; 1950 1960 1970; 1980 1990 2000; 2010 2020

Del Sol first appeared as a census designated place in the 2010 U.S. census, one of three CDPs (along with La Paloma Addition CDP and Loma Linda CDP) split out from the deleted Del Sol-Loma Linda CDP.

=== 2020 census ===
Del Sol CDP, Texas – Racial and ethnic composition Note: the US Census treats Hispanic/Latino as an ethnic category. This table excludes Latinos from the racial categories and assigns them to a separate category. Hispanics/Latinos may be of any race.
Race / Ethnicity (NH = Non-Hispanic)	Pop 2010	Pop 2020	% 2010	% 2020
White alone (NH)	38	36	15.90%	10.81%
Black or African American alone (NH)	1	4	0.42%	1.20%
Native American or Alaska Native alone (NH)	0	0	0.00%	0.00%
Asian alone (NH)	0	2	0.00%	0.60%
Native Hawaiian or Pacific Islander alone (NH)	0	2	0.00%	0.60%
Other race alone (NH)	0	0	0.00%	0.00%
Mixed race or Multiracial (NH)	0	3	0.00%	0.90%
Hispanic or Latino (any race)	200	286	83.68%	85.89%
Total	239	333	100.00%	100.00%

== Education ==
It is in the Sinton Independent School District. The district's comprehensive high school is Sinton High School.

Del Mar College is the designated community college for all of San Patricio County.
