= Doyle, Texas =

- Former census-designated place
- Coordinates: 27°53′11″N 97°20′35″W
- Country: United States
- State: Texas
- County: San Patricio

Area
  - Total: 0.85 sq mi (2.2 km^{2})
  - Land: 0.85 sq mi (2.2 km^{2})
  - Water: 0 sq mi (0.0 km^{2})
- Elevation: 20 ft (6 m)

Population (2010)
  - Total: 254
  - Density: 300/sq mi (120/km^{2})
- Time zone: UTC-6 (Central (CST))
  - Summer (DST): UTC-5 (CDT)
- FIPS code: 48-21283
- GNIS feature ID: 1852700

Doyle is a former census-designated place (CDP) in San Patricio County, Texas, United States. The population were 254 at the 2010 census.

== Geography ==
Doyle is located at 27°53′11″N 97°20′35″W (27.886313, -97.343129).

According to the United States Census Bureau, the CDP has a total area of 0.8 square miles (2.1 km^{2}), all land.

== Demographics ==
Historical population
Census	Pop.	Note	%±
2000	285		—
2010	254		−10.9%
U.S. Decennial Census; 1850–1900 1910; 1920 1930 1940; 1950 1960 1970; 1980 1990 2000; 2010

Doyle first appeared as a census designated place in the 2000 U.S. census. It was deleted prior to the 2020 U.S. census after the residential portions of the CDP were annexed to the city of Portland.

=== 2010 census ===
Doyle CDP, Texas – Racial and ethnic composition Note: the US Census treats Hispanic/Latino as an ethnic category. This table excludes Latinos from the racial categories and assigns them to a separate category. Hispanics/Latinos may be of any race.
Race / Ethnicity (NH = Non-Hispanic)	Pop 2000	Pop 2010	% 2000	% 2010
White alone (NH)	147	131	51.58%	51.57%
Black or African American alone (NH)	2	0	0.70%	0.00%
Native American or Alaska Native alone (NH)	2	5	0.70%	1.97%
Asian alone (NH)	0	1	0.00%	0.39%
Pacific Islander alone (NH)	0	0	0.00%	0.00%
Other race alone (NH)	0	1	0.00%	0.39%
Mixed race or Multiracial (NH)	10	6	3.51%	2.36%
Hispanic or Latino (any race)	124	110	43.51%	43.31%
Total	285	254	100.00%	100.00%

As of the census of 2000, there were 285 people, 110 households, and 76 families residing in the CDP. The population density was 338.2 inhabitants per square mile (130.6/km^{2}). There were 129 housing units at an average density of 153.1 per square mile (59.1/km^{2}). The racial makeup of the CDP was 77.89% White, 0.70% African American, 0.70% Native American, 15.44% from other races, and 5.26% from two or more races. Hispanic or Latino of any race were 43.51% of the population.

There were 110 households, out of which 28.2% had children under the age of 18 living with them, 48.2% were married couples living together, 15.5% had a female householder with no husband present, and 30.9% were non-families. 25.5% of all households were made up of individuals, and 9.1% had someone living alone who was 65 years of age or older. The average household size was 2.59 and the average family size was 3.14.

In the CDP, the population was spread out, with 25.6% under the age of 18, 8.4% from 18 to 24, 28.4% from 25 to 44, 23.2% from 45 to 64, and 14.4% who were 65 years of age or older. The median age was 39 years. For every 100 females, there were 100.7 males. For every 100 females age 18 and over, there were 94.5 males.

The median income for a household in the CDP was $27,857, and the median income for a family was $30,750. Males had a median income of $14,861 versus $16,607 for females. The per capita income for the CDP was $12,286. None of the families and 7.4% of the population were living below the poverty line, including no under eighteens and 12.5% of those over 64.

== Education ==
Gregory-Portland High School

Doyle is served by the Gregory-Portland Independent School District. All students in grades 9 through 12 in Doyle attend school at Gregory-Portland High School.
