= Odem-Edroy Independent School District =

School district in Texas, United States

Address
- 1 Owl Square Odem, Texas, 78370; United States

District information
- Grades: PK–12
- Superintendent: Dr. Yolanda Carr
- Schools: 4
- NCES District ID: 4833360

Students and staff
- Students: 913 (2023–2024)
- Teachers: 70.60 (on an FTE basis)
- Student–teacher ratio: 12.93:1

Other information
- Website: www.oeisd.org

Odem-Edroy Independent School District is a public school district based in Odem, Texas (USA).

In addition to Odem, the district serves the communities of Edroy and Bethel.

Odem-Edroy ISD has four campuses: Odem High School (Grades 9–12), Odem Junior High (Grades 6–8), Odem Intermediate (Grades 3–5), and Odem Elementary (PK-2).

In 2009, the school district was rated "academically acceptable" by the Texas Education Agency.

As of the 2021-2022 school year, the district serves 839 students and has a student-teacher ratio of 12.08.
