= Taft Southwest, Texas =

- CDP
- Coordinates: 27°58′13″N 97°24′11″W
- Country: United States
- State: Texas
- County: San Patricio

Area
  - Total: 0.62 sq mi (1.6 km^{2})
  - Land: 0.62 sq mi (1.6 km^{2})
  - Water: 0 sq mi (0.0 km^{2})

Population (2020)
  - Total: 1,296
  - Density: 2,100/sq mi (810/km^{2})
- Time zone: UTC-6 (Central (CST))
  - Summer (DST): UTC-5 (CDT)
- Zip Code: 78390
- FIPS code: 48-71696

Taft Southwest is a census-designated place (CDP) in San Patricio County, Texas, United States. The population was 1,296 at the 2020 census.

== Geography ==
Taft Southwest is located at 27°58′13″N 97°24′11″W (27.970392, -97.403156).

According to the United States Census Bureau, the CDP has a total area of 0.6 square mile (1.6 km^{2}), all land.

== Demographics ==
Historical population
Census	Pop.	Note	%±
1960	1,927		—
1970	2,026		5.1%
1980	2,133		5.3%
2000	1,721		—
2010	1,460		−15.2%
2020	1,296		−11.2%
U.S. Decennial Census; 1850–1900 1910; 1920 1930 1940; 1950 1960 1970; 1980 1990 2000; 2010 2020

Taft Southwest first appeared as an unincorporated community in the 1960 U.S. census; and a census designated place in the 1980 United States census.

=== 2020 census ===
Taft Southwest CDP, Texas – Racial and ethnic composition Note: the US Census treats Hispanic/Latino as an ethnic category. This table excludes Latinos from the racial categories and assigns them to a separate category. Hispanics/Latinos may be of any race.
Race / Ethnicity (NH = Non-Hispanic)	Pop 2000	Pop 2010	Pop 2020	% 2000	% 2010	% 2020
White alone (NH)	46	54	56	2.67%	3.70%	4.32%
Black or African American alone (NH)	1	6	6	0.06%	0.41%	0.46%
Native American or Alaska Native alone (NH)	1	5	0	0.06%	0.34%	0.00%
Asian alone (NH)	0	0	1	0.00%	0.00%	0.08%
Native Hawaiian or Pacific Islander alone (NH)	0	0	0	0.00%	0.00%	0.00%
Other race alone (NH)	0	0	4	0.00%	0.00%	0.31%
Mixed race or Multiracial (NH)	2	1	6	0.12%	0.07%	0.46%
Hispanic or Latino (any race)	1,671	1,394	1,223	97.09%	95.48%	94.37%
Total	1,721	1,460	1,296	100.00%	100.00%	100.00%

=== 2000 census ===
As of the census of 2000, there were 1,721 people, 477 households, and 392 families residing in the CDP. The population density was 2,845.2 inhabitants per square mile (1,098.5/km^{2}). There were 532 housing units at an average density of 879.5 per square mile (339.6/km^{2}). The racial makeup of the CDP was 69.26% White, 0.06% African American, 0.17% Native American, 0.17% Pacific Islander, 26.73% from other races, and 3.60% from two or more races. Hispanic or Latino of any race were 97.09% of the population.

There were 477 households, out of which 38.6% had children under the age of 18 living with them, 56.4% were married couples living together, 19.5% had a female householder with no husband present, and 17.8% were non-families. 16.1% of all households were made up of individuals, and 9.2% had someone living alone who was 65 years of age or older. The average household size was 3.61 and the average family size was 4.08.

In the CDP the population was spread out, with 33.5% under the age of 18, 10.8% from 18 to 24, 23.9% from 25 to 44, 19.7% from 45 to 64, and 12.1% who were 65 years of age or older. The median age was 30 years. For every 100 females, there were 102.2 males. For every 100 females age 18 and over, there were 95.1 males.

The median income for a household in the CDP was $22,179, and the median income for a family was $24,250. Males had a median income of $22,279 versus $12,143 for females. The per capita income for the CDP was $8,813. About 30.5% of families and 34.3% of the population were below the poverty line, including 40.7% of those under age 18 and 39.5% of those age 65 or over.

== Education ==
Taft Southwest is served by the Taft Independent School District.

Del Mar College is the designated community college for all of San Patricio County.
