= Lakeshore Gardens-Hidden Acres, Texas =

- CDP
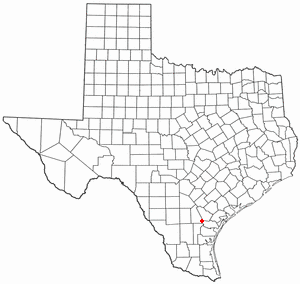
- Location of Lakeshore Gardens-Hidden Acres, Texas

- Coordinates: 28°7′34″N 97°51′55″W
- Country: United States
- State: Texas
- County: San Patricio

Area
  - Total: 2.0 sq mi (5.1 km^{2})
  - Land: 2.0 sq mi (5.1 km^{2})
  - Water: 0 sq mi (0.0 km^{2})

Population (2020)
  - Total: 637
  - Density: 320/sq mi (120/km^{2})
- Time zone: UTC-6 (Central (CST))
  - Summer (DST): UTC-5 (CDT)
- FIPS code: 48-40714

Lakeshore Gardens-Hidden Acres is a census-designated place (CDP) in San Patricio County, Texas, United States. The population was 637 at the 2020 census.

== Geography ==
Lakeshore Gardens-Hidden Acres is located at 28°7′34″N 97°51′55″W (28.126223, -97.865371). According to the United States Census Bureau, this census-designated place has a total area of 2.0 square miles (5.1 km^{2}), of which 2.0 square miles (5.1 km^{2}) is land and 0.51% is water.

== Demographics ==
Historical population
| Census | Pop. | Note | %± |
|---|---|---|---|
| 2000 | 720 | | — |
| 2010 | 504 | | −30.0% |
| 2020 | 637 | | 26.4% |
U.S. Decennial Census; 1850–1900 1910; 1920 1930 1940; 1950 1960 1970; 1980 1990 2000; 2010 2020

Lakeshore Gardens-Hidden Acres first appeared as a census designated place in the 2000 U.S. census.

=== 2020 census ===
Lakeshore Gardens-Hidden Acres CDP, Texas – Racial and ethnic composition Note: the US Census treats Hispanic/Latino as an ethnic category. This table excludes Latinos from the racial categories and assigns them to a separate category. Hispanics/Latinos may be of any race.
| Race / Ethnicity (NH = Non-Hispanic) | Pop 2000 | Pop 2010 | Pop 2020 | % 2000 | % 2010 | % 2020 |
|---|---|---|---|---|---|---|
| White alone (NH) | 495 | 276 | 314 | 68.75% | 54.76% | 49.29% |
| Black or African American alone (NH) | 0 | 0 | 2 | 0.00% | 0.00% | 0.31% |
| Native American or Alaska Native alone (NH) | 2 | 0 | 2 | 0.28% | 0.00% | 0.31% |
| Asian alone (NH) | 4 | 2 | 11 | 0.56% | 0.40% | 1.73% |
| Native Hawaiian or Pacific Islander alone (NH) | 0 | 0 | 0 | 0.00% | 0.00% | 0.00% |
| Other race alone (NH) | 8 | 0 | 0 | 1.11% | 0.00% | 0.00% |
| Mixed race or Multiracial (NH) | 7 | 1 | 15 | 0.97% | 0.20% | 2.35% |
| Hispanic or Latino (any race) | 204 | 225 | 293 | 28.33% | 44.64% | 46.00% |
| Total | 720 | 504 | 637 | 100.00% | 100.00% | 100.00% |

=== 2000 census ===
As of the census of 2000, there were 720 people, 303 households, and 212 families residing in the CDP. The population density was 368.7 inhabitants per square mile (142.4/km^{2}). There were 429 housing units at an average density of 219.7 per square mile (84.8/km^{2}). The racial makeup of the CDP was 87.50% White, 1.39% Native American, 0.56% Asian, 8.06% from other races, and 2.50% from two or more races. Hispanic or Latino of any race were 28.33% of the population.

There were 303 households, out of which 24.8% had children under the age of 18 living with them, 57.8% were married couples living together, 9.6% had a female householder with no husband present, and 30.0% were non-families. 24.8% of all households were made up of individuals, and 14.5% had someone living alone who was 65 years of age or older. The average household size was 2.38 and the average family size was 2.83.

In the CDP, the population was spread out, with 21.8% under the age of 18, 5.4% from 18 to 24, 22.9% from 25 to 44, 30.3% from 45 to 64, and 19.6% who were 65 years of age or older. The median age was 45 years. For every 100 females, there were 93.5 males. For every 100 females age 18 and over, there were 93.5 males.

The median income for a household in the CDP was $40,682, and the median income for a family was $42,778. Males had a median income of $31,500 versus $21,389 for females. The per capita income for the CDP was $52,512. About 9.3% of families and 16.7% of the population were below the poverty line, including 32.7% of those under age 18 and 8.6% of those age 65 or over.

== Education ==
Lakeshore Gardens-Hidden Acres is served by the Mathis Independent School District.

Del Mar College is the designated community college for all of San Patricio County.
