= St. Paul, San Patricio County, Texas =

Place in Texas, United States

St. Paul, Texas
- CDP
- Location of St. Paul, Texas

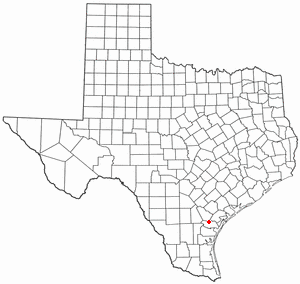
- Country: United States
- State: Texas
- County: San Patricio

Area
  - Total: 3.3 sq mi (8.5 km^{2})
  - Land: 3.3 sq mi (8.5 km^{2})
  - Water: 0.0 sq mi (0 km^{2})

Population (2020)
  - Total: 608
  - Density: 180/sq mi (71/km^{2})
- Time zone: UTC-6 (Central (CST))
  - Summer (DST): UTC-5 (CDT)
- Zip Code: 78387

St. Paul is a census-designated place (CDP) in San Patricio County, Texas, United States. The population was 608 at the 2020 census.

== Geography ==
St. Paul is located at 28°5′49″N 97°33′25″W (28.096973, -97.556883).

According to the United States Census Bureau, the CDP has a total area of 3.3 square miles (8.5 km^{2}), all land.

== Demographics ==
Historical population
| Census | Pop. | Note | %± |
|---|---|---|---|
| 2000 | 542 | | — |
| 2010 | 584 | | 7.7% |
| 2020 | 608 | | 4.1% |
U.S. Decennial Census; 1850–1900 1910; 1920 1930 1940; 1950 1960 1970; 1980 1990 2000; 2010 2020

St. Paul first appeared as a census designated place in the 2000 U.S. census.

=== 2020 census ===
St. Paul CDP, Texas – Racial and ethnic composition Note: the US Census treats Hispanic/Latino as an ethnic category. This table excludes Latinos from the racial categories and assigns them to a separate category. Hispanics/Latinos may be of any race.
| Race / Ethnicity (NH = Non-Hispanic) | Pop 2000 | Pop 2010 | Pop 2020 | % 2000 | % 2010 | % 2020 |
|---|---|---|---|---|---|---|
| White alone (NH) | 184 | 160 | 172 | 33.95% | 27.40% | 28.29% |
| Black or African American alone (NH) | 1 | 0 | 3 | 0.18% | 0.00% | 0.49% |
| Native American or Alaska Native alone (NH) | 0 | 0 | 6 | 0.00% | 0.00% | 0.99% |
| Asian alone (NH) | 0 | 0 | 2 | 0.00% | 0.00% | 0.33% |
| Native Hawaiian or Pacific Islander alone (NH) | 0 | 2 | 0 | 0.00% | 0.34% | 0.00% |
| Other race alone (NH) | 0 | 0 | 1 | 0.00% | 0.00% | 0.16% |
| Mixed race or Multiracial (NH) | 1 | 4 | 6 | 0.18% | 0.68% | 0.99% |
| Hispanic or Latino (any race) | 356 | 418 | 418 | 65.68% | 71.58% | 68.75% |
| Total | 542 | 584 | 608 | 100.00% | 100.00% | 100.00% |

=== 2000 census ===
As of the census of 2000, there were 542 people, 179 households, and 136 families residing in the CDP. The population density was 164.5 inhabitants per square mile (63.5/km^{2}). There were 209 housing units at an average density of 63.4 per square mile (24.5/km^{2}). The racial makeup of the CDP was 75.28% White, 0.18% African American, 1.48% Native American, 21.40% from other races, and 1.66% from two or more races. Hispanic or Latino of any race were 65.68% of the population.

There were 179 households, out of which 32.4% had children under the age of 18 living with them, 57.5% were married couples living together, 12.3% had a female householder with no husband present, and 24.0% were non-families. 22.3% of all households were made up of individuals, and 14.5% had someone living alone who was 65 years of age or older. The average household size was 3.03 and the average family size was 3.59.

In the CDP, the population was spread out, with 27.7% under the age of 18, 9.8% from 18 to 24, 25.8% from 25 to 44, 23.8% from 45 to 64, and 12.9% who were 65 years of age or older. The median age was 34 years. For every 100 females, there were 110.1 males. For every 100 females age 18 and over, there were 103.1 males.

The median income for a household in the CDP was $25,750, and the median income for a family was $32,679. Males had a median income of $25,972 versus $23,864 for females. The per capita income for the CDP was $11,239. About 20.0% of families and 12.9% of the population were below the poverty line, including 8.4% of those under age 18 and 45.9% of those age 65 or over.

== Education ==
St. Paul is served by the Sinton Independent School District. The district's comprehensive high school is Sinton High School.

Del Mar College is the designated community college for all of San Patricio County.
