= Edroy, Texas =

- CDP
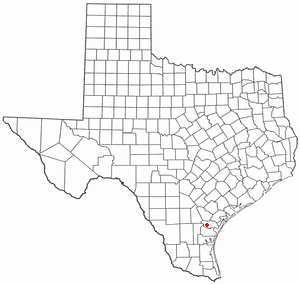
- Location of Edroy, Texas

- Coordinates: 27°58′18″N 97°40′32″W
- Country: United States
- State: Texas
- County: San Patricio

Area
  - Total: 2.1 sq mi (5.4 km^{2})
  - Land: 2.1 sq mi (5.4 km^{2})
  - Water: 0 sq mi (0.0 km^{2})
- Elevation: 95 ft (29 m)

Population (2020)
  - Total: 422
  - Density: 200/sq mi (78/km^{2})
- Time zone: UTC-6 (Central (CST))
  - Summer (DST): UTC-5 (CDT)
- ZIP code: 78352
- Area code: 361
- FIPS code: 48-22768
- GNIS feature ID: 1335110

Edroy is a census-designated place (CDP) in San Patricio County, Texas, United States. The population was 422 at the 2020 census.

== Etymology ==
The CDP was named for Ed Cubage and Roy Miller, who platted the site.

== Geography ==
Edroy is located at 27°58′18″N 97°40′32″W (27.971630, -97.675530).

According to the United States Census Bureau, the CDP has a total area of 2.1 square miles (5.4 km^{2}), all land.

== Demographics ==
Historical population
Census	Pop.	Note	%±
2000	420		—
2010	331		−21.2%
2020	422		27.5%
U.S. Decennial Census; 1850–1900 1910; 1920 1930 1940; 1950 1960 1970; 1980 1990 2000; 2010 2020

Edroy first appeared as a census designated place in the 2000 U.S. census.

=== 2020 census ===
Edroy CDP, Texas – Racial and ethnic composition Note: the US Census treats Hispanic/Latino as an ethnic category. This table excludes Latinos from the racial categories and assigns them to a separate category. Hispanics/Latinos may be of any race.
Race / Ethnicity (NH = Non-Hispanic)	Pop 2000	Pop 2010	Pop 2020	% 2000	% 2010	% 2020
White alone (NH)	80	62	115	19.05%	18.73%	27.25%
Black or African American alone (NH)	0	3	3	0.00%	0.91%	0.71%
Native American or Alaska Native alone (NH)	0	0	0	0.00%	0.00%	0.00%
Asian alone (NH)	1	0	1	0.24%	0.00%	0.24%
Native Hawaiian or Pacific Islander alone (NH)	0	0	0	0.00%	0.00%	0.00%
Other race alone (NH)	0	0	0	0.00%	0.00%	0.00%
Mixed race or Multiracial (NH)	0	1	8	0.00%	0.30%	1.90%
Hispanic or Latino (any race)	339	265	295	80.71%	80.06%	69.91%
Total	420	331	422	100.00%	100.00%	100.00%

=== 2000 census ===
As of the census of 2000, there were 420 people, 118 households, and 101 families residing in the CDP. The population density was 201.9 inhabitants per square mile (78.0/km^{2}). There were 142 housing units at an average density of 68.3 per square mile (26.4/km^{2}). The racial makeup of the CDP was 68.57% White, 0.24% Asian, 25.48% from other races, and 5.71% from two or more races. Hispanic or Latino of any race were 80.71% of the population.

There were 118 households, out of which 44.1% had children under the age of 18 living with them, 60.2% were married couples living together, 19.5% had a female householder with no husband present, and 13.6% were non-families. 11.9% of all households were made up of individuals, and 5.9% had someone living alone who was 65 years of age or older. The average household size was 3.56 and the average family size was 3.88.

In the CDP, the population was spread out, with 33.1% under the age of 18, 10.0% from 18 to 24, 27.4% from 25 to 44, 17.1% from 45 to 64, and 12.4% who were 65 years of age or older. The median age was 31 years. For every 100 females, there were 104.9 males. For every 100 females age 18 and over, there were 96.5 males.

The median income for a household in the CDP was $26,000, and the median income for a family was $28,000. Males had a median income of $26,705 versus $17,344 for females. The per capita income for the CDP was $9,787. About 15.6% of families and 13.6% of the population were below the poverty line, including 16.5% of those under age 18 and 19.5% of those age 65 or over.

== Education ==
Edroy is served by the Odem-Edroy Independent School District.

Del Mar College is the designated community college for all of San Patricio County.
