= Ingleside on the Bay, Texas =

- City
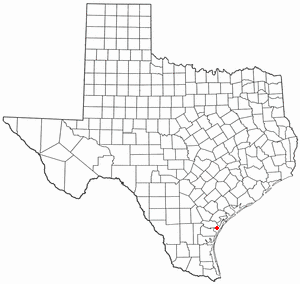
- Location of Ingleside on the Bay, Texas

- Coordinates: 27°49′44″N 97°13′18″W
- Country: United States
- State: Texas
- County: San Patricio
- Established: 1991

Government
  - Mayor: Jo Ann Ehmann

Area
  - Total: 0.31 sq mi (0.79 km^{2})
  - Land: 0.29 sq mi (0.76 km^{2})
  - Water: 0.015 sq mi (0.04 km^{2})
- Elevation: 9.8 ft (3 m)

Population (2020)
  - Total: 614
  - Density: 2,100/sq mi (810/km^{2})
- Time zone: UTC-6 (Central (CST))
  - Summer (DST): UTC-5 (CDT)
- Postal code: 78362
- Area code: 361
- FIPS code: 48-36020
- GNIS feature ID: 1388187
- Website: inglesideonthebaytx.gov

Ingleside on the Bay is a city in San Patricio County, Texas, United States. The population was 614 at the 2020 census.

== Geography ==
Ingleside on the Bay is located at 27°49′44″N 97°13′18″W (27.828753, –97.221723).

According to the United States Census Bureau, the city has a total area of 0.3 square mile (0.8 km^{2}), of which 0.3 square mile (0.8 km^{2}) is land and 3.23% is water.

== Demographics ==
Historical population
Census	Pop.	Note	%±
2000	659		—
2010	615		−6.7%
2020	614		−0.2%
U.S. Decennial Census; 2020 Census

=== 2020 census ===
As of the 2020 census, Ingleside on the Bay had a population of 614. The median age was 54.2 years. 14.8% of residents were under the age of 18 and 30.8% of residents were 65 years of age or older. For every 100 females there were 117.0 males, and for every 100 females age 18 and over there were 114.3 males age 18 and over.

100.0% of residents lived in urban areas, while 0.0% lived in rural areas.

There were 267 households in Ingleside on the Bay, of which 21.3% had children under the age of 18 living in them. Of all households, 58.1% were married-couple households, 23.2% were households with a male householder and no spouse or partner present, and 13.5% were households with a female householder and no spouse or partner present. About 25.1% of all households were made up of individuals and 15.0% had someone living alone who was 65 years of age or older.

There were 348 housing units, of which 23.3% were vacant. The homeowner vacancy rate was 4.1% and the rental vacancy rate was 19.1%.

Racial composition as of the 2020 census
Race	Number	Percent
White	505	82.2%
Black or African American	8	1.3%
American Indian and Alaska Native	13	2.1%
Asian	7	1.1%
Native Hawaiian and Other Pacific Islander	0	0.0%
Some other race	19	3.1%
Two or more races	62	10.1%
Hispanic or Latino (of any race)	99	16.1%

=== 2000 census ===
As of the 2000 census, there were 659 people, 260 households, and 199 families residing in the city. The population density was 2,218.6 inhabitants per square mile (856.6/km^{2}). There were 304 housing units at an average density of 1,023.4 per square mile (395.1/km^{2}). The racial makeup of the city was 90.74% White, 0.46% African American, 0.46% Native American, 0.61% Asian, 5.61% from other races, and 2.12% from two or more races. Hispanic or Latino of any race were 12.14% of the population.

There were 260 households, out of which 28.1% had children under the age of 18 living with them, 68.8% were married couples living together, 5.4% had a female householder with no husband present, and 23.1% were non-families. 18.1% of all households were made up of individuals, and 6.9% had someone living alone who was 65 years of age or older. The average household size was 2.53 and the average family size was 2.87.

In the city, the population was spread out, with 22.3% under the age of 18, 5.2% from 18 to 24, 26.6% from 25 to 44, 32.8% from 45 to 64, and 13.2% who were 65 years of age or older. The median age was 43 years. For every 100 females, there were 104.7 males. For every 100 females age 18 and over, there were 102.4 males.

The median income for a household in the city was $45,500, and the median income for a family was $50,357. Males had a median income of $37,986 versus $22,411 for females. The per capita income for the city was $18,067. About 9.8% of families and 12.4% of the population were below the poverty line, including 14.5% of those under age 18 and 12.0% of those age 65 or over.

== Education ==
Ingleside on the Bay is served by the Ingleside Independent School District.

Del Mar College is the designated community college for all of San Patricio County.
