= Ingleside, Texas =

- City
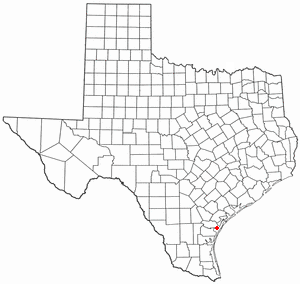
- Location of Ingleside, Texas

- Coordinates: 27°52′27″N 97°12′30″W
- Country: United States
- State: Texas
- Counties: San Patricio, Nueces

Area
  - Total: 16.93 sq mi (43.85 km^{2})
  - Land: 16.82 sq mi (43.57 km^{2})
  - Water: 0.11 sq mi (0.28 km^{2})
- Elevation: 13 ft (4 m)

Population (2020)
  - Total: 9,519
  - Density: 605.8/sq mi (233.91/km^{2})
- Time zone: UTC-6 (Central (CST))
  - Summer (DST): UTC-5 (CDT)
- ZIP code: 78362
- Area code: 361
- FIPS code: 48-36008
- GNIS feature ID: 1338470
- Website: www.inglesidetx.gov

Ingleside is a city primarily in San Patricio County, with small parts in Nueces County, in the U.S. state of Texas. Its population was 9,519 at the 2020 census.

== History ==
Ingleside was founded by George C. Hatch in 1854. Among the original community of Ingleside were Walter Ingalls, Henry Nold, James Aware, John Pollard, John W. Vineyard, and others. The 3,800 acres Hatch acquired was sold to the various residents of the community, and the name "Ingleside" came from John Vineyard whom allegedly named it after his ancestral home in Scotland.

The neighboring town, Ingleside on the Bay, was formed when Corps of Engineering had cut a channel, now known as the Quinta Channel, through Ingleside Point in 1954. This is where the US Navy planned on building its Homeport in 1995.

Ingleside was the home to Naval Station Ingleside. On August 24, 2005, the BRAC Commission voted to close the base. In 2010, the main base property was turned over to the Port of Corpus Christi.

As of March 31, 2023, companies Enbridge and Yara partnered in a joint interest venture named project YaREN which plans to start production in either 2027 or 2028. This project proposed the building of a "world scale low-carbon blue ammonia production facility" which would be located at the Enbridge Ingleside Energy Center (EIEC). This project has faced community backlash and significant publicity by various news publications. As of November 11, 2025 Project YaREN has received permission from the Ingleside City Council to begin construction and production under a special use permit.

== Geography ==
According to the United States Census Bureau, the city has a total area of 14.5 sq mi (37.6 km^{2}), of which 0.1 sq mi (0.3 km^{2}) (0.76%) is covered by water. The city is almost entirely in San Patricio County, with slivers to the southeast in Nueces County.

== Demographics ==
Historical population
Census	Pop.	Note	%±
1960	3,022		—
1970	3,763		24.5%
1980	5,436		44.5%
1990	5,696		4.8%
2000	9,388		64.8%
2010	9,387		0.0%
2020	9,519		1.4%
U.S. Decennial Census 2020

=== 2020 census ===
As of the 2020 census, Ingleside had a population of 9,519, 3,347 households, and 2,417 families residing in the city.

The median age was 34.6 years, 27.4% of residents were under the age of 18, and 12.3% were 65 years of age or older; for every 100 females there were 105.6 males and for every 100 females age 18 and over there were 105.7 males.

85.6% of residents lived in urban areas, while 14.4% lived in rural areas.

Of the 3,347 households in Ingleside, 38.9% had children under the age of 18 living in them, 49.2% were married-couple households, 20.3% were households with a male householder with no spouse or partner present, and 23.1% were households with a female householder with no spouse or partner present; about 22.0% of all households were made up of individuals and 8.7% had someone living alone who was 65 years of age or older.

There were 3,935 housing units, of which 14.9% were vacant; the homeowner vacancy rate was 3.5% and the rental vacancy rate was 21.6%.

Racial composition as of the 2020 census
Race	Number	Percent
White	5,934	62.3%
Black or African American	155	1.6%
American Indian and Alaska Native	94	1.0%
Asian	123	1.3%
Native Hawaiian and Other Pacific Islander	12	0.1%
Some other race	1,113	11.7%
Two or more races	2,088	21.9%
Hispanic or Latino (of any race)	4,530	47.6%

=== 2000 census ===
As of the census of 2000, 9,388 people, 2,980 households, and 2,226 were families residing in the city. The population density was 652.1 people/sq mi (251.7/km^{2}). The 3,268 housing units averaged 227.0/sq mi (87.6/km^{2}). The racial makeup of the city was 77.56% White, 5.60% African American, 0.88% Native American, 1.86% Asian, 0.27% Pacific Islander, 10.18% from other races, and 3.64% from two or more races. Hispanics or Latinos of any race were 27.71% of the population.

Of the 2,980 households, 45.4% had children under 18 living with them, 60.7% were married couples living together, 9.5% had a female householder with no husband present, and 25.3% were not families. About 20.0% of all households were made up of individuals, and 5.5% had someone living alone who was 65 or older. The average household size was 2.87, and the average family size was 3.33.

In the city, the age distribution was 29.8% under 18, 15.9% from 18 to 24, 33.3% from 25 to 44, 15.1% from 45 to 64, and 5.9% who were 65 or older. The median age was 28 years. For every 100 females, there were 119.7 males. For every 100 females age 18 and over, there were 126.6 males.

The median income for a household in the city was $37,789, and for a family was $42,247. Males had a median income of $30,051 versus $20,847 for females. The per capita income for the city was $16,050. About 7.2% of families and 19.2% of the population were below the poverty line, including 12.9% of those under age 18 and 9.8% of those age 65 or over.

== Government ==
The Ingleside city council is responsible for setting tax rates and policies for the town, along with the appointment of the city manager, the city attorney, municipal court of record judge, municipal court of record clerk, and all boards and commission members. As of 2025, the Ingleside mayor is Pedro Oscar Adame, who has held position since 2022.

The Ingleside city manager is responsible for organizing city operations and developments, along with preparation of an annual city budget and development of financial and administrative policies. As of 2025, the Ingleside city manager is Brenton Lewis, who has held position since 2022.

== Economy ==
Kiewit Offshore Services has a 500 acre facility in Ingleside. With its founding in 2001, Kiewit Offshore Services has been the primary contractor for manufacturing and repairing off shore oil and gas platforms for the Kiewit Corporation, which is the primary company that produces gas and oil in the Gulf of Mexico region. Kiewit Offshore Services has been estimated to have a $44.18 million modeled revenue and employees over 1,700 employees, with around 300 staff and 1,400 craft workers as of 2024.

Project YaREN claims that during construction of its facilities there will be "up to 4,000 jobs at the peak of construction" and that "$60 to $80 million in total estimated tax revenue" will be generated around the same period of time for Ingleside and associated areas. Later, when the facility is fully operational Project YaREN has also claimed there will be "up to 200 permanent jobs" an alleged "$15 to $20 million in annual wages" and "Over $1 billion in total tax revenue" for Ingleside and associated areas.

== Arts and culture ==
Ingleside Public Library contains books, media, and access to online services.

== Education ==
Most of the City of Ingleside is served by the Ingleside Independent School District. Small sections are in the Aransas Pass Independent School District.

Emory Bellard, the father of the wishbone offense, began his coaching career at Ingleside High School in 1952, where he would stay until 1954. He led the Mustangs football team to the equivalent of a state championship in 1953 and 1954.

Del Mar College is the designated community college for all of Nueces and San Patricio counties.
