= Lakeside, San Patricio County, Texas =

Lakeside, Texas
- Town
- Location of Lakeside, Texas
- Country: United States
- State: Texas
- County: San Patricio

Area
  - Total: 0.38 sq mi (0.99 km^{2})
  - Land: 0.38 sq mi (0.99 km^{2})
  - Water: 0 sq mi (0.00 km^{2})

Population (2020)
  - Total: 338
  - Density: 880/sq mi (340/km^{2})
- Time zone: UTC-6 (Central (CST))
  - Summer (DST): UTC-5 (CDT)
- FIPS code: 48-40738
- GNIS feature ID: 2412866

Lakeside is a town in San Patricio County, Texas, United States. As of the 2020 census, the town population was 338.

== Geography ==
Lakeside is located at 28°6′19″N 97°51′46″W (28.105254, –97.862722).

According to the United States Census Bureau, the town has a total area of 0.4 square mile (1.0 km^{2}), all land.

== Demographics ==
Historical population
Census	Pop.	Note	%±
1980	276		—
1990	292		5.8%
2000	333		14.0%
2010	312		−6.3%
2020	338		8.3%
U.S. Decennial Census; 2020 Census

As of the census of 2000, there were 333 people, 134 households, and 101 families residing in the town. The population density was 847.9 inhabitants per square mile (327.4/km^{2}). There were 189 housing units at an average density of 481.2 per square mile (185.8/km^{2}). The racial makeup of the town was 90.99% White, 0.60% African American, 0.30% Native American, 0.30% Asian, 0.30% Pacific Islander, 7.51% from other races. Hispanic or Latino of any race were 31.83% of the population.

There were 134 households, out of which 26.1% had children under the age of 18 living with them, 65.7% were married couples living together, 6.7% had a female householder with no husband present, and 23.9% were non-families. 23.1% of all households were made up of individuals, and 14.9% had someone living alone who was 65 years of age or older. The average household size was 2.49 and the average family size was 2.90.

In the town, the population was spread out, with 22.2% under the age of 18, 8.1% from 18 to 24, 22.5% from 25 to 44, 21.9% from 45 to 64, and 25.2% who were 65 years of age or older. The median age was 43 years. For every 100 females, there were 100.6 males. For every 100 females age 18 and over, there were 94.7 males.

The median income for a household in the town was $31,806, and the median income for a family was $42,500. Males had a median income of $31,250 versus $22,917 for females. The per capita income for the town was $15,908. About 15.6% of families and 28.3% of the population were below the poverty line, including 57.8% of those under age 18 and 4.4% of those age 65 or over.

== Education ==
The Town of Lakeside is served by the Mathis Independent School District.

Del Mar College is the designated community college for all of San Patricio County.
