= Sinton Independent School District =

School district in Texas, United States

Address
- 322 South Archer Sinton, Texas, 78387; United States

District information
- Grades: PK–12
- Schools: 5
- NCES District ID: 4840350

Students and staff
- Students: 2,023 (2023–2024)
- Teachers: 155.62 (on an FTE basis)
- Student–teacher ratio: 13.00:1

Other information
- Website: www.sintonisd.net

Sinton Independent School District is a public school district based in Sinton, Texas, United States.

Sinton is located in San Patricio County. Less than 30 miles (48 km) north of Corpus Christi, it is situated close to the Gulf of Mexico and the amenities of an urban area. Many churches, representing various denominations are located in Sinton, and have access to nearby healthcare facilities. Texas A&M University–Corpus Christi provides higher education opportunities.

Sinton ISD has an enrollment of approximately 2,000–2,100 students across its 200+ square mile area. Students attend classes on one of five campuses, including Sinton High School, E. Merle Smith Middle School, Sinton Elementary, Welder Elementary, and the Dave Odem Learning Center (alternative education campus). 78.7% of the student body is Hispanic, 19.8% is White, with the remaining 1.5% consisting of Black, Asian, and Native American students.

Academically, Sinton ISD has performed well and is a state of Texas "Recognized" district. The elementary grades employ a variety of teaching strategies and curricula, including Balanced Literacy, Accelerated Reader, and Reading Renaissance. The Talent Pool program enriches potentially gifted students in all content areas.

In 2009 and 2010, the school district was rated "Recognized" by the Texas Education Agency.

In addition to Sinton, the district also serves the communities of Del Sol, La Paloma Addition, Morgan Farm (formerly Morgan Farm Area), Rancho Chico, and St. Paul. Del Sol and Loma Linda were formerly in a single census-designated place, Del Sol-Loma Linda.

== Schools ==
- Sinton High School (Grades 9-12)
- E. Merle Smith Middle School (Grades 6-8)
- Sinton Elementary (Grades 3-5)
- Welder Elementary (Grades PK-2)
- Dave Odem Learning Center
