= Morgan Farm, Texas =

- CDP
- Coordinates: 28°0′34″N 97°32′46″W
- Country: United States
- State: Texas
- County: San Patricio

Area
  - Total: 3.3 sq mi (8.6 km^{2})
  - Land: 3.3 sq mi (8.6 km^{2})
  - Water: 0 sq mi (0.0 km^{2})
- Elevation: 52 ft (16 m)

Population (2020)
  - Total: 573
  - Density: 170/sq mi (67/km^{2})
- Time zone: UTC-6 (Central (CST))
  - Summer (DST): UTC-5 (CDT)
- FIPS code: 48-49362
- GNIS feature ID: 1852738

Morgan Farm is a census-designated place (CDP) in San Patricio County, Texas, United States. The population was 573 at the 2020 census. Prior to the 2010 census, Morgan Farm CDP was known as Morgan Farm Area CDP.

== Geography ==
Morgan Farm is located at 28°0′34″N 97°32′46″W (28.009561, −97.545978).

According to the United States Census Bureau, the CDP has a total area of 3.3 square miles (8.5 km^{2}), all land.

== Demographics ==
Historical population
Census	Pop.	Note	%±
2000	484		—
2010	463		−4.3%
2020	573		23.8%
U.S. Decennial Census; 1850–1900 1910; 1920 1930 1940; 1950 1960 1970; 1980 1990 2000; 2010 2020

Morgan Farm first appeared as a census designated place under the name Morgan Farm Area in the 2000 U.S. census. The name was change to Morgan Farm in the 2010 U.S. census.

=== 2020 census ===
Morgan Farm CDP, Texas – Racial and ethnic composition Note: the US Census treats Hispanic/Latino as an ethnic category. This table excludes Latinos from the racial categories and assigns them to a separate category. Hispanics/Latinos may be of any race.
Race / Ethnicity (NH = Non-Hispanic)	Pop 2000	Pop 2010	Pop 2020	% 2000	% 2010	% 2020
White alone (NH)	159	124	137	32.85%	26.78%	23.91%
Black or African American alone (NH)	21	4	4	4.34%	0.86%	0.70%
Native American or Alaska Native alone (NH)	2	2	0	0.41%	0.43%	0.00%
Asian alone (NH)	0	1	0	0.00%	0.22%	0.00%
Native Hawaiian or Pacific Islander alone (NH)	1	0	0	0.21%	0.00%	0.00%
Other race alone (NH)	2	1	1	0.41%	0.22%	0.17%
Mixed race or Multiracial (NH)	0	0	7	0.00%	0.00%	1.22%
Hispanic or Latino (any race)	299	331	424	61.78%	71.49%	74.00%
Total	484	463	573	100.00%	100.00%	100.00%

=== 2000 census ===
As of the census of 2000, there were 484 people, 144 households, and 123 families residing in the CDP. The population density was 145.0 people per square mile (56.0 people/km^{2}). There were 170 housing units at an average density of 50.9 per square mile (19.7/km^{2}). The racial makeup of the CDP was 72.31% White, 4.96% African American, 0.41% Native American, 0.21% Pacific Islander, 19.01% from other races, and 3.10% from two or more races. Hispanic or Latino of any race were 61.78% of the population.

There were 144 households, out of which 44.4% had children under the age of 18 living with them, 64.6% were married couples living together, 15.3% had a female householder with no husband present, and 13.9% were non-families. 11.8% of all households were made up of individuals, and 4.2% had someone living alone who was 65 years of age or older. The average household size was 3.36 and the average family size was 3.65.

In the CDP, the population was spread out, with 33.9% under the age of 18, 12.0% from 18 to 24, 26.7% from 25 to 44, 21.1% from 45 to 64, and 6.4% who were 65 years of age or older. The median age was 30 years. For every 100 females, there were 102.5 males. For every 100 females age 18 and over, there were 102.5 males.

The median income for a household in the CDP was $48,500, and the median income for a family was $34,583. Males had a median income of $46,000 versus $21,354 for females. The per capita income for the CDP was $13,443. About 6.7% of families and 19.1% of the population were below the poverty line, including 35.2% of those under age 18 and 14.3% of those age 65 or over.

== Education ==
Morgan Farm is served by the Sinton Independent School District.

Del Mar College is the designated community college for all of San Patricio County.
