= San Patricio County, Texas =

County in Texas, United States

- County
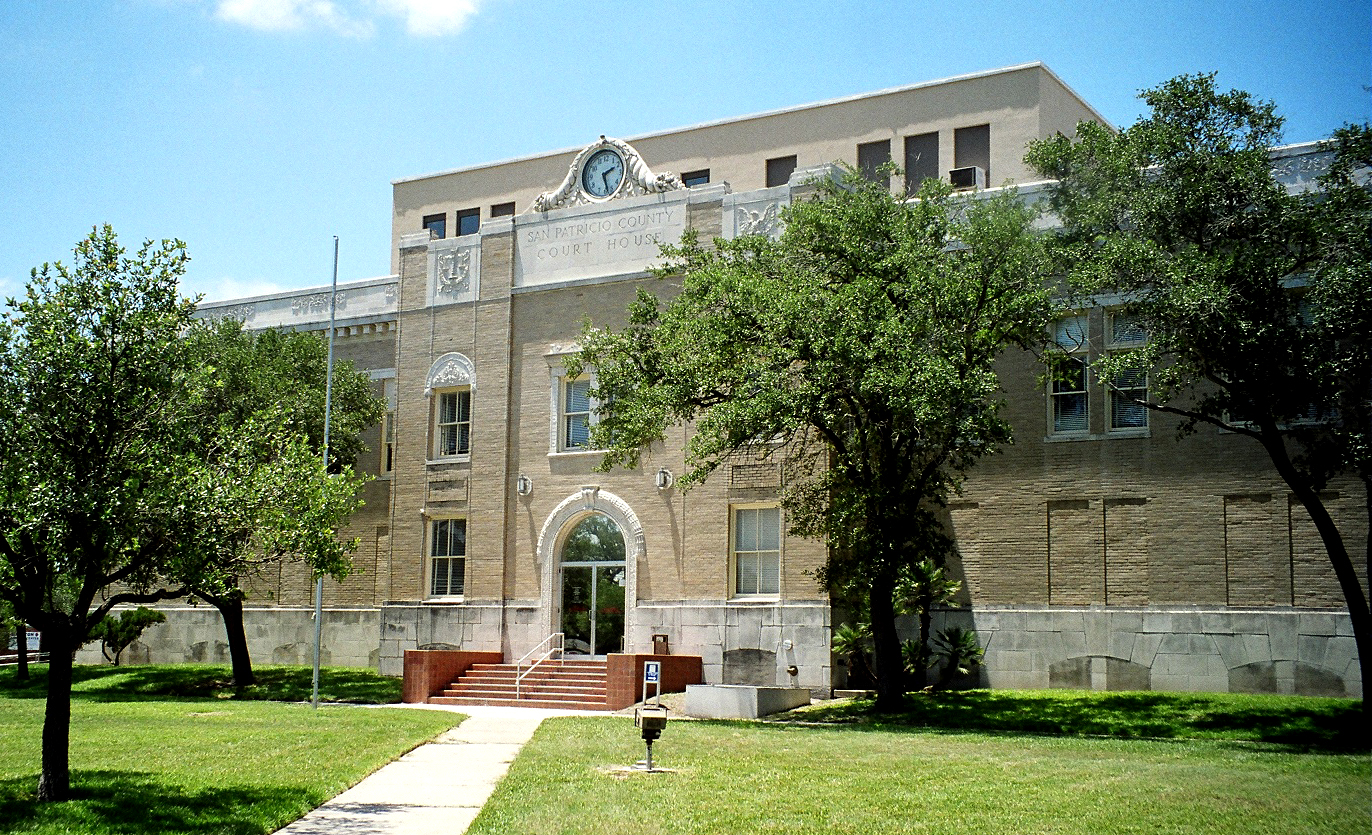
- Built in 1927 (Henry T. Phelps), this is the eighth structure to serve as the San Patricio County Courthouse in Sinton.

- Location within the U.S. state of Texas
- Coordinates: 28°01′N 97°31′W
- Country: United States
- State: Texas
- Founded: 1836
- Named for: Saint Patrick
- Seat: Sinton
- Largest city: Portland

Area
  - Total: 708 sq mi (1,830 km^{2})
  - Land: 693 sq mi (1,790 km^{2})
  - Water: 14 sq mi (36 km^{2}) 2.0%

Population (2020)
  - Total: 68,755
  - Estimate (2025): 72,053 ▲
  - Density: 99.2/sq mi (38.3/km^{2})
- Time zone: UTC−6 (Central)
  - Summer (DST): UTC−5 (CDT)
- Congressional district: 27th
- Website: www.sanpatriciocountytx.gov

San Patricio County is located in the U.S. state of Texas in the Coastal Bend. As of the 2020 census, its population was 68,755. Its county seat is Sinton. San Patricio County is part of the Corpus Christi metropolitan area.

== History ==
In 1828, 200 Irish Catholic families, recruited from Ireland and the Irish population of New York City, contracted with the Mexican government to settle on 80 leagues of land in this area. By 1836, about 500 people lived in the colony on 84 Mexican land grants. During the Texas Revolution, most fled from the colony because of fighting in the area. By 1841, a small number of permanent residents had returned. When Texas was admitted by treaty to the United States in 1845, the area was stabilized by the presence of U.S. troops under General Zachary Taylor. In 1845, the county was formed (San Patricio is Spanish for Saint Patrick, the primary patron saint of the colonists' home country of Ireland), and Corpus Christi was designated as the county seat. The following year, the county south of the Nueces River was reorganized as Nueces County, and the town of San Patricio became the county seat of San Patricio County. In 1848, additional counties were formed out of San Patricio, which further reduced its size.

The 1850 U.S. census listed only 200 people in the county, including three slaves. The local economy was based on cattle raising. In the mid-1860s, more settlers moved, drawn by the cheap land. By 1870, 602 people lived in the county, and the agricultural census reported 51 farms and ranches, totaling 52,000 acres (210 km^{2}), in the area, with about 2,400 acres (9.7 km^{2}) described as "improved". Development of the county intensified during the early 20th century, as hundreds of farmers moved in from North Texas and other states. The population reached 7,307 by 1910, and was 11,386 by 1920; 470 farms were counted in 1910, and 757 farms in 1920. Cattle ranching remained important, but vegetables and cotton also became important. The acres planted in the cotton increased from about 15,000 acres (61 km^{2}) in 1910 to 155,000 acres (630 km^{2}) by 1930.

== Geography ==
According to the U.S. Census Bureau, the county has a total area of 708 sq mi (1,830 km^{2}), of which 693 sq mi (1,790 km^{2}) are land and 14 sq mi (36 km^{2}) (2.0%) are covered by water. Elevations range from sea level to 200 ft, primarily in the western territory. San Patricio County is the 52nd-largest county in Texas. The Gulf of Mexico forms the eastern border of the county.

=== Major highways ===
- Interstate 37
- U.S. Highway 77
  - Interstate 69E is currently under construction and will follow the current route of U.S. 77 in most places.
- U.S. Highway 181
- State Highway 35
- State Highway 89
- State Highway 188
- State Highway 359
- State Highway 361
- Loop 90
- Spur 202
- Spur 459
- Farm to Market Road 136

=== Adjacent counties ===
- Bee County (north)
- Refugio County (northeast)
- Aransas County (east)
- Nueces County (southeast)
- Jim Wells County (southwest)
- Live Oak County (northwest)

== Demographics ==
Historical population
Census	Pop.	Note	%±
1850	200		—
1860	620		210.0%
1870	602		−2.9%
1880	1,010		67.8%
1890	1,312		29.9%
1900	2,372		80.8%
1910	7,307		208.1%
1920	11,386		55.8%
1930	23,836		109.3%
1940	28,871		21.1%
1950	35,842		24.1%
1960	45,021		25.6%
1970	47,288		5.0%
1980	58,013		22.7%
1990	58,749		1.3%
2000	67,138		14.3%
2010	64,804		−3.5%
2020	68,755		6.1%
2025 (est.)	72,053	▲	4.8%
U.S. Decennial Census; 1850–2010 2010–2014

=== Racial and ethnic composition ===
San Patricio County, Texas – Racial and ethnic composition Note: the US Census treats Hispanic/Latino as an ethnic category. This table excludes Latinos from the racial categories and assigns them to a separate category. Hispanics/Latinos may be of any race.
Race / Ethnicity (NH = Non-Hispanic)	Pop 1980	Pop 1990	Pop 2000	Pop 2010	Pop 2020	% 1980	% 1990	% 2000	% 2010	% 2020
White alone (NH)	29,931	27,669	30,749	27,330	26,613	51.59%	47.10%	45.80%	42.17%	38.71%
Black or African American alone (NH)	837	863	1,767	902	994	1.44%	1.47%	2.63%	1.39%	1.45%
Native American or Alaska Native alone (NH)	133	150	233	169	198	0.23%	0.26%	0.35%	0.26%	0.29%
Asian alone (NH)	122	113	389	506	845	0.21%	0.19%	0.58%	0.78%	1.23%
Native Hawaiian or Pacific Islander alone (NH)	x	x	58	46	66	x	x	0.09%	0.07%	0.10%
Other race alone (NH)	118	145	78	53	227	0.20%	0.25%	0.12%	0.08%	0.33%
Mixed race or Multiracial (NH)	x	x	683	550	1,592	x	x	1.02%	0.85%	2.32%
Hispanic or Latino (any race)	26,872	29,809	33,181	35,248	38,220	46.32%	50.74%	49.42%	54.39%	55.59%
Total	58,013	58,749	67,138	64,804	68,755	100.00%	100.00%	100.00%	100.00%	100.00%

=== 2020 census ===
As of the 2020 census, the county had a population of 68,755. The median age was 37.9 years. 25.3% of residents were under the age of 18 and 16.2% of residents were 65 years of age or older. For every 100 females there were 101.2 males, and for every 100 females age 18 and over there were 100.0 males age 18 and over.

The racial makeup of the county was 61.4% White, 1.7% Black or African American, 0.8% American Indian and Alaska Native, 1.3% Asian, 0.1% Native Hawaiian and Pacific Islander, 11.3% from some other race, and 23.4% from two or more races. Hispanic or Latino residents of any race comprised 55.6% of the population.

72.2% of residents lived in urban areas, while 27.8% lived in rural areas.

There were 24,796 households and 16,838 families in the county, of which 35.0% had children under the age of 18 living in them. Of all households, 49.5% were married-couple households, 19.6% were households with a male householder and no spouse or partner present, and 24.2% were households with a female householder and no spouse or partner present. About 23.2% of all households were made up of individuals and 10.1% had someone living alone who was 65 years of age or older.

There were 29,424 housing units, of which 15.7% were vacant. Among occupied housing units, 67.4% were owner-occupied and 32.6% were renter-occupied. The homeowner vacancy rate was 2.2% and the rental vacancy rate was 17.0%.

=== 2000 census ===
As of the 2000 census 67,138 people, 22,093 households, and 17,232 families resided in the county. The population density was 97 people/mi^{2} (37 people/km^{2}). The 24,864 housing units averaged 36 units per square mile (14 units/km^{2}). The racial makeup of the county was 76.76% White, 2.81% African American, 0.70% Native American, 0.63% Asian, 0.11% Pacific Islander, 15.94% from other races, and 3.05% from two or more races. About 49.42% of the population was Hispanic or Latino of any race.

Of the 22,093 households, 41.6% had children under 18 living with them, 60.6% were married couples living together, 12.7% had a female householder with no husband present, and 22.0% were not families. About 18.7% of all households were made up of individuals, and 8.0% had someone living alone who was 65 or older. The average household size was 2.97, and the average family size was 3.40.

In the county, the age distribution was 31.1% under 18, 10.0% from 18 to 24, 28.2% from 25 to 44, 20.2% from 45 to 64, and 10.5% who were 65 or older. The median age was 32 years. For every 100 females, there were 100.50 males. For every 100 females age 18 and over, there were 98.30 males.

The median income for a household in the county was $34,836, and for a family was $40,002. Males had a median income of $31,132 versus $20,730 for females. The per capita income for the county was $15,425. About 14.60% of families and 18.00% of the population were below the poverty line, including 23.50% of those under age 18 and 16.80% of those age 65 or over.

== Communities ==
=== Cities (multiple counties) ===
- Aransas Pass (partly in Aransas and Nueces Counties)
- Corpus Christi (mostly in Nueces County, with small parts in Kleberg and Aransas Counties)
- Ingleside (small part in Nueces County)
- Portland (small part in Nueces County)
- San Patricio (small part in Nueces County)

=== Cities ===
- Gregory
- Ingleside on the Bay
- Mathis
- Odem
- Sinton (county seat)
- Taft

=== Towns ===
- Lake City
- Lakeside

=== Census-designated places ===
- Del Sol
- Edgewater Estates
- Edroy
- Falman
- La Paloma Addition
- Lakeshore Gardens-Hidden Acres
- Loma Linda
- Morgan Farm
- Paisano Park
- Rancho Chico
- St. Paul
- Taft Southwest
- Tradewinds

=== Former census-designated places ===
- Del Sol-Loma Linda
- Doyle
- Country Acres (annexed in 2022 by city of Aransas Pass)
- Edgewater-Paisano
- Falman-County Acres

=== Unincorporated community ===
- Sodville

== Education ==
School districts include:

- Aransas Pass Independent School District
- Gregory-Portland Independent School District
- Ingleside Independent School District
- Mathis Independent School District
- Odem-Edroy Independent School District
- Sinton Independent School District
- Skidmore-Tynan Independent School District
- Taft Independent School District

Del Mar College is the designated community college for all of San Patricio County.

== Government and politics ==
=== Government ===
San Patricio County, like all counties in Texas, is governed by a commissioners' court. This court consists of the county judge (the chairperson of the court), who is elected county-wide, and four commissioners who are elected by the voters in each of four precincts.

The commissioners' court is the policy-making body for the county; in addition, the county judge is the senior executive and administrative position in the county. The commissioners' court sets the county tax rate, adopts the budget, appoints boards and commissions, approves grants and personnel actions, and oversees the administration of county government. Each commissioner also supervises a road and bridge district.

==== County commissioners ====
Office	Name	Party
County judge	David Krebs	Republican
Commissioner, Precinct 1	William "Ski" Zagorski	Republican
Commissioner, Precinct 2	Tom Yardley	Republican
Commissioner, Precinct 3	Ruben Gonzales	Republican
Commissioner, Precinct 4	Howard Gillespie	Republican

==== County officials ====
Office	Name	Party
County attorney	Tamera Cochran-May	Republican
County clerk	Gracie Alaniz-Gonzales	Democratic
District attorney	Margie Silva Flores	Republican
District clerk	Heather Marks	Republican
Sheriff	Oscar Riveria	Republican
Tax assessor-collector	Marcela Thormaehlen	Republican
Treasurer	April Garcia	Republican

==== Constables ====
Office	Name	Party
Constable, Precinct 1	Steve Hutchins	Republican
Constable, Precinct 2	Franciso Cantu	Democratic
Constable, Precinct 4	Paul Good	Republican
Constable, Precinct 5	Sean Orsak	Republican
Constable, Precinct 6	Kody Fahrenthold	Republican
Constable, Precinct 8	James Easley	Republican

==== Justices of the peace ====
Office	Name	Party
Justice of the peace, Precinct 1	Leslie DeAses	Republican
Justice of the peace, Precinct 2	Danny Garza	Democratic
Justice of the peace, Precinct 4	Karen Diaz	Republican
Justice of the peace, Precinct 5	Nere Villarreal	Democratic
Justice of the peace, Precinct 6	Susan Price	Republican
Justice of the peace, Precinct 8	Leslie Pullin	Republican

==== County courts ====
Office	Name	Party
County Court at Law No. 1	Elizabeth Welborn	Republican
County Court at Law No. 2	Viki Hesseltine Martino	Republican

=== District courts ===
Office	Name	Party
36th District Court	Starr Bauer	Republican
156th District Court	Patrick L. Flanigan	Republican
343rd District Court	Jana Whatley	Republican

=== Politics ===
Despite being majority-minority, San Patricio county leans overwhelmingly Republican. The GOP does better than average among Latino residents in Texas, particularly South Texas. In 2022, Republicans won 40% of the Latino vote. This has been as high as 48% in 2014. These margins help Republicans win majority-minority districts, while Republicans in other parts of the country struggle - only garnering between 21% and 30% of the vote. Republicans appear to be increasing their Latino support from picking off specific segments: Men, rural Latinos, Rio Grande Valley, devout Catholics, Tejano, and pro-life voters.

United States presidential election results for San Patricio County, Texas
Year	Republican		Democratic		Third party(ies)	
Year	No.	%	No.	%	No.	%
1912	175	19.60%	551	61.70%	167	18.70%
1916	130	16.31%	594	74.53%	73	9.16%
1920	308	32.25%	620	64.92%	27	2.83%
1924	987	45.63%	1,097	50.72%	79	3.65%
1928	1,388	70.56%	579	29.44%	0	0.00%
1932	407	15.86%	2,142	83.48%	17	0.66%
1936	482	17.69%	2,213	81.21%	30	1.10%
1940	980	24.73%	2,963	74.77%	20	0.50%
1944	878	22.86%	2,712	70.61%	251	6.53%
1948	963	25.19%	2,649	69.29%	211	5.52%
1952	3,220	49.24%	3,315	50.69%	5	0.08%
1956	3,302	46.82%	3,728	52.86%	22	0.31%
1960	3,129	37.29%	5,246	62.52%	16	0.19%
1964	2,188	23.32%	7,176	76.47%	20	0.21%
1968	3,717	29.95%	6,818	54.94%	1,876	15.12%
1972	7,179	57.42%	5,097	40.77%	226	1.81%
1976	5,853	38.02%	9,469	61.51%	73	0.47%
1980	8,326	47.59%	8,627	49.31%	541	3.09%
1984	11,074	55.48%	8,838	44.27%	50	0.25%
1988	9,159	47.07%	9,920	50.98%	379	1.95%
1992	7,456	39.48%	8,202	43.43%	3,229	17.10%
1996	7,678	45.21%	8,132	47.88%	1,173	6.91%
2000	10,599	56.68%	7,840	41.93%	260	1.39%
2004	13,474	63.20%	7,764	36.42%	82	0.38%
2008	12,404	57.97%	8,854	41.38%	138	0.64%
2012	12,005	59.79%	7,856	39.13%	217	1.08%
2016	13,030	60.17%	7,871	36.35%	755	3.49%
2020	16,516	63.79%	8,988	34.71%	387	1.49%
2024	17,337	67.78%	8,025	31.37%	217	0.85%

United States Senate election results for San Patricio County, Texas1
Year	Republican		Democratic		Third party(ies)	
Year	No.	%	No.	%	No.	%
2024	16,116	63.65%	8,578	33.88%	627	2.48%

United States Senate election results for San Patricio County, Texas2
Year	Republican		Democratic		Third party(ies)	
Year	No.	%	No.	%	No.	%
2020	16,174	63.91%	8,484	33.53%	648	2.56%

Texas Gubernatorial election results for San Patricio County
Year	Republican		Democratic		Third party(ies)	
Year	No.	%	No.	%	No.	%
2022	12,028	67.20%	5,643	31.53%	227	1.27%

== See also ==
- Port of Corpus Christi
- National Register of Historic Places listings in San Patricio County, Texas
- Recorded Texas Historic Landmarks in San Patricio County
