= Sinton, Texas =

- City
- Nickname: City of Parks
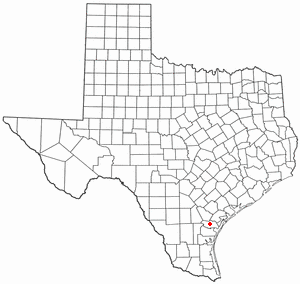
- Location of Sinton, Texas

- Coordinates: 28°2′5″N 97°30′32″W
- Country: United States
- State: Texas
- County: San Patricio
- Named for: David Sinton

Government
  - Type: Council–manager government
  - City council: Mayor Mary Speidel; Mayor Pro Tem Greg Ybarra; Edward Adams; LuLu Lopez; Nathan Lindeman
  - City manager: John Hobson

Area
  - Total: 2.97 sq mi (7.70 km^{2})
  - Land: 2.96 sq mi (7.67 km^{2})
  - Water: 0.012 sq mi (0.03 km^{2})
- Elevation: 49 ft (15 m)

Population (2020)
  - Total: 5,504
  - Density: 1,858.2/sq mi (717.46/km^{2})
- Time zone: UTC-6 (Central (CST))
  - Summer (DST): UTC-5 (CDT)
- ZIP Code: 78387
- Area code: 361
- FIPS code: 48-68036
- GNIS feature ID: 1347172
- Website: www.sintontexas.org

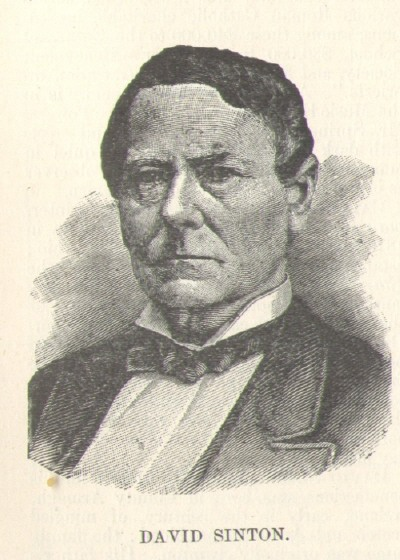
David Sinton, after whom Sinton is named

Sinton is a city in and the county seat of San Patricio County, Texas, United States. Its population was 5,504 at the 2020 census. It was founded in 1886 and was named in honor of David Sinton, an influential business owner and rancher.

== Geography ==
Sinton is located at 28°2′5″N 97°30′32″W (28.034824, –97.508942).

According to the United States Census Bureau, the city has a total area of 2.2 square miles (5.7 km^{2}), all land.

=== Climate ===
The climate in this area is characterized by hot, humid summers and generally mild to cool winters. Sinton has a humid subtropical climate, Cfa according to the Köppen climate classification system.

Climate data for Sinton, Texas (1991–2020 normals, extremes 1958–1985, 1989–2018)
Month	Jan	Feb	Mar	Apr	May	Jun	Jul	Aug	Sep	Oct	Nov	Dec	Year
Record high °F (°C)	92 (33)	94 (34)	103 (39)	105 (41)	104 (40)	107 (42)	105 (41)	108 (42)	109 (43)	98 (37)	93 (34)	90 (32)	109 (43)
Mean daily maximum °F (°C)	66.4 (19.1)	70.2 (21.2)	75.4 (24.1)	80.8 (27.1)	86.0 (30.0)	91.0 (32.8)	92.8 (33.8)	94.6 (34.8)	90.3 (32.4)	84.5 (29.2)	75.4 (24.1)	68.2 (20.1)	81.3 (27.4)
Daily mean °F (°C)	55.7 (13.2)	59.8 (15.4)	65.4 (18.6)	71.2 (21.8)	77.6 (25.3)	82.7 (28.2)	84.4 (29.1)	85.2 (29.6)	80.9 (27.2)	73.7 (23.2)	64.5 (18.1)	57.4 (14.1)	71.5 (21.9)
Mean daily minimum °F (°C)	44.9 (7.2)	49.4 (9.7)	55.5 (13.1)	61.6 (16.4)	69.2 (20.7)	74.4 (23.6)	76.0 (24.4)	75.9 (24.4)	71.4 (21.9)	62.9 (17.2)	53.6 (12.0)	46.5 (8.1)	61.8 (16.6)
Record low °F (°C)	11 (−12)	21 (−6)	18 (−8)	32 (0)	44 (7)	58 (14)	63 (17)	62 (17)	50 (10)	31 (−1)	25 (−4)	10 (−12)	10 (−12)
Average precipitation inches (mm)	1.65 (42)	1.85 (47)	2.44 (62)	1.83 (46)	3.26 (83)	3.41 (87)	2.80 (71)	2.47 (63)	5.28 (134)	3.86 (98)	2.41 (61)	1.70 (43)	32.96 (837)
Average snowfall inches (cm)	0.0 (0.0)	0.0 (0.0)	0.0 (0.0)	0.0 (0.0)	0.0 (0.0)	0.0 (0.0)	0.0 (0.0)	0.0 (0.0)	0.0 (0.0)	0.0 (0.0)	0.0 (0.0)	0.4 (1.0)	0.4 (1.0)
Average precipitation days (≥ 0.01 in)	4.7	4.9	5.0	3.6	4.7	4.3	4.1	4.5	7.5	4.9	4.2	4.5	56.9
Average snowy days (≥ 0.1 in)	0.0	0.0	0.0	0.0	0.0	0.0	0.0	0.0	0.0	0.0	0.0	0.1	0.1
Source: NOAA

== Demographics ==
Historical population
Census	Pop.	Note	%±
1920	1,058		—
1930	1,852		75.0%
1940	3,770		103.6%
1950	4,254		12.8%
1960	6,008		41.2%
1970	5,563		−7.4%
1980	6,044		8.6%
1990	5,549		−8.2%
2000	5,676		2.3%
2010	5,665		−0.2%
2020	5,504		−2.8%
U.S. Decennial Census

=== 2020 census ===
As of the 2020 census, Sinton had a population of 5,504 in 1,922 households, including 1,199 families. The median age was 36.8 years. 25.3% of residents were under the age of 18 and 16.0% of residents were 65 years of age or older. For every 100 females there were 95.2 males, and for every 100 females age 18 and over there were 94.5 males age 18 or over.

96.8% of residents lived in urban areas, while 3.2% lived in rural areas.

There were 1,922 households in Sinton, of which 34.4% had children under the age of 18 living in them. Of all households, 39.9% were married-couple households, 19.1% were households with a male householder and no spouse or partner present, and 32.9% were households with a female householder and no spouse or partner present. About 26.4% of all households were made up of individuals and 12.4% had someone living alone who was 65 years of age or older.

There were 2,179 housing units, of which 11.8% were vacant. The homeowner vacancy rate was 0.8% and the rental vacancy rate was 8.6%.

Racial composition as of the 2020 census
Race	Number	Percent
White	3,003	54.6%
Black or African American	144	2.6%
American Indian and Alaska Native	32	0.6%
Asian	33	0.6%
Native Hawaiian and Other Pacific Islander	5	0.1%
Some other race	770	14.0%
Two or more races	1,517	27.6%
Hispanic or Latino (of any race)	4,187	76.1%

=== 2010 census ===
As of the 2010 census 5,723 people, 1,845 households, and 1,409 families resided in the city. The population density was 2,582.0 inhabitants per square mile (996.9/km^{2}). The 2,026 housing units averaged 921.6 per sq mi (355.6/km^{2}). The racial makeup of the city was 73.47% White, 3.63% African American, 0.93% Native American, 0.04% Asian, 0.09% Pacific Islander, 18.48% from other races, and 3.37% from two or more races. Hispanics of any race were 71.04% of the population.

Of the 1,845 households, 39.3% had children under 18 living with them, 50.8% were married couples living together, 18.9% had a female householder with no husband present, and 23.6% were not families. About 21.4% of all households were made up of individuals, and 11.5% had someone living alone who was 65 or older. The average household size was 2.89 and the average family size was 3.35.

In the city, the population was distributed as 30.0% under 18, 10.0% from 18 to 24, 27.2% from 25 to 44, 19.3% from 45 to 64, and 13.5% who were 65 or older. The median age was 32 years. For every 100 females, there were 100.6 males. For every 100 females age 18 and over, there were 96.3 males age 18 and over.

The median income for a household in the city was $27,911, and for a family was $32,266. Males had a median income of $25,331 versus $17,163 for females. The per capita income for the city was $12,881. About 22.4% of families and 28.0% of the population were below the poverty line, including 38.3% of those under age 18 and 21.8% of those age 65 or over.

== History ==
Sinton was established in the late 19th century after the San Antonio and Aransas Pass Railway extended into San Patricio County in 1886. Colonel George W. Fulton, representing the Coleman-Fulton Pasture Company, donated land along Chiltipin Creek for the creation of a new town, which was named after David Sinton, a major shareholder in the company. A post office was opened in 1888, though it was discontinued just 4 years later. By 1894, the town had been officially organized and chosen as the county seat.

Early growth was limited, but expanded in the early 20th century when railroad access and targeted promotions drew settlers from the Midwest and various regions of Texas. Agriculture—especially vegetable farming—and cattle ranching drove the local economy, and the town began to develop infrastructure, including businesses, a bank, a hotel, and a newspaper. Sinton was incorporated in 1916, and after World War I, a wave of construction brought new brick buildings to the main commercial district. A major turning point came with the discovery of oil near the town in 1935. The Plymouth Oil Company established its headquarters in Sinton, bringing economic activity and new jobs. Post–World War II development further stimulated population growth as new residential neighborhoods and commercial enterprises were established. Agricultural production also evolved during this time, with sorghum, cotton, and corn replacing vegetables as dominant crops, while ranching remained important in surrounding rural areas.

By the mid-20th century, Sinton had become a center for regional agriculture and the petroleum industry. It hosted facilities such as the Rural Electrification Administration office and a Dr Pepper bottling plant. Community life featured events such as the San Patricio County Agricultural and Homemakers Show, the Old Fiddlers Parade, and the youth rodeo. The Rob and Bessie Welder Wildlife Park, encompassing 3,000 acres, provided additional recreational space.

== Government ==
=== City Council ===
The legislative and governing body of the city shall consist of five (5) members elected by majority vote by place number from the city at large for four (4) year term and shall be known as the City Council of the City of Sinton. Newly elected council members take office at the first meeting after the election, or after a run-off if required. At that meeting, the council elects a mayor and mayor pro tempore from among its members, with both positions elected annually in May. They serve one-year terms or until successors are elected. The mayor presides over council meetings, serves as the ceremonial head of the city, signs official documents, and may vote but has no veto power. The mayor pro tempore acts in the mayor’s place when the mayor is absent or unable to serve.

Office	Name
Council Place 1	Edward Adams
Council Place 2	Nathan Lindeman
Mayor Pro Tem, Council Place 3	Greg Ybarra
Council Place 4	LuLu Lopez
Mayor, Council Place 5	Mary Speidel

== Education ==
The City of Sinton is served by the Sinton Independent School District. The district's comprehensive high school is Sinton High School.

== Sports ==
From 1948 to 1958, Sinton was the home to the Plymouth Oilers, a semiprofessional baseball team sponsored by Plymouth Oil Company, which had extensive drilling operations on the Welder Ranch, north of the city. The team hired star college players for the summer and gave them jobs in the field, gas plant, and office. Experienced players were hired on a permanent basis. By 1950, the Oilers were playing a 46-game schedule, going 33–13 and placing fourth in the National Baseball Congress national, semipro tournament. In 1951, the Oilers returned to the national championship after winning the state title in Oiler Park before a record crowd of 2,304. At the national tournament in Wichita against the Camp Pickett (Virginia) Red Wings, Oiler pitcher Mike Blyzka turned in a no-hit, no-run game (5–0), the second in tournament history. The Oilers then defeated Atwater (California) 3–0 to win the national championship, the first Texas team to do so, They returned to nationals in 1952, 1954, 1955, 1956, and 1957, placing second in 1955. In 1957, the National Baseball Congress declared Sinton, Texas, the premier city in the nation, per capita, for promoting semipro baseball for nearly a decade. In the spring of 1958, the Plymouth Oil Company, citing economic conditions, ended its support of the Oilers, and the team disbanded.
