= Odem, Texas =

- City
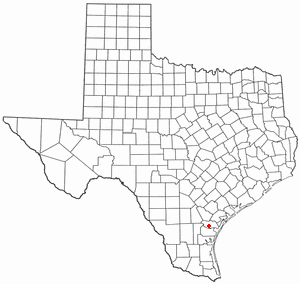
- Location of Odem, Texas

- Coordinates: 27°56′52″N 97°35′3″W
- Country: United States
- State: Texas
- County: San Patricio

Government
  - Mayor: David Bargas Maldonado (D)
  - City Council: Billy V. Huerta Becky Veit Isaac Dominguez Jesse Falcon Virginia Garza

Area
  - Total: 1.27 sq mi (3.30 km^{2})
  - Land: 1.27 sq mi (3.30 km^{2})
  - Water: 0 sq mi (0.00 km^{2})
- Elevation: 72 ft (22 m)

Population (2020)
  - Total: 2,255
  - Density: 1,770/sq mi (683/km^{2})
- Time zone: UTC-6 (Central (CST))
  - Summer (DST): UTC-5 (CDT)
- ZIP code: 78370
- Area code: 361
- FIPS code: 48-53376
- GNIS feature ID: 1343063
- Website: www.cityofodemtx.com

Odem is a city in San Patricio County, Texas, United States. Its population was 2,255 at the 2020 census.

== History ==
The city was platted in 1909 by John James Welder and David Odem. It was named for Odem, who was the county sheriff.

== List of Mayors ==
Name	Term
David B. Maldonado	2023-present
Virginia “Vicky” Garza	2021-2023
Billy V. Huerta	2007-2021
Jesse Rodriguez Sr.	1981-2007
Stanley Webb III	1977-1981
Johnny G. Niño	1973-1977
David J. Kern	1971-1973
William “W.H” Evans	1967-1971
H.E Odessa	1964-1967

== Geography ==
Odem is located at 27°56′52″N 97°35′3″W (27.947773, –97.584169).

According to the United States Census Bureau, the city has a total area of 1.1 sq mi (2.9 km^{2}), all land.

== Demographics ==
Historical population
Census	Pop.	Note	%±
1930	842		—
1940	1,147		36.2%
1950	1,680		46.5%
1960	2,088		24.3%
1970	2,130		2.0%
1980	2,363		10.9%
1990	2,366		0.1%
2000	2,499		5.6%
2010	2,389		−4.4%
2020	2,255		−5.6%
U.S. Decennial Census

=== 2020 census ===
As of the 2020 census, there were 2,255 people, 801 households, and 542 families residing in the city. The median age was 39.1 years. 24.9% of residents were under the age of 18 and 18.0% of residents were 65 years of age or older. For every 100 females there were 91.6 males, and for every 100 females age 18 and over there were 90.0 males age 18 and over.

0.0% of residents lived in urban areas, while 100.0% lived in rural areas.

There were 801 households in Odem, of which 37.8% had children under the age of 18 living in them. Of all households, 46.1% were married-couple households, 17.2% were households with a male householder and no spouse or partner present, and 30.1% were households with a female householder and no spouse or partner present. About 22.6% of all households were made up of individuals and 10.6% had someone living alone who was 65 years of age or older.

There were 901 housing units, of which 11.1% were vacant. The homeowner vacancy rate was 1.7% and the rental vacancy rate was 8.0%.

Racial composition as of the 2020 census
Race	Number	Percent
White	1,310	58.1%
Black or African American	15	0.7%
American Indian and Alaska Native	20	0.9%
Asian	4	0.2%
Native Hawaiian and Other Pacific Islander	0	0.0%
Some other race	296	13.1%
Two or more races	610	27.1%
Hispanic or Latino (of any race)	1,833	81.3%

=== 2000 census ===
As of the census of 2000, 2,499 people, 776 households, and 633 families were residing in the city. The population density was 2,246.0 people/sq mi (869.3/km^{2}). The 843 housing units averaged 757.7/sq mi (293.2/km^{2}). The racial makeup of the city was 73.59% White, 0.20% African American, 0.68% Native American, 23.11% from other races, and 2.44% from two or more races. Hispanics or Latinos of any race were 77.91% of the population.

Of the 776 households, 43.9% had children under 18 living with them, 58.9% were married couples living together, 17.5% had a female householder with no husband present, and 18.3% were not families. About 17.4% of all households were made up of individuals, and 9.1% had someone living alone who was 65 or older. The average household size was 3.22, and the average family size was 3.65.

In the city, the age distribution was 32.5% under 18, 9.9% from 18 to 24, 26.8% from 25 to 44, 20.3% from 45 to 64, and 10.5% who were 65 or older. The median age was 31 years. For every 100 females, there were 87.2 males. For every 100 females age 18 and over, there were 82.5 males.

The median income for a household in the city was $31,090, and for a family was $33,947. Males had a median income of $26,875 versus $19,063 for females. The per capita income for the city was $11,246. About 18.2% of families and 19.4% of the population were below the poverty line, including 21.5% of those under age 18 and 22.9% of those age 65 or over.

== Education ==
The City of Odem is served by the Odem-Edroy Independent School District.

Del Mar College is the designated community college for all of San Patricio County.
