= List of Farm to Market Roads in Texas (600–699) =

- Texas Farm to Market Road and Ranch to Market Road markers

Highway names
- Interstates: Interstate Highway X (IH-X, I-X)
- US Highways: U.S. Highway X (US X)
- State: State Highway X (SH X)
- Loops: Loop X
- Spurs: Spur X
- Recreational: Recreational Road X (RE X)
- Farm or Ranch to Market Roads: Farm to Market Road X (FM X); Ranch to Market Road X (RM X)
- Park Roads: Park Road X (PR X)

System links
- Highways in Texas; Interstate; US; State; Former; Toll; Loops; Spurs; FM/RM; Park; Rec

Farm to Market Roads in Texas are owned and maintained by the Texas Department of Transportation (TxDOT).

== FM 600 ==
Farm to Market Road 600
- Location: Haskell, Jones, and Taylor counties
- Length: 54.543 mi (Note: The certified length given is shorter than the actual mileage, as the TxDOT description of FM 600 considers it to be discontinuous at rather than concurrent with SH 6 and FM 618.) (87.778 km)
- Existed: July 25, 1945–present

Farm to Market Road 600 (FM 600) is located in Haskell, Jones, and Taylor counties.

FM 600 begins at I-20 in Abilene and runs in a northern direction along West Lake Road before turning northeast at FM 3308 and turning back north at FM 3034. In northern Abilene, the highway runs near the western shore of Fort Phantom Hill Lake, leaving the city limits north of the FM 1082 intersection. FM 600 runs through rural areas of Jones County, intersecting US 180 east of Anson and has a short overlap with SH 6 through the town of Avoca. After the overlap with SH 6, the highway runs in an eastern direction before turning back north at County Road 223. FM 600 crosses over Lake Stamford before sharing an overlap with FM 618 near Paint Creek. The highway runs through rural areas of Haskell County before ending at an intersection with US 380 on the eastern edge of Haskell.

FM 600 was designated on July 25, 1945, running from US 380 (now SH 6) to a point 8 miles (13 km) to the northeast. On December 16, 1948, the highway was extended further north to FM 142. On September 27, 1960, FM 600 was extended north to FM 618. On October 22, 1962, FM 600 was rerouted over a section of FM 142 south and west to US 380 (now SH 6), while the old route east and south to Lueders was transferred to FM 142. FM 600 absorbed FM 1834 north of FM 618 and FM 1193 south of US 380, extending the highway to I-20. On June 27, 1995, the section of FM 600 between I-20 and FM 3034 was redesignated Urban Road 600 (UR 600). The designation reverted to FM 600 with the elimination of the Urban Road system on November 15, 2018.

Junction list

County	Location	mi	km	Destinations	Notes
Taylor	Abilene	0.0	0.0	I-20 – Sweetwater, Cisco	I-20 exit 286C
Taylor	Abilene	1.3	2.1	FM 3308 east (Neas Road)	
Jones	Abilene	2.6	4.2	FM 3034 west (Beltway North)	
Jones	Abilene	8.5	13.7	FM 1082 west – Hawley	South end of FM 1082 overlap
Jones	Abilene	9.2	14.8	FM 1082 east	North end of FM 1082 overlap
Jones		20.9	33.6	US 180 – Anson, Albany	
Jones		23.9	38.5	FM 1597 east – Lueders	
Jones	Avoca	28.3	45.5	SH 6 south – Lueders	South end of SH 6 overlap
Jones	Avoca	28.7	46.2	SH 6 north / FM 1636 west – Stamford	North end of SH 6 overlap
Jones		36.5	58.7	FM 142 – Stamford, Lueders	
Haskell		43.4	69.8	FM 2976 north – Lake Stamford	
Haskell		46.5	74.8	FM 618 west	South end of FM 618 overlap
Haskell		48.4	77.9	FM 618 north	North end of FM 618 overlap
Haskell	Haskell	57.3	92.2	US 380 – Haskell, Throckmorton	
1.000 mi = 1.609 km; 1.000 km = 0.621 mi: Concurrency terminus

== FM 601 ==
Farm to Market Road 601
- Location: Shackelford County
- Length: 12.673 mi (20.395 km)
- Existed: July 25, 1945–present

Farm to Market Road 601 (FM 601) is located in Shackelford County. Its western terminus is at SH 6 southeast of Albany. Its eastern terminus is at FM 576 near the Stephens County line.

FM 601 was designated on July 25, 1945, from its current western terminus (at the time US 283) at Albany eastward to Ibex. It was extended by 0.6 miles (0.97 km) to FM 1232 on May 23, 1951, and by another 2 miles (3.2 km) to the new location of FM 1232 (replaced by FM 576 on January 14, 1952) on December 18 of that year. The western terminus was redescribed as SH 6 on August 4, 1971.

== FM 602 ==
Farm to Market Road 602
- Location: Floyd County
- Length: 13.103 mi (Note: The certified length given is shorter than the actual mileage, as the TxDOT description of FM 602 considers it to be discontinuous at rather than concurrent with US 62 / US 70.) (21.087 km)
- Existed: May 23, 1951–present

Farm to Market Road 602 (FM 602) is located in Floyd County. It runs from FM 1958 to FM 786 at Rushing Chapel. It has a concurrency with US 62/US 70.

FM 602 was designated on May 23, 1951, from FM 786 at Rushing Chapel south to US 70. On October 26, 1983, the section from US 70 to FM 1958 was added, creating a concurrency with US 70.

Junction list

The entire route is in Floyd County.

Location	mi	km	Destinations	Notes
	0.0	0.0	FM 1958	
	7.9	12.7	US 62 east / US 70 east – Matador	South end of US 62 / US 70 overlap
	8.9	14.3	US 62 west / US 70 west – Floydada	North end of US 62 / US 70 overlap
	14.1	22.7	FM 786	
1.000 mi = 1.609 km; 1.000 km = 0.621 mi: Concurrency terminus

=== FM 602 (1945) ===
Farm to Market Road 602
- Location: Callahan County
- Existed: August 3, 1945–September 26, 1945

A previous route numbered FM 602 was designated in Callahan County on August 3, 1945, from Cross Plains south to the Brown County line. On August 23, 1945, SH 279 was extended north over FM 602. The FM 602 designation would subsequently be cancelled on September 26, 1945.

== FM 603 ==
Farm to Market Road 603
- Location: Callahan County
- Length: 11.231 mi (18.075 km)
- Existed: June 6, 1945–present

Farm to Market Road 603 (FM 603) is located in Callahan County. It begins at SH 36 west of the community of Denton. It proceeds north, passing through the community of Eula and crossing FM 18 before reaching its northern terminus at exit 297 of I-20 west of Clyde.

FM 603 was designated on June 6, 1945, from Eula to what was then US 80, a distance of 4.8 miles (7.7 km). On September 19, 1951, US 80 was relocated a mile to the north, and the old route was replaced by FM 18. On October 31, 1958, FM 603 was extended south to SH 36, increasing its length to 10.6 miles (17.1 km). On September 20, 1961, it was extended an additional half mile to the north, to the new routing of US 80, which later became I-20.

== FM 604 ==
Farm to Market Road 604
- Location: Taylor, Callahan, and Shackelford counties
- Length: 51.086 mi (82.215 km)
- Existed: August 3, 1945–present

Farm to Market Road 604 (FM 604) is located in Taylor, Callahan, and Shackelford counties. The highway runs from US 83 southwest of Ovalo eastward and northward to SH 351 northeast of Abilene.

FM 604 was designated on August 3, 1945, to run from SH 36 south to Oplin. On July 11, 1951, the road was extended north to US 80 (now I-20) at Clyde, replacing FM 1078, and west from Oplin to US 84, replacing a section of FM 688 (the connecting section was designated on May 23, 1951). On February 20, 1952, the road was extended west to US 83 at Guion, replacing another section of FM 688 and all of FM 1748 (the remainder of FM 688 would be transferred to FM 382 on November 27, 1957). On October 28, 1953, the road was extended northwest 4.0 miles (6.4 km) from US 80 (now I-20), creating a concurrency with US 80 (now I-20). On May 19, 1966, the road was extended northwest to SH 351, replacing FM 2927. On May 26, 2005, FM 604 was relocated on a more direct route south of Clyde, eliminating the concurrency with I-20; the old route (as well as Spur 189) was given to the city and county.

Junction list

County	Location	mi	km	Destinations	Notes
Taylor		0.0	0.0	US 83 – Tuscola, Bradshaw	
Taylor		5.6	9.0	FM 382 south – Crews	South end of FM 382 overlap
Taylor		6.0	9.7	FM 382 north – Ovalo	North end of FM 382 overlap
Taylor	Lawn	7.7	12.4	US 84 – Abilene, Coleman	
Callahan	Oplin	19.4	31.2	FM 2926 east	
Callahan		21.5	34.6	FM 1178 north – Dudley	
Callahan	Denton	27.8	44.7	SH 36 – Abilene, Cross Plains	
Callahan		35.2	56.6	FM 3217 east	
Callahan		38.4	61.8	FM 2700 east – Baird	
Callahan	Clyde	39.6	63.7	FM 18	Interchange
Callahan	Clyde	40.1	64.5	North 1st Street	Interchange
Callahan	Clyde	40.4	65.0	I-20 – Abilene, Baird	I-20 exit 300
Shackelford		51.1	82.2	SH 351 – Abilene, Albany	
1.000 mi = 1.609 km; 1.000 km = 0.621 mi: Concurrency terminus

== FM 605 ==
Farm to Market Road 605
- Location: Jones County
- Length: 14.132 mi (22.743 km)
- Existed: June 6, 1945–present

Farm to Market Road 605 (FM 605) is located in Jones County. Its western terminus is at FM 126 near Merkel, just north of the Taylor County line. Its eastern terminus is at US 83 in Hawley.

FM 605 was designated on June 6, 1945, to run from US 83 westward 6.0 miles (9.7 km) via Hodges. On December 16, 1948, the road was extended southward and westward to FM 126.

Junction list

The entire route is in Jones County.

Location	mi	km	Destinations	Notes
	0.0	0.0	FM 126 – Hamlin, Merkel	
	3.9	6.3	FM 1235 south	
	6.5	10.5	FM 707 south – Tye	West end of FM 707 overlap
	8.1	13.0	FM 707 north	East end of FM 707 overlap
	10.9	17.5	FM 2404 south	
Hawley	14.1	22.7	US 83 / US 277 – Anson, Abilene	
1.000 mi = 1.609 km; 1.000 km = 0.621 mi: Concurrency terminus

== FM 606 ==
Farm to Market Road 606
- Location: Willacy County
- Length: 0.795 mi (1,279 m)
- Existed: October 26, 1954–present

Farm to Market Road 606 (FM 606) is located in Willacy County in the Rio Grande Valley. The highway is located in the community of Port Mansfield and passes mainly through residential areas.

FM 606 begins at SH 186 as a two-lane road. This southern terminus is located less than 200 yards (180 m) from the Gulf of Mexico. The road proceeds north-northwest, passing numerous small houses and empty housing lots and intersecting several small local roads. The highway bends slightly, proceeding in a northward direction and passing several more houses before intersecting County Road 4150. The route continues northward, passing several more small houses and lots before passing a small park and the Fred Stone County Fishing Pier. The highway proceeds a short distance northward before reaching its northern terminus at a dead end point.

FM 606 was designated on October 26, 1954, on the current route, from FM 497 (now SH 186) to a dead end point.

=== FM 606 (1945) ===
Farm to Market Road 606
- Location: Jones County
- Existed: July 26, 1945–October 22, 1954

A previous route numbered FM 606 was designated in Jones County on July 26, 1945, from US 180 at Boyds Chapel 4 miles (6.4 km) north to Hamlin Lake. On December 16, 1948, the route was extended north 4.1 miles (6.6 km) to US 83. FM 606 was cancelled on October 22, 1954, and combined with FM 126.

== FM 607 ==
Farm to Market Road 607
- Location: Henderson County
- Length: 14.160 mi (22.788 km)
- Existed: November 20, 1951–present

Farm to Market Road 607 (FM 607) is located in Henderson County. It runs from SH 31 at Brownsboro to Loop 60 at La Rue.

FM 607 was designated on November 20, 1951, on the current route. This was a renumbering a portion of FM 314, which was rerouted on a new road to the east. This portion of FM 314 was numbered as FM 313 until December 3, 1948, but FM 313 was already assigned elsewhere on May 23, 1951.

=== FM 607 (1945) ===
Farm to Market Road 607
- Location: Nolan County
- Existed: July 28, 1945–November 20, 1951

A previous route numbered FM 607 was designated on July 28, 1945, from FM 53 (now SH 153) east via Nolan to Dora. On August 26, 1948, the road was extended to the Taylor County line. FM 607 was cancelled on November 20, 1951, and combined with FM 126.

== FM 608 ==
Farm to Market Road 608
- Location: Nolan and Fisher counties
- Length: 39.425 mi (63.448 km)
- Existed: July 26, 1945–present

Farm to Market Road 608 (FM 608) is located in Nolan and Fisher counties.

FM 608 was designated on July 26, 1945, from US 80 (now Business I-20) in Roscoe south 8.0 miles (12.9 km) to Highland School. On February 27, 1948, FM 608 was extended to Maryneal. On September 29, 1954, FM 608 was extended northeast to SH 70. On October 31, 1957, FM 608 was extended to the Nolan–Fisher county line. On September 27, 1960, FM 608 was extended north to FM 611, yielding its current route.

== FM 609 ==
Farm to Market Road 609
- Location: Fayette County
- Length: 20.095 mi (32.340 km)
- Existed: May 23, 1951–present

Farm to Market Road 609 (FM 609) is located in Fayette County. It runs from US 90 in Flatonia northeast to Bus. SH 71 west of La Grange.

FM 609 was designated on May 23, 1951, from US 90 in Flatonia northeast 3.8 miles (6.1 km) to a road intersection. On November 20, 1951, the road was extended 8.7 miles (14.0 km) northeast. On January 16, 1953, the road was extended northeast to SH 71 (now Bus. SH 71), replacing FM 1294. On September 5, 1973, the section from SH 71 northwest 2.5 miles (4.0 km) was added, creating a concurrency with SH 71. This concurrent section was cancelled on May 2, 1977.

=== FM 609 (1945) ===
Farm to Market Road 609
- Location: Fisher County
- Existed: July 23, 1945–December 16, 1948

A previous route numbered FM 609 was designated in Fisher County on July 23, 1945, from Longworth west to SH 70. FM 609 was cancelled on December 16, 1948, and combined with FM 57.

== FM 610 ==
Farm to Market Road 610
- Location: Fisher and Stonewall counties
- Length: 20.611 mi (33.170 km)
- Existed: July 23, 1945–present

Farm to Market Road 610 (FM 610) is located in Fisher and Stonewall counties.

FM 610 was designated on July 23, 1945, from SH 70 to the Stonewall–Fisher county line. Seven days later, FM 610 was extended to Aspermont.

== FM 611 ==
Farm to Market Road 611
- Location: Fisher County
- Length: 26.098 mi (42.001 km)
- Existed: July 23, 1945–present

Farm to Market Road 611 (FM 611) is located in Fisher County.

FM 611 was designated on July 23, 1945, from US 180 northward 4.0 miles (6.4 km) to Hobbs. On May 23, 1951, FM 611 was extended north to FM 646. On July 11, 1951, FM 611 was extended east to SH 70, replacing FM 646. On October 31, 1957, FM 611 was extended south 5.0 miles (8.0 km). On October 31, 1958, FM 611 was extended to its end at FM 419.

== FM 612 ==
Farm to Market Road 612
- Location: Borden and Scurry counties
- Length: 21.906 mi (35.254 km)
- Existed: July 31, 1945–present

Farm to Market Road 612 (FM 612) is located in Borden and Scurry counties. It runs from US 180 east of Gail north and east to US 84.

FM 612 was designated on July 31, 1945, to run from US 84 to Fluvanna. On December 17, 1952, the road was extended west to the Scurry/Borden County line. On January 27, 1953, the road was extended west and south to US 84, replacing FM 1958.

== FM 613 ==
Farm to Market Road 613
- Location: Taylor County
- Length: 10.118 mi (16.283 km)
- Existed: July 30, 1945–present

Farm to Market Road 613 (FM 613) is located in Taylor County. It runs from FM 89 in Buffalo Gap south and east via Tuscola to US 84.

FM 613 was designated on July 30, 1945, to run from FM 89 in Buffalo Gap to US 83 in Tuscola. On November 10, 1947, the road was extended north to US 277 (now 14th Street) in Abilene, replacing a section of FM 89. On October 9, 1951, the road was extended east to US 84, replacing FM 1749. On February 27, 1958, the section from 14th Street to US 83 was given to the city of Abilene due to the rerouting of US 83. On June 17, 1965, the section from FM 89 to US 83 was transferred back to FM 89.

== FM 614 ==
Farm to Market Road 614
- Location: Taylor County
- Length: 6.534 mi (10.515 km)
- Existed: July 30, 1945–present

Farm to Market Road 614 (FM 614) is located in Taylor County. It runs from US 83 in Ovalo east 6.5 miles (10.5 km).

FM 614 was designated on July 30, 1945, on the current route.

== FM 615 ==
Farm to Market Road 615
- Location: Fayette County
- Length: 2.623 mi (4.221 km)
- Existed: May 23, 1951–present

Farm to Market Road 615 (FM 615) is located in Fayette County.

FM 615 was designated on May 23, 1951, from US 77, 2.5 miles (4.0 km) north of Schulenburg, eastward 2.8 miles (4.5 km).

=== FM 615 (1945) ===
Farm to Market Road 615
- Location: Taylor County
- Existed: July 30, 1945–December 16, 1948

A previous route numbered FM 615 was designated on July 30, 1945, from Merkel southwest to Blair. The road was planned be extended southwest to Nubia, but FM 615 was cancelled on December 16, 1948, and combined with FM 126.

== FM 616 ==
Farm to Market Road 616
- Location: Victoria, Jackson, and Matagorda counties
- Length: 46.188 mi (74.332 km)
- Existed: July 25, 1945–present

Farm to Market Road 616 (FM 616) is located in Victoria, Jackson, and Matagorda counties. It runs from SH 185 at Bloomington to SH 35 at Blessing.

FM 616 was designated on July 25, 1945, from SH 172 at La Ward east 5 miles (8.0 km). On August 4, 1945, FM 616 was changed to that it instead went from SH 172 west 5.0 miles (8.0 km) to Lolita. On February 25, 1949, the road was extended north 3.2 miles (5.1 km) to a road intersection. On July 14 of that year, a 6.0-mile (9.7 km) section from the end of FM 616 to SH 111 was added. On March 27, 1951, the section from SH 111 to Lolita was renumbered FM 1593, while the section from FM 234 at Vanderbilt to Lolita was added. On October 18, 1954, the road was extended west to La Salle, replacing a section of FM 234. On November 27, 1954, the road was extended east to SH 35 at Blessing, replacing FM 1727 (the section from SH 35 to Blessing is former Spur 93 and previously SH 177). On October 31, 1958, the road was extended southwest to the Victoria County line. On November 25, 1958, the road was extended southwest to FM 404 (now SH 185) at Bloomington, replacing FM 1302.

== FM 617 ==
Farm to Market Road 617
- Location: Haskell County
- Length: 28.713 mi (46.209 km)
- Existed: July 27, 1945–present

Farm to Market Road 617 (FM 617) is located in Haskell County. It runs from US 380 in Rule north, west, north, and east to BU 277-E in Weinert.

FM 617 was designated on July 27, 1945, to run from SH 283 (now SH 6) in Rochester to US 277 (later Loop 203, now BU 277-E) in Weinert. On August 5, 1955, the road was extended west, south, east, and south to SH 24 (now US 380) in Rule, replacing FM 1081.

== FM 618 ==
Farm to Market Road 618
- Location: Haskell County
- Length: 16.544 mi (26.625 km)
- Existed: July 27, 1945–present

Farm to Market Road 618 (FM 618) is located in Haskell County. It runs from US 280 east of Haskell south and east to US 277.

FM 618 was designated on July 27, 1945, to run from SH 24 (now US 380) in Haskell, south and west 8.4 miles (13.5 km). On November 20, 1951, the road was rerouted to go south and west to US 277; the old route was renumbered as FM 1834 (which became part of FM 600 on October 22, 1962).

== FM 619 ==
Farm to Market Road 619
- Location: Williamson and Lee counties
- Length: 23.011 mi (37.033 km)
- Existed: June 11, 1945–present

Farm to Market Road 619 (FM 619) is located in Lee and Williamson counties.

FM 619 begins in Lee County at FM 696, just north of the Bastrop County line. It travels northward and soon enters Williamson County. The route is primarily rural and does not go through any major cities or communities, other than passing just east of Taylor, where it has a brief concurrency with FM 112 and crosses US 79. The route's northern terminus is at FM 1331, south of Granger Lake.

The highway has one spur route, FM Spur 619, which runs from just north of the Williamson–Lee county line eastward and southward to the county line. It is a former alignment of the main route through the community of Beaukiss.

FM 619 was designated in Williamson County on June 11, 1945, beginning at FM 112 and ending in the community of Structure. The southern extension to the Lee County line, along what is the present-day route and its spur route south of the junction, occurred on December 17, 1952. On September 29, 1954, a southward extension into Lee County was designated, and the two routes were joined via a new alignment, creating the spur route. The northward extension to FM 1331 took effect on June 28, 1963.

== RM 620 ==
Ranch to Market Road 620
- Location: Travis and Williamson counties
- Length: 23.239 mi (37.400 km)
- Existed: July 9, 1945 (Note: RM 620 was previously designated as FM 620 from 1945 to 1956.)–present

Ranch to Market Road 620 (RM 620) is located in Travis and Williamson counties. It runs from SH 71 in Bee Cave to I-35 in Round Rock.

== FM 621 ==
Farm to Market Road 621
- Location: Hays and Guadalupe counties
- Length: 12.848 mi (20.677 km)
- Existed: July 21, 1945–present

Farm to Market Road 621 (FM 621) is located in Hays and Guadalupe counties.

On June 11, 1945, FM 621 was designated to run from SH 123 at Geronimo east toward Weinert School. On August 4, 1945, the road was extended east through Weinert School to Staples, cancelling an unnumbered farm to market road from SH 123 northeast 10.0 miles (16.1 km) through Staples. The road was 15.4 miles (24.8 km) at the time. On November 28, 1945, the road was changed to run from SH 123 north of Seguin northeast toward Staples, shortening the road to 14.3 miles (23.0 km). On September 12, 1946, the road was extended to 3.5 miles (5.6 km) to Staples. On May 23, 1951, the road was extended northwest to the Guadalupe-Hays county line. On June 27, 1951, the road was extended northwest to SH 123 south of San Marcos, replacing FM 1324. On April 24, 1958, the section from FM 20 (changed from FM 964 6 days before that) southwest to SH 123 became part of FM 20.

== FM 622 ==
Farm to Market Road 622
- Location: Goliad and Victoria counties
- Length: 17.886 mi (28.785 km)
- Existed: July 19, 1945–present

Farm to Market Road 622 (FM 622) is located in Goliad and Victoria counties. It runs from US 183 north of Goliad northeast to FM 236 northwest of Victoria.

FM 622 was designated on July 19, 1945, to run from SH 29 (now US 183) northeast to Schroeder. On November 23, 1948, the road was extended northeast to Upper Mission Valley Road (later FM 1515, now FM 236) northwest of Victoria. On April 4, 1949, the length was changed from 21.5 miles (34.6 km) to 18.0 miles (29.0 km).

== FM 623 ==
Farm to Market Road 623
- Location: Live Oak and Bee counties
- Length: 21.965 mi (35.349 km)
- Existed: June 23, 1945–present

Farm to Market Road 623 (FM 623) is located in Live Oak and Bee counties.

FM 623 was designated on June 23, 1945, to run from US 181 in Pettus west to Mineral. On February 27, 1948, the road was extended north to the Bee-Karnes County Line. On December 17, 1952, the road was extended west to FM 1358 near Karon, completing its current route.

== FM 624 ==
Farm to Market Road 624
- Location: La Salle, McMullen, Live Oak, Jim Wells, and Nueces
- Length: 113.802 mi (183.147 km)
- Existed: July 9, 1945–present

Farm to Market Road 624 (FM 624) is located in La Salle, McMullen, Live Oak, Jim Wells, and Nueces counties. At 113.8 miles (183.1 km), FM 624 is one of the longest farm-to-market roads in the state of Texas.

FM 624 was designated on July 9, 1945, to run from the Jim Wells/Nueces County Line west via Orange Grove to 6.5 miles (10.5 km) west of Orange Grove. On September 10, 1945, the road extended east to US 77 in Calallen. On January 18, 1946, the road was extended west to US 281. On January 22, 1957, the road extended northwest to US 59 at or near the Live Oak/McMullen County Line. On August 28, 1958, the road was extended northwest to the McMullen/La Salle County Line. On April 30, 1959, the road was extended west to I-35 at or near Artesia Wells. On December 19, 1975, the section from FM 468 to I-35 was cancelled (that section was never built), and the road was rerouted over a section of FM 468 to SH 97 near Cotulla.

Junction list

County	Location	mi	km	Destinations	Notes
La Salle	Cotulla	0.0	0.0	SH 97 – Cotulla, Los Angeles, Jourdanton	
La Salle		13.3	21.4	FM 469 north – Los Angeles	
McMullen		49.3	79.3	SH 16 – Tilden, Freer	
Live Oak		66.1	106.4	US 59 – George West, Freer	Future I-69W; current at-grade intersection
Live Oak		70.9	114.1	FM 1359 north	
Live Oak		76.6	123.3	FM 3469 west	
Jim Wells		82.1	132.1	Future I-69C / US 281 – George West, Alice	Interchange
Jim Wells	Orange Grove	93.2	150.0	FM 738	
Jim Wells	Orange Grove	93.4	150.3	SH 359 – Mathis, Alice	
Nueces		97.6	157.1	FM 70 – Sandia, Agua Dulce	
Nueces	Bluntzer	103.8	167.0	FM 666 – Mathis, Banquete	
Nueces	Corpus Christi	112.0	180.2	FM 1889 south / Trinity River Drive	
Nueces	Corpus Christi	113.8	183.1	I-69E / US 77 to I-37 – Victoria, Kingsville	
1.000 mi = 1.609 km; 1.000 km = 0.621 mi

== FM 625 ==
Farm to Market Road 625
- Location: Jim Wells County
- Length: 11.670 mi (18.781 km)
- Existed: July 9, 1945–present

Farm to Market Road 625 (FM 625) is located in Jim Wells County.

FM 625 was designated on July 9, 1945, to run from US 281 south of Alice west 3.0 miles (4.8 km). On July 14, 1949, the road was extended west and north to US 59 (now SH 359), completing its current route.

== FM 626 ==
Farm to Market Road 626
- Location: Karnes County
- Length: 11.444 mi (18.417 km)
- Existed: July 9, 1945–present

Farm to Market Road 626 (FM 626) is located in Karnes County.

FM 626 was designated on July 9, 1945, to run from FM 99 south to Lenz. On May 23, 1951, the road was extended south 2.7 miles (4.3 km) to a road intersection. On October 31, 1957, the road was extended south to SH 72, completing its current route.

== FM 627 ==
Farm to Market Road 627
- Location: Karnes and DeWitt counties
- Length: 17.009 mi (27.373 km)
- Existed: July 9, 1945–present

Farm to Market Road 627 (FM 627) is located in Karnes and DeWitt counties.

FM 627 was designated on July 9, 1945, to run from SH 80 east to Ecleto. On November 23, 1948, the road was extended west 2.5 miles (4.0 km) to Harmony School. On November 24, 1959, the road was extended west 1.8 miles (2.9 km) to a road intersection at what later became FM 2724. On December 17, 1969, the road was extended east and south to FM 81 north of Runge, replacing FM 742 (connecting section designated November 26) and completing its current route.

== RM 628 ==
Ranch to Market Road 628
- Location: Kleberg County
- Length: 11.666 mi (18.775 km)
- Existed: July 9, 1945 (Note: RM 628 was previously designated as FM 628 from 1945 to 1984.)–present

Ranch to Market Road 628 (RM 628) is located in Kleberg County.

RM 628 was designated on July 9, 1945, as Farm to Market Road 628 (FM 628), running from US 77 north of Rivera, east 10.0 miles (16.1 km) through Vattman to North Beach (now Loyola Beach). On December 16, 1948, the road was extended southeast 0.7 miles (1.1 km) from North Beach. On July 14, 1949, the road was extended south to FM 771, but that extension was renumbered FM 1546 on October 7 of that year. On September 21, 1955, the road was extended south and west to FM 1546, completing its current route. The designation was changed to RM 628 in 1984 or later.

== FM 629 ==
Farm to Market Road 629
- Location: Refugio County
- Length: 3.500 mi (5.633 km)
- Existed: July 5, 1945–present

Farm to Market Road 629 (FM 629) is located in Refugio County.

FM 629 was designated on July 5, 1945, to run from FM 136 south to Bonnie View. On October 29, 1953, the road was extended south to FM 1360, completing its current route.

== FM 630 ==
Farm to Market Road 630
- Location: San Patricio County
- Length: 10.463 mi (16.839 km)
- Existed: July 9, 1945–present

Farm to Market Road 630 (FM 630) is located in San Patricio County.

FM 630 was designated on July 9, 1945, to run from Sinton west via Adams School to SH 9 (now I-37). On March 24, 1958, the section from then-FM 894 to Sinton became part of FM 881 (now SH 188), shortening the road to its current route. FM 894 also became part of FM 881 (now SH 188).

== FM 631 ==
Farm to Market Road 631
- Location: San Patricio County
- Length: 20.038 mi (32.248 km)
- Existed: July 9, 1945–present

Farm to Market Road 631 (FM 631) is located in San Patricio County.

FM 631 was designated on July 9, 1945, to run from US 77 at Odem northeast via Sodville to Taft. The description was changed to go through Sodville School and not specify a direction on April 8, 1946. On March 24, 1958, the road was extended north to Plymouth Oil Field, replacing FM 1068 and completing its current route.

== FM 632 ==
Farm to Market Road 632
- Location: Karnes County
- Length: 0.872 mi (1,403 m)
- Existed: October 29, 1993–present

Farm to Market Road 632 (FM 632) is located in Karnes County. It runs from US 181 south of Kenedy east 0.9 miles (1.4 km) to the TDCJ's Connally Unit.

FM 632 was designated on October 29, 1992, along the current route.

=== FM 632 (1945–1969) ===
Farm to Market Road 632
- Location: San Patricio County
- Existed: July 9, 1945–January 13, 1969

The first use of the FM 632 designation was in San Patricio County. FM 632 was designated on July 9, 1945, from Gregory southeast to Ingleside. On June 1, 1948, the road was extended to Aransas Pass. FM 632 was cancelled on January 13, 1969, and transferred to SH 361.

=== FM/RM 632 (1973–1976) ===
Ranch to Market Road 632
- Location: Mason County
- Existed: September 5, 1973 (Note: RM 632 was previously designated as FM 632 from 1973 to 1974.)–March 5, 1976

The second use of the FM 632 designation was in Mason County, from US 87, 0.5 miles (0.80 km) south of US 377 north of Mason, east and south to SH 29. On May 7, 1974, the road was extended west and south to RM 1871, a break in the route was added at RM 386, and FM 632 was changed to RM 632. RM 632 was cancelled on March 5, 1976, and removed from the highway system in exchange for extending FM 2618.

=== FM 632 (1979–1989) ===
Farm to Market Road 632
- Location: Live Oak County
- Existed: September 26, 1979–March 28, 1989

The third use of the FM 632 designation was in Live Oak County, from US 59/US 281 northeast to US 59 in George West. FM 632 was cancelled on March 28, 1989, and transferred to US 59.

== FM 633 ==
Farm to Market Road 633
- Location: Navarro County
- Length: 4.770 mi (7.677 km)
- Existed: July 2, 1945–present

Farm to Market Road 633 (FM 633) is located in Navarro County. It runs from SH 31 in Powell to FM 1393.

FM 633 was designated on July 2, 1945, to run from SH 31 in Powell southeast to Elm Flat. On September 27, 1960, the road was extended east to FM 1393, completing its current route.

== FM 634 ==
Farm to Market Road 634
- Location: Limestone County
- Length: 0.367 mi (591 m)
- Existed: October 31, 1958–present

Farm to Market Road 634 (FM 634) is located in Limestone County. It runs from SH 171 northwest of Mexia southwest to Mexia State School.

FM 634 was designated on October 31, 1958, on the current route.

=== FM 634 (1945) ===
Farm to Market Road 634
- Location: Navarro County
- Existed: July 2, 1945–July 27, 1948

A previous route numbered FM 634 was designated on July 2, 1945, from Silver City to Blooming Grove. On September 26, 1945, the road was extended to SH 22, replacing the former Spur 31. FM 634 was cancelled on July 27, 1948, and reassigned to FM 55.

== FM 635 ==
Farm to Market Road 635
- Location: Navarro County
- Length: 2.142 mi (3.447 km)
- Existed: July 2, 1945–present

Farm to Market Road 635 (FM 635) is located in Navarro County. It runs from SH 309 near Round Prairie east to Rural Shade.

FM 635 was designated on July 2, 1945, on the current route.

== FM 636 ==
Farm to Market Road 636
- Location: Navarro County
- Length: 12.625 mi (20.318 km)
- Existed: July 2, 1945–present

Farm to Market Road 636 (FM 636) is located in Navarro County. It runs from SH 31 in Kerens northwest and southwest to FM 1129.

FM 636 was designated on July 2, 1945, to run from SH 31 in Kerens northwest 4.1 miles (6.6 km) to near Bazette. On May 26, 1949, a section from FM 1129 to Montfort was added, creating a gap. On July 25, 1951, the southern section extended northwest 3.3 miles (5.3 km) to a road intersection. On November 20, 1951, the gap was closed, completing its current route.

== FM 637 ==
Farm to Market Road 637
- Location: Navarro County
- Length: 8.264 mi (13.300 km)
- Existed: July 2, 1945–present

Farm to Market Road 637 (FM 637) is located in Navarro County. It runs from US 287 near Mildred to US 287.

FM 637 was designated on July 2, 1945, to run from US 287 near Mildred east 5.0 miles (8.0 km) to 2.0 miles (3.2 km) east of Tuckertown. On July 15, 1949, the road extended southeast to US 287, completing its current route.

== FM 638 ==
Farm to Market Road 638
- Location: Navarro and Limestone counties
- Length: 13.566 mi (21.832 km)
- Existed: July 2, 1945–present

Farm to Market Road 638 (FM 638) is located in Navarro and Limestone counties. It runs from FM 709 to SH 171 in Tehuacana.

FM 638 was designated on July 2, 1945, to run from SH 31 (later FM 709) southeast through Eldorado to the Navarro/Limestone County Line. On July 14, 1949, the road was extended southeast to SH 171 in Tehuacana.

== FM 639 ==
Farm to Market Road 639
- Location: Navarro County
- Length: 10.459 mi (16.832 km)
- Existed: July 2, 1945–present

Farm to Market Road 639 (FM 639) is located in Navarro County. It runs from SH 22, 1.7 miles (2.7 km) west of Frost, to FM 55. There is a concurrency with FM 744.

FM 639 was designated on July 2, 1945, from SH 22, 1.7 miles (2.7 km) west of Frost to Emmett. On July 15, 1949, the road was extended to FM 1127 at Rush Prairie. On October 26, 1949, the road was extended to SH 31 at Dawson, replacing FM 1127. On October 29, 1962, the road was shortened to end at FM 744 at Emmett; the section from Emmett east 2.4 miles (3.9 km) to FM 918 (as well as FM 918 itself) was transferred to FM 744, the section from FM 918 south 2.1 miles (3.4 km) was renumbered FM 1578, the section from 2.1 miles (3.4 km) south of FM 918 south 2.3 miles (3.7 km) was removed from the highway system (as it was inundated) and the section from 4.4 miles (7.1 km) south of FM 918 south to SH 31 was transferred to FM 709. On August 31, 1971, the road was extended south and east to FM 55, creating a concurrency with FM 744 and replacing FM 3164. Note that one section from FM 744 to the former end of FM 3164 has not been built yet.

== FM 640 ==
Farm to Market Road 640
- Location: Wharton County
- Length: 3.016 mi (4.854 km)
- Existed: May 23, 1951–present

Farm to Market Road 640 (FM 640) is located in Wharton County. The three-mile-long highway starts at FM 102 east of Glen Flora, heads to the north and ends at FM 1161 in Spanish Camp.

A two-lane highway along its entire route, FM 640 begins at a stop sign on FM 102 1.1 miles (1.8 km) to the east of Glen Flora. According to the United States Geological Survey 1953 Glen Flora 7.5' quadrangle map, the intersection is midway between Glen Flora and the one-time community of Sorrelle. FM 640 heads straight to the north-northeast for 0.8 miles (1.3 km) then curves sharply to the northwest. Just after the curve, the highway crosses Baughman Slough, a small watercourse. After going northwest for a short distance, FM 640 bends to the right twice until it is going to the north-northeast. After about 1.0 mile (1.6 km) from the first curve, the highway curves to the north-northwest. For the next 0.9 miles (1.4 km), FM 640 goes in a straight line to the north-northwest. After curving to the left and right, FM 640 goes 0.3 miles (0.5 km) before coming to a stop sign at FM 1161 in Spanish Camp. In its final stretch the highway crosses Peach Creek and there were a number of natural gas wells in the area in 1952.

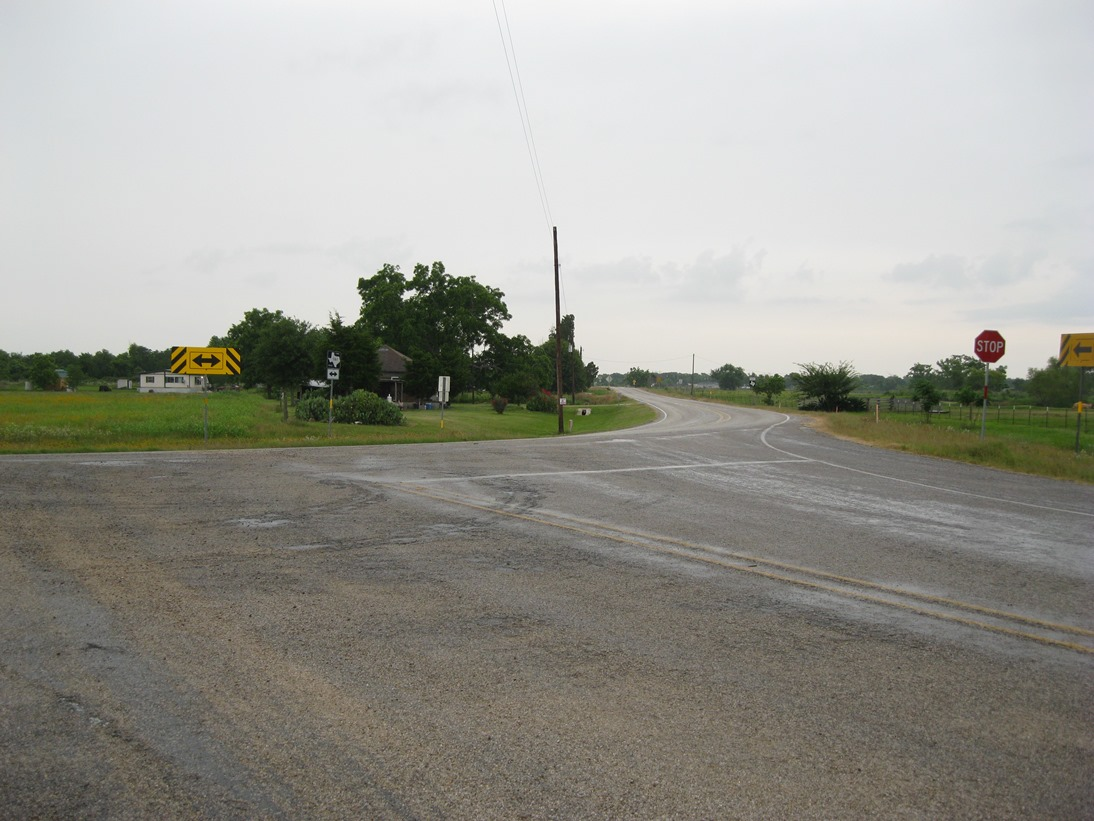
FM 1161 curves sharply to the northeast at its junction with FM 640 in Spanish Camp

On May 23, 1951, FM 640 was redesignated to start at FM 102 near Glen Flora in Wharton County and continue in a northerly direction to FM 1161 in Spanish Camp. The distance was estimated at 3.1 miles (5.0 km).

=== FM 640 (1945) ===
Farm to Market Road 640
- Location: Navarro County
- Existed: July 2, 1945–July 3, 1946

FM 640 was designated on July 2, 1945, to start in Navarro County at a cemetery to the northeast of Streetman. From the cemetery, the highway went southwest about 4.7 miles (7.6 km) to the Freestone County line. On July 3, 1946, the highway was cancelled and the right-of-way was transferred to FM 246. On September 10, 1968, this section of FM 246 was renumbered as FM 416 (FM 640 was already taken).

== FM 641 ==
Farm to Market Road 641
- Location: Navarro County
- Length: 3.260 mi (5.246 km)
- Existed: July 2, 1945–present

Farm to Market Road 641 (FM 641) is located in Navarro County. It runs from SH 14 in Currie to FM 1394 near Rushing.

FM 641 was designated on July 2, 1945, on the current route. The road at the west end did not become part of FM 1394 until November 21, 1956.

== FM 642 ==
Farm to Market Road 642
- Location: Navarro County
- Length: 8.734 mi (14.056 km)
- Existed: July 2, 1945–present

Farm to Market Road 642 (FM 642) is located in Navarro County. It runs from FM 709 to FM 638.

FM 642 was designated on July 2, 1945, to run from SH 31 (later FM 709) to 0.5 miles (0.80 km) west of Pursley. On December 17, 1952, the road was extended to FM 638, completing its current route.

== FM 643 ==
Farm to Market Road 643
- Location: Kent County
- Length: 8.179 mi (13.163 km)
- Existed: August 4, 1945–present

Farm to Market Road 643 (FM 643) is located in Kent County. It runs from SH 70 in Girard to SH 208.

FM 643 was designated on August 4, 1945, to run from SH 70 in Girard west 8.0 miles (12.9 km). On September 26, 1954, the road was extended west to FM 948 (now SH 208), completing its current route.

== FM 644 ==
Farm to Market Road 644
- Location: Scurry and Mitchell counties
- Length: 46.949 mi (75.557 km)
- Existed: July 9, 1945–present

Farm to Market Road 644 (FM 644) is located in Scurry and Mitchell counties. It runs from US 180 south and west to SH 208.

FM 644 was designated on July 9, 1945, to run from US 80 in Loraine (now BI 20-K) northward 8.0 miles (12.9 km) to the Mitchell/Scurry County Line. On December 16, 1948, the road was extended north to US 84 (later SL 367, now Bus. US 84) and south 5.0 miles (8.0 km) to a road intersection. On February 24, 1953, the road was extended north to US 180, replacing FM 1612. On October 28, 1953, the road was extended south 6.0 miles (9.7 km) to another road intersection. On September 29, 1954, the road was extended southwest 6.1 miles (9.8 km) to SH 208. On August 18, 1955, the road was changed to intersect SH 208 a mile south of where it was planned to intersect. On October 31, 1957, the road was rerouted off of I-20 and onto new construction from Loop 316 (now BI 20-K) to the current junction with I-20.

== FM 645 ==
Farm to Market Road 645
- Location: Anderson County
- Length: 14.475 mi (23.295 km)
- Existed: May 23, 1951–present

Farm to Market Road 645 (FM 645) is located in Anderson County. It runs from US 287 to US 79.

FM 645 was designated on May 23, 1951 (numbered July), to run from US 287 at Tennessee Colony southeastward to FM 320. On November 20, 1951, the road was extended southeast to US 79. On July 15, 1957, the road was extended northwest over the old route of US 287 to US 287.

=== FM 645 (1945) ===
Farm to Market Road 645
- Location: Upshur County
- Existed: August 9, 1945–July 2, 1951

The first FM 645 was designated from US 271 south of Gilmer southeast to Glenwood. Later, FM 645 was redesignated from US 271 at Bettie northwest to Thomas (also known as Simpsonville). FM 645 was cancelled on July 2, 1951, and became a portion of FM 852 (now FM 2088).

== FM 646 ==
Farm to Market Road 646
- Location: Galveston County
- Length: 22.042 mi (35.473 km)
- Existed: December 17, 1952–present

Farm to Market Road 646 (FM 646) is a designation that has been used three times. The current use is in Galveston County, from FM 2004 at Hitchcock to FM 517 at San Leon. There is a concurrency with SH 6 in Santa Fe.

The highway begins at FM 2004 in Hitchcock, Texas. It runs north to Texas State Highway 6 in Santa Fe, Texas. It briefly merges with Highway 6, heading northwest, and then branches off and keeps heading north. The highway has intersections with Farm to Market Road 1764 and Farm to Market Road 517 before turning northeast and intersecting Interstate 45 soon after. The highway continues northeast and passes into Dickinson, where it intersects Texas State Highway 3 and turns east before intersecting Farm to Market Road 1266. The highway intersects Farm to Market Road 3436 before turning northeast again. The highway intersects Texas State Highway 146 and passes through Bacliff. Once it reaches Bayshore Drive, it turns abruptly southeast and continues into San Leon. The highway ends at its second intersection with FM 517.

FM 646 was designated on December 17, 1952, from FM 517 south to SH 6 near Alta Loma. It was formerly FM 517, and before that, FM 520. On October 31, 1958, the road was extended 6.8 miles (10.9 km) to the Brazoria County line. On December 5, 1961, the section of FM 646 from SH 6 to the Brazoria County line was transferred to FM 1561. On October 8, 1964, the road was extended to FM 2004, replacing a section of FM 1561 (which was cancelled, as the remainder of FM 1561 became part of FM 2004) and creating a concurrency with SH 6. On May 25, 1976, the road was extended north 1.6 miles (2.6 km) to I-45 and FM 3002. On February 8, 1980, the road was extended to FM 517 southwest of Bacliff, replacing FM 3002. On July 20, 1982, by district request, the road was extended to FM 517 in San Leon, replacing a section of FM 3436. On June 27, 1995, the section from SH 6 to UR 517 at San Leon was transferred to UR 646, but was changed back to FM 646 on November 15, 2018.

FM 646 is the possible route of Texas State Highway 99, known as the Grand Parkway between Highway 146 and Interstate 45. It will become the third loop around the city of Houston. However, many businesses would have to be destroyed for the highway to be built along the FM, so a change to the plans is likely.

Junction list

The entire route is in Galveston County.

Location	mi	km	Destinations	Notes
Hitchcock			FM 2004 – Hitchcock, Freeport	
Santa Fe			SH 6 south – Galveston	South end of SH 6 overlap
Santa Fe			SH 6 north – Alvin	North end of SH 6 overlap
Santa Fe			FM 1764	
Dickinson			FM 517	
League City			I-45	I-45 exit 20
League City			SH 3	
League City			FM 270 north (South Egret Bay Boulevard)	
League City			FM 1266 south (Tucson Lakes Boulevard) – Dickinson	
			FM 3436 south	
Bacliff			SH 146 – Kemah, Texas City	SH 146 north is planned to be co-signed with SH 99 in the future
San Leon			FM 517 south (9th Street)	
1.000 mi = 1.609 km; 1.000 km = 0.621 mi

=== FM 646 (1945–1951) ===
Farm to Market Road 646
- Location: Fisher County
- Existed: July 23, 1945–July 11, 1951

The first use of the FM 646 designation was in Fisher County, from Rotan west 5.0 miles (8.0 km). On July 14, 1949, the road was extended southwest 4.0 miles (6.4 km) miles to a road intersection. FM 646 was cancelled on July 11, 1951, and combined with FM 611.

=== FM 646 (1951–1952) ===
Farm to Market Road 646
- Location: Polk County
- Existed: July 27, 1951–January 14, 1952

The second use of the FM 646 designation was in Polk County, from FM 62 at Camden southeast to Barnes and then south to Hortense as a replacement of a section of FM 62. This designation was short-lived as FM 646 was transferred to FM 942 six months later.

== FM 647 ==
Farm to Market Road 647
- Location: Wharton County
- Length: 7.123 mi (11.463 km)
- Existed: May 23, 1951–present

Farm to Market Road 647 (FM 647) is located in Wharton County. The 7-mile-long (11 km) highway starts at County Road 325 west of Louise, heads to the southeast and ends at County Road 336.

On May 23, 1951, FM 647 was redesignated to start at US 59 (now Loop 523) in Louise and continue southeasterly 4.0 miles (6.4 km). On November 20, 1951, the highway was extended southeast 0.8 miles (1.3 km) to County Road 336. On June 1, 1965, another section from created from US 59 (now Loop 523) in Louise west 2.5 miles (4.0 km) to County Road 325.

=== FM 647 (1945) ===
Farm to Market Road 647
- Location: Rains County
- Existed: August 13, 1945–September 26, 1945

A previous route numbered FM 647 was designated on August 13, 1945, from Emory to Dunbar. On August 22, 1945, the road was extended to 1 mile (1.6 km) south of the Hopkins County line. FM 647 was cancelled on September 26, 1945, and became a portion of SH 19.

== RM 648 ==
Ranch to Market Road 648
- Location: Gillespie County
- Length: 11.454 mi (18.433 km)
- Existed: 1945 (Note: RM 648 was previously designated as FM 648 from 1945 to 1956.)–present

Ranch to Market Road 648 (RM 648) is located in Gillespie County. RM 648 was designated on August 21, 1945, as Farm to Market Road 648 (FM 648), running from US 87 northwest to Doss and then north 2.8 miles (4.5 km). On November 13, 1953 (connecting section designated October 28), the road was extended north to US 87 south of Mason, replacing FM 863. On October 1, 1956, the section from Doss north to US 87 became part of RM 783, and the designation was changed to RM 648.

== FM 649 ==
Farm to Market Road 649
- Location: Starr, Jim Hogg, and Webb Counties
- Length: 76.817 mi (Note: The certified length given is shorter than the actual mileage, as the TxDOT description of FM 649 considers it to be discontinuous at rather than concurrent with SH 16.) (123.625 km)
- Existed: 1945–present

Farm to Market Road 649 (FM 649) is located in South Texas.

FM 649 begins in the Rio Grande Valley at a junction with US 83 in Garceno. The route travels northward through sparsely populated sections of Starr County before entering Jim Hogg County. In the vicinity of the unincorporated community of Randado, FM 649 has a brief concurrency with SH 16 before resuming its northward journey. The highway enters Webb County and passes through Mirando City before reaching its northern terminus at SH 359 west of Oilton.

FM 649 was designated in Starr County on August 13, 1945. Its southern terminus has always been at US 83 in Garceno; its original north end was at the Starr–Jim Hogg county line. On March 31, 1948, it was extended northward into Jim Hogg County, to FM 496 at Randado; this section of FM 496 became SH 16 on August 31, 1965. On August 5, 1954, the northern segment into Webb County was added, to what was then US 59 near Oilton; that section of US 59 became SH 359 19 days later. This extension replaced FM 1904, which went from FM 496 to US 59.

== FM 650 ==
Farm to Market Road 650
- Location: Starr County
- Length: 4.683 mi (7.537 km)
- Existed: 1945–present

Farm to Market Road 650 (FM 650) is located in Starr County. It runs from US 83 west and south to Fronton.

FM 650 was designated in 1945 to run from US 83, 12.0 miles (19.3 km) east of Rio Grande City, south to La Grulla. On August 23, 1945, the road was moved to a road from US 83 to Hacha. The description was corrected to the current one on January 1, 1966.

== FM 651 ==
Farm to Market Road 651
- Location: Garza, Crosby, and Floyd counties
- Length: 60.337 mi (97.103 km)
- Existed: August 23, 1945–present

Farm to Market Road 651 (FM 651) is a 60-mile-long (97 km) route located in Garza, Crosby, and Floyd counties.

FM 651 begins at an intersection with SH 207 in Post. The highway runs northeast and turns north just before the FM 261 intersection. FM 651 turns northwest just north of FM 2794 and turns north again near Crosby County Road 214. The highway enters the city of Crosbyton where it meets US 82/SH 114. FM 651 predominately runs north before ending at Floyd County Road 232.

FM 651 was designated on August 23, 1945, from Crosbyton southward 10.0 miles (16.1 km). On October 14, 1946 (agreed on May 12, 1947), FM 651 was extended north 5.7 miles (9.2 km) to Big Four School. On July 20, 1948, FM 651 was extended northward 2.0 miles (3.2 km) to White River Canyon. On May 23, 1951, FM 651 was extended south 9.5 miles (15.3 km) to a road intersection. On November 20, 1951, FM 651 was extended east 3.0 miles (4.8 km) to Kalgary. On December 17, 1952, the section of FM 651 from 3 miles (4.8 km) west of Kalgary to Kalgary was renumbered FM 2082 (now FM 261). FM 651 was extended north to US 82, replacing FM 151, and southwest to FM 122 (now SH 207), replacing FM 1618. On April 14, 1959, a spur connection in Lakeview was added.

Junction list

County	Location	mi	km	Destinations	Notes
Garza	Post			SH 207 – Post, Ralls	
Garza				FM 2008 south	
Crosby				FM 261 east – Kalgary	
Crosby				FM 2794 east – White River Reservoir, Spur	
Crosby				FM 40 west – Lubbock	
Crosby	Crosbyton			US 82 / SH 114 – Ralls, Lubbock, Dickens	
Crosby				FM 1471 west	
Crosby				FM 193 – Cone, McAdoo	
Floyd				FM 1958 east	South end of FM 1958 overlap
Floyd				FM 1958 west – Floydada	North end of FM 1958 overlap
Floyd				US 62 / US 70 – Floydada, Matador	
Floyd				County Road 232	
1.000 mi = 1.609 km; 1.000 km = 0.621 mi

== RM 652 ==
Ranch to Market Road 652
- Location: Culberson, Reeves, and Loving counties
- Length: 58.605 mi (Note: RM 652 was previously designated as FM 652 from 1951 to 1958.) (94.316 km)
- Existed: May 23, 1951–present

Ranch to Market Road 652 (RM 652) is a 58.6-mile-long (94.3 km) route in Culberson, Reeves, and Loving counties near the New Mexico state line. Its western terminus is in Culberson County at US 62/US 180. The route travels east into Reeves County, intersecting US 285 at Orla. RM 652 then crosses the Pecos River into Loving County before ending at Eddy County Rd. 1 at the New Mexico state line.

On May 23, 1951, Farm to Market Road 652 (FM 652) was assigned to a 6.5-mile (10.5 km) road from US 285 at Orla, northeastward. On November 21, 1956, it was extended northeastward 10.0 miles (16.1 km) to its current eastern terminus at the New Mexico state line. On February 27, 1958, it was redesignated RM 652 and extended 53.0 miles (85.3 km) westward from Orla to US 62 south of Pine Springs. On July 25, 1960, the western terminus was adjusted, so that RM 652 now met US 62 north approximately 10.0 miles (16.1 km) northeast of Pine Springs. This shortened RM 652 by 5.5 miles (8.9 km). On June 3, 1975, the western terminus was moved to the northeast again to its current location. The 1960-defined section of RM 652 between US 62 and RM 1108 was cancelled, and the section of RM 1108 from US 62 near the New Mexico state line southeastward 5.2 miles (8.4 km) was transferred to RM 652.

Junction list

County	Location	mi	km	Destinations	Notes
Culberson		0.0	0.0	US 62 / US 180 – El Paso, Carlsbad	Western terminus
Culberson		5.3	8.5	RM 1108 south	
Culberson		9.8	15.8	RM 1165 east	
Culberson		22.8	36.7	FM 3541 south	
Reeves	Orla	41.6	66.9	US 285 – Pecos, Carlsbad	
Loving		58.6	94.3	CR 1	Eastern terminus; continues into New Mexico as Eddie County Road 1
1.000 mi = 1.609 km; 1.000 km = 0.621 mi

=== FM 652 (1945) ===
Farm to Market Road 652
- Location: Ector County
- Existed: July 9, 1945–September 26, 1945

A previous route numbered FM 652 was designated in Ector County on July 9, 1945, from SH 51 (now US 385) north of Odessa westward to SH 302. On September 26, 1945, this route was cancelled, as it was already a part of SH 158.

== FM 653 ==
Farm to Market Road 653
- Location: Wharton County
- Length: 2.997 mi (4.823 km)
- Existed: 1945–present

Farm to Market Road 653 (FM 653) runs from SH 71 north of El Campo, southeastward to US 59; then southward to SH 71.

FM 653 was designated on July 24, 1945, to run from SH 71 south of El Campo northward to 0.8 miles (1.3 km) north of US 59. On May 23, 1951, the road was extended northwest to SH 71, completing its current route.

== FM 654 ==
Farm to Market Road 654
- Location: Foard County
- Length: 4.908 mi (7.899 km)
- Existed: May 23, 1951–present

Farm to Market Road 654 (FM 654) runs from US 70, west of Crowell, southwestward to Good Creek.

FM 654 was designated on May 23, 1951, on its current route.

=== FM 654 (1945) ===
Farm to Market Road 654
- Location: Bowie County
- Existed: August 13, 1945–October 1, 1946

A previous route numbered FM 654 was designated on August 13, 1945, from SH 26, 2 miles (3.2 km) south of De Kalb, west 4.0 miles (6.4 km). FM 654 was cancelled on October 1, 1946, and became a portion of FM 561. This portion of FM 561 became part of FM 44 in 1958.

== FM 655 ==
Farm to Market Road 655
- Location: Brazoria County
- Length: 5.792 mi (9.321 km)
- Existed: August 24, 1945–present

Farm to Market Road 655 (FM 655) is located in Brazoria County. It provides access to the Texas Department of Criminal Justice's Ramsey, Terrell, and Stringfellow units. The road itself is approximately 5 miles (8.0 km) long, and at the western terminus, two spurs to the north and south provide prison access. The spurs have a combined length of around 2 miles (3.2 km).

FM 655 begins as two spurs at the prison complex; the mainline of FM 655 follows the northern spur while the southern is designated FM Spur 655. The two spurs travel through farm fields before joining. From here, FM 655 continues east through farmland within the prison complex. The highway then heads into Bonney and ends at FM 521.

FM 655 was designated on August 24, 1945, to run from SH 288 (now FM 521) west to the Ramsey Prison Farm. On January 11, 1980, FM 655 was defined onto its current alignment, with the southern spur added.

== FM 656 ==
Farm to Market Road 656
- Location: Hall and Motley counties
- Length: 21.095 mi (33.949 km)
- Existed: 1945–present

Farm to Market Road 656 (FM 656) runs from SH 70 southeast of Turkey southeastward to FM 94 in Northfield.

FM 656 was designated on August 22, 1945, to run from SH 18 (which became part of SH 70 on October 10, 1947) near Turkey southeast 5.5 miles (8.9 km). On May 26, 1949, the road was extended southeast 2.0 miles (3.2 km) to a road intersection. On October 28, 1953, the road was extended southeast 2.8 miles (4.5 km) to a county road. On October 18, 1960, the road was extended southeast to FM 94, replacing FM 2641 (connecting section designated September 27).

== FM 657 ==
Farm to Market Road 657
- Location: Hall County
- Length: 15.032 mi (24.192 km)
- Existed: 1945–present

Farm to Market Road 657 (FM 657) runs from SH 256 west of Lakeview southward to SH 86.

FM 657 was designated on August 22, 1945, to run from SH 256 east of Lakeview south to Plaska. On November 27, 1948, the road was extended west 2.7 miles (4.3 km) to a road intersection. A connection to Plaska was added, but that was not added to the description until May 20, 1949. On July 15, 1949, the road was extended west and north to SH 256 west of Lakeview. On December 14, 1959, the road was rerouted south over FM 2472 to SH 86. The section from FM 2472 to FM 1041 became part of FM 1041, and the section from FM 1041 to SH 256 (including the connection to Plaska) was renumbered to new FM 2472.

== FM 658 ==
Farm to Market Road 658
- Location: Hall County
- Length: 11.135 mi (17.920 km)
- Existed: 1945–present

Farm to Market Road 658 (FM 658) runs from US 287 southeast of Estelline southward to FM 94.

FM 658 was designated on August 22, 1945, to run from US 287 southward 3.0 miles (4.8 km). On July 15, 1949, the road extended south 2.0 miles (3.2 km). On May 23, 1951, the road was extended south 4.2 miles (6.8 km) to a road intersection. On October 28, 1953, the road was extended south to FM 94, completing its current route.

== FM 659 ==
Farm to Market Road 659
- Location: El Paso County
- Length: 9.748 mi (Note: The certified length given is shorter than the actual mileage, as the TxDOT description of FM 659 considers it to be discontinuous at Loop 375.) (15.688 km)
- Existed: September 4, 1945–present

Farm to Market Road 659 (FM 659) is located in El Paso. It is 9.8 miles (15.8 km) long and known locally as North Zaragoza Road.

FM 659 begins at an intersection with FM 76 in southeastern El Paso, with Zaragoza Road continuing south to the El Paso Ysleta Port of Entry at the Ysleta–Zaragoza International Bridge. The highway travels in a slight northeast direction and crosses I-10. At I-10, FM 659's name briefly changes from Zaragoza Road to George Dieter Road. The highway turns right at George Dieter Road, with the Zaragoza Road designation continuing. FM 659 travels northeast through a heavily developed area of the city, passing by many residential areas and commercial shopping centers. FM 659 turns right at Montwood Drive before briefly traveling along the frontage road of Loop 375. Past Loop 375, FM 659 resumes running in its northeast direction before ending at US 62/US 180 near Homestead Meadows South.

FM 659 was designated on September 4, 1945, along its current route. An 2.7-mile (4.3 km) extension south from FM 76 to the Rio Grande was proposed on December 16, 1948, but cancelled on February 25, 1954. On June 27, 1995, the entire route was redesignated Urban Road 659 (UR 659). The designation reverted to FM 659 with the elimination of the Urban Road system on November 15, 2018.

Junction list

The entire route is in El Paso, El Paso County.

mi	km	Destinations	Notes
0.0	0.0	FM 76 (North Loop Drive)	
1.3	2.1	I-10 (Gateway Boulevard)	I-10 exit 32
4.9	7.9	Loop 375 south (Joe Battle Boulevard)	Loop 375 exit 40
5.1	8.2	Loop 375 north (Joe Battle Boulevard)	Loop 375 exit 40
9.9	15.9	US 62 / US 180 (Montana Avenue)	Interchange
1.000 mi = 1.609 km; 1.000 km = 0.621 mi

== FM 660 ==
Farm to Market Road 660
- Location: Ellis County
- Length: 16.654 mi (26.802 km)
- Existed: August 31, 1945–present

Farm to Market Road 660 (FM 660) is located in Ellis County.

FM 660 begins in rural eastern Ellis County at an intersection with SH 34 just over 1 mile (1.6 km) east of Ennis. It travels northbound from the east–west stretch of SH 34, bridging Fourmile Creek before it banks east as it merges onto Crisp Road. As it passes through the unincorporated community of Crisp, it then banks north and snakes towards an intersection with FM 813. At this intersection, FM 813 terminates as FM 660 banks east through Bristol, before banking north and making its way down Sugar Ridge. As it travels northbound, FM 660 briefly makes its way through the Trinity River Floodplain and crests over a levee locally known as "The Bristol Bump" because of its sharp and sudden crest potentially sending unsuspecting drivers airborne for a brief moment. FM 660 then travels northeast towards Ferris through the foothills bordering the Trinity River Floodplain, intersecting with FM 710 roughly 6 miles (9.7 km) northeast of Bristol and 2.5 miles (4.0 km) east of Ferris. FM 660 then intersects with Interstate 45 just before reaching its northern terminus with Business Interstate 45 in downtown Ferris.

FM 660 was designated on August 31, 1945. It consisted of an 8.0 miles (12.9 km) stretch connecting Bristol to the SH 34 intersection. The northern extension to Ferris was later added on April 1, 1948, bringing FM 660 to its present-day length.

Junction list

The entire route is in Ellis County.

Location	mi	km	Destinations	Notes
	0.0	0.0	SH 34 – Ennis, Kaufman	
	6.6	10.6	FM 813 west – Palmer	
	14.2	22.9	FM 780 east	
Ferris	16.3	26.2	I-45 – Ennis, Dallas	I-45 exit 266
Ferris	16.7	26.9	I-45 BL – Ennis, Dallas	
1.000 mi = 1.609 km; 1.000 km = 0.621 mi

== FM 661 ==
Farm to Market Road 661
- Location: Ellis County
- Length: 2.817 mi (4.534 km)
- Existed: 1945–present

Farm to Market Road 661 (FM 661) runs from US 287 to Britton.

FM 661 was designated on August 21, 1945, on the current route.

== FM 662 ==
Farm to Market Road 662
- Location: Midland County
- Length: 5.275 mi (8.489 km)
- Existed: September 26, 1979–present

Farm to Market Road 662 (FM 662) is located in Midland County.

The current FM 662 was designated on September 26, 1979, from FM 1369 (now SH 158) to Industrial Avenue at a distance of 3.2 miles (5.1 km). On August 29, 1989, the highway was extended 2.1 miles (3.4 km) to FM 1788. On June 27, 1995, the entire route was redesignated Urban Road 662 (UR 662). The designation reverted to FM 662 with the elimination of the Urban Road system on November 15, 2018.

=== FM 662 (1945) ===
Farm to Market Road 662
- Location: Ellis and Navarro counties
- Existed: August 31, 1945–November 1, 1961

A previous route numbered FM 662 was designated on August 31, 1945, from US 75 (now I-45), 2.8 miles (4.5 km) south of Ennis, to Hopewell School. On October 31, 1957, the road was extended east 6.0 miles (9.7 km) to FM 1129. FM 662 was cancelled on November 1, 1961, and transferred to FM 85.

== FM 663 ==
Farm to Market Road 663
- Location: Ellis County
- Length: 4.832 mi (7.776 km)
- Existed: 1945–present

Farm to Market Road 663 (FM 663) runs from Midlothian southward to FM 875.

FM 663 was designated on August 31, 1945, to run from US 287 (now Bus. US 287) south and west to Mountain Peak. On October 25, 1955, the section from FM 875 to Mountain Peak became part of FM 875.

== FM 664 ==
Farm to Market Road 664
- Location: Ellis County
- Length: 22.076 mi (35.528 km)
- Existed: 1945–present

Farm to Market Road 664 (FM 664) is located in Ellis County.

FM 664, known locally as Ovilla Road, is a major access road for the northern sections of Ellis County. It begins at Bus. US 287, the former route of US 287 in Waxahachie. It briefly travels north along the de facto frontage road for southbound I-35E at exit 401B. After passing the interstate, the route continues north approximately nine miles into Ovilla, where it makes an abrupt right-hand turn and continues to the east for the remainder of its length. (Note: Although traveling west–east from Ovilla to Ferris, the route is signed south–north.) It crosses I-35E again (passing over the Boxcar Willie Memorial Overpass) and also SH 342 in Red Oak before terminating at FM 983 near Ferris.

FM 664 was designated on August 31, 1945, and ran from near Waxahachie to Ovilla, with a southern terminus at US 287 (later Loop 528, now signed as US 287 Business). It was lengthened to US 77 (now the I-35E freeway) on September 20, 1961. An extension east 4 miles (6.4 km) on June 1, 1965, and another extension to Ferris on June 4, 1970, brought the route to its current length.

Junction list

The entire route is in Ellis County.

Location	mi	km	Destinations	Notes
Waxahachie	0.0	0.0	I-35E / Bus. US 287	I-35E exit 401B
Waxahachie	1.4	2.3	US 287 – Fort Worth, Ennis	Interchange
	6.4	10.3	FM 1387 west – Midlothian	
Red Oak	13.0	20.9	I-35E (US 77)	Boxcar Willie Memorial Overpass; I-35E exit 410B
Red Oak	14.8	23.8	SH 342 (Central Boulevard) – Lancaster	
Ferris	22.1	35.6	FM 983 – Ferris, Rockett	
1.000 mi = 1.609 km; 1.000 km = 0.621 mi

== FM 665 ==
Farm to Market Road 665
- Location: Jim Wells and Nueces counties
- Length: 46.066 mi (74.136 km)
- Existed: 1945–present

Farm to Market Road 665 (FM 665) is located in Jim Wells and Nueces counties.

FM 665 begins in downtown Alice, at an intersection with SH 44 / SH 359. The route travels to the south along Cameron Street before turning to the east, and passes Alice International Airport before entering Nueces County. FM 665 intersects I-69E/US 77 in Driscoll and passes through the town of Petronila before turning more toward the northeast to enter Corpus Christi. The route intersects SH 357 in the outskirts of Corpus Christi before crossing the SH 358 expressway and entering downtown. FM 665 ends at an intersection with Spur 544 (signed as a business route of SH 44).

FM 665 was designated on September 10, 1945, from US 77 in Driscoll to SH 44 in Corpus Christi. It was extended to Alice on November 2, 1955, replacing a portion of FM 666 from Driscoll to current FM 666 and the entirety of FM 736 from FM 70 to SH 359, though signage did not change until the updated official travel map was given out. On June 27, 1995, the portion east of SH 357 in Corpus Christi was redesignated Urban Road 665 (UR 665). The designation of this section reverted to FM 665 with the elimination of the Urban Road system on November 15, 2018.

== FM 666 ==
Farm to Market Road 666
- Location: San Patricio and Nueces counties
- Length: 36.594 mi (58.892 km)
- Existed: September 10, 1945–present

Farm to Market Road 666 (FM 666) is located in Nueces and San Patricio counties. It begins at FM 70 in Bishop. FM 666 travels north, intersecting SH 44 in Banquete and FM 624 in Bluntzer. The road crosses into San Patricio County at the city of San Patricio, and near the end of its route is parallel to I-37 to its east. FM 666 ends in the city of Mathis at SH 359; the roadway continues as a business route of SH 359 through Mathis.

FM 666 was designated on September 10, 1945, from SH 44 in Banquete southward and eastward to US 77 in Driscoll. On July 14, 1949, the designation was extended north to US 59 (present-day SH 359) in Mathis. On September 21, 1955, the section of FM 666 from US 77 to its current junction with FM 665 was transferred to FM 665. On October 31, 1957, FM 666 was extended south to its current southern terminus at FM 70.

In 2018, the section of FM 666 between FM 624 and SH 44 was designated the Kollyn Gene Barton Memorial Highway. Barton, a Banquete High School student, was killed in a vehicle accident along the highway in 2016.

Junction list

County	Location	mi	km	Destinations	Notes
Nueces		0.0	0.0	FM 70 – Agua Dulce, Bishop	
Nueces		8.5	13.7	FM 665 – Alice, Driscoll	
Nueces		11.8	19.0	FM 2826 east	
Nueces	Banquete	16.1	25.9	SH 44 – Alice, Corpus Christi	
Nueces		19.5	31.4	FM 1833 west	
Nueces	Bluntzer	22.5	36.2	FM 624 – Orange Grove, Corpus Christi	
Nueces		23.2	37.3	FM 3088 west	
San Patricio	Mathis	36.7	59.1	SH 359 / FM 3377 north – Alice, Skidmore	
1.000 mi = 1.609 km; 1.000 km = 0.621 mi

== FM 667 ==
Farm to Market Road 667
- Location: Ellis and Navarro counties
- Length: 21.216 mi (34.144 km)
- Existed: 1945–present

Farm to Market Road 667 (FM 667) runs from SH 34 near Italy, southeastward via Frost to FM 744; and from another point on FM 744, southeastward to SH 31.

FM 667 was designated on January 11, 1945 (agreed March 2 in Ellis County and March 13 in Navarro County), to run from SH 34 to SH 22 in Frost. On October 31, 1957, a second section from Spur 30 in Frost southeast 3.4 miles (5.5 km) was added, creating a concurrency with Spur 30. On January 4, 1960, Spur 30 from SH 22 southeast 0.3 miles (0.48 km) became part of FM 667. On September 20, 1961, the road was extended southeast to FM 918. On October 29, 1962, FM 918 became part of FM 744, and FM 667 extended southeast to SH 31.

== FM 668 ==
Farm to Market Road 668
- Location: Fisher and Jones counties
- Length: 6.061 mi (9.754 km)
- Existed: 1945–present

Farm to Market Road 668 (FM 668) runs from FM 2142 southeastward and eastward to FM 126.

FM 668 was designated on September 26, 1945 (agreed on October 8), to run from FM 57 west to Celotex Plant. On December 13, 1956, the road was extended west to FM 1224 in Royston. On March 29, 1957, this extension was cancelled in exchange for creating FM 2142. On October 31, 1957, the road was extended north to FM 2142. On September 5, 1973, the road was extended east to FM 126, completing its current route.

== FM 669 ==
Farm to Market Road 669
- Location: Howard, Borden, and Garza counties
- Length: 68.805 mi (110.731 km)
- Existed: 1945–present

Farm to Market Road 669 (FM 669) is located in West Texas. It extends in a northerly direction for 68.8 miles (110.7 km) from Big Spring in Howard County to Post in Garza County.

Beginning at a complex junction with Farm to Market Road 700 and Texas State Highway 350 on the north side of Big Spring, Farm to Market Road 669 initially runs for 15 miles (24 km) in a northerly direction across the level plains of the Llano Estacado, passing numerous cotton fields and rural farm homes. Near the intersection of FM 1785, FM 669 drops off the Caprock and enters the rolling ranch and oil country of Borden County. The undulating, broken land of Borden County was carved by numerous ephemeral tributaries of the upper Colorado River that typically originate as springs along the Caprock Escarpment to the west and generally flow across the county in an easterly direction.

After crossing the Colorado River, about 5 miles (8.0 km) north of the Howard–Borden county line, FM 669 continues north toward Gail, the county seat of Borden County. Near Gail, one passes two prominent erosional remnants of the Llano Estacado. To the south of Gail, one can see a conspicuous landmark known as Mushaway Peak (also known as Muchakooaga, Muchaque Peak or Cordova Peak); this small butte stands on high ground between Grape Creek and Bull Creek, two tributaries of the upper Colorado River. A much larger mesa, called Gail Mountain, stands on the western edge of Gail and provides a scenic backdrop for this small town.

In Gail, FM 669 crosses U.S. Highway 180, which runs west–east from Lamesa to Snyder and beyond. Continuing north, FM 669 draws closer to the edge of the Llano Estacado, which can be seen 5 miles (8.0 km) to the west. Approximately 6 miles (9.7 km) north of Gail is a junction with FM 2350, which leads to Fluvanna and the Brazos Wind Ranch, to the east.

Farther north, near the Borden–Garza county line, FM 669 reaches a high point that divides the drainage of the upper Brazos and Colorado rivers. Along this drainage divide, the land is highly denuded with many small buttes and hoodoos. Less than a mile north of the county line is a historical marker that describes an archaeological site where the "Garza Point" was first identified. These distinctive arrowheads were constructed from local flint, chert, and obsidian by Native Americans living and hunting in this area around A.D. 1440 to 1500.

Around 5 miles (8.0 km) north of the Borden–Garza county line, FM 669 crosses the Double Mountain Fork, a major tributary of the upper Brazos River. From the colorful sandy bed of the Double Mountain Fork, FM 669 climbs 450 feet (140 m) over a distance of 6 miles (9.7 km) as it ascends the Caprock to the high plains of the Llano Estacado. FM 669 remains on the level plains for a short distance of only 3 miles (4.8 km) before suddenly dropping off the Caprock and descending 200 feet (61 m) back to the rolling plains and to the town of Post, the county seat of Garza County. Within the city limits of Post, FM 669 terminates at a junction with U.S. Route 380.

FM 669 was designated on September 24, 1945, from US 180 at Gail south 10.0 miles (16.1 km). On March 30, 1949, FM 669 was extended south 2.5 miles (4.0 km) to a county road. On November 20, 1951, FM 669 was extended to FM 1584 at Vealmoor. On May 5, 1952, FM 669 was extended to US 87, replacing FM 1857. On October 30, 1953, the section of FM 669 from the current junction with FM 1785 to US 87 was renumbered FM 1785. FM 669 instead extended south to SH 350 near Big Spring, replacing FM 817. On November 21, 1956, FM 669 was extended north to FM 1313. On May 1, 1965, the section of FM 1313 from FM 669 to US 380 was transferred to FM 669.

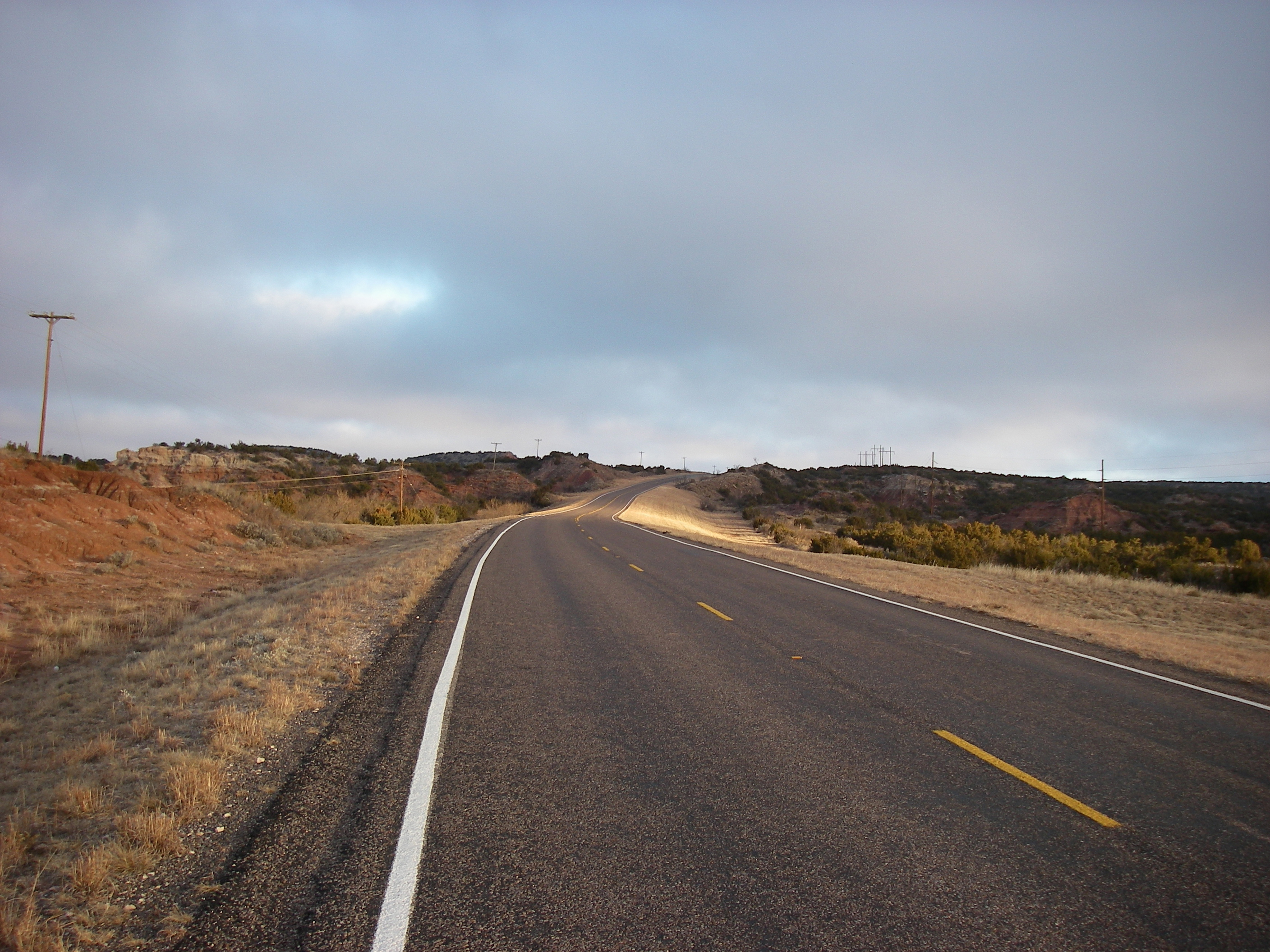
FM 669 climbing the Caprock Escarpment

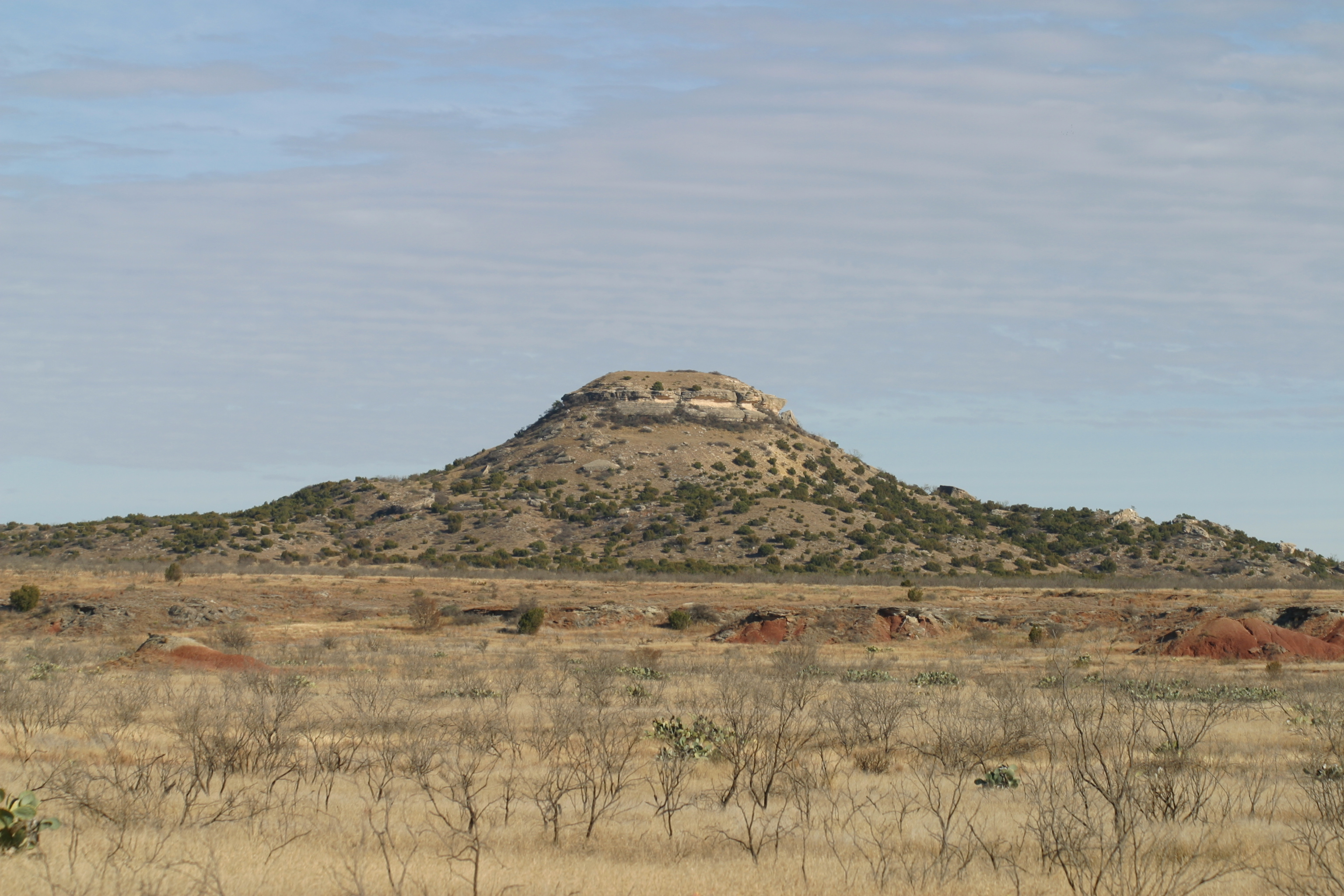
Mushaway Peak, Borden County

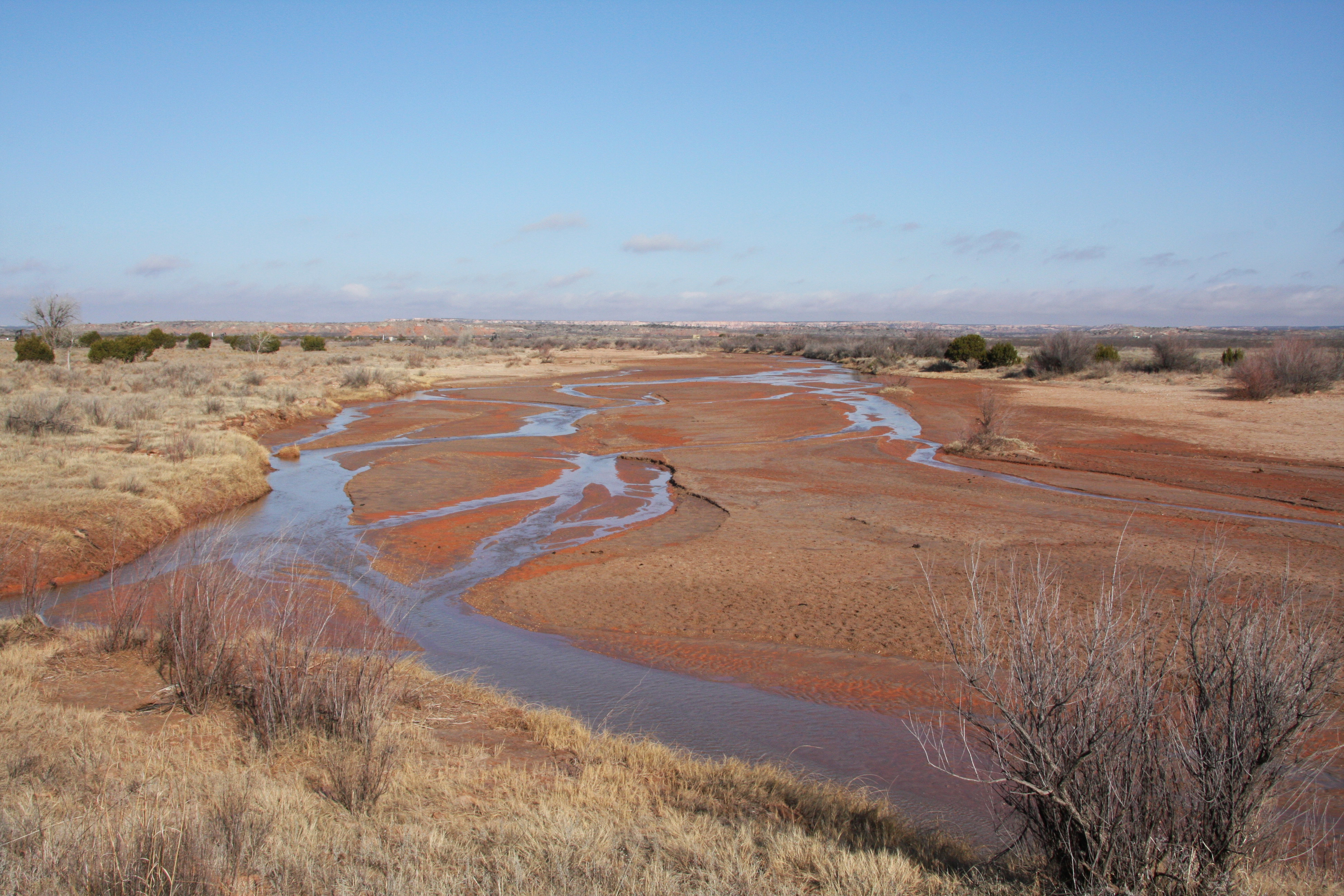
Double Mountain Fork Brazos River

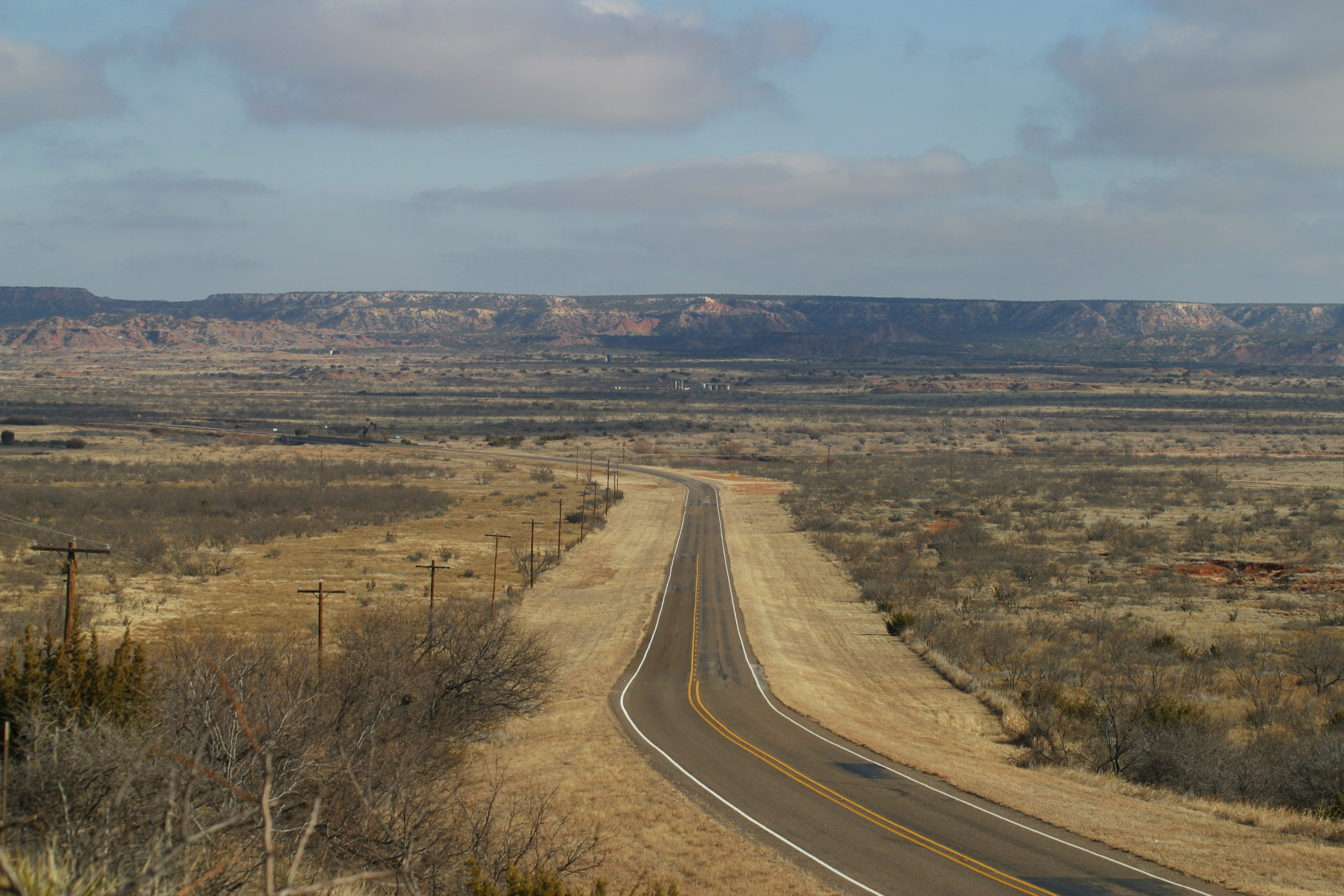
FM 669, Garza County

Junction list

County	Location	mi	km	Destinations	Notes
Howard		0.0	0.0	FM 700 to SH 350 – Big Spring, Snyder	
Howard		10.8	17.4	FM 846 west – Knott	South end of FM 846 overlap
Howard		11.7	18.8	FM 846 east – Coahoma	North end of FM 846 overlap
Borden		18.9	30.4	FM 1785 – Vealmoor	
Borden	Gail	37.1	59.7	US 180 – Lamesa, Snyder	
Borden		44.4	71.5	FM 2350 east – Fluvanna	
Garza		65.7	105.7	FM 1313 west – Grassland	
Garza	Post	68.8	110.7	US 380 – Tahoka, Clairemont	
1.000 mi = 1.609 km; 1.000 km = 0.621 mi: Concurrency terminus

== FM 670 ==
Farm to Market Road 670
- Location: Mitchell County
- Length: 15.227 mi (24.505 km)
- Existed: 1945–present

Farm to Market Road 670 (FM 670) runs from SH 163 southwest of Spade Community, northward to I-20 west of Westbrook; then from BI 20-H at Westbrook northward and eastward to FM 1229.

FM 670 was designated on November 28, 1945, to run from US 80 (later SL 333; now BI 20-H) in Westbrook north and west 3.7 miles (6.0 km) to Butler Camp. On February 24, 1953, the road was extended south to SH 163, replacing FM 1808. On October 31, 1958, the road was rerouted northeast to FM 1229, with the old route west to Butler Camp renumbered FM 1308.

== FM 671 ==
Farm to Market Road 671
- Location: Caldwell County
- Length: 7.779 mi (12.519 km)
- Existed: 1945–present

Farm to Market Road 671 (FM 671) runs from US 183 south of Lockhart, southward via Joliet to SH 80 at Stairtown.

FM 671 was designated on December 21, 1945, to run from SH 29 (rerouted in 1949; now US 183) in Joliet to SH 80 in Stairtown. On December 17, 1952, the road was extended north to US 183, completing its current route.

== FM 672 ==
Farm to Market Road 672
- Location: Caldwell and Bastrop counties
- Length: 13.256 mi (21.333 km)
- Existed: 1945–present

Farm to Market Road 672 (FM 672) runs from US 183 in Lockhart, northeastward to FM 812, southeast of SH 21.

FM 672 was designated on December 21, 1945, to run from SH 29 (now US 183) in Lockhart east through Dale to FM 20. On May 1, 1947, the section from Lockhart to Dale was cancelled in exchange for the creation of FM 713. On November 23, 1948, a section from Lockhart northeast 6.8 miles (10.9 km) was added. On November 20, 1951, the section from Dale to FM 20 was renumbered FM 1854, with the remaining section being extended northwest to Lytton Springs. On October 28, 1953, the road was extended southwest to FM 1185. On August 24, 1955, the road was extended northwest to SH 21. On May 5, 1966, the road was rerouted to end at FM 812, completing its current route, with the old route to SH 21 becoming an extension of FM 1854.

== FM 673 ==
Farm to Market Road 673
- Location: Bee County
- Length: 26.118 mi (42.033 km)
- Existed: 1945–present

Farm to Market Road 673 (FM 673) runs from US 59 in Beeville, northwestward to SH 72 in Pawnee.

FM 673 was designated on December 17, 1945 (agreed January 10, 1946), on the current route. The only change happened on September 30, 1969, when the road was relocated in Beeville, decreasing the length by 0.8 miles (1.3 km).

== RM 674 ==
Ranch to Market Road 674
- Location: Kinney and Edwards counties
- Length: 56.436 mi (90.825 km)
- Existed: October 24, 1945 (Note: RM 674 was previously designated as FM 674 from 1945 to 1959.)–present

Ranch to Market Road 674 (RM 674) runs from Ranch to Market Road 334 (RM 334) in Brackettville northward and northeastward to U.S. Route 377 (US 377), west of Rocksprings.

RM 674 was designated on January 18, 1946 (agreed October 24, 1945) as Farm to Market Road 674 (FM 674), running from FM 334 (now RM 334) north 10.0 miles (16.1 km). On November 23, 1948, the road was extended north 8.5 miles (13.7 km) to Griffin Creek. On April 14, 1949, a second section from SH 41 (now US 377) southwest 8.7 miles (14.0 km) was added, replacing FM 1020 and creating a gap. on July 15, 1949, the northern section was extended southwest 6.0 miles (9.7 km). On May 23, 1951, the northern section was extended south 4.0 miles (6.4 km). On November 20, 1951, the northern section was extended south 2.8 miles (4.5 km). On December 17, 1952, the gap was closed, completing its current route. On October 17, 1959, the designation was changed to RM 674.

== FM 675 ==
Farm to Market Road 675
- Location: Cameron County
- Length: 4.168 mi (6.708 km)
- Existed: 1945–present

Farm to Market Road 675 (FM 675) runs from FM 1479 in Rangerville southeastward to FM 2520.

FM 675 was designated on July 3, 1945, on the current route, though FM 1479 and FM 2520 did not exist until later.

== FM 676 ==
Farm to Market Road 676
- Location: Hidalgo County
- Length: 7.889 mi (12.696 km)
- Existed: 1945–present

Farm to Market Road 676 (FM 676) is located in Hidalgo County.

FM 676 begins at an intersection with FM 492 in northeastern Doffing. The highway travels in a generally eastern direction along Mile 5 Road and intersects SH 364 in La Homa, then enters Alton. In Alton, FM 676 intersects SH 107 and FM 494. State maintenance for the highway ends at an intersection with FM 2220 at the McAllen city limits.

The Alton, Texas bus crash occurred along FM 676 in Alton on September 21, 1989.

FM 676 was designated on June 26, 1945, from SH 107 5 miles (8.0 km) north of Mission eastward 2.5 miles (4.0 km). On July 15, 1949, FM 676 was extended west 4.0 miles (6.4 km) to a road that would become part of FM 492 on May 23, 1951. On May 23, 1951, FM 676 was extended east 0.5 miles (0.80 km) to Taylor Road. On September 28, 2017, FM 676 was extended east 1 mile (1.6 km) to FM 2220.

== FM 677 ==
Farm to Market Road 677
- Location: Montague County
- Length: 30.395 mi (48.916 km)
- Existed: 1946–present

Farm to Market Road 677 (FM 677) is located in Montague County.

FM 677 is one of the longest farm to market roads in Montague County, and is a two-lane route for its entire length. It begins in Forestburg at a junction with FM 455. It travels northward through the rural eastern part of the county, reaching St. Jo and an intersection with US 82. It continues northward, through the unincorporated communities of Capps Corner and Illinois Bend, close to the Cooke County line. It briefly turns to the west before resuming its northward journey toward the Red River. The FM 677 designation ends as the route crosses into Love County, Oklahoma across the Taovoyas Indian Bridge; the roadway continues as Oklahoma State Highway 89.

A spur route, FM Spur 677, is located in Illinois Bend, traveling northward from mainline FM 677 approximately 0.268 mi (0.431 km).

FM 677 was designated on January 31, 1946, northward from US 82 in St. Jo approximately 5.3 mi (8.5 km). It was extended north 2.5 miles (4.0 km) on May 23, 1951, south 2.9 miles (4.7 km) on November 20, 1951, and again southward on December 17, 1952, to Hardy near the FM 1630 intersection. The route's designation was extended further northward to 3 miles (4.8 km) north of Capps Corner on December 2, 1953, and to Illinois Bend on September 29, 1954; the same day also so the lengthening to Forestburg. The connection to the Red River was made on April 24, 1958, and the concurrency with US 82 in St. Jo was removed on June 30, 1961. The connection to Oklahoma was made on December 20, 1988. The spur connection was added on April 25, 1996.

== FM 678 ==
Farm to Market Road 678
- Location: Cooke County
- Length: 23.743 mi (38.211 km)
- Existed: 1946–present

Farm to Market Road 678 (FM 678) runs from FM 372 & FM 51 in Gainesville eastward and northward to Dexter.

FM 678 was designated on January 18, 1946 (agreed February 11), to run from Gainesville east to the State Training School for Girls (now the Gainesville State School). On October 18, 1954, the road was extended east and north to a road intersection 1.0 mile (1.6 km) south of Sturgeon, replacing FM 1203 (the connecting section was designated September 27), with a 0.2 miles (0.32 km) spur connection to Callisburg being added (this spur was the old route of FM 1203, while what became FM 1203 north of there was originally FM 1629). On June 21, 1955, the road was extended north 5.1 miles (8.2 km) to Dexter. On May 21, 1964, the spur connection to Callisburg was transferred to FM 2896, completing its current route.

== FM 679 ==
Farm to Market Road 679
- Location: Comanche and Eastland counties
- Length: 7.161 mi (11.525 km)
- Existed: April 23, 1958–present

Farm to Market Road 679 (FM 679) runs from FM 587 at Duster, northward to FM 8 at Gorman.

FM 679 was designated on April 23, 1958, as a renumbering of a portion of FM 588 when that road was truncated.

=== FM 679 (1946) ===
Farm to Market Road 679
- Location: Randall County
- Existed: February 21, 1946–December 14, 1956

A previous route numbered FM 679 was designated on February 21, 1946, from US 60 at Umbarger south to Buffalo Lake. On October 25, 1947, the northern terminus was moved to a county road north of US 60 (now FM 1062). On September 21, 1955, the road was extended south 3.8 miles (6.1 km) along Buffalo Lake. On November 21, 1956, the road was extended south to the Castro County line. FM 679 was cancelled on December 14, 1956, and transferred to FM 168.

== FM 680 ==
Farm to Market Road 680
- Location: Hardeman County
- Length: 16.787 mi (27.016 km)
- Existed: May 23, 1951–present

Farm to Market Road 680 (FM 680) runs from US 287 at Goodlett to the Texas-Oklahoma state line.

FM 680 was designated on May 23, 1951, to run from US 287 north 7.7 miles (12.4 km) to a road intersection. On October 28, 1953, the road was extended north 4.1 miles (6.6 km) to another road intersection. On February 13, 1976, the road was extended west and north to Watson Road. On May 26, 2016, the road was extended north to the Oklahoma border, its current terminus.

=== FM 680 (1946) ===
Farm to Market Road 680
- Location: Randall County
- Existed: February 21, 1946–April 11, 1946

A previous route numbered FM 680 was designated on February 21, 1946, as an extension of Georgia Street in Amarillo, from the Potter County line south to US 87. Two months later FM 680 was cancelled and transferred to FM 286.

== FM 681 ==
Farm to Market Road 681
- Location: Hidalgo County
- Length: 29.048 mi (46.748 km)
- Existed: 1946–present

Farm to Market Road 681 (FM 681) runs from SH 107 at Cantu to FM 1017 in Puerto Rico.

FM 681 was designated on April 16, 1946, to run from SH 107 to the entrance to Moore Airfield. On November 23, 1948, the road was extended to McCook. On November 30, 1949, the road was extended north to FM 1017, completing its current route.

== FM 682 ==
Farm to Market Road 682
- Location: DeWitt and Victoria counties
- Length: 19.224 mi (30.938 km)
- Existed: 1946–present

Farm to Market Road 682 (FM 682) runs from SH 111 in Yoakum to a junction with US 77 near the DeWitt/Victoria County line.

FM 682 was designated on April 16, 1946, on the current route. This designation resulted in the cancellation of the original FM 241 and FM 242 in DeWitt County; these FM numbers have since been used elsewhere.

== FM 683 ==
Farm to Market Road 683
- Location: Carson County
- Length: 6.235 mi (10.034 km)
- Existed: 1946–present

Farm to Market Road 683 (FM 683) runs from US 60 near the Potter County line, northward to FM 293.

FM 683 was designated on April 16, 1946, to run from SH 136 east and south to US 60 as a redesignation of War Highway 9. On December 17, 1956, the road was rerouted north over FM 293 Spur (to avoid confusion with the other FM 293 Spur), so the section from SH 136 east to the FM 293 spur connection was renumbered FM 245.

== FM 684 ==
Farm to Market Road 684
- Location: Floyd and Motley counties
- Length: 17.868 mi (28.756 km)
- Existed: May 23, 1951–present

Farm to Market Road 684 (FM 684) runs from FM 28 approx. 2.8 miles southeast of Dougherty, eastward to SL 42 in Roaring Springs, and from SH 70 southeast of Roaring Springs, eastward to a road intersection.

FM 684 was designated on May 23, 1951, to run from SH 70 east to a road intersection. The road was extended west to FM 28 on October 31, 1958, completing its current route and correcting a concurrency with SL 42.

=== FM 684 (1946) ===
Farm to Market Road 684
- Location: Dallas County
- Existed: February 23, 1946–August 8, 1946

A previous route numbered FM 684 was designated on February 23, 1945 (agreed May 3, 1946, effective June 1, 1946), from US 80 near the triple overpass at Dallas to Irving and then on to SH 183 close to where Belt Line Road intersects SH 183 near the Dallas–Tarrant county line. On August 8, 1946, FM 684 was cancelled and reassigned to SH 356.

== FM 685 ==
Farm to Market Road 685
- Location: Travis and Williamson Counties
- Length: 4.392 mi (Note: The certified length given is shorter than the actual mileage, as the TxDOT description of FM 685 considers it to be discontinuous at SH 130.) (7.068 km)
- Existed: 1946–present

Farm to Market Road 685 (FM 685) is located in Greater Austin.

FM 685 begins in Pflugerville at the northern terminus of Dessau Road and at the eastern terminus of FM 1825. The route runs to the northeast through Pflugerville to an interchange with the SH 45 Toll / SH 130 Toll toll road. From here, FM 685 runs north along the frontage road of the toll road, before separating from SH 130 in southern Hutto. The route continues to the northeast before ending at a junction with US 79 in central Hutto.

FM 685 was designated in Williamson County on May 15, 1946, on an existing roadway, running from US 79 at Hutto southward to the Travis County line. The designation was extended into Travis County and Pflugerville on December 17, 1952, to its current southern terminus at FM 1825.

When the SH 130 toll road was constructed, the segment between Pflugerville and Hutto used the right-of-way of FM 685. The FM 685 designation was subsequently applied to the frontage roads of the toll road.

In 2017, the segment of FM 685 in Hutto was designated Chris Kelley Boulevard. Kelley, a sergeant with the Hutto Police Department, was killed in the line of duty in 2015.

Junction list

County	Location	mi	km	Destinations	Notes
Travis	Pflugerville	0.0	0.0	FM 1825 west (Pecan Street)	
Travis	Pflugerville	2.3	3.7	SH 45 Toll south / SH 130 Toll south	SH 130 exit 428A
Travis	Pflugerville	2.9	4.7	SH 45 west (Wilke Lane) / Kelley Lane	
Williamson		6.0	9.7	SH 130 Toll north	SH 130 exit 426/425
Williamson	Hutto	8.0	12.9	US 79 – Round Rock, Taylor	
1.000 mi = 1.609 km; 1.000 km = 0.621 mi

== FM 686 ==
Farm to Market Road 686
- Location: Liberty County
- Length: 11.943 mi (19.220 km)
- Existed: 1946–present

Farm to Market Road 686 (FM 686) runs from SH 321, north of Dayton, westward, southward, and eastward to FM 1960.

FM 686 was designated on May 15, 1946, to run from SH 321 west 4.8 miles (7.7 km) to Shipman Road in substitution for the original FM 161. On July 15, 1949, the road was extended south, west, and south to FM 1008 at Eastgate. On January 25, 1950, the termination point in Eastgate was corrected. On November 23, 1953, the road was extended east and south along the old route of FM 1008 to the new route of FM 1008 (which was rerouted to end in Huffman), completing its current route; FM 1960 replaced that section of FM 1008 on December 18, 1956.

== RM 687 ==
Ranch to Market Road 687
- Location: Hutchinson County
- Length: 18.506 mi (29.783 km)
- Existed: June 4, 1946 (Note: RM 687 was previously designated as FM 687 from 1945 to 1964.)–present

Ranch to Market Road 687 (RM 687) is located in Hutchinson County. Its southern terminus is at SH 136 east of Fritch. The route runs north to Sanford, where it begins a concurrency with RM 1319 northwestward into the Lake Meredith National Recreation Area. The two routes separate past an intersection with FM 3395, with RM 1319 continuing north and RM 687 turning to the east. Near the northeastern edge of the recreational area, a spur route, RM Spur 687, connects back to RM 1319. After exiting the recreational area, RM 687 travels northeast through unincorporated portions of the county to its northern terminus at SH 152 west of Stinnett.

RM 687 was designated as Farm to Market Road 687 (FM 687) on June 4, 1946, from SH 136 north 6.8 miles (10.9 km) to Sanford. On April 18, 1963, a portion of the route in Sanford was transferred to FM 1319 (now RM 1319) when that route was realigned in the town. On February 26, 1964, its designation was changed to RM 687, and it was extended to SH 152, replacing RM 2655. RM 1319 was extended northwestward from Sanford on March 29, 1967, establishing the present concurrency. The spur connection was added on May 7, 1970.

== FM 688 ==
Farm to Market Road 688
- Location: Kaufman County
- Length: 2.313 mi (3.722 km)
- Existed: January 18, 1960–present

Farm to Market Road 688 (FM 688) is located in Kaufman County. It runs through Forney along an old routing of US 80. It is known locally as Broad Street. The highway begins at an interchange with US 80 and ends at an intersection with FM 548.

FM 688 was designated on January 18, 1960, along its current route.

Junction list

The entire route is in Forney, Kaufman County.

mi	km	Destinations	Notes
0.0	0.0	US 80	Traffic must travel to FM 460 to access US 80
0.6	0.97	FM 740 north (Pinson Road) – Rockwall	West end of FM 740 overlap
0.9	1.4	FM 740 south (Bois d' Arc Street) – Seagoville	East end of FM 740 overlap
2.3	3.7	FM 548 – Royse City	
1.000 mi = 1.609 km; 1.000 km = 0.621 mi: Concurrency terminus

=== FM 688 (1946) ===
Farm to Market Road 688
- Location: Taylor County
- Existed: May 15, 1946–November 27, 1957

A previous route numbered FM 688 was designated on May 15, 1946, in Taylor County, from US 84 at Lawn to US 83 at Ovalo. On December 16, 1948, the section from Lawn to the Callahan County line was added. On July 11, 1951, the section from Lawn to the Callahan County line was transferred to FM 604; another 1.6-mile (2.6 km) section was transferred to FM 604 on February 20, 1952. On November 27, 1957, the remainder of FM 688 was cancelled and transferred to FM 382.

== FM 689 ==
Farm to Market Road 689
- Location: Floyd County
- Length: 16.208 mi (26.084 km)
- Existed: June 18, 1996–present

Farm to Market Road 689 (FM 689) runs from SH 207, north of FM 2286, eastward and northeastward to FM 1065, north of FM 97.

FM 689 was designated on June 18, 1996, on the current route.

=== FM 689 (1946) ===
Farm to Market Road 689
- Location: Kerr, Bandera, and Medina counties
- Existed: June 4, 1946–August 29, 1990

A previous route numbered FM 689 was designated on June 4, 1946, from PR 19 inside Kerrville State Park (now Kerrville-Schreiner Park; PR 19 was given to the city once it lost its state park status) south through Camp Verde to Bandera in substitution for RM 481. On April 27, 1948, the road was extended northward to SH 16, replacing a portion of PR 19. On October 28, 1953, the road was extended 18.8 miles (30.3 km) south of Bandera, creating a concurrency with SH 16. On December 15, 1954, the road was extended 8.3 miles (13.4 km) south to US 90 near Hondo. On February 1, 1972, FM 689 was signed, but not designated, as SH 173. On November 15, 1978, the section of FM 689 from SH 16 to PR 19 was transferred to Loop 534 (but still signed as SH 173). FM 689 was cancelled on August 29, 1990, as the extension of SH 173 over this road was officially designated.

== RM 690 ==
Ranch to Market Road 690 (RM 690) is located in Burnet County, along the east side of Lake Buchanan. It runs from SH 29, northeast of Inks Lake, northwestward and northeastward to Little Midland Rd.

Ranch to Market Road 690
- Location: Burnet County
- Length: 5.719 mi (9.204 km)
- Existed: June 1, 1965–present

RM 690 was designated on June 1, 1965, from SH 29 northwest 1.6 miles (2.6 km) to near the north end of Buchanan Dam. On August 29, 1972, the road was rerouted over RM 3236 to a road intersection, with the old route becoming a spur connection. On July 31, 1975, the road was extended northeast 2.0 miles (3.2 km) to Little Midland Road. On April 24, 2003, the spur connection was cancelled and given to Burnet County.

=== FM 690 (1946) ===
Farm to Market Road 690
- Location: Parmer and Castro counties
- Existed: May 29, 1945–November 21, 1957

A previous route numbered FM 690 was designated on May 29, 1945, from US 84, 2 miles (3.2 km) east of Farwell, east 6.9 miles (11.1 km) to Oklahoma Lane School. On December 16, 1948, the road was extended east 10.0 miles (16.1 km) via Midway School to a road intersection and the old route to Oklahoma Lane School became a spur of FM 690. On July 5, 1951, the spur to Oklahoma Lane School was cancelled and became a portion of FM 1731. On October 29, 1953, the road was extended 6.6 miles (10.6 km) to 1 mile (1.6 km) east of Lazbuddie. On April 24, 1954, the road was extended another 2.0 miles (3.2 km) east. On October 31, 1957, the road was extended east to SH 51. FM 690 was cancelled on November 21, 1957, and transferred to FM 145, although the US 84-FM 299 (note that FM 299 was signed as and later became part of SH 214) section remained signed as FM 690 until 1958.

== FM 691 ==
Farm to Market Road 691
- Location: Grayson County
- Length: 5.302 mi (8.533 km)
- Existed: 1946–present

Farm to Market Road 691 (FM 691) is located in Grayson County. The highway is known locally as Grayson Drive in the Sherman–Denison metropolitan area.

FM 691 begins at an intersection with Perimeter Road near North Texas Regional Airport in Sherman and intersects FM 1417 just east of here. The highway passes Grayson College before sharing an overlap with FM 131. FM 691 straddles the Sherman-Denison line and crosses US 75 before ending at an intersection with SH 91.

FM 691 was designated on April 16, 1946, from Camp Perrin to US 75 (now SH 91). It was previously War Highway 12. On June 27, 1995, the entire route was redesignated Urban Road 691 (UR 691). The designation reverted to FM 691 with the elimination of the Urban Road system on November 15, 2018.

Junction list

The entire route is in Grayson County.

Location	mi	km	Destinations	Notes
	0.0	0.0	Perimeter Road, Grayson Drive – North Texas Regional Airport	Western terminus; continues west as Grayson Drive
Sherman	0.5	0.80	FM 1417 – Sherman, Pottsboro	Continues west as Grayson Drive
	2.1	3.4	FM 131 south – Sherman	West end of FM 131 overlap
	3.3	5.3	FM 131 north	East end of FM 131 overlap
Sherman–Denison line	4.1	6.6	US 75 – Durant, Dallas	US 75 exit 65
Denison	5.3	8.5	SH 91 – Denison, Sherman	Eastern terminus
1.000 mi = 1.609 km; 1.000 km = 0.621 mi: Concurrency terminus

== FM 692 ==
Farm to Market Road 692
- Location: Newton County
- Length: 15.063 mi (24.242 km)
- Existed: May 23, 1951–present

Farm to Market Road 692 (FM 692) is located in Newton County. The route runs 15 miles (24 km) from SH 63 near Burkeville north to Louisiana Highway 191 at the Louisiana state line north of South Toledo Bend.

FM 692 begins at a junction with SH 63 in Burkeville. From here, the highway heads north a rural area. The route then turns to the northeast, following a twisting route through farmland. After turning north again, the road crosses three creeks and passes Gunter Cemetery. The highway then reaches a junction with Recreational Road 255 in South Toledo Bend. After passing Spur 135 north of that junction, FM 692 crosses a channel connecting the Toledo Bend Reservoir to the Sabine River and heads north alongside the Toledo Bend Dam. FM 692 ends at the Louisiana state line while along the dam; the road continues into Louisiana as Highway 191.

On May 23, 1951, FM 692 was designated along part of its current route, 2.8 miles (4.5 km) from SH 63 northward. The highway was extended 2.8 more miles on November 20, 1951.

On September 27, 1960, FM 692 was extended north 6.6 miles (10.6 km). On September 20, 1961, FM 692 was extended north 1.4 miles (2.3 km). On May 6, 1964, it was extended north 0.8 miles (1.3 km). On August 26, 1969, FM 692 was extended 0.5 miles (0.80 km) to the Louisiana state line.

Major intersections

The entire route is in Newton County.

Location	mi	km	Destinations	Notes
	0.0	0.0	SH 63 – Jasper, Leesville	
South Toledo Bend	13.6	21.9	RE 255 west	
	15.0	24.1	LA 191 north	Northern terminus at Louisiana state line
1.000 mi = 1.609 km; 1.000 km = 0.621 mi

=== FM 692 (1946) ===
Farm to Market Road 692
- Location: Nueces County
- Existed: June 4, 1946–September 5, 1946

A previous route numbered FM 692 was designated on June 4, 1946, from FM 665 southwest of Corpus Christi southeast 9.3 miles (15.0 km), then northeast to FM 693 (now SH 358). FM 692 was cancelled three months later, and its mileage was transferred to SH 357.

== RM 693 ==
Ranch to Market Road 693
- Location: Kinney County
- Length: 18.571 mi (29.887 km)
- Existed: May 23, 1951 (Note: RM 693 was previously designated as FM 693 from 1951 to 1959.)–present

Ranch to Market Road 693 (RM 693) is a 18.5 mi (29.8 km) route in southwest Kinney County. The southern terminus is at US 277. RM 693 travels northeast through unincorporated Kinney County before ending at a junction with US 90 west of Brackettville.

RM 693 was designated on May 23, 1951, as Farm to Market Road 693 (FM 693), from US 90 southwestward 7.6 miles (12.2 km). On November 20, 1951, the road was extended to US 277. FM 693 was changed to RM 693 on October 17, 1959.

=== FM 693 (1946) ===
Farm to Market Road 693
- Location: Nueces County
- Existed: June 4, 1946–September 5, 1946

FM 693 was originally designated on June 4, 1946, from SH 286 south of Corpus Christi southeast to Naval Air Station Corpus Christi. This route was renumbered SH 358 on September 5, 1946.

== FM 694 ==
Farm to Market Road 694
- Location: Hartley County
- Length: 12.599 mi (20.276 km)
- Existed: 1946–present

Farm to Market Road 694 (FM 694) runs from US 54, southwest of Dalhart, westward, northward, and eastward to US 54, southwest of Dalhart.

FM 694 was designated on June 6, 1946 (agreed July 8), to run from US 54 west and north 5.184 miles (8.343 km). On May 2, 1962, the road was extended north and east back to US 54, completing its current route.

== FM 695 ==
Farm to Market Road 695
- Location: Dallam County
- Length: 3.324 mi (5.349 km)
- Existed: 1946–present

Farm to Market Road 695 (FM 695) runs from US 54, northeast of Dalhart, eastward and southward a distance of approximately 3.324 miles (5.349 km).

FM 695 was designated on June 6, 1946 (agreed July 8), on the current route.

== FM 696 ==
Farm to Market Road 696
- Location: Bastrop, Lee, and Burleson counties
- Length: 35.485 mi (57.108 km)
- Existed: July 31, 1946–present

Farm to Market Road 696 (FM 696) is located in Bastrop, Lee and Burleson counties.

FM 696 was designated on July 31, 1946, from SH 20 (now US 290) northeast 1.1 miles (1.8 km) to Butler. On November 23, 1948, it was extended northeast to the Bastrop–Lee county line, and another section from Blue in Lee County east to FM 112 was added, creating a gap. On July 14, 1949, FM 696 was extended from the Bastrop–Lee county line to Blue, closing the gap. On September 27, 1960, it was extended east to a road intersection 6.0 miles (9.7 km) east of US 77, replacing a section of FM 112. On June 11, 1965, FM 696 was extended southeast to SH 21, replacing FM 1574.

== FM 697 ==
Farm to Market Road 697
- Location: Grayson County
- Length: 14.794 mi (23.809 km)
- Existed: 1946–present

Farm to Market Road 697 (FM 697) runs from SH 11 near Sherman, southeastward to US 69 near Whitewright.

FM 697 was designated on July 31, 1946 (agreed on August 9), to run from US 82 near Sherman to US 69. On December 17, 1970, the section from US 82 to then-FM 1281 (along with FM 1281 itself) became part of SH 11 when it was rerouted due to the extension of SH 50.

== FM 698 ==
Farm to Market Road 698
- Location: Nacogdoches County
- Length: 6.682 mi (10.754 km)
- Existed: September 13, 1946–present

Farm to Market Road 698 (FM 698) runs from US 259, north of US 59, westward and northwestward via Rock Springs Church.

FM 698 was designated on September 13, 1946, to run from SH 26 (now US 259) to Rock Springs Church. On May 6, 1964, the road was extended northwest 3.2 miles (5.1 km) to its current end.

== FM 699 ==
Farm to Market Road 699
- Location: Panola and Shelby counties
- Length: 30.169 mi (48.552 km)
- Existed: September 13, 1946–present

Farm to Market Road 699 (FM 699) is located in Panola and Shelby counties. It runs from SH 7/SH 87 in Center to Bus. US 79 in Carthage.

FM 699 was designated on September 13, 1946, from Center to Jericho School. FM 699 was extended north 2.1 miles (3.4 km) on May 5, 1966, north to US 84 at Paxton on September 9, 1966 (replacing FM 416; connecting section designated August 31) and north to US 79 in Carthage on November 3, 1970 (replacing FM 1401, signage effective January 1, 1971). On June 18, 1996, FM 699 was rerouted due to expansion of Center Municipal Airport; a 0.58-mile (0.93 km) section became FM Spur 699, another section became an extension of FM 1656 and a 1.62-mile (2.61 km) section was removed altogether.

Junction list

County	Location	mi	km	Destinations	Notes
Shelby	Center			SH 7 / SH 87	Traffic circle around Shelby County Courthouse
Shelby	Center			FM 2468 north (Portacool Way)	
Shelby				Loop 500	
Shelby				FM Spur 699	
Shelby				FM 1656 south	
Shelby				US 84	Future I-69; current at-grade intersection
Panola				FM 2517	
Panola	Carthage			US 59 (LaSalle Parkway)	Future I-369; current at-grade intersection
Panola	Carthage			Bus. US 79 (East Sabine Street) – Business District	
1.000 mi = 1.609 km; 1.000 km = 0.621 mi
