= Texas State Highway 358 =

Highway in Texas

State Highway 358
- Padre Island Drive
- SH 358, highlighted in red

Route information
- Maintained by TxDOT
- Length: 16.864 mi (27.140 km)
- Existed: 1946–present

Major junctions
- West end: I-37 in Corpus Christi
- SH 44 in Corpus Christi; SH 286 in Corpus Christi
- East end: Corpus Christi Naval Air Station

Location
- Country: United States
- State: Texas

Highway system
- Highways in Texas; Interstate; US; State; Former; Toll; Loops; Spurs; FM/RM; Park; Rec
← SH 357	→ SH 359

State Highway 358 (SH 358) is a Texas state highway that runs along the southern edge of Corpus Christi. The access road for the freeway section of SH 358 is signed as Padre Island Drive.

== History ==
The section of the highway from SH 286 east to Corpus Christi Naval Air Station was originally designated as FM 693 on June 4, 1946. On September 5, 1946, it was redesignated to SH 358. The section from SH 286 northward to Spur 407 (SH 9 at the time) was originally designated as Farm to Market Road 891 on November 23, 1948 and was combined with the current route on April 24, 1958, and SH 358 was extended north to I-37 also.

== Route description ==
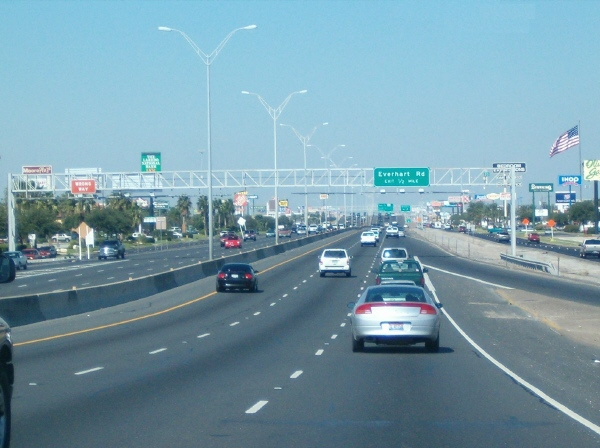
SH 358 Westbound between Staples and Everhart

SH 358 is located in Corpus Christi in Nueces County and begins at I-37 near Nueces Bay and ends at the Corpus Christi Naval Air Station on the south side of Corpus Christi Bay. SH 358 is a freeway that follows Padre Island Drive and provides access to Padre and Mustang Islands by way of Park Road 22 (PR 22).

The freeway begins at an interchange with I-37 west of the bayfront area of Corpus Christi. It heads south from the interchange to an interchange with SH 44 which provides access to Corpus Christi International Airport. It continues to the south and begins to turn to the southeast just prior to a junction with FM 665 (Old Brownsville Road). The highway continues to the southeast to an interchange with SH 286 (Crosstown Expressway). The freeway continues to the southeast through the city to a junction with SH 357 (Rodd Field Road) just prior to Oso Bay. After crossing the bridge over Oso Bay, the freeway heads southeast to an interchange with PR 22. PR 22 continues to the southeast over the John F. Kennedy Memorial Causeway to Padre Island as SH 358 curves to the northeast to its eastern terminus at the Corpus Christi Naval Station.

== Exit list ==
The entire highway is in Corpus Christi, Nueces County.

All exits are unnumbered.

mi	km	Destinations	Notes
0.0	0.0	I-37 – San Antonio, Bayfront / Shoreline Boulevard	I-37 exit 4A; western terminus
0.1	0.16	Leopard Street	
0.7	1.1	Agnes Street	
1.1	1.8	SH 44 west – Robstown, Alice, Airport	
1.8	2.9	Bates Drive	Westbound exit signed at Bear Lane exit
2.3	3.7	Bear Lane	
3.1	5.0	FM 665 (Old Brownsville Road)	
3.5	5.6	West Point Road	
4.5	7.2	Greenwood Drive	
5.2	8.4	SH 286 (Crosstown Expressway)	
5.4	8.7	Ayers Street ( Bus. SH 286)	No westbound entrance
6.5	10.5	Kostoryz Road / Carroll Lane	
7.6	12.2	FM 43 (Weber Road) / Carroll Lane	
8.5	13.7	Everhart Road	
9.6	15.4	Staples Street	
9.9	15.9	Airline Road	
11.1	17.9	Nile Road	Westbound exit signed at SH 357 exit
11.6	18.7	SH 357 / Rodd Field Road	Access to Bay Area Medical Center
12.3	19.8	Spur 3 (Ennis Joslin Road) – Texas A&M University-Corpus Christi	
13.5	21.7	Paul Jones Avenue	Eastbound exit signed at Spur 3 exit
14.1	22.7	Oso Bay Turnaround	Westbound exit and eastbound entrance
14.7	23.7	Four Bluff Drive	
15.1	24.3	Frontage Road	Eastbound exit and westbound entrance
15.4	24.8	PR 22 – Padre Island, Port Aransas	East end of freeway; eastbound exit and westbound entrance
16.8	27.0	Corpus Christi NAS	Eastern terminus
1.000 mi = 1.609 km; 1.000 km = 0.621 mi: Incomplete access
