= Texas State Highway 286 =

Texas highway south of Corpus Christi

State Highway 286
- SH 286 highlighted in red

Route information
- Maintained by TxDOT
- Length: 15.209 mi (24.477 km)
- Existed: 1939–present

Major junctions
- South end: FM 70 at Chapman Ranch
- SH 358 at Corpus Christi
- North end: I-37 / US 181 / SH 35 at Corpus Christi

Location
- Country: United States
- State: Texas

Highway system
- Highways in Texas; Interstate; US; State; Former; Toll; Loops; Spurs; FM/RM; Park; Rec
← SH 285	→ US 287

State Highway 286 (SH 286) is a Texas state highway running from downtown Corpus Christi south to Chapman Ranch. The route was designated on its current route in 1939. Before 1939, this route was known as SH 96, and was proposed to be extended to the southwest to Riviera. It is also locally known as the "Crosstown Expressway."

== History ==
The route from Corpus Christi to Chapman Ranch was originally designated as a portion of SH 96 as early as 1933. The highway was redesignated to SH 286 on September 26, 1939.

Throughout much of 2017, construction was done to expand the freeway south to FM 43. The work was completed by the end of the year.

== Route description ==
The route of SH 286 runs from FM 70 northward to I-37 in Corpus Christi in Nueces County. The southern terminus is located in rural Nueces County at FM 70 south of Corpus Christi. The highway heads north with intersections at FM 2444 and FM 43 before turning to the northeast and crossing Oso Creek near Cabaniss Field Naval Air Station. SH 286 becomes a freeway south of SH 357 (Saratoga Boulevard). The freeway portion of the highway is known as the Crosstown Expressway. As the freeway heads to the northeast, it has an interchange with SH 358 (South Padre Island Drive). SH 286 continues north from SH 358 through downtown Corpus Christi before terminating at I-37. The freeway continues north of I-37 as US 181/SH 35 over the Harbor Bridge Project to Portland.

== Junction list ==
The entire route is in Nueces County. All exits are unnumbered.

Location	mi	km	Destinations	Notes
Chapman Ranch	0.0	0.0	FM 70 north to US 77	
	4.5	7.2	FM 2444 (Staples Street)	Interchange under construction, future southern end of freeway
	5.5	8.9	CR 20A / Prairie Road	Interchange under construction; northbound exit and southbound entrance
	6.0	9.7	CR 22	Interchange under construction
	7.0	11.3	FM 43 (Weber Road)	South end of freeway
Corpus Christi	7.4	11.9	Bus. SH 286	
Corpus Christi	7.8	12.6	SH 357 (Saratoga Boulevard)	
Corpus Christi	9.1	14.6	Holly Road	
Corpus Christi	10.3	16.6	SH 358 – Padre Island, NAS-CCAD	Access to Corpus Christi International Airport
Corpus Christi	11.3	18.2	Gollihar Road	
Corpus Christi	11.7	18.8	Horne Road	
Corpus Christi	12.3	19.8	Port Avenue / Tarlton Street	
Corpus Christi	13.1	21.1	Baldwin Boulevard	
Corpus Christi	13.4	21.6	Morgan Avenue / 19th Street	Access to Spohn Memorial Hospital
Corpus Christi	14.2	22.9	Laredo Street / Agnes Street	
Corpus Christi	14.7	23.7	Lipan Street / Comanche Street	Northbound exit and southbound entrance
Corpus Christi	15.2	24.5	I-37 north – San Antonio, Int'l Airport; Downtown / SEA District / Staples Street	Exit 1C on I-37
Corpus Christi	15.3	24.6	US 181 north / SH 35 north – Portland	Northern terminus
1.000 mi = 1.609 km; 1.000 km = 0.621 mi: Incomplete access; Proposed
