= Texas State Highway 361 =

State highway in Texas

State Highway 361
- SH 361; highlighted in red, ferry crossing in blue

Route information
- Maintained by TxDOT
- Length: 35.293 mi (56.799 km)
- Existed: 1956–present

Major junctions
- South end: PR 22 on Padre Island
- North end: SH 35 / Spur 202 at Gregory

Location
- Country: United States
- State: Texas

Highway system
- Highways in Texas; Interstate; US; State; Former; Toll; Loops; Spurs; FM/RM; Park; Rec
| ← SH 360 | → SH 362 |

State Highway 361 (SH 361) is a state highway in San Patricio and Nueces counties that runs from Gregory in southern Texas, near Corpus Christi, east and south to Padre Island on the Gulf of Mexico coast.

== History ==
The highway was first designated on April 4, 1956 as the six-mile (9.7 km) portion of the route from Aransas Pass to Port Aransas, and a 0.7 mile extension in Port Aransas to PR 53 was added to the designation on November 28, 1967. On January 31, 1969 FM 632 from Gregory to Aransas Pass was added to the SH 361 designation. The present route was completed on November 29, 1988 with the designation of PR 53 from Port Aransas to PR 22 on Padre Island as part of SH 361.

== Route description ==
The highway begins on Padre Island, at a junction with Park Road 22 near the Padre Isles Country Club in Nueces County. It then crosses the Corpus Christi Pass onto Mustang Island and runs along the length of the island to Port Aransas. Much of the route crosses Mustang Island State Park, a 3,954-acre (16.00 km^{2}) tourist and recreational area established by the state in 1979.

There is no bridge for the route over the Corpus Christi Channel between Port Aransas and Harbor Island; a ferry operates at this point. From here the route crosses several bridges as it runs in a northwesterly direction through Harbor Island and Stedman Island before it enters the Texas mainland in Aransas Pass. The highway is known as Port Aransas Causeway and Cemetery Road for this part of the route. The highway continues southwest from Aransas Pass, then turns northwest through Ingleside, where it intersects Farm to Market Road 1069. The highway's northern terminus is the intersection with SH 35 and Spur 202 at Gregory in San Patricio County.

The road is paved throughout, except for the ferry at Port Aransas, and is often multi-lane. Much of the highway traverses the picturesque terrain of the Texas barrier islands along the Gulf of Mexico.

== Junction list ==
| County | Location | mi | km | Destinations | Notes |
|---|---|---|---|---|---|
| Nueces | Corpus Christi | 0.0 | 0.0 | PR 22 | |
| Nueces | Port Aransas | 19.1– 19.4 | 30.7– 31.2 | Aransas Pass–Port Aransas Ferry | |
| Nueces–San Patricio county line | Port Aransas–Aransas Pass line | | | Redfish Bay Causeway | |
| San Patricio | Aransas Pass | 25.8 | 41.5 | Loop 90 (Commercial Street, Goodnight Avenue) – Rockport | |
| San Patricio | Aransas Pass | 27.7 | 44.6 | FM 2725 | |
| San Patricio | Ingleside | 30.8 | 49.6 | FM 1069 (Main Street) | |
| San Patricio | Gregory | 35.3 | 56.8 | SH 35 / Spur 202 west – Corpus Christi, Sinton, Gregory | Interchange |
1.000 mi = 1.609 km; 1.000 km = 0.621 mi
