= Texas State Highway 357 =

State highway in Texas

State Highway 357
- SH 357, highlighted in red

Route information
- Maintained by TxDOT
- Length: 11.049 mi (17.782 km)
- Existed: 1946–present

Major junctions
- West end: FM 665 in Corpus Christi
- SH 286 in Corpus Christi
- East end: SH 358 in Corpus Christi

Location
- Country: United States
- State: Texas

Highway system
- Highways in Texas; Interstate; US; State; Former; Toll; Loops; Spurs; FM/RM; Park; Rec
← SH 356	→ SH 358

State Highway 357 (SH 357) is a Texas state highway that runs along the southwestern end of Corpus Christi. The route was originally designated as FM 692 on June 4, 1946. On September 5, 1946, it was redesignated to SH 357.

== Route description ==
SH 357 begins in southwestern Corpus Christi at FM 665 and heads towards the southeast along Saratoga Boulevard. As it heads to the southeast, it passes under SH 286 (Crosstown Expressway) at a diamond interchange. As it heads southeast from the interchange, the highway intersects FM 43 (Weber Road) and FM 2444 (Staples Street). Saratoga Boulevard comes to an end at an intersection with Rodd Field Road. SH 357 follows Rodd Field Road from this intersection to the northeast to its eastern terminus at SH 358 (South Padre Island Drive).

== Junction list ==
The entire route is in Corpus Christi, Nueces County.

mi	km	Destinations	Notes
		FM 665 (Old Brownsville Road)	
		SH 286 (Crosstown Expressway)	Interchange
		Bus. SH 286 (Ayers Street)	
		FM 43 (Weber Road)	
		FM 2444 (Staples Street)	
		SH 358 (South Padre Island Drive)	Interchange
1.000 mi = 1.609 km; 1.000 km = 0.621 mi
