= Elgin-Butler Brick Company =

The Elgin-Butler Brick Company manufactures structural ceramic glazed masonry products at a plant northeast of Austin, Texas, United States. The company has regional market dominance in structural brick and other ceramic products.

== History ==
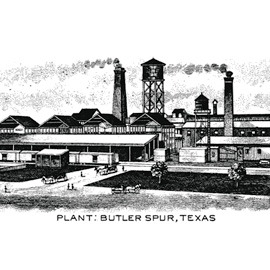
Plant at Butler Spur, Texas

Originally called Butler Brick Company, the firm was founded in 1873 on the south shore of the Colorado River in Austin, Texas the current site of Butler Shores. Irish immigrant bricklayer Michael Butler while cutting trees in Butler, Texas discovered excellent clay pits on Farm to Market 696 shortly after the Texas and New Orleans Railroad arrived there in 1871. The community that grew up around it came to be known as Butler, Texas a company town with a company store and brick houses for employees who farmed on the side.

The town's population reached about 150 and the company also mined clay from a site now in the [Butler Shores] on the east side of Barton Creek next to the now Zilker Park soccer fields in Austin. On the Butler Shores Brick Plant location clay was transported in buckets hung from mule-drawn lines to kilns on the north bank of the Colorado River, site of the present-day Austin High School. Another plant was located farther down the Colorado River at the site of the Zachary Scott Theatre. In 1912 the firm acquired the Austin Brick Company, and in 1965 it acquired its chief competitor, Elgin Standard Brick Company. The Elgin Butler company supplied bricks for the Texas State Capitol, 80 percent of the brick structures at the University of Texas at Austin, face brick and fire brick for fireplaces in many Austin residences, and many other brick buildings in Austin. Brick from Elgin Butler Brick Company was also used for the façade of the United States Embassy in Mexico City. The company maintained offices in Austin and Elgin from approximately 1910, and was family-owned and operated until 2005 when it was sold to Matt Galvez from New York.

== Sale of Company by the Butler Family ==
In December 2005, the Butler family sold the company to Matthew Galvez (an 81% shareholder) and James Nichols (a 19% shareholder) in a transaction financed by Frost Bank with a Small Business Administration guarantee on a portion of the acquisition financing. Around the time of the transfer, the primary products manufactured and sold by Elgin-Butler were glazed brick and large structural clay tile for use in school construction, transportation terminals such as subway stations and airports, stadiums, food processing plants, jails, multi-unit housing, restaurants, and other commercial uses. Elgin-Butler also made fire brick, fireplace liners and solar screen tile at its plant in Elgin, Texas. Following the sale of the company, Elgin-Butler's introduced thin glazed brick as well as its subsidiaries, McIntyre Tile Company, Inc. and Trikeenan Tile Works, manufactured glazed thin brick, and art tile at their respective plants in Healdsburg, California and Hornell, New York. McIntyre and Trikeenan's glazed thin brick and art tile were almost exclusively used in commercial applications.
