= Butler, Bastrop County, Texas =

- Unincorporated community
- Location within Texas Location within the United States
- Coordinates: 30°19′15″N 97°17′48″W
- Country: United States
- State: Texas
- County: Bastrop
- Elevation: 469 ft (143 m)
- Time zone: UTC-6 (Central (CST))
  - Summer (DST): UTC-5 (CDT)
- Area codes: 512 & 737
- GNIS feature ID: 1331743

Butler is an unincorporated community in Bastrop County, Texas, United States. It is located within the Greater Austin metropolitan area.

== History ==
The town was established in 1871 with the coming of the Texas and New Orleans Railroad. It was named after Michael Butler, an Irish immigrant bricklayer who founded a brick works on a railway spur.

The small community never expanded sufficiently to establish a post office. Population figures were not reported until the 1930s when there were 107 residents. This number reached 150 by the late 1940s and remained at this level for the next 20 years. In the mid-1980s, the settlement was still listed as a community. Butler still appears on county highway maps.

== Elgin-Butler Brick Company ==
Michael Butler founded Elgin-Butler Brick Company in 1873. He had accidentally discovered suitable brickmaking clay while digging holes on land bought for timber. The firm's central operations were located at a 1,000-acre site in Butler; sales headquarters were based in Austin. Butler gradually became a company town with a company store and brick homes for the workers, who farmed on the side.

In 1990, the brickworks was automated so that the clay was mixed with water and extruded into molds before firing. During the 1990s, Elgin-Butler employed 411 workers. The firm gained a reputation for innovative brick designs with widespread appeal. Michael Butler was succeeded by members of his family, including a son who studied ceramic engineering at Ohio State University. Today, Elgin-Butler Brick produces firebrick and specialty structural glazed tiles. After being passed through five generations of Butlers, the family sold the company in 2005.

== Geography ==
Butler is located five miles southeast of Elgin, 20 miles north of the town of Bastrop and 31 miles east of Austin near the intersection of Farm to Market Road 696 and Farm to Market Road 106 (Old McDade Road), near Texas State Highway 290. It is also located 6 mi (9.7 km) west of McDade.

== Education ==
Butler is served by the Bastrop Independent School District.
