= Texas Park Road 22 =

Road in Texas, United States

PR 22
- PR 22 highlighted in red

Route information
- Maintained by TxDOT
- Length: 15.590 mi (25.090 km)
- Existed: July 1, 1940–present

Major junctions
- South end: Northern boundary of Padre Island National Seashore
- North end: SH 358 in Flour Bluff, Corpus Christi

Location
- Country: United States
- State: Texas
- Counties: Nueces, Kleberg

Highway system
- Highways in Texas; Interstate; US; State; Former; Toll; Loops; Spurs; FM/RM; Park; Rec
← PR 21	→ PR 23

Texas Park Road 22 (PR 22) is a major Park Road located in Nueces and Kleberg counties along the Gulf Coast region of the U.S. state of Texas. The highway is approximately 15.6 miles (25.1 km) in length, and is located mainly in the city of Corpus Christi, with a large portion of the roadway traveling along Padre Island. Most of the highway's length within Corpus Christi is built up to freeway standards.

In 2021, a bridge was added along the northbound lanes as part of a construction project lasting over a year, although some residents were concerned that a boat would not be able to pass along the waterway underneath it.

== Exit list ==
All exits are unnumbered.

County	Location	mi	km	Destinations	Notes
Kleberg		0.000	0.000	Northern boundary of Padre Island National Seashore	Southern terminus
Nueces	Corpus Christi	6.892	11.092	Southern end of divided highway	
Nueces	Corpus Christi	9.662	15.549	SH 361 north – Port Aransas	Southern terminus of SH 361
Nueces	Corpus Christi	10.534– 10.547	16.953– 16.974	Aquarius Street	Southernmost at-grade intersection along PR 22
Nueces	Corpus Christi	10.704	17.226	Southern end of freeway	
Nueces	Corpus Christi	10.895	17.534	John F. Kennedy Memorial Causeway	
Nueces	Corpus Christi	11.077	17.827	Intracoastal Turnaround	Access to South Padre Island Drive
Nueces	Corpus Christi	11.734– 11.762	18.884– 18.929	Intracoastal Turnaround	Access to boat-launch ramp
Nueces	Corpus Christi	11.884	19.125	Frontage Road	Southbound entrance only
Nueces	Corpus Christi	13.091– 13.613	21.068– 21.908	Laguna Madre Access	Southbound exit and entrance
Nueces	Corpus Christi	14.198	22.849	Waldron Road/NAS–CCAD	Northbound exit and southbound entrance
Nueces	Corpus Christi	15.248	24.539	Waldron Road/Laguna Shores Road; Flour Bluff Drive	No southbound or northbound entrance
Nueces	Corpus Christi	15.590	25.090	SH 358 west	Northern terminus; southbound exit and northbound entrance; freeway continues as SH 358
1.000 mi = 1.609 km; 1.000 km = 0.621 mi: Incomplete access
