= John F. Kennedy Memorial Causeway =

- Coordinates: 27°39′29″N 97°15′41″W
- Carries: Motor vehicular traffic traveling on Texas Park Road 22
- Crosses: Laguna Madre
- Locale: Corpus Christi, Texas
- Official name: John F. Kennedy Memorial Causeway
- Named for: John F. Kennedy
- Owner: Texas Department of Transportation
- Maintained by: Texas Department of Transportation

Characteristics
- Design: Box girder bridge
- Material: Post-tensioned concrete

History
- Constructed by: First bridge: Bauer-Smith Dredging Company
- Construction start: First bridge: February 1949; Second bridge: circa 1970
- Construction cost: First bridge: $1.7 million Second bridge: $2.5 million
- Opened: First bridge: 17 June 1950; Second bridge: 28 June 1973
- Replaces: Don Patricio Causeway

Statistics
- Toll: None

The John F. Kennedy Memorial Causeway is a paved highway located in Corpus Christi, Texas. The causeway crosses the Laguna Madre and connects North Padre Island with Flour Bluff on the Texas mainland.

== History ==
Proposals for a causeway date back to the 1920s, when the Gulf Coast Causeway Company, chartered on 8 October 1925, proposed to build toll roads connecting Corpus Christi to Brownsville via Padre Island as part of a two-year, $1.5 million investment pledge for private development on the island. Later, Cameron County sheriff Colonel Sam A. Robertson, who had previously chartered the Brazos de Santiago Pass Ferry Company that provided ferry access to the island, used his private capital to build the Don Patricio Causeway in 1927. This causeway, named after the previous owner of the island Patrick Dunn, consisted of four parallel wooden troughs on trestles, spaced apart so that the standard automobiles of the time could drive across by placing its tires in them. The causeway opened on 4 July 1927 and was destroyed on 5 September by the 1933 Cuba–Brownsville hurricane; it was not rebuilt.

=== First bridge ===
Port Lavaca-based Bauer-Smith Dredging Company started construction on the first bridge in February 1949; the project was funded by $1.7 million in public bonds. The 4.5 mile long raised roadway structure opened on 17 June 1950 as a toll road and was originally called the North Padre Island Causeway; on 26 November 1963, Nueces County officials renamed it after President Kennedy following his assassination in Dallas four days prior. The tolls were removed on 31 October 1967; Nueces County turned over ownership of the bridge to the Texas State Department of Highways and Public Transportation on 1 January 1968.

=== Current bridge ===
As bridge traffic increased, the need to replace the swing bridges over the Intracoastal Waterway along the causeway increased as well. Dredging began in 1970, and the $2.5 million bridge, which was constructed with precast segments transported in from offsite that were joined together with epoxy resin, was finished and was formally dedicated on 28 June 1973. The new bridge was the first post-tensioned concrete segmental box girder bridge built in the United States.

== See also ==
- List of memorials to John F. Kennedy
