= Chapman Ranch, Texas =

Unincorporated community in Texas, US

Coordinates: 27°35′11″N 97°27′12″W

Chapman Ranch is an unincorporated community in southeastern Nueces County, Texas, United States, 7 mi (11 km) south of Corpus Christi. It is named for a family who purchased 34,000 acres (13,800 ha) of the King Ranch in 1919.
