= Bluntzer, Texas =

Unincorporated community in Texas, United States

Coordinates: 27°53′50″N 97°46′59″W

Bluntzer (Texas) is an unincorporated community located in Nueces County, Texas in the Corpus Christi Metropolitan Statistical Area. The elevation is 75 feet. Bluntzer appears on the San Patricio U.S. Geological Survey Map.

== History ==
Bluntzer was a stop on the San Antonio-Brownsville stage line. It was known as Santa Margarita Crossing before Nicholas Bluntzer moved into the area about 1860. The local school was opened in the 1870s but, during the 1919 Atlantic hurricane season, flooding led to its relocation. Justina Bluntzer, daughter of Nicholas, donated the land for the school. The school held classes until it was consolidated with the Banquete Independent School District in 1971.

== Bluntzer Family ==
Bluntzer Texas is an area of Texas - neither declared town nor county, that is named after the Bluntzer family. Currently, the children of Eric Bluntzer make the 7th generation of Bluntzers still living there, and the family has been in the area since 1860. Most of the inhabitants of the Bluntzer area, including the Bluntzer family itself, are or have been heavily involved in farming and ranching. On an average day, Bluntzer dwellers are running and fixing tractors, building houses, doing brush management, hunting, fishing in the lakes and gravel pits around the area, and doing all the things associated with running farms and ranches.
