= Don Gillis (American football) =

American football player (1935–2019)

No. 50
- Position: Center

Personal information
- Born: March 31, 1935; Corpus Christi, Texas, U.S.
- Died: July 25, 2019 (aged 84); Houston, Texas, U.S.
- Listed height: 6 ft 3 in (1.91 m)
- Listed weight: 245 lb (111 kg)

Career information
- High school: West Oso (Corpus Christi)
- College: Rice
- NFL draft: 1957: 8th round, 89th overall pick

Career history
- Cleveland Browns (1958)*; Chicago/St. Louis Cardinals (1958–1961)
- * Offseason or practice squad member only
- Stats at Pro Football Reference

William Donald Gillis (March 31, 1935 – July 25, 2019) was an American professional football center who played for the Chicago/St. Louis Cardinals of the National Football League (NFL). He played college football for the Rice Owls and was selected by the Cleveland Browns in the eighth round of the 1957 NFL draft.

== Early life ==
William Donald Gillis was born on March 31, 1935, in Corpus Christi, Texas. He played high school football at West Oso High School in Corpus Christi and graduated in 1953.

== College career ==
Gillis first played college football at Del Mar College from 1953 to 1954 as a center. He was named a first-team junior college All-American in 1953 and a first-team All-Longhorn Conference selection in 1954.

In 1955, Gillis transferred to Rice Institute to play for the Owls. He was a varsity letterman in 1955 and 1957. He was ineligible for the 1956 season due to academic issues.

== Professional career ==
Gillis was selected by the Cleveland Browns in the eighth round, with the 89th overall pick, of the 1957 NFL draft. He signed with the Browns for the 1958 season. On August 21, 1958, Gillis was waived by the Browns after he left the team to sign with the Montreal Alouettes of the Canadian Football League (CFL). However, he was claimed off waivers by the Chicago Cardinals, cancelling his CFL deal. Gillis played in 45 games, starting 44, out of a possible 48 for the Cardinals from 1958 to 1961. He was released on August 28, 1962, in favor of Bob DeMarco.

== Personal life ==
After his NFL career, Gillis was a salesman with the McMurray Oil Company. While in Singapore, he helped create the Singapore American Youth Football League and was the league's first commissioner from 1974 to 1975. Gillis returned to the United States in 1977 and worked at the Galveston-Houston Company until retiring in 1990.

Gillis was diagnosed with frontal lobe dementia in 2009. He died on July 25, 2019, in Houston, Texas.
