= Tommy Blake =

American football player (born 1985)

Profile
- Position: Defensive end

Personal information
- Born: January 15, 1985 (age 41); Aransas Pass, Texas, U.S.
- Listed height: 6 ft 5 in (1.96 m)
- Listed weight: 252 lb (114 kg)

Career information
- High school: Aransas Pass (TX)
- College: TCU
- NFL draft: 2008: undrafted

Awards and highlights
- 2× First-team All-MW (2005, 2006)

Tommy Earl Blake Jr. (born January 15, 1985) is an American former football defensive end who played college football at Texas Christian University.

== Early life ==
Blake was born in Aransas, Texas. He was raised by his maternal grandmother, Ernestine Chisholm, as his mother died of pneumonia when he was ten months old. Blake became a devout Baptist.

Blake was an athlete at Aransas Pass High School. He earned twelve total varsity letters (four in basketball, four in track, three in football and one in baseball). He played running back for the Panthers. As a senior he ran for 2,101 yards and had 25 touchdowns. This performance earned him All-South Texas Offensive MVP honors from the Corpus Christi Caller-Times.

Blake played on Aransas Pass High School's championship basketball teams, playing all four years on the varsity team, and advancing to the UIL Texas State Playoffs all four years. The Panthers basketball team advanced to the class AAA Boy's Final Four his junior and senior years with Blake at the center position. Blake was named first-team All State in basketball his senior year.

He was offered football scholarships at Colorado, Arkansas, and Vanderbilt, but elected to stay closer to home to play at TCU in Fort Worth.

== College career ==
While redshirting as a freshman in 2003, Blake was moved by TCU coach Gary Patterson from tailback to defensive end because of his mix of size and speed. As a redshirt freshman in 2004, Blake earned Conference USA All-Freshman honors with five sacks, the most for a TCU freshman since Aaron Schobel in 1997. In 2005, TCU moved to the Mountain West Conference, and Blake earned first-team All-MWC honors with seven sacks and 13.5 tackles for loss. College Football News named Blake their Mountain West Defensive Player of the Year.

Before his junior season in 2006, Blake was named a preseason All-American by The Sporting News. He also appeared on the watch lists for the Bronko Nagurski Trophy, the Chuck Bednarik Award, the Lombardi Award, the Ted Hendricks Award, and the Lott Trophy.

During his junior season, Blake led the Horned Frogs with 54 tackles, 16 1/2 tackles for loss and seven sacks. He also returned a fumble for a touchdown against UNLV. He was again named first-team All-MWC, this time as a unanimous choice. On December 19, Blake and his TCU team took on Northern Illinois in the Poinsettia Bowl. NIU was led by senior running back Garrett Wolfe, who led the nation in rushing with 1,900 yards coming into the game, but was held to just 20 yards by the TCU defense.

=== College football's mystery man ===
Heading into his senior year, Blake was named to the watch lists for both the Lombardi and Lott awards once again. He rose into the top five on some early 2008 NFL draft boards and drew wide comparisons to Dwight Freeney for his burst off the ball and his straight-line speed. Dave Campbell's Texas Football featured Blake on its 2007 cover alongside Texas A&M quarterback Stephen McGee and Texas quarterback Colt McCoy.

On August 16, 2007, Blake left practice early after an argument with coaches, eventually missing five games with an undisclosed leave of absence that no one at TCU seemed to want to discuss. When he returned to the field for the final four games of the regular season, he did not appear ready to play; he appeared overweight and at times visibly uninterested. His draft stock plummeted. Further, he played slow, collecting only four sacks and eight tackles for a loss among 21 total tackles. Following the regular season, he was invited to the East-West Shrine Game and checked in at 287 pounds. He had played as a junior in the 255-260 range.

After extended speculation during the 2007 NCAA Division I FBS football season, Blake's agent Reggie Rouzan revealed in February 2008 that Blake was being treated for depression and social anxiety disorder, which privacy laws had prohibited TCU from disclosing publicly. The daily presence of scouts was reported as what drove Blake off the practice field in August, but Blake believes it was what he estimates to be around 300 daily calls from prospective scouts that brought about his mental illness.

Initially, he did not seek professional help for his problems during his sabbatical from the team, and instead spending his time in Aransas Pass with his family. Eventually, and upon TCU head coach Gary Patterson's insistence, Blake attended counseling sessions and began taking medication.

Instead of attending the NFL Scouting Combine, Blake underwent several psychological tests in a nearby Indianapolis hospital on February 24, 2008. He took his first metaphorical step toward rebuilding his NFL draft stock at TCU's pro day Thursday March 6, 2008, when he showed up weighing 272 pounds and ran a hand-held time of 4.75 in the 40-yard dash, the same time run by top defensive end prospect Chris Long of the University of Virginia. He also had 23 reps in the 225-pound bench press, better than the University of Miami's Calais Campbell's 16 reps or Clemson's Phillip Merling's 17, and logged a 30 1/2-inch vertical jump and a broad jump of 9 ft, 3 in. He was not drafted in the 2008 NFL draft and attended the Tampa Bay Buccaneers' minicamp as a free agent.
