= Rabb, Texas =

Unincorporated community in Texas, US

Coordinates: 27°48′02″N 97°45′01″W

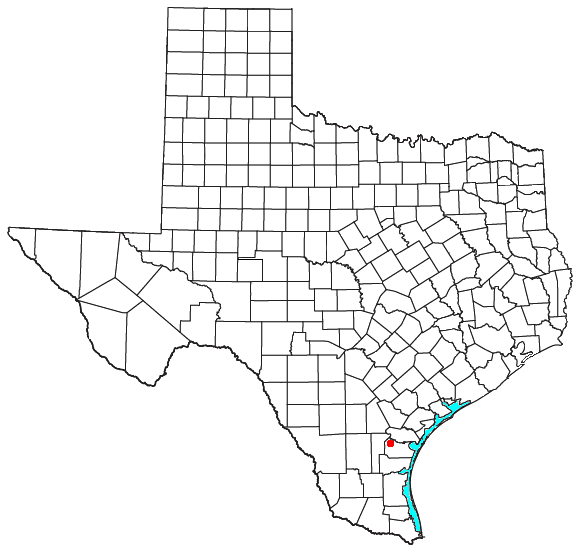

Rabb is an unincorporated community in Nueces County, Texas, United States. It lies along the Texas Mexican Railway in the northwestern part of the county.

== Education ==
Rabb is served by the Robstown Independent School District.
