= La Paloma-Lost Creek, Texas =

- CDP
- Coordinates: 27°43′5″N 97°44′30″W
- Country: United States
- State: Texas
- County: Nueces

Area
  - Total: 8.3 sq mi (21.5 km^{2})
  - Land: 8.3 sq mi (21.5 km^{2})
  - Water: 0 sq mi (0.0 km^{2})

Population (2020)
  - Total: 1,359
  - Density: 164/sq mi (63.2/km^{2})
- Time zone: UTC-6 (Central (CST))
  - Summer (DST): UTC-5 (CDT)
- FIPS code: 48-41422

La Paloma-Lost Creek is a census-designated place (CDP) in Nueces County, Texas, United States. The population was 1,359 at the 2020 census, significantly up from 408 at the 2010 census.

== Geography ==
La Paloma-Lost Creek is located at 27°43′05″N 97°44′30″W (27.717921, -97.741803).

According to the United States Census Bureau, the CDP has a total area of 8.3 square miles (21 km^{2}), all land.

== Demographics ==
Historical population
Census	Pop.	Note	%±
2000	323		—
2010	408		26.3%
2020	1,359		233.1%
U.S. Decennial Census; 1850–1900 1910; 1920 1930 1940; 1950 1960 1970; 1980 1990 2000; 2010 2020

La Paloma-Lost Creek first appeared as a census designated place in the 2000 U.S. census.

=== 2020 census ===
La Paloma-Lost Creek CDP, Texas – Racial and ethnic composition Note: the US Census treats Hispanic/Latino as an ethnic category. This table excludes Latinos from the racial categories and assigns them to a separate category. Hispanics/Latinos may be of any race.
Race / Ethnicity (NH = Non-Hispanic)	Pop 2000	Pop 2010	Pop 2020	% 2000	% 2010	% 2020
White alone (NH)	69	105	705	21.36%	25.74%	51.88%
Black or African American alone (NH)	13	0	8	4.02%	0.00%	0.59%
Native American or Alaska Native alone (NH)	0	0	2	0.00%	0.00%	0.15%
Asian alone (NH)	1	1	1	0.31%	0.25%	0.07%
Native Hawaiian or Pacific Islander alone (NH)	0	0	0	0.00%	0.00%	0.00%
Other race alone (NH)	0	0	3	0.00%	0.00%	0.22%
Mixed race or Multiracial (NH)	0	1	11	0.00%	0.25%	0.81%
Hispanic or Latino (any race)	240	301	629	74.30%	73.77%	46.28%
Total	323	408	1,359	100.00%	100.00%	100.00%

=== 2000 census ===
As of the census of 2000, 323 people, 76 households, and 65 families were residing in the CDP. The population density was 38.9 people/sq mi (15.0/km^{2}). Its 92 housing units averaged 11.1/sq mi (4.3/km^{2}). The racial makeup of the CDP was 67.18% White, 4.02% African American, 0.31% Asian, 22.60% from other races, and 5.88% from two or more races. Hispanics or Latinos of any race were 74.30% of the population.

Of the 76 households, 55.3% had children under 18 living with them, 73.7% were married couples living together, 5.3% had a female householder with no husband present, and 13.2% were not families. About 9.2% of all households were made up of individuals, and 3.9% had someone living alone who was 65 or older. The average household size was 3.88, and the average family size was 3.80.

In the CDP, the age distribution was 47.4% under 18, 8.0% from 18 to 24, 22.6% from 25 to 44, 17.6% from 45 to 64, and 4.3% who were 65 older. The median age was 19 years. For every 100 females, there were 121.2 males. For every 100 females age 18 and over, there were 102.4 males.

The median income for a household in the CDP was $37,708, and for a family was $39,167. Males had a median income of $40,833 versus $25,893 for females. The per capita income for the CDP was $9,955. About 22.2% of families and 34.7% of the population were below the poverty line, including 44.0% of those under age 18 and none of those age 65 or over.

== Education ==
La Paloma-Lost Creek is served by, in separate sections, the Driscoll, Robstown, Bishop Consolidated, and Banquete Independent School Districts.

Del Mar College is the designated community college for all of Nueces County.
