= Redfish Bay =

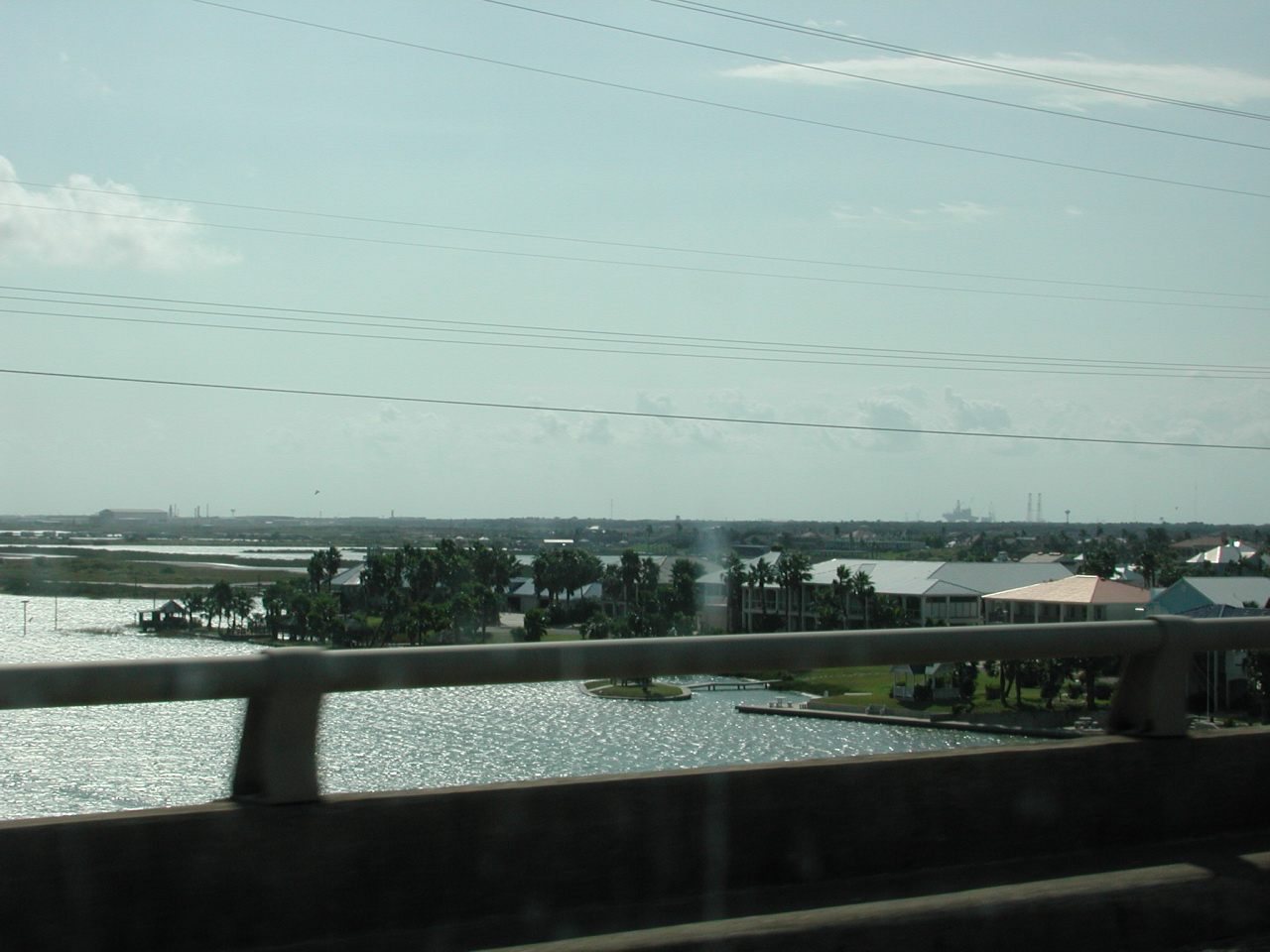
- Redfish Bay view at Aransas Pass and Ingleside

- Redfish Bay on Texas Coast Redfish Bay (the United States)

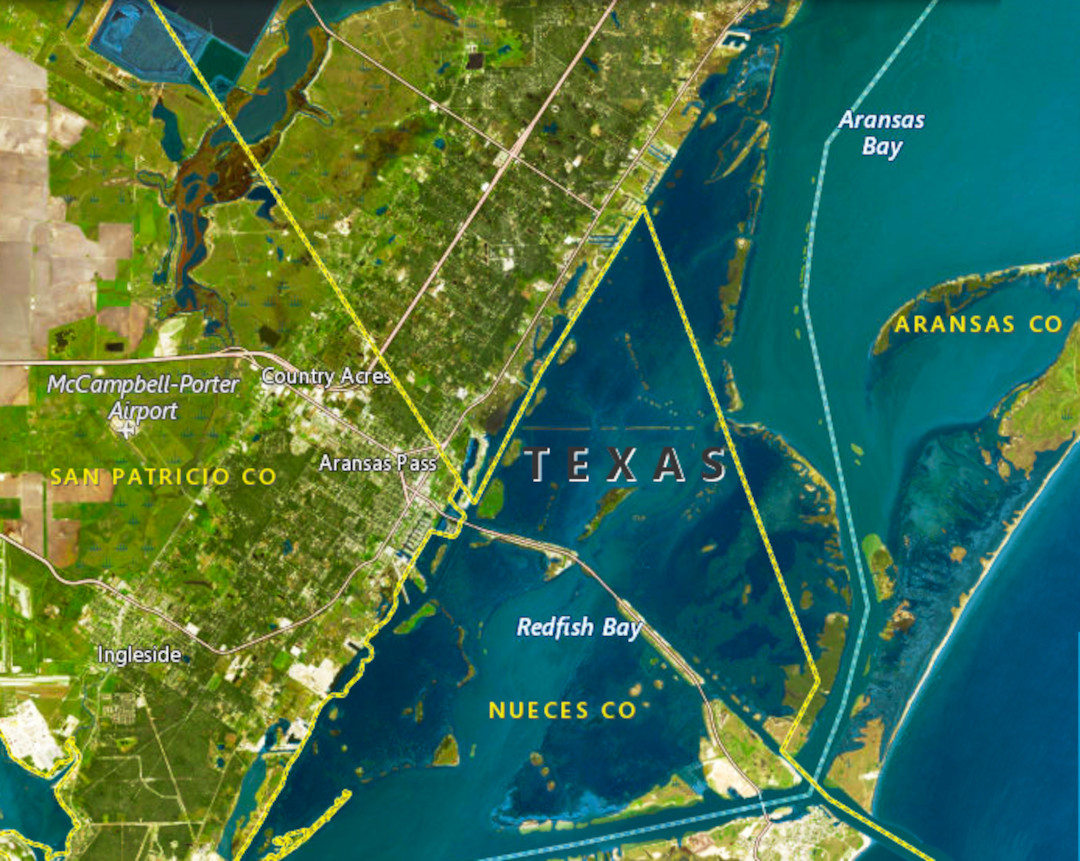
- Redfish Bay at Aransas Pass
- Location: Aransas Pass, Texas; Estes, Texas; Ingleside, Texas; Nueces County, Texas
- Coordinates: 27.9078°N 97.11277°W
- Type: Bay
- Part of: Aransas Bay; Gulf Intracoastal Waterway; Laguna Madre
- Ocean/sea sources: Gulf of Mexico
- Basin countries: United States
- Islands: Hog Island; Ransom Island; Stedman Island

Redfish Bay is a southwestern extension of Aransas Bay in Texas, north of Corpus Christi Bay. It separates the cities of Aransas Pass and Ingleside from Port Aransas on Mustang Island.

== Features ==
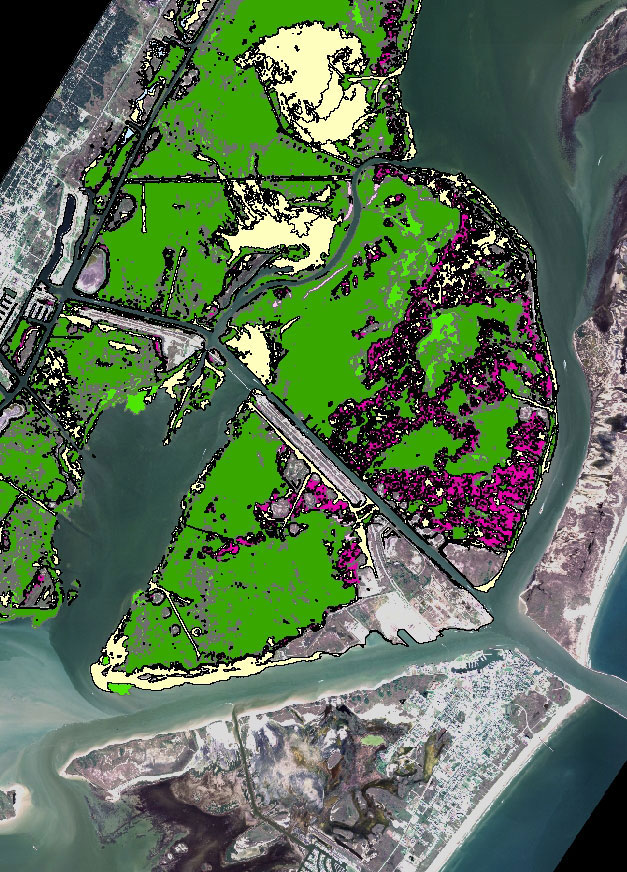
Benthic map of Redfish Bay shows seagrass (green), oyster reefs (pink), sand bottom (yellow), mangroves (magenta), and salt marsh (light blue).

Redfish Bay is found at N 27.9078 and W -97.11277. Overall, it is extremely shallow, and contains several small islands, salt marshes, channels, and shallow mudflats. The bridge from Aransas Pass to Port Aransas splits the bay into two sections.

== Ecosystem ==
The northernmost extensive beds of seagrass in Texas, including turtle grass (Thalassia testudinum) and shoal grass (Halodule beaudettei), are found in the bay. In June 2000, the Texas Parks and Wildlife Department designated the bay as a scientific area to study the seagrass, as a result, the Redfish Bay State Scientific Area was established. By May 2006, new boating regulations were put in place to prevent damage to the grass. Every February since 2007, the city of Aransas Pass holds the Redfish Bay Trash Parade and Coastal Cleanup, an event that encourages the removal of trash and waste from the bay. In 2009, 90 volunteers cleared three pickup loads of trash that included syringes, construction hard hats, ribbons, and deflated balloons.

The bay contains 32,000 acres (130 km^{2}; 50 sq mi) of fish habitat, and is a popular fishing destination along the Texas Coastal Bend. Between 1975 and 1987, millions of red drum (Sciaenops ocellatus) were stocked in the bay. Along with the drum, flounder can be found, as well as seatrout (Cynoscion species), which dwell in the seagrass and muddy bottoms. Red tides have been known to affect the bay, including a 1986 tide that resulted in a major fish kill. Months later, another tide swept the bay and Corpus Christi Bay to the south. A fish-killing microorganism was found in Corpus Christi Bay that was believed to be responsible.

== Industry ==
Petroleum has been found at the bottom of the bay. In December 1983, three people were injured and between $2 and $3 million of damage was done to the Corpus Christi Oil Refining Corporation's Redfish Bay Terminal near the bay in Aransas Pass, following an explosion of five oil tanks.
