= Nueces County Keach Family Library =

- 27°47′30″N 97°39′10″W
- Location: 1000 Terry Shamsie Boulevard; Robstown, Texas 78380, United States

Collection
- Size: 47055

Access and use
- Circulation: 13076
- Population served: 28910

Other information
- Director: Ida Gonzalez‑Garza
- Website: Nueces County Keach Family Library

The Nueces County Keach Family Library is affiliated with the Nueces County, TX government. The hope, according to Nueces County Commissioner Oscar Ortiz, a Robstown native and current Commissioner of Precinct 3 in Nueces County, is that the projects will spur development along U.S. Highway 77, and jobs for Robstown’s citizens. The building is 15,000 square feet (1,400 m^{2}) located in the center of Nueces County at 1000 Terry Shamsie Boulevard in Robstown, Texas. The library is located at the entrance of the Richard M. Borchard Regional Fairgrounds. The Nueces County Keach Family Library has another library affiliated with it which is located in Bishop. The Bishop Branch library is in conjunction with the library.

The Keach Family Library was named after five generations of Fore‑Keach family who dedicated their lives to enhancing the community of education and service goals through their local community newspaper. The Keach Family Library is a new library that was moved from Main Road to U.S. Highway 77.

== Interior design ==
The interior design consists of Spanish tile roofing, limestone flooring, and cavernous half-barrel ceiling. There is a café with indoor seating and an outdoor seating area patio. The building also has a children’s reading space called Pop Pop’s Place, with a glass half-moon layout so the children can encircle storytellers. A flat screen T.V. is in Pop's place for movie day in the children's area. There are pictures of the Sam Keach and his grandchildren around Pop Pop's Place. Carpet is the flooring inside the library except for the entrance and hallway. By the entrance there is the front desk to check in and check out borrowed items. There is a brass statue in the entrance with a lady and child sitting on a bench near the front entrance.

The Keach Family library has interesting features and events for all ages in the community. It consists of a child's area, computer workstations with high-speed internet access, wireless internet service for laptops, study rooms, public meeting rooms such as the Multipurpose room, an outdoor deck overlooking a wetland pond and the baseball stadium. The building is currently going under contract to find a coffee shop.

According to librarytechnology the collection of the library consists of 47055 volumes. The library circulates 13076 items per year and serves a community of 29810 residents.

== Statistics ==
Distribution	Numbers	Titles
Service Population	28910	Residents
Collection size	47055	Volumes
Annual Circulation	13076	Transactions

The total construction cost for the Keach Family library was estimated at $5.3 M. The size is 18,000 square feet (1,670 square metres) feet and the amount allocated for equipment, including books was in excess of $250,000.

== Events ==
The library has activities like storytime with Mr Kippy on Tuesday evenings and arts and crafts with Ms Chapa on Thursday afternoon and Saturday mornings. There are adult literacy classes that are funded by the State of Texas. There have been events at the library that include arts and crafts, and public events such as Children's day/Book day founded by Pat Mora. In 2012 the Keach Library had a big attendance for Dia Del Los Ninos

There has been an esteemed South Texas author, educator who spoke in the Nueces County Keach Family Library. On Saturday, October 17, 2009 Dr. Arnoldo De Leon gave a presentation in the Multipurpose Room. The event was co-sponsored by Texas A&M University-Kingsville and its Office of Vice President for Student Affairs, Southwest Borderlands Research Center, Department of psychology and sociology, and Department of history; and the Nueces County Keach Family Library. On February 28, 2013 Award-winning author Gary Soto gave a book talk on Sunday evening. The BookTalk event was co-sponsored by the Robstown ISD Literacy Program for Read Across America. During holidays characters visit during Easter and Christmas time. The Easter Bunny and Santa Claus have stopped by at the library for pictures. There are arts and crafts and storytelling for toddlers and a summer reading club that residents and patrons can participate.

The current Library Director is Ida Gonzalez-Garza and the Youth Service Reference Librarian is Laura Chapa.
