= PAISD =

PAISD can refer to:

- Port Aransas Independent School District - Port Aransas is a city in Nueces County, Texas.
- Port Arthur Independent School District - Port Arthur Independent School District is a public school district based in Port Arthur, Texas.
