= Agua Dulce High School =

Location
- 1 Longhorn Dr. Agua Dulce, Texas 78330-0250; United States

Information
- School type: Public high school
- School district: Agua Dulce Independent School District
- Principal: Christopher Daniels
- Teaching staff: 19.86 (FTE)
- Grades: 6-12
- Enrollment: 243 (2024–2025)
- Student to teacher ratio: 12.24
- Colors: Maroon & White
- Athletics conference: UIL Class 2A
- Mascot: Longhorn/Lady Horn
- Website: Agua Dulce High School

Agua Dulce High School is a public high school located in the city of Agua Dulce, Texas and classified as a 2A school by the UIL. It is a part of the Agua Dulce Independent School District located in western Nueces County and eastern Jim Wells County. In 2015, the school was rated "Met Standard" by the Texas Education Agency.

== Athletics ==
The Agua Dulce Longhorns compete in these sports

Volleyball, Cross Country, Football, Basketball, Powerlifting, Golf, Track & Baseball
