= Country Acres, Texas =

- Former census-designated place
- Interactive map of Country Acres, Texas
- Coordinates: 27°55′30″N 97°9′58″W
- Country: United States
- State: Texas
- County: San Patricio

Area
  - Total: 0.1 sq mi (0.26 km^{2})
  - Land: 0.1 sq mi (0.26 km^{2})
  - Water: 0.0 sq mi (0 km^{2})

Population (2020)
  - Total: 163
  - Density: 1,600/sq mi (630/km^{2})
- Time zone: UTC-6 (Central (CST))
  - Summer (DST): UTC-5 (CDT)
- Zip Code: 78336

Country Acres is a former census-designated place (CDP) in San Patricio County, Texas, United States. As of the 2020 census, Country Acres had a population of 163. Prior to the 2010 census, Country Acres was part of the Falman-County Acres CDP. In 2022, it was annexed by the city of Aransas Pass.

== Geography ==
Country Acres is located at 27°55′30″N 97°9′58″W (27.925064, -97.166012).

== Demographics ==
Historical population
Census	Pop.	Note	%±
2010	185		—
2020	163		−11.9%
U.S. Decennial Census; 1850–1900 1910; 1920 1930 1940; 1950 1960 1970; 1980 1990 2000; 2010

Country Acres first appeared as a census designated place in the 2010 U.S. census after the Falman-County Acres CDP was split into the Falman CDP and the Country Acres CDP. The U.S. Census Bureau deleted the CDP in 2022 after the community was absorbed into the city of Aransas Pass.

=== 2020 census ===
Country Acres CDP, Texas – Racial and ethnic composition Note: the US Census treats Hispanic/Latino as an ethnic category. This table excludes Latinos from the racial categories and assigns them to a separate category. Hispanics/Latinos may be of any race.
Race / Ethnicity (NH = Non-Hispanic)	Pop 2010	Pop 2020	% 2010	% 2020
White alone (NH)	109	89	58.92%	54.60%
Black or African American alone (NH)	4	7	2.16%	4.29%
Native American or Alaska Native alone (NH)	0	0	0.00%	0.00%
Asian alone (NH)	4	1	2.16%	0.61%
Pacific Islander alone (NH)	0	0	0.00%	0.00%
Other race alone (NH)	1	0	0.54%	0.00%
Mixed race or Multiracial (NH)	6	5	3.24%	3.07%
Hispanic or Latino (any race)	61	61	32.97%	37.42%
Total	185	163	100.00%	100.00%

== Education ==
The CDP is part of the Aransas Pass Independent School District.

Del Mar College is the designated community college for all of San Patricio County.
