= Falman, Texas =

- Census-designated place
- Interactive map of Falman, Texas
- Coordinates: 27°55′41″N 97°10′17″W
- Country: United States
- State: Texas
- County: San Patricio

Area
  - Total: 0.1 sq mi (0.26 km^{2})
  - Land: 0.1 sq mi (0.26 km^{2})
  - Water: 0.0 sq mi (0 km^{2})

Population (2010)
  - Total: 76
  - Density: 760/sq mi (290/km^{2})
- Time zone: UTC-6 (Central (CST))
  - Summer (DST): UTC-5 (CDT)
- Zip Code: 78336

Falman is a census-designated place (CDP) in San Patricio County, Texas, United States. As of the 2020 census, Falman had a population of 60. Prior to the 2010 census, Falman was part of the Falman-County Acres CDP.

Now it is a part of the City of Aransas Pass.

== Geography ==
Falman is located at 27°55′41″N 97°10′17″W (27.928053, -97.171276).

== Demographics ==
Historical population
Census	Pop.	Note	%±
2010	76		—
2020	60		−21.1%
U.S. Decennial Census; 1850–1900 1910; 1920 1930 1940; 1950 1960 1970; 1980 1990 2000; 2010 2020

Falman first appeared as a census designated place in the 2010 U.S. census after the Falman-County Acres CDP was split into the Falman CDP and the Country Acres CDP.

Falman CDP, Texas – Racial and ethnic composition Note: the US Census treats Hispanic/Latino as an ethnic category. This table excludes Latinos from the racial categories and assigns them to a separate category. Hispanics/Latinos may be of any race.
Race / Ethnicity (NH = Non-Hispanic)	Pop 2010	Pop 2020	% 2010	% 2020
White alone (NH)	59	32	77.63%	53.33%
Black or African American alone (NH)	1	0	1.32%	0.00%
Native American or Alaska Native alone (NH)	2	0	2.63%	0.00%
Asian alone (NH)	0	1	0.00%	1.67%
Native Hawaiian or Pacific Islander alone (NH)	0	0	0.00%	0.00%
Other race alone (NH)	0	1	0.00%	1.67%
Mixed race or Multiracial (NH)	0	4	0.00%	6.67%
Hispanic or Latino (any race)	14	22	18.42%	36.67%
Total	76	60	100.00%	100.00%

== Education ==
It is in the Aransas Pass Independent School District.

Del Mar College is the designated community college for all of San Patricio County.
