= Falman-County Acres, Texas =

- former CDP
- Coordinates: 27°55′31″N 97°10′3″W
- Country: United States
- State: Texas
- County: San Patricio

Area
  - Total: 0.23 sq mi (0.6 km^{2})
  - Land: 0.23 sq mi (0.6 km^{2})
  - Water: 0 sq mi (0.0 km^{2})

Population (2000)
  - Total: 289
  - Density: 1,170/sq mi (452/km^{2})
- Time zone: UTC-6 (Central (CST))
  - Summer (DST): UTC-5 (CDT)
- FIPS code: 48-25398

Falman-County Acres is a census-designated place (CDP) in San Patricio County, Texas, United States. The population was 289 at the 2000 census.

The Falman-County Acres CDP was created for the 2000 census, then deleted in the 2010 census, with parts taken to form Country Acres and Falman CDPs. The area became a part of the City of Aransas Pass.

== Geography ==
Falman-County Acres is located at 27°55′31″N 97°10′3″W (27.925416, -97.167400).

According to the United States Census Bureau, the CDP has a total area of 0.2 square miles (0.52 km^{2}), all land.

== Demographics ==
Historical population
Census	Pop.	Note	%±
2000	289		—
U.S. Decennial Census; 1850–1900 1910; 1920 1930 1940; 1950 1960 1970; 1980 1990 2000; 2010

Falman-County Acres first appeared as a census designated place in the 2000 U.S. census. It was split into the Falman and the Country Acres CDPs prior to the 2010 U.S. census.

=== 2000 census ===
Falman-County Acres CDP, Texas – Racial and ethnic composition Note: the US Census treats Hispanic/Latino as an ethnic category. This table excludes Latinos from the racial categories and assigns them to a separate category. Hispanics/Latinos may be of any race.
Race / Ethnicity (NH = Non-Hispanic)	Pop 2000	% 2000
White alone (NH)	229	79.24%
Black or African American alone (NH)	4	1.38%
Native American or Alaska Native alone (NH)	0	0.00%
Asian alone (NH)	0	0.00%
Pacific Islander alone (NH)	0	0.00%
Other race alone (NH)	0	0.00%
Mixed race or Multiracial (NH)	2	0.69%
Hispanic or Latino (any race)	54	18.69%
Total	289	100.00%

As of the census of 2000, there were 289 people, 95 households, and 76 families residing in the CDP. The population density was 1,170.7 inhabitants per square mile (452.0/km^{2}). There were 100 housing units at an average density of 405.1 per square mile (156.4/km^{2}). The racial makeup of the CDP was 92.73% White, 1.38% African American, 4.84% from other races, and 1.04% from two or more races. Hispanic or Latino of any race were 18.69% of the population.

There were 95 households, out of which 37.9% had children under the age of 18 living with them, 54.7% were married couples living together, 17.9% had a female householder with no husband present, and 20.0% were non-families. 16.8% of all households were made up of individuals, and 5.3% had someone living alone who was 65 years of age or older. The average household size was 3.04 and the average family size was 3.29.

In the CDP, the population was spread out, with 31.8% under the age of 18, 8.3% from 18 to 24, 31.8% from 25 to 44, 15.9% from 45 to 64, and 12.1% who were 65 years of age or older. The median age was 33 years. For every 100 females, there were 107.9 males. For every 100 females age 18 and over, there were 89.4 males.

The median income for a household in the CDP was $26,354, and the median income for a family was $27,188. Males had a median income of $42,917 versus $13,750 for females. The per capita income for the CDP was $12,418. About 11.7% of families and 15.2% of the population were below the poverty line, including 33.3% of those under the age of eighteen and none of those 65 or over.

== Education ==
The area of Falman-County Acres CDP was, and is, served by the Aransas Pass Independent School District.

Del Mar College is the designated community college for all of San Patricio County, effective September 1, 1995.
