= Spring Garden-Terra Verde, Texas =

- former CDP
- Coordinates: 27°45′42″N 97°43′32″W
- Country: United States
- State: Texas
- County: Nueces

Area
  - Total: 3.0 sq mi (7.8 km^{2})
  - Land: 3.0 sq mi (7.8 km^{2})
  - Water: 0 sq mi (0.0 km^{2})

Population (2000)
  - Total: 693
  - Density: 229/sq mi (88.3/km^{2})
- Time zone: UTC-6 (Central (CST))
  - Summer (DST): UTC-5 (CDT)
- FIPS code: 48-69710

Spring Garden-Terra Verde is a census-designated place (CDP) in Nueces County, Texas, United States. The population was 693 at the 2000 census.

Spring Garden-Terra Verde CDP split into the Spring Gardens CDP and the Tierra Verde CDP for the 2010 census.

== Geography ==
Spring Garden-Terra Verde is located at 27°45′42″N 97°43′32″W (27.761568, -97.725473).

According to the United States Census Bureau, the CDP has a total area of 3.0 square miles (7.8 km^{2}), all land.

== Demographics ==
Historical population
Census	Pop.	Note	%±
2000	693		—
U.S. Decennial Census; 1850–1900 1910; 1920 1930 1940; 1950 1960 1970; 1980 1990 2000; 2010

Spring Garden-Terra Verde first appeared as a census designated place in the 2000 U.S. census. It was split into the Terra Verde CDP and the Spring Gardens CDP prior to the 2010 U.S. census.

Spring Garden-Terra Verde CDP, Texas – Racial and ethnic composition Note: the US Census treats Hispanic/Latino as an ethnic category. This table excludes Latinos from the racial categories and assigns them to a separate category. Hispanics/Latinos may be of any race.
Race / Ethnicity (NH = Non-Hispanic)	Pop 2000	% 2000
White alone (NH)	20	2.89%
Black or African American alone (NH)	0	0.00%
Native American or Alaska Native alone (NH)	0	0.00%
Asian alone (NH)	0	0.00%
Pacific Islander alone (NH)	0	0.00%
Other race alone (NH)	0	0.00%
Mixed race or Multiracial (NH)	0	0.00%
Hispanic or Latino (any race)	673	97.11%
Total	693	100.00%

As of the census of 2000, there were 693 people, 178 households, and 155 families residing in the CDP. The population density was 228.7 inhabitants per square mile (88.3/km^{2}). There were 211 housing units at an average density of 69.6 per square mile (26.9/km^{2}). The racial makeup of the CDP was 68.25% White, 0.43% African American, 0.72% Native American, 28.43% from other races, and 2.16% from two or more races. Hispanic or Latino of any race were 97.11% of the population.

There were 178 households, out of which 57.9% had children under the age of 18 living with them, 66.9% were married couples living together, 13.5% had a female householder with no husband present, and 12.4% were non-families. 11.2% of all households were made up of individuals, and 5.1% had someone living alone who was 65 years of age or older. The average household size was 3.89 and the average family size was 4.20.

In the CDP, the population was spread out, with 40.8% under the age of 18, 11.3% from 18 to 24, 29.0% from 25 to 44, 13.4% from 45 to 64, and 5.5% who were 65 years of age or older. The median age was 23 years. For every 100 females, there were 111.3 males. For every 100 females age 18 and over, there were 102.0 males.

The median income for a household in the CDP was $17,188, and the median income for a family was $17,396. Males had a median income of $22,574 versus $14,444 for females. The per capita income for the CDP was $5,223. About 56.6% of families and 68.0% of the population were below the poverty line, including 78.6% of those under age 18 and none of those age 65 or over.

== Education ==
Spring Garden-Terra Verde is served by the Robstown Independent School District.

Del Mar College is the designated community college for all of Nueces County, and has been since 1995.
