= Tierra Verde =

Tierra Verde may refer to:

- Tierra Verde, Florida
- Tierra Verde, Texas
- The Tierra Verde housing complex connected to Maritime Square in Hong Kong
