= Banquete, Texas =

- CDP
- Interactive map of Banquete, Texas
- Coordinates: 27°48′2″N 97°47′50″W
- Country: United States
- State: Texas
- County: Nueces

Area
  - Total: 2.3 sq mi (6.0 km^{2})
  - Land: 2.3 sq mi (6.0 km^{2})
  - Water: 0 sq mi (0.0 km^{2})

Population (2010)
  - Total: 726
  - Density: 310/sq mi (120/km^{2})
- Time zone: UTC-6 (Central (CST))
  - Summer (DST): UTC-5 (CDT)
- Zip Code: 78339, 78380
- FIPS code: 48-05576

Banquete (/bæŋˈkɛti/ bang-KET-ee) is a census-designated place (CDP) in Nueces County, Texas, United States. Banquete is located at the intersection of State Highway 44 and FM 666, 23 miles west of Corpus Christi. Banquete should not be confused with Rancho Banquete, a census-designated place situated several miles west of the community.

Banquete was first listed as a CDP in the 2010 census. As of the 2020 census, Banquete had a population of 745.

== Geography ==
Banquete is located at 27°48′2″N 97°47′50″W (27.800641, -97.797179). The CDP has a total area of 2.3 square miles (6.0 km^{2}), all land.

== History ==
Banquete was named for a four-day feast honoring the completion of a road linking San Patricio, Texas, with Matamoros, Tamaulipas, Mexico. The community was also a stop on the Texas Mexican Railway, and was also the place of Camp Charles Russell, a military camp to train CSA soldiers.

== Education ==
The Banquete Independent School District serves area students. Their latest graduating class consisted of 55 seniors.

Del Mar College is the designated community college for all of Nueces County.

== Climate ==
The climate in this area is characterized by hot, humid summers and generally mild to cool winters. According to the Köppen climate classification, Banquete has a humid subtropical climate, Cfa on climate maps.

== Demographics ==
Historical population
Census	Pop.	Note	%±
2010	726		—
2020	745		2.6%
U.S. Decennial Census; 1850–1900 1910; 1920 1930 1940; 1950 1960 1970; 1980 1990 2000; 2010 2020

Banquete first appeared as a census designated place in the 2010 U.S. census.

Banquete CDP, Texas – Racial and ethnic composition Note: the US Census treats Hispanic/Latino as an ethnic category. This table excludes Latinos from the racial categories and assigns them to a separate category. Hispanics/Latinos may be of any race.
Race / Ethnicity (NH = Non-Hispanic)	Pop 2010	Pop 2020	% 2010	% 2020
White alone (NH)	48	55	6.61%	7.38%
Black or African American alone (NH)	0	4	0.00%	0.54%
Native American or Alaska Native alone (NH)	0	0	0.00%	0.00%
Asian alone (NH)	0	1	0.00%	0.13%
Native Hawaiian or Pacific Islander alone (NH)	0	0	0.00%	0.00%
Other race alone (NH)	0	0	0.00%	0.00%
Mixed race or Multiracial (NH)	5	6	0.69%	0.81%
Hispanic or Latino (any race)	673	679	92.70%	91.14%
Total	726	745	100.00%	100.00%

== Notable person ==
- Konni Burton, Republican member of the Texas State Senate from Tarrant County, was reared in Banquete, where her father was the school principal.
