= Spring Gardens, Texas =

- CDP
- Interactive map of Spring Gardens, Texas
- Coordinates: 27°45′42″N 97°44′31″W
- Country: United States
- State: Texas
- County: Nueces

Area
  - Total: 1.0 sq mi (2.6 km^{2})
  - Land: 1.0 sq mi (2.6 km^{2})
  - Water: 0 sq mi (0.0 km^{2})

Population (2010)
  - Total: 563
  - Density: 560/sq mi (220/km^{2})
- Time zone: UTC-6 (Central (CST))
  - Summer (DST): UTC-5 (CDT)
- Zip Code: 78380

Spring Gardens is a census-designated place (CDP) in Nueces County, Texas, United States. As of the 2020 census, Spring Gardens had a population of 497. Prior to the 2010 census Spring Gardens was part of the Spring Garden-Terra Verde CDP.

== Geography ==
Spring Gardens is located at 27°45′42″N 97°44′31″W (27.761529, -97.741873). The CDP has a total area of 1.0 square mile (2.6 km^{2}), all land.

== Demographics ==
Historical population
Census	Pop.	Note	%±
2010	563		—
2020	497		−11.7%
U.S. Decennial Census; 1850–1900 1910; 1920 1930 1940; 1950 1960 1970; 1980 1990 2000; 2010 2020

Spring Gardens first appeared as a census designated place in the 2010 U.S. census after the deleted Spring Garden-Terra Verde CDP was split into the Spring Gardens CDP and the Tierra Verde CDP.

=== 2020 census ===
Spring Gardens CDP, Texas – Racial and ethnic composition Note: the US Census treats Hispanic/Latino as an ethnic category. This table excludes Latinos from the racial categories and assigns them to a separate category. Hispanics/Latinos may be of any race.
Race / Ethnicity (NH = Non-Hispanic)	Pop 2010	Pop 2020	% 2010	% 2020
White alone (NH)	16	25	2.84%	5.03%
Black or African American alone (NH)	0	0	0.00%	0.00%
Native American or Alaska Native alone (NH)	0	1	0.00%	0.20%
Asian alone (NH)	3	1	0.53%	0.20%
Native Hawaiian or Pacific Islander alone (NH)	0	0	0.00%	0.00%
Other race alone (NH)	0	1	0.00%	0.20%
Mixed race or Multiracial (NH)	0	1	0.00%	0.20%
Hispanic or Latino (any race)	544	468	96.63%	94.16%
Total	563	497	100.00%	100.00%

== Education ==
It is in the Robstown Independent School District.

Del Mar College is the designated community college for all of Nueces County.
