= Petronila, Texas =

- City
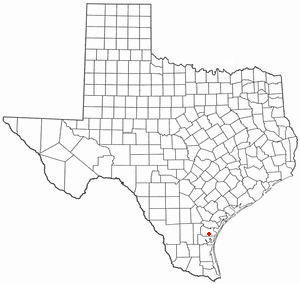
- Location of Petronila, Texas

- Coordinates: 27°40′29″N 97°38′11″W
- Country: United States
- State: Texas
- County: Nueces

Area
  - Total: 1.83 sq mi (4.73 km^{2})
  - Land: 1.83 sq mi (4.73 km^{2})
  - Water: 0 sq mi (0.00 km^{2})
- Elevation: 49 ft (15 m)

Population (2020)
  - Total: 89
  - Density: 65.8/sq mi (25.39/km^{2})
- Time zone: UTC-6 (Central (CST))
  - Summer (DST): UTC-5 (CDT)
- ZIP code: 78380
- Area code: 361
- FIPS code: 48-57056
- GNIS feature ID: 1343913

Petronila is a city in Nueces County, Texas, United States. The population of the city was 89 at the 2020 census.

== Geography ==
Petronila is located at 27°40′29″N 97°38′11″W (27.674613, –97.636360).

According to the United States Census Bureau, the city has a total area of 1.8 square miles (4.7 km^{2}), all land.

== Demographics ==
Historical population
Census	Pop.	Note	%±
1990	155		—
2000	83		−46.5%
2010	113		36.1%
2020	89		−21.2%
U.S. Decennial Census

As of the 2020 census, there were 89 people residing in Petronila. The median age was 40.8 years; 28.1% of residents were under the age of 18 and 18.0% were 65 years of age or older. For every 100 females there were 78.0 males, and for every 100 females age 18 and over there were 88.2 males age 18 and over.

0.0% of residents lived in urban areas, while 100.0% lived in rural areas.

There were 24 households in Petronila, of which 45.8% had children under the age of 18 living in them. Of all households, 83.3% were married-couple households, 0.0% were households with a male householder and no spouse or partner present, and 16.7% were households with a female householder and no spouse or partner present. About 12.5% of all households were made up of individuals and 0.0% had someone living alone who was 65 years of age or older.

There were 39 housing units, of which 38.5% were vacant. The homeowner vacancy rate was 9.5% and the rental vacancy rate was 10.0%.

Racial composition as of the 2020 census
Race	Number	Percent
White	52	58.4%
Black or African American	1	1.1%
American Indian and Alaska Native	3	3.4%
Asian	4	4.5%
Native Hawaiian and Other Pacific Islander	0	0.0%
Some other race	3	3.4%
Two or more races	26	29.2%
Hispanic or Latino (of any race)	43	48.3%

=== 2000 census ===
As of the 2000 census, there were 83 people, 30 households, and 24 families residing in the city. The population density was 46.3 inhabitants per square mile (17.9/km^{2}). There were 40 housing units at an average density of 22.3/sq mi (8.6/km^{2}). The racial makeup of the city was 73.49% White, 1.20% African American, 1.20% Native American, 21.69% from other races, and 2.41% from two or more races. Hispanic or Latino of any race were 33.73% of the population.

There were 30 households, out of which 46.7% had children under the age of 18 living with them, 63.3% were married couples living together, 6.7% had a female householder with no husband present, and 20.0% were non-families. 13.3% of all households were made up of individuals, and 6.7% had someone living alone who was 65 years of age or older. The average household size was 2.77 and the average family size was 3.00.

In the city, the population was spread out, with 27.7% under the age of 18, 6.0% from 18 to 24, 28.9% from 25 to 44, 26.5% from 45 to 64, and 10.8% who were 65 years of age or older. The median age was 36 years. For every 100 females, there were 102.4 males. For every 100 females age 18 and over, there were 106.9 males.

The median income for a household in the city was $51,250, and the median income for a family was $60,417. Males had a median income of $21,250 versus $23,750 for females. The per capita income for the city was $24,181. There were 3.7% of families and 5.3% of the population living below the poverty line, including 9.1% of under eighteens and 6.7% of those over 64.

== Education ==
The City of Petronila is served by the Bishop Consolidated Independent School District. Bishop CISD operates Petronila Elementary School. The district secondary schools are Lillion E. Luehrs Junior High (grades 6-8) and Bishop High School (grades 9-12).

Del Mar College is the designated community college for all of Nueces County.
