= Agua Dulce, Nueces County, Texas =

Agua Dulce, Texas
- City
- Interactive map of Agua Dulce, Texas
- Coordinates: 27°46′57″N 97°54′39″W
- Country: United States
- State: Texas
- Counties: Nueces

Area
  - Total: 0.34 sq mi (0.88 km^{2})
  - Land: 0.34 sq mi (0.88 km^{2})
  - Water: 0 sq mi (0.00 km^{2})
- Elevation: 16 ft (5 m)

Population (2020)
  - Total: 685
  - Density: 2,348.5/sq mi (906.77/km^{2})
- Time zone: UTC-6 (Central (CST))
  - Summer (DST): UTC-5 (CDT)
- ZIP codes: 78330
- Area code: 361
- FIPS code: 48-01396
- GNIS feature ID: 2409667

Agua Dulce (/ɑːwəˈdulsɪ/ ah-wə-DOOL-sih) is a city in Nueces County, in the U.S. state of Texas. It is located on the Texas Mexican Railway at the intersection of State Highway 44 and Farm to Market Road 70 in west-central Nueces County. The name, Spanish for "sweet water", refers to a nearby creek and The Battle of Agua Dulce Creek was a major battle in the Mexican-American War. A town in Texas, Sweetwater in Nolan County in West Texas, uses the English name.

The town was established by the 1900s.

The population of Agua Dulce was 685 in the 2020 census.

== Geography ==
Agua Dulce is located at 27°46′59″N 97°54′36″W (27.783077, –97.910033). According to the United States Census Bureau, the city has a total area of 0.3 square miles (0.78 km^{2}), all land.

== Demographics ==
Historical population
Census	Pop.	Note	%±
1950	660		—
1960	867		31.4%
1970	742		−14.4%
1980	934		25.9%
1990	794		−15.0%
2000	737		−7.2%
2010	812		10.2%
2020	685		−15.6%
U.S. Decennial Census

=== 2020 census ===
As of the 2020 census, Agua Dulce had a population of 685. The median age was 40.1 years. 24.8% of residents were under the age of 18 and 16.6% of residents were 65 years of age or older. For every 100 females there were 102.7 males, and for every 100 females age 18 and over there were 93.6 males age 18 and over.

0% of residents lived in urban areas, while 100.0% lived in rural areas.

There were 239 households in Agua Dulce, of which 45.2% had children under the age of 18 living in them. Of all households, 49.4% were married-couple households, 15.9% were households with a male householder and no spouse or partner present, and 28.9% were households with a female householder and no spouse or partner present. About 18.4% of all households were made up of individuals and 11.3% had someone living alone who was 65 years of age or older.

There were 260 housing units, of which 8.1% were vacant. Among occupied housing units, 82.8% were owner-occupied and 17.2% were renter-occupied. The homeowner vacancy rate was 1.0% and the rental vacancy rate was 6.7%.

Racial composition as of the 2020 census
Race	Percent
White	58.0%
Black or African American	0.6%
American Indian and Alaska Native	0%
Asian	0.3%
Native Hawaiian and Other Pacific Islander	0%
Some other race	17.5%
Two or more races	23.6%
Hispanic or Latino (of any race)	80.7%

Agua Dulce racial composition as of 2020 (NH = Non-Hispanic) (Note: Note: the US Census treats Hispanic/Latino as an ethnic category. This table excludes Latinos from the racial categories and assigns them to a separate category. Hispanics/Latinos can be of any race.)
Race	Number	Percentage
White (NH)	126	18.39%
Some Other Race (NH)	1	0.15%
Mixed/Multi-Racial (NH)	5	0.73%
Hispanic or Latino	553	80.73%
Total	685	

As of the 2020 United States census, there were 685 people, 219 households, and 165 families residing in the city.

=== 2000 Census data ===
As of the census of 2000, 737 people, 234 households, and 200 families were residing in the city. Its population density was 2,338.1 inhabitants per square mile (902.7/km^{2}). The 257 housing units averaged 815.3 per mi^{2} (310.1/km^{2}). The racial makeup of the city was 79.38% White, 0.14% African American, 0.68% Native American, 16.15% from other races, and 3.66% from two or more races. Hispanics or Latinos of any race were 66.08% of the population.

Of the 234 households, 46.6% had children under the age of 18 living with them, 66.7% were married couples living together, 15.8% had a female householder with no husband present, and 14.5% were not families. About 12.4% of all households were made up of individuals, and 7.3% had someone living alone who was 65 years of age or older. The average household size was 3.15, and the average family size was 3.46.

In the city, the age distribution was 32.2% under 18, 10.4% from 18 to 24, 25.5% from 25 to 44, 21.4% from 45 to 64, and 10.4% who were 65 years of age or older. The median age was 32 years. For every 100 females, there were 94.5 males. For every 100 females age 18 and over, there were 89.4 males. The median income for a household in the city was $31,406, and for a family was $33,750. Males had a median income of $27,375 versus $18,875 for females. The per capita income for the city was $10,847. About 22.0% of families and 25.2% of the population were below the poverty line, including 31.0% of those under age 18 and 21.0% of those age 65 or over.

== Education ==
Agua Dulce is served by the Agua Dulce Independent School District, and home to the Agua Dulce Longhorns.

Del Mar College is the designated community college for all of Nueces County.

== Mention in The Front Porch Song ==
Agua Dulce is mentioned twice in "The Front Porch Song" by American musician Robert Earl Keen, written with Lyle Lovett, his roommate when it was written. The mention of the town is explained by Keen, "My Uncle Spruce has a 160-acre ranchito near Agua Dulce. He owned five Hereford cows and one beautiful (classic ranch type) Hereford bull, named Sonny Boy."

== See also ==
- Battle of Agua Dulce
