= North San Pedro, Texas =

- CDP
- Coordinates: 27°48′10″N 97°40′59″W
- Country: United States
- State: Texas
- County: Nueces

Area
  - Total: 0.12 sq mi (0.3 km^{2})
  - Land: 0.12 sq mi (0.3 km^{2})
  - Water: 0 sq mi (0.0 km^{2})
- Elevation: 79 ft (24 m)

Population (2020)
  - Total: 735
  - Density: 6,300/sq mi (2,500/km^{2})
- Time zone: UTC-6 (Central (CST))
  - Summer (DST): UTC-5 (CDT)
- FIPS code: 48-52404
- GNIS feature ID: 1867557

North San Pedro is a census-designated place (CDP) in Nueces County, Texas, United States. The population was 735 at the 2020 census, down from 895 at the 2010 census.

== Geography ==
North San Pedro is located at 27°48′10″N 97°40′59″W (27.802670, -97.682970).

According to the United States Census Bureau, the CDP has a total area of 0.1 square miles (0.26 km^{2}), all land.

== Demographics ==
Historical population
Census	Pop.	Note	%±
2000	920		—
2010	895		−2.7%
2020	735		−17.9%
U.S. Decennial Census; 1850–1900 1910; 1920 1930 1940; 1950 1960 1970; 1980 1990 2000; 2010 2020

North San Pedro first appeared as a census designated place in the 1980 United States census.

=== 2020 census ===
North San Pedro CDP, Texas – Racial and ethnic composition Note: the US Census treats Hispanic/Latino as an ethnic category. This table excludes Latinos from the racial categories and assigns them to a separate category. Hispanics/Latinos may be of any race.
Race / Ethnicity (NH = Non-Hispanic)	Pop 2000	Pop 2010	Pop 2020	% 2000	% 2010	% 2020
White alone (NH)	11	13	20	1.20%	1.45%	2.72%
Black or African American alone (NH)	0	0	0	0.00%	0.00%	0.00%
Native American or Alaska Native alone (NH)	1	1	0	0.11%	0.11%	0.00%
Asian alone (NH)	0	0	6	0.00%	0.00%	0.82%
Native Hawaiian or Pacific Islander alone (NH)	0	0	0	0.00%	0.00%	0.00%
Other race alone (NH)	0	1	0	0.00%	0.11%	0.00%
Mixed race or Multiracial (NH)	0	0	1	0.00%	0.00%	0.14%
Hispanic or Latino (any race)	908	880	708	98.70%	98.32%	96.33%
Total	920	895	735	100.00%	100.00%	100.00%

=== 2000 census ===
As of the census of 2000, there were 920 people, 257 households, and 219 families residing in the CDP. The population density was 9,025.6 inhabitants per square mile (3,484.8/km^{2}). There were 290 housing units at an average density of 2,845.0 per square mile (1,098.5/km^{2}). The racial makeup of the CDP was 62.61% White, 0.98% Native American, 32.39% from other races, and 4.02% from two or more races. Hispanic or Latino of any race were 98.70% of the population.

There were 257 households, out of which 40.1% had children under the age of 18 living with them, 58.0% were married couples living together, 20.6% had a female householder with no husband present, and 14.4% were non-families. 11.7% of all households were made up of individuals, and 5.8% had someone living alone who was 65 years of age or older. The average household size was 3.58 and the average family size was 3.89.

In the CDP, the population was spread out, with 33.5% under the age of 18, 12.4% from 18 to 24, 24.8% from 25 to 44, 18.2% from 45 to 64, and 11.2% who were 65 years of age or older. The median age was 28 years. For every 100 females, there were 91.3 males. For every 100 females age 18 and over, there were 91.8 males.

The median income for a household in the CDP was $21,797, and the median income for a family was $22,440. Males had a median income of $18,875 versus $10,893 for females. The per capita income for the CDP was $12,423. About 28.9% of families and 27.5% of the population were below the poverty line, including 33.1% of those under age 18 and 39.6% of those age 65 or over.

== Education ==
It is in the Robstown Independent School District.

Del Mar College is the designated community college for all of Nueces County.
