= Agua Dulce Independent School District =

School district in Texas, United States

Location
- 1 Longhorn Dr. Agua Dulce, Texas ESC Region 2 USA
- Coordinates: 27°47′8″N 97°54′48″W

District information
- Type: Independent school district
- Motto: "HOME OF THE FIGHTING LONGHORNS"
- Grades: Pre-K through 12
- Established: 1910
- Superintendent: Nora T. Lopez (Temp. Superintendent )
- Schools: 2 (2009-18)
- NCES District ID: 4807530

Students and staff
- Students: 345 (2010-11)
- Teachers: 29 (2009-10) (on full-time equivalent (FTE) basis)
- Student–teacher ratio: 11.9 (2009-10)
- Athletic conference: UIL Class 1A Football Division II
- District mascot: Longhorns
- Colors: Maroon, White

Other information
- TEA District Accountability Rating for 2011-12: Academically Acceptable
- Website: Agua Dulce ISD

Agua Dulce Independent School District is a public school district based in the community of Agua Dulce, Texas (USA). The district serves students in west central Nueces, and east central Jim Wells counties. Within Nueces County it includes Agua Dulce and half of Rancho Banquete.

== History ==
In 1910 the Agua Dulce Independent School District was founded; Sophinia Thompson was the first teacher. The school system was consolidated with that of Bentonville in 1932.

In 1949 the school boards of Jim Wells and Nueces counties stated that Agua Dulce ISD could annex a 9 square miles (23 km^{2}) area that was in Banquete ISD. Four entities that owned property in the area filed a lawsuit. In 1950 28th District Court Judge Paul A. Martineau stated that the annexation could go forward.

== Finances ==
As of the 2010-2011 school year, the appraised valuation of property in the district was $128,302,000. The maintenance tax rate was $0.117 and the bond tax rate was $0.021 per $100 of appraised valuation.

== Academic achievement ==
In 2011, the school district was rated "academically acceptable" by the Texas Education Agency. Forty-nine percent of districts in Texas in 2011 received the same rating. No state accountability ratings will be given to districts in 2012. A school district in Texas can receive one of four possible rankings from the Texas Education Agency: Exemplary (the highest possible ranking), Recognized, Academically Acceptable, and Academically Unacceptable (the lowest possible ranking).

Historical district TEA accountability ratings

- 2011: Academically Acceptable
- 2010: Academically Acceptable
- 2009: Academically Acceptable
- 2008: Academically Acceptable
- 2007: Academically Acceptable
- 2006: Academically Acceptable
- 2005: Academically Acceptable
- 2004: Academically Acceptable

== Schools ==
In the 2011-2012 school year, the district operated two schools.

- Agua Dulce High School (Grades 6-12)
- Agua Dulce Elementary (Grades PK-5)

== See also ==
- List of school districts in Texas
- List of high schools in Texas
