= Sandy Hollow-Escondidas, Texas =

- CDP
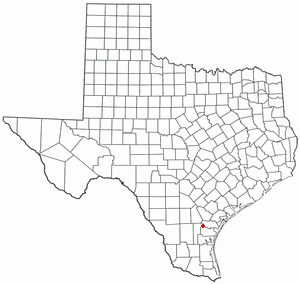
- Location of Sandy Hollow-Escondidas, Texas

- Coordinates: 27°56′50″N 97°49′14″W
- Country: United States
- State: Texas
- County: Nueces

Area
  - Total: 8.2 sq mi (21.2 km^{2})
  - Land: 8.0 sq mi (20.7 km^{2})
  - Water: 0.19 sq mi (0.5 km^{2})

Population (2020)
  - Total: 342
  - Density: 42.8/sq mi (16.5/km^{2})
- Time zone: UTC-6 (Central (CST))
  - Summer (DST): UTC-5 (CDT)
- FIPS code: 48-65342

Sandy Hollow-Escondidas is a census-designated place (CDP) in Nueces County, Texas, United States. The population was 342 at the 2020 census, up from 296 at the 2010 census.

== Geography ==
Sandy Hollow-Escondidas is located at 27°56′50″N 97°49′14″W (27.947197, -97.820581).

According to the United States Census Bureau, the CDP has a total area of 8.2 square miles (21 km^{2}), of which 8.0 square miles (21 km^{2}) is land and 0.2 square miles (0.52 km^{2}) (2.44%) is water.

== Demographics ==
Historical population
Census	Pop.	Note	%±
2000	433		—
2010	296		−31.6%
2020	342		15.5%
U.S. Decennial Census; 1850–1900 1910; 1920 1930 1940; 1950 1960 1970; 1980 1990 2000; 2010 2020

Sandy Hollow-Escondidas first appeared as a census designated place in the 2000 U.S. census.

=== 2020 census ===
Sandy Hollow-Escondidas CDP, Texas – Racial and ethnic composition Note: the US Census treats Hispanic/Latino as an ethnic category. This table excludes Latinos from the racial categories and assigns them to a separate category. Hispanics/Latinos may be of any race.
Race / Ethnicity (NH = Non-Hispanic)	Pop 2000	Pop 2010	Pop 2020	% 2000	% 2010	% 2020
White alone (NH)	192	114	148	44.34%	38.51%	43.27%
Black or African American alone (NH)	0	5	4	0.00%	1.69%	1.17%
Native American or Alaska Native alone (NH)	1	1	0	0.23%	0.34%	0.00%
Asian alone (NH)	0	0	0	0.00%	0.00%	0.00%
Native Hawaiian or Pacific Islander alone (NH)	0	0	0	0.00%	0.00%	0.00%
Other race alone (NH)	0	0	0	0.00%	0.00%	0.00%
Mixed race or Multiracial (NH)	5	0	14	1.15%	0.00%	4.09%
Hispanic or Latino (any race)	235	176	176	54.27%	59.46%	51.46%
Total	433	296	342	100.00%	100.00%	100.00%

=== 2000 census ===
As of the census of 2000, there were 433 people, 150 households, and 111 families residing in the CDP. The population density was 54.2 inhabitants per square mile (20.9/km^{2}). There were 203 housing units at an average density of 25.4/sq mi (9.8/km^{2}). The racial makeup of the CDP was 80.60% White, 0.23% African American, 0.23% Native American, 13.39% from other races, and 5.54% from two or more races. Hispanic or Latino of any race were 54.27% of the population.

There were 150 households, out of which 34.7% had children under the age of 18 living with them, 56.7% were married couples living together, 12.7% had a female householder with no husband present, and 26.0% were non-families. 20.0% of all households were made up of individuals, and 10.0% had someone living alone who was 65 years of age or older. The average household size was 2.89 and the average family size was 3.41.

In the CDP, the population was spread out, with 29.6% under the age of 18, 5.1% from 18 to 24, 27.3% from 25 to 44, 25.9% from 45 to 64, and 12.2% who were 65 years of age or older. The median age was 37 years. For every 100 females, there were 104.2 males. For every 100 females age 18 and over, there were 100.7 males.

The median income for a household in the CDP was $40,469, and the median income for a family was $40,938. Males had a median income of $28,125 versus $19,821 for females. The per capita income for the CDP was $14,458. About 14.5% of families and 16.5% of the population were below the poverty line, including 15.7% of those under age 18 and 10.4% of those age 65 or over.

== Education ==
The community is within the Banquete Independent School District.

Del Mar College is the designated community college for all of Nueces County.
