= Bishop Consolidated Independent School District =

School district in Texas, United States

Coordinates: 27°34′52″N 97°47′27″W

Location
- Bishop, Texas ESC Region 2 USA

District information
- Type: Independent school district
- Grades: Pre-K through 12
- Superintendent: Christina Gutierrez
- Schools: 6 (2009-10)
- NCES District ID: 4810260

Students and staff
- Students: 1,237 (2010-11)
- Teachers: 89.15 (2009-10) (on full-time equivalent (FTE) basis)
- Student–teacher ratio: 13.76 (2009-10)
- Athletic conference: UIL Class 2A Football Division I
- District mascot: Badgers
- Colors: Kelly Green, Gold

Other information
- TEA District Accountability Rating for 2011: Recognized
- Website: www.bishopcisd.net

Bishop Consolidated Independent School District is a public school district based in the town of Bishop, in Nueces County, Texas (USA). In addition to Bishop, the district also serves the city of Petronila, a small section of Tierra Grande, and a small section of La Paloma-Lost Creek.

== Finances ==
As of the 2010–2011 school year, the appraised valuation of property in the district was $462,993,000. The maintenance tax rate was $0.104 and the bond tax rate was $0.052 per $100 of appraised valuation.

== Academic achievement ==
In 2011, the school district was rated "recognized" by the Texas Education Agency.

== Schools ==
In the 2011–2012 school year, the district opened six schools.

Regular instructional

- Bishop High School (Grades 9-12)
- Lillion E. Luehrs Junior High (Grades 6-8)
- Bishop Elementary (Grades 3-5)
- Petronila Elementary (Grades PK-5)
- Bishop Primary (Grades PK-2)

Alternative instructional

- Nueces County JJAEP (Grades 6-12)

== See also ==
- List of school districts in Texas
