= West Oso Independent School District =

School district in Texas, United States

Location
- Corpus Christi, TX ESC Region 2 USA

District information
- Type: Public
- Grades: Pre-K through 12
- Superintendent: Kimberly Moore

Students and staff
- Athletic conference: UIL Class AAAA
- District mascot: bear
- Colors: black and red

Other information
- Website: www.westosoisd.net

West Oso Independent School District is a public school district in Nueces County, Texas (USA). Over 1,900 students are enrolled in West Oso schools.

In addition to a section of Corpus Christi, the district includes most of Tierra Grande.

In 2009, the school district was rated "academically unacceptable" by the Texas Education Agency.

== Schools ==
- West Oso High School (Grades 9-12)
- West Oso Junior High School (Grades 6-8)
- West Oso Elementary School (Grades 2-5)
- John F. Kennedy Elementary School (Grades PK-1)

== Background ==
The West Oso School District has its origins in the original Oso School, founded in the 1890s in Oso Community (near Oso Creek, between state highway 44 and Old Brownsville Road). The first schoolhouse was a one-room sheepherder's shack on land owned by Henry Davis Allen, Jr. (brother of Calvin Joseph [Cal] Allen, for whom the nearby Calallen Independent School District is named). In 1967 the Oso School District merged with the West Point School District to create the West Oso Independent School District.
