= Richard M. Borchard Regional Fairgrounds =

Coordinates: 27.791°N 97.646°W

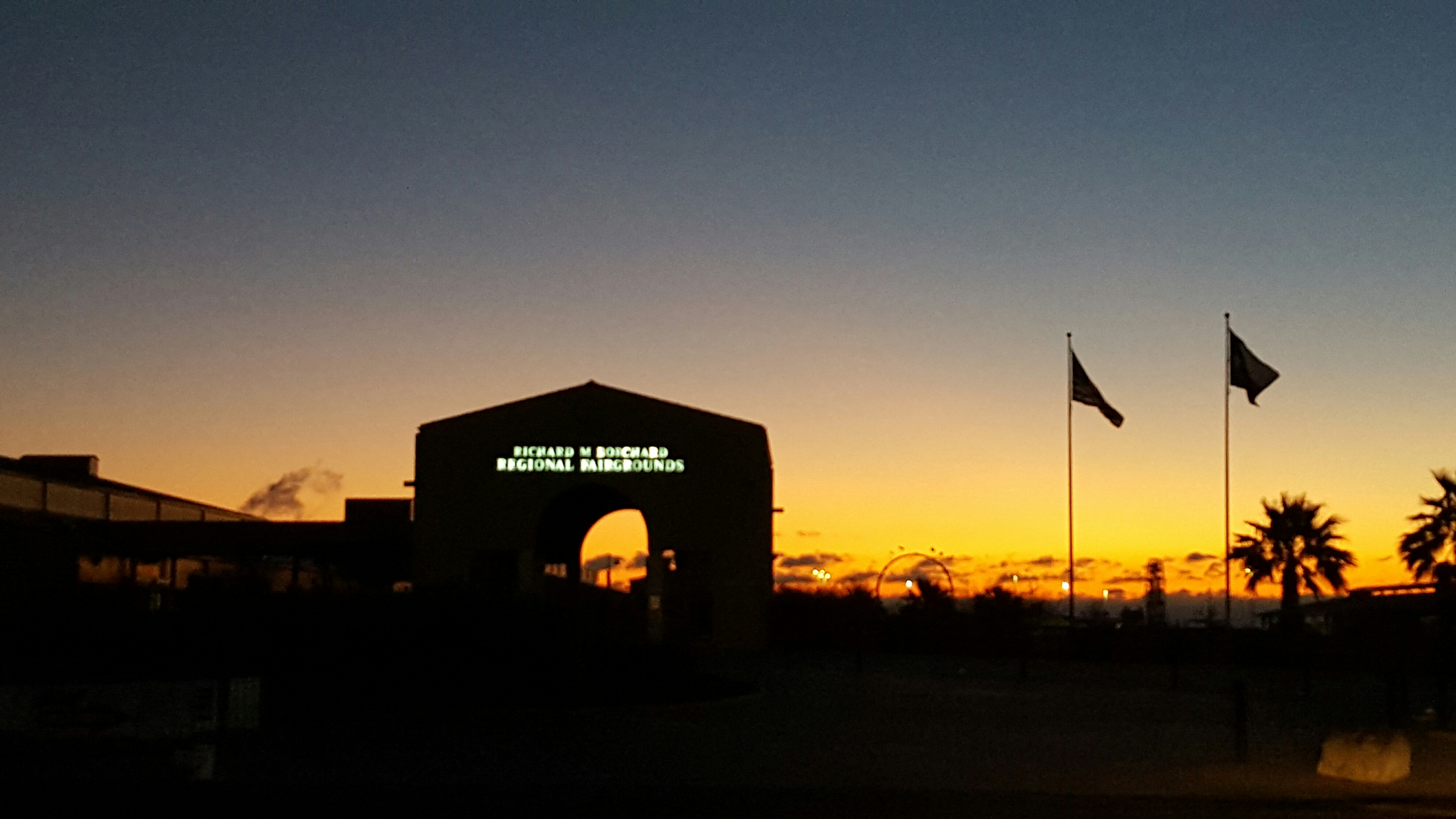
Sun rising over the fairgrounds

The Richard M. Borchard Regional Fairgrounds is a public works project in Nueces County, Texas. Work began on the Richard M. Borchards Fairgrounds in 2005 despite having been the subject of a failed bond proposal in 1999.

It is the home to the Nueces County Junior Livestock Show which is called "The greatest junior livestock show". On December 19, 2019, Hurricane Alley Roller Derby (H.A.R.D.) announced that they were moving to the RMB Fairgrounds as their home rink for their 2019 season. The fairgrounds annually hosts around 200 events each year ranging from weddings to boxing events and rodeos. The Fairgrounds are owned by Nueces County, TX and managed by Spectra.

== Facilities ==
Conference Center holds the main offices, two ballrooms, three meeting rooms, and a conference room. the Grand Ballroom is one of the largest ballrooms in the coastal bend with the ability to hold a banquet with about 1,000 guests.

Marvin and Laura Berry Pavilion (Formal Central Pavilion Arena) is a 2,000 seat, 35,000 sq ft arena. It hosts the judging and auction of the Nueces County Junior Livestock Show, concerts, boxing, wrestling, banquets, trade shows, and is the main meeting area for the Coastal Bend Hurricane conference. Air Conditioned indoor pavilion; can accommodate equestrian shows, rodeos, livestock events, family shows, boxing, wrestling, concerts, indoor football other stage events. On January 7, 2019, the arena changed names from the Central Pavilion Arena, to the Marvin and Laura Berry Pavilion in honor of Marvin and Laura Berry who own Berry LTD, and are one of the largest donors to the Nueces County Junior Livestock Show.

Exhibit Halls A & B are both 40,000 square foot, column free exhibit buildings used for various trade shows including car, boat, farm, and hunting & fishing shows and similar exhibition events, as well as animal exhibitions.

Equestrian Center has an arena with a 45,000 square foot dirt floor, seating for 1,000 with portable bleachers able to bring its size up to 2,000. Two warm-up rings that are also 45,000 square feet in size each. And a horse barn that has 105 stalls.
