= Tierra Grande, Texas =

- CDP
- Coordinates: 27°41′44″N 97°34′47″W
- Country: United States
- State: Texas
- County: Nueces

Area
  - Total: 4.7 sq mi (12.2 km^{2})
  - Land: 4.7 sq mi (12.2 km^{2})
  - Water: 0 sq mi (0.0 km^{2})
- Elevation: 56 ft (17 m)

Population (2020)
  - Total: 303
  - Density: 64.3/sq mi (24.8/km^{2})
- Time zone: UTC-6 (Central (CST))
  - Summer (DST): UTC-5 (CDT)
- FIPS code: 48-72952
- GNIS feature ID: 1852773

Tierra Grande is a census-designated place (CDP) in Nueces County, Texas, United States. The population was 303 at the 2020 census, down from 403 in 2010.

== Geography ==
Tierra Grande is located at 27°41′44″N 97°34′47″W (27.695622, -97.579631).

According to the United States Census Bureau, the CDP has a total area of 4.7 square miles (12 km^{2}), all land.

== Demographics ==
Historical population
Census	Pop.	Note	%±
2000	362		—
2010	403		11.3%
2020	303		−24.8%
U.S. Decennial Census; 1850–1900 1910; 1920 1930 1940; 1950 1960 1970; 1980 1990 2000; 2010 2020

Tierra Grande first appeared as a census designated place in the 2000 U.S. census.

=== 2020 census ===
Tierra Grande CDP, Texas – Racial and ethnic composition Note: the US Census treats Hispanic/Latino as an ethnic category. This table excludes Latinos from the racial categories and assigns them to a separate category. Hispanics/Latinos may be of any race.
Race / Ethnicity (NH = Non-Hispanic)	Pop 2000	Pop 2010	Pop 2020	% 2000	% 2010	% 2020
White alone (NH)	67	63	50	18.51%	15.63%	16.50%
Black or African American alone (NH)	5	6	0	1.38%	1.49%	0.00%
Native American or Alaska Native alone (NH)	1	1	0	0.28%	0.25%	0.00%
Asian alone (NH)	1	0	0	0.28%	0.00%	0.00%
Native Hawaiian or Pacific Islander alone (NH)	0	0	0	0.00%	0.00%	0.00%
Other race alone (NH)	0	0	0	0.00%	0.00%	0.00%
Mixed race or Multiracial (NH)	1	1	1	0.28%	0.25%	0.33%
Hispanic or Latino (any race)	287	332	252	79.28%	82.38%	83.17%
Total	362	403	303	100.00%	100.00%	100.00%

=== 2000 census ===
As of the census of 2000, there were 362 people, 105 households, and 80 families residing in the CDP. The population density was 76.9 inhabitants per square mile (29.7/km^{2}). There were 116 housing units at an average density of 24.6/sq mi (9.5/km^{2}). The racial makeup of the CDP was 57.18% White, 1.38% African American, 1.66% Native American, 0.28% Asian, 0.28% Pacific Islander, 37.29% from other races, and 1.93% from two or more races. Hispanic or Latino of any race were 79.28% of the population.

There were 105 households, out of which 46.7% had children under the age of 18 living with them, 64.8% were married couples living together, 6.7% had a female householder with no husband present, and 22.9% were non-families. 17.1% of all households were made up of individuals, and 5.7% had someone living alone who was 65 years of age or older. The average household size was 3.45 and the average family size was 3.96.

In the CDP, the population was spread out, with 33.4% under the age of 18, 11.9% from 18 to 24, 29.6% from 25 to 44, 17.7% from 45 to 64, and 7.5% who were 65 years of age or older. The median age was 29 years. For every 100 females, there were 101.1 males. For every 100 females age 18 and over, there were 99.2 males.

The median income for a household in the CDP was $35,875, and the median income for a family was $36,750. Males had a median income of $21,071 versus $20,833 for females. The per capita income for the CDP was $17,686. About 15.7% of families and 22.7% of the population were below the poverty line, including 29.9% of those under age 18 and 7.1% of those age 65 or over.

== Education ==
The community is divided mostly within West Oso Independent School District, with a small portion in Bishop Consolidated Independent School District. West Oso High School is the high school of the former.

Del Mar College is the designated community college for all of Nueces County.
