= Rancho Banquete, Texas =

- CDP
- Coordinates: 27°48′39″N 97°50′4″W
- Country: United States
- State: Texas
- County: Nueces

Area
  - Total: 2.9 sq mi (7.4 km^{2})
  - Land: 2.9 sq mi (7.4 km^{2})
  - Water: 0 sq mi (0.0 km^{2})
- Elevation: 92 ft (28 m)

Population (2020)
  - Total: 459
  - Density: 160/sq mi (62/km^{2})
- Time zone: UTC-6 (Central (CST))
  - Summer (DST): UTC-5 (CDT)
- FIPS code: 48-60529
- GNIS feature ID: 1852756

Rancho Banquete is a census-designated place (CDP) in Nueces County, Texas, United States. The population was 459 at the 2020 census, down from 424 at the 2010 census.

== Geography ==
Rancho Banquete is located at 27°48′39″N 97°50′4″W (27.810720, -97.834404).

According to the United States Census Bureau, the CDP has a total area of 2.8 square miles (7.3 km^{2}), all land.

== Demographics ==
Historical population
Census	Pop.	Note	%±
2000	469		—
2010	424		−9.6%
2020	459		8.3%
U.S. Decennial Census; 1850–1900 1910; 1920 1930 1940; 1950 1960 1970; 1980 1990 2000; 2010 2020

Rancho Banquete first appeared as a census designated place in the 2000 U.S. census.

=== 2020 census ===
Rancho Banquete CDP, Texas – Racial and ethnic composition Note: the US Census treats Hispanic/Latino as an ethnic category. This table excludes Latinos from the racial categories and assigns them to a separate category. Hispanics/Latinos may be of any race.
Race / Ethnicity (NH = Non-Hispanic)	Pop 2000	Pop 2010	Pop 2020	% 2000	% 2010	% 2020
White alone (NH)	25	22	17	5.33%	5.19%	3.70%
Black or African American alone (NH)	3	1	1	0.64%	0.24%	0.22%
Native American or Alaska Native alone (NH)	1	0	0	0.21%	0.00%	0.00%
Asian alone (NH)	3	1	0	0.64%	0.24%	0.00%
Native Hawaiian or Pacific Islander alone (NH)	0	0	0	0.00%	0.00%	0.00%
Other race alone (NH)	0	0	0	0.00%	0.00%	0.00%
Mixed race or Multiracial (NH)	1	2	6	0.21%	0.47%	1.31%
Hispanic or Latino (any race)	436	398	435	92.96%	93.87%	94.77%
Total	469	424	459	100.00%	100.00%	100.00%

=== 2000 census ===
As of the census of 2000, there were 469 people, 118 households, and 111 families residing in the CDP. The population density was 164.6 inhabitants per square mile (63.6/km^{2}). There were 128 housing units at an average density of 44.9 per square mile (17.3/km^{2}). The racial makeup of the CDP was 71.64% White, 0.64% African American, 1.28% Native American, 0.64% Asian, 23.67% from other races, and 2.13% from two or more races. Hispanic or Latino of any race were 92.96% of the population.

There were 118 households, out of which 53.4% had children under the age of 18 living with them, 76.3% were married couples living together, 10.2% had a female householder with no husband present, and 5.9% were non-families. 5.9% of all households were made up of individuals, and 2.5% had someone living alone who was 65 years of age or older. The average household size was 3.97 and the average family size was 4.07.

In the CDP, the population was spread out, with 38.0% under the age of 18, 12.4% from 18 to 24, 27.9% from 25 to 44, 17.1% from 45 to 64, and 4.7% who were 65 years of age or older. The median age was 25 years. For every 100 females, there were 88.4 males. For every 100 females age 18 and over, there were 92.7 males.

The median income for a household in the CDP was $22,679, and the median income for a family was $22,679. Males had a median income of $20,625 versus $14,091 for females. The per capita income for the CDP was $7,739. About 29.1% of families and 31.7% of the population were below the poverty line, including 46.7% of those under age 18 and 100.0% of those age 65 or over.

== Education ==
Rancho Banquete is divided between the Agua Dulce Independent School District and the Banquete Independent School District.

Del Mar College is the designated community college for all of Nueces County.
