= West Oso High School =

Public school in Texas, United States

Location
- 754 Flato Rd; Corpus Christi, Texas 78405; USA; 27.76967°N 97.45948°W

Information
- Type: Public, Secondary
- Principal: Elodia Gutierrez
- Teaching staff: 39.2(FTE)
- Grades: 9–12
- Enrollment: 490 (2025–2026)
- Student to teacher ratio: 12.5
- Colors: Red and black
- Mascot: Bear
- Website: wohs.westosoisd.net

West Oso High School is a public school in Corpus Christi, Texas (USA). It is part of the West Oso Independent School District.

Located at 754 Flato Road, the school serves students in grades nine through twelve. The school mascot, the bear, is taken from the district's name, which is taken from nearby Oso Bay (Oso is Spanish for bear).

In addition to a section of Corpus Christi, the district includes most of Tierra Grande.

== Student demographics ==
As of the 2025-2026 school year, West Oso High school had a total of 490 students (88.4% Hispanic, 10.3% African American, 1% White, and .08% two or more races ). 94% of the students were considered economically disadvantaged, 10% received Special Ed services, and 11.4% were English Language Learners.

== 2025-26 Accountability rating ==
Based on the accountability ratings released by the Texas Education Agency in 2026, West Oso High is currently rated "Academically Acceptable".

== Athletics and UIL ==
West Oso High School takes great pride in the class, character, and dignity of their student athletes wherever they are. They are also a 4A division school and is governed by the University Interscholastic League (UIL).

WOHS offers 16 sports for their students:

Girls:

- Girls Basketball
- Girls Cheer
- Girls Cross Country
- Girls Golf
- Girls Tennis
- Girls Softball
- Girls Track
- Girls Volleyball

Boys:

- Baseball
- Boys Basketball
- Boys Cross Country
- Boys Golf
- Boys Tennis
- Boys Track
- Football

Other UIL activities are:

- Academics
- Marching Band
- Spirit
