= Tierra Verde, Texas =

- CDP
- Interactive map of Tierra Verde, Texas
- Coordinates: 27°45′42″N 97°43′03″W
- Country: United States
- State: Texas
- County: Nueces

Area
  - Total: 2.0 sq mi (5.2 km^{2})
  - Land: 2.0 sq mi (5.2 km^{2})
  - Water: 0 sq mi (0.0 km^{2})

Population (2010)
  - Total: 277
  - Density: 140/sq mi (53/km^{2})
- Time zone: UTC-6 (Central (CST))
  - Summer (DST): UTC-5 (CDT)
- Zip Code: 78380

Tierra Verde is a census-designated place (CDP) in Nueces County, Texas, United States. As of the 2020 census, Tierra Verde had a population of 298. Prior to the census, it was part of the Spring Garden-Terra Verde CDP.

== Geography ==
Tierra Verde is located at 27°45′42″N 97°43′3″W (27.761571, -97.717384). The CDP has a total area of 2.0 square miles (5.2 km^{2}), all land.

== Demographics ==
Historical population
Census	Pop.	Note	%±
2010	277		—
2020	298		7.6%
U.S. Decennial Census; 1850–1900 1910; 1920 1930 1940; 1950 1960 1970; 1980 1990 2000; 2010 2020

Tierra Verde first appeared as a census designated place in the 2010 U.S. census after the deleted Spring Garden-Terra Verde CDP was split into the Tierra Verde CDP and the Spring Gardens CDP.

Tierra Verde CDP, Texas – Racial and ethnic composition Note: the US Census treats Hispanic/Latino as an ethnic category. This table excludes Latinos from the racial categories and assigns them to a separate category. Hispanics/Latinos may be of any race.
Race / Ethnicity (NH = Non-Hispanic)	Pop 2010	Pop 2020	% 2010	% 2020
White alone (NH)	12	16	4.33%	5.37%
Black or African American alone (NH)	1	1	0.36%	0.34%
Native American or Alaska Native alone (NH)	0	1	0.00%	0.34%
Asian alone (NH)	0	0	0.00%	0.00%
Native Hawaiian or Pacific Islander alone (NH)	0	0	0.00%	0.00%
Other race alone (NH)	0	1	0.00%	0.34%
Mixed race or Multiracial (NH)	0	0	0.00%	0.00%
Hispanic or Latino (any race)	264	279	95.31%	93.62%
Total	277	298	100.00%	100.00%

== Education ==
It is in the Robstown Independent School District.

Del Mar College is the designated community college for all of Nueces County.
