= Aransas Pass Independent School District =

School district in Texas, United States

Location
- 748 W. Goodnight Ave. Aransas Pass, Texas ESC Region 2 USA
- Coordinates: 27°54′11″N 97°8′54″W

District information
- Type: Independent school district
- Motto: Purpose, Passion, Pride.
- Grades: Pre-K through 12
- Superintendent: Dr. Glenn Barnes
- Schools: 4 (2024-2025)
- NCES District ID: 4808580

Students and staff
- Students: 1,731 (2023-2024)
- Teachers: 112.90 (2023-2024) (on full-time equivalent (FTE) basis)
- Student–teacher ratio: 15.33 (2023-2024)
- Athletic conference: UIL Class 3A Football Division I
- District mascot: Panthers
- Colors: Purple, Gold

Other information
- TEA District Accountability Rating for 2023-2024: The issuance of 2024 A–F ratings remains pending and subject to change based on judicial rulings.
- Website: Aransas Pass ISD

Aransas Pass Independent School District is a public school district based in Aransas Pass, Texas (USA). Aransas Pass serves portions of Aransas, Nueces, and San Patricio counties, including most of the city of Aransas Pass.

In addition to sections of Aransas Pass, the district, within San Patricio County, includes a small portion of Ingleside. It also includes the former census-designated places of Country Acres and Falman (previously counted as Falman-County Acres). Country Acres and Falman both became parts of the City of Aransas Pass. In Aransas County it also includes a small section of Rockport.

The district operates one high school, Aransas Pass High School.

== Finances ==
As of the 2024-2025 school year, the appraised valuation of property in the district was $1,359,586,624. The maintenance tax rate was $0.6723 and the bond tax rate was $0.1365 per $100 of appraised valuation.

== Academic achievement ==
The issuance of 2023 and 2024 A–F ratings remains pending and subject to change based on judicial rulings. As of 2024, a school district in Texas can receive one of six possible rankings from the Texas Education Agency: A, B, C, D, F, or Not Rated.

Historical district TEA accountability ratings

- 2022: C
- 2021: Not Rated: Declared State of Disaster
- 2020: Not Rated: Declared State of Disaster
- 2019: B
- 2018: Not Rated: Harvey Provision

== Schools ==
In the 2024-2025 school year, the district had students in four schools.

Regular instructional

- Aransas Pass High School (Grades 9-12)
- A.C. Blunt Middle School (Grades 6-8)
- Charlie Marshall Elementary School (Grades 3-5)
- H.T. Faulk Elementary School (Grades PK-2)

Alternative instructional

- Aransas Pass JJAEP (Grades 6-12)

== Athletics ==
Aransas Pass High School participates in the boys sports of football, cross country, basketball, powerlifting, baseball, track and field, tennis, and golf. The school participates in the girls sports of volleyball, cross country, basketball, softball, track and field, tennis, and golf. In 1998 the Panther football team was 3A division 2 state semifinalist.

== See also ==
- List of school districts in Texas
- List of high schools in Texas
