= Port Aransas Independent School District =

School district in Texas, United States

Address
- 100 South Station Street Port Aransas, Texas, 78373; United States

District information
- Grades: PK–12
- Schools: 3
- NCES District ID: 4835370

Students and staff
- Students: 527 (2023–2024)
- Teachers: 50.37 (on an FTE basis)
- Student–teacher ratio: 10.46:1

Other information
- Website: www.paisd.net

Port Aransas Independent School District is a public school district based in Port Aransas, Texas (USA). Located in Nueces County, a small portion of the district extends into Aransas County.

Within Nueces County the district includes Port Aransas and sections of Aransas Pass and Corpus Christi. In Aransas County it serves additional sections of Aransas Pass.

The district has an elementary school, middle school and high school.

== Schools ==
Port Aransas ISD has three campuses – Port Aransas High (Grades 9-12), Brundrett Middle (grades 6–8), and H.G. Olsen Elementary (grades PK–5). All three are located within two blocks of each other on 100 South Station Street.

In 2009, the school district was rated "recognized" by the Texas Education Agency. Port Aransas High School has a student to teacher ratio of 10:3.

The Port Aransas High School mascot is Marly the Marlin and the teams are the "Fighting Marlins" for boys teams and "Lady Marlins" for the girls. Port Aransas High School does not have a football or volleyball team, unlike many Public Texas High Schools. Competing in Texas' University Interscholastic League (UIL) in 2A, Port Aransas High School offers six varsity sports for boys and girls: basketball, baseball/softball, track and field, tennis, golf, and cross country.
