= Banquete Independent School District =

School district in Texas, United States

Location
- Banquete, Texas ESC Region 2 USA
- Coordinates: 27°48′21″N 97°47′45″W

District information
- Type: Independent school district
- Grades: Pre-K through 12
- Superintendent: Dr Max Thompson
- Schools: 4 (2009-10)
- NCES District ID: 4809410

Students and staff
- Students: 795 (2010-11)
- Teachers: 65.00 (2009-10) (on full-time equivalent (FTE) basis)
- Student–teacher ratio: 12.85 (2009-10)
- Athletic conference: UIL Class 3A Football Division II
- District mascot: Bulldogs
- Colors: Green, White

Other information
- TEA District Accountability Rating for 2011: Recognized
- Website: Banquete ISD

Banquete Independent School District is a public school district based in the community of Banquete, Texas, United States.

It includes Banquete, Sandy Hollow-Escondidas, and half of Rancho Banquete.

== History ==
Education in the Banquete area dates back to the nineteenth century. A one-room school operated in the community as early as the 1870s, serving local students until 1917, when several nearby schools including Maria, Schroeder, and Leona were integrated with the Banquete school.

In 1949 the school boards of Jim Wells and Nueces counties stated that Agua Dulce ISD could annex a 9 square miles (23 km^{2}) area that was in Banquete ISD. Four entities that owned property in the area filed a lawsuit. In 1950 28th District Court Judge Paul A. Martineau stated that the annexation could go forward.

In May 2024, voters approved a $48.4 million bond measure to fund improvements to district facilities. The bond program included construction of a new middle school campus and other upgrades intended to address old infrastructure and support future enrollment needs in the district.

In February 2026, Banquete Independent School District began demolishing its historic elementary school building, which had originally been constructed in 1938, to clear space for the new junior high school campus funded through the 2024 bond program.

== Finances ==
As of the 2010–2011 school year, the appraised valuation of property in the district was $263,532,000. The maintenance tax rate was $0.104 and the bond tax rate was $0.043 per $100 of appraised valuation.

== Academic achievement ==
In 2011, the school district was rated "recognized" by the Texas Education Agency.

== Schools ==
In the 2011–2012 school year, the district had four schools.

=== Regular instruction ===
- Banquete High School (grades 9–12)
- Banquete Junior High School (grades 6–8)
- Banquete Elementary School (prekindergarten - grade 5)

=== Alternative instruction ===
- Banquete JJAEP

== See also ==
- List of school districts in Texas
