= Robstown Independent School District =

School district in Texas, United States

Address
- 801 North 1st Street Robstown, Texas, 78380; United States

District information
- Grades: PK–12
- Schools: 5
- NCES District ID: 4837440

Students and staff
- Students: 2,508 (2023–2024)
- Teachers: 155.83 (on an FTE basis)
- Student–teacher ratio: 16.09:1

Other information
- Website: www.robstownisd.org

Robstown Independent School District is a public school district based in Robstown, Texas, USA.

In addition to Robstown, the district also serves the census-designated places of North San Pedro, Spring Gardens, and Tierra Verde, as well as most of La Paloma-Lost Creek. Spring Gardens and Terra Verde were formerly together in the Spring Garden-Terra Verde CDP.

In 2009, the school district was rated "academically acceptable" by the Texas Education Agency.

== Schools ==
=== Secondary ===
- Robstown Early College High School
- Salazar Crossroads Academy
- Seale Junior High School
- Ortiz Intermediate School

=== Elementary ===
- Robert Driscoll, Dr. Elementary School
- Lotspeich Elementary School
- San Pedro Elementary School

=== Prekindergarten ===
- Hattie Martin Early Childhood Center
