= Nueces County, Texas =

County in Texas, United States

- County
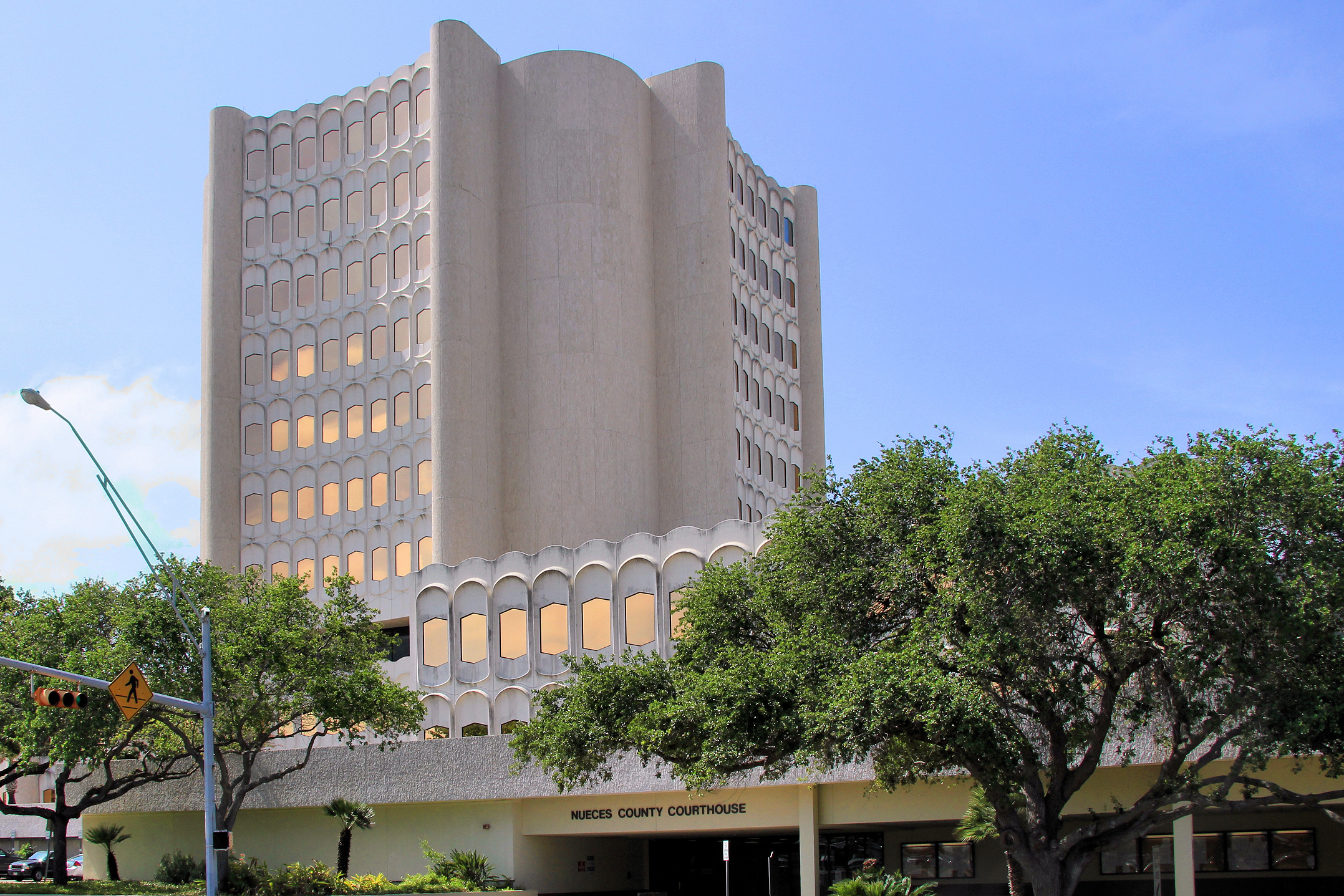
- The Nueces County Courthouse in Corpus Christi

- Seal

- Location within the U.S. state of Texas
- Coordinates: 27°44′N 97°31′W
- Country: United States
- State: Texas
- Founded: 1847
- Named for: Nueces River
- Seat: Corpus Christi
- Largest city: Corpus Christi

Area
  - Total: 1,166 sq mi (3,020 km^{2})
  - Land: 838 sq mi (2,170 km^{2})
  - Water: 327 sq mi (850 km^{2}) 28%

Population (2020)
  - Total: 353,178
  - Estimate (2025): 352,992 ▼
  - Density: 421/sq mi (163/km^{2})
- Time zone: UTC−6 (Central)
  - Summer (DST): UTC−5 (CDT)
- Congressional district: 27th
- Website: www.nuecesco.com

Nueces County (/njuˈeɪsɪs/ new-AY-siss) is located in the southern part of the U.S. state of Texas. As of the 2024 census, the population was 352,955, making it the 17th-most populous county in the state. The county seat is Corpus Christi, which is also the most populous city in the Nueces County, at 317,773 people, as of 2021. The county was formed in 1846 from portions of San Patricio County and organized the following year. It is named after the Nueces River, which marks the county's northwestern boundary with San Patricio County before emptying into its mouth at Nueces Bay north of the port of Corpus Christi. Nueces County is part of the Corpus Christi metropolitan area.

== Native Americans & history ==
Earliest signs of life in the county were estimated at 6,000 to 8,000 years ago. The earliest group were a culture named the Aransas. They were a nomadic group of hunter-gatherers, who had left the coastal region around 700–800 years ago, where the region remained uninhabited for about a century. The next group to migrate into the region were the Karankawa people, about 600 years ago, then being followed by other groups.

The area was disputed between Mexico and Texas, with Texas claiming the Rio Grande as the border and Mexico claiming the Nueces Strip as the border. The county was officially created on April 18, 1846, with Texas only gaining control over the county after the Treaty of Guadalupe Hidalgo.

The Indian tribes that lived in and raided the county were the Lipan Apache, Karankawa, Coahuiltecan, Kickapoo, and the Seminole. Relentless attacks from these tribes, along with its isolation and diseases, kept the counties population at a minimum in the counties beginning. The final recorded Indian raid in the county happened in April 1878, when Lipan Apache, Kickapoo, Seminole, Mexicans, and a white man briefly entered the county and onto ranches, before returning west to Laredo. Around this time, a band of Texas Rangers would clear out the outlaws that had embedded themselves into the Nueces Strip during the disputes between Texas and Mexico.

The county faced various trials and tribulations in its first few decades. It was only after the Civil War that the county began to see steady success, mainly due to Corpus Christi, which contributed value as a major shipping port. Another asset that contributed to the county's growth was a narrow-gauge railroad built in 1879 that went from San Diego to Laredo. As shipping became less consistent due to competition with railroading business, Corpus Christi shifted away from shipping to tourism.

In 1914, a plan for major developments throughout the county, including the construction of a gas plant, a garbage crematory, and the Nueces County Courthouse, was approved. This exceeded a budget of $1 million.

The 1919 Florida Keys hurricane had a dramatic impact on the county and caused extensive damage to Corpus Christi. News of the storm prompted anxiety and sympathy from other counties across the state.

In 1929, the League of United Latin American Citizens (LULAC) was founded, with the goal to end discrimination against Latinos in the United States. It has since shifted towards a staff-dominated organization focused on survival and continuity.

Prior to the opening of the Corpus Christi Harbor Bridge in 1959, multiple attempts to replace the existing bascule bridge failed, which included a proposal for a lift bridge that was rejected due to a toll feature.

== Geography ==
According to the U.S. Census Bureau, the county has an area of 1,166 square miles (3,020 km^{2}), of which 838 square miles (2,170 km^{2}) are land and 327 square miles (850 km^{2}) (28%) are covered by water. It borders the Gulf of Mexico, located about 210 miles southwest of Houston and 145 miles southeast from San Antonio. The elevation, in the county, ranges from sea level to about 180 feet above sea level. In the county, about 61 to 70 percent of the land is ideal farmland for many agricultural purposes.

=== Major highways ===
- I-37
- Future I-69E / US 77
- US 181 / SH 35
- SH 44
- SH 286
- SH 357
- SH 358
- SH 361
- Spur 3
- Spur 22
- Spur 407
- Spur 544

=== Adjacent counties ===
- San Patricio County (north)
- Kleberg County (south)
- Jim Wells County (west)
- Aransas County (northeast)

== Demographics ==
Historical population
Census	Pop.	Note	%±
1850	698		—
1860	2,906		316.3%
1870	3,975		36.8%
1880	7,673		93.0%
1890	8,093		5.5%
1900	10,439		29.0%
1910	21,955		110.3%
1920	22,807		3.9%
1930	51,779		127.0%
1940	92,661		79.0%
1950	165,471		78.6%
1960	221,573		33.9%
1970	237,544		7.2%
1980	268,215		12.9%
1990	291,145		8.5%
2000	313,645		7.7%
2010	340,223		8.5%
2020	353,178		3.8%
2025 (est.)	352,992	▼	−0.1%
U.S. Decennial Census; 1850–2010 2010 2020

=== Racial and ethnic composition ===
Nueces County, Texas – Racial and ethnic composition Note: the US Census treats Hispanic/Latino as an ethnic category. This table excludes Latinos from the racial categories and assigns them to a separate category. Hispanics/Latinos may be of any race.
Race / Ethnicity (NH = Non-Hispanic)	Pop 1980	Pop 1990	Pop 2000	Pop 2010	Pop 2020	% 1980	% 1990	% 2000	% 2010	% 2020
White alone (NH)	122,343	123,716	118,178	111,870	106,165	45.61%	42.49%	37.68%	32.88%	30.06%
Black or African American alone (NH)	12,031	11,946	12,718	12,178	12,651	4.49%	4.10%	4.05%	3.58%	3.58%
Native American or Alaska Native alone (NH)	734	806	933	882	907	0.27%	0.28%	0.30%	0.26%	0.26%
Asian alone (NH)	1,318	2,059	3,458	5,495	7,712	0.49%	0.71%	1.10%	1.62%	2.18%
Native Hawaiian or Pacific Islander alone (NH)	x	x	136	209	281	x	x	0.04%	0.06%	0.08%
Other race alone (NH)	542	567	308	399	1,264	0.20%	0.19%	0.10%	0.12%	0.36%
Mixed race or Multiracial (NH)	x	x	2,963	2,897	7,146	x	x	0.94%	0.85%	2.02%
Hispanic or Latino (any race)	131,247	152,051	174,951	206,293	217,052	48.93%	52.23%	55.78%	60.63%	61.46%
Total	268,215	291,145	313,645	340,223	353,178	100.00%	100.00%	100.00%	100.00%	100.00%

=== 2020 census ===
As of the 2020 census, the county had a population of 353,178, and the median age was 37.2 years. 23.5% of residents were under the age of 18 and 15.6% of residents were 65 years of age or older. For every 100 females there were 98.3 males, and for every 100 females age 18 and over there were 96.2 males age 18 and over.

The racial makeup of the county was 54.2% White, 4.1% Black or African American, 0.8% American Indian and Alaska Native, 2.3% Asian, 0.1% Native Hawaiian and Pacific Islander, 12.6% from some other race, and 25.9% from two or more races. Hispanic or Latino residents of any race comprised 61.5% of the population.

Around 93.7% of residents lived in urban areas, while 6.3% lived in rural areas.

There were 130,687 households in the county, of which 32.9% had children under the age of 18 living in them. Of all households, 43.3% were married-couple households, 20.9% were households with a male householder and no spouse or partner present, and 28.3% were households with a female householder and no spouse or partner present. About 26.1% of all households were made up of individuals and 9.8% had someone living alone who was 65 years of age or older.

There were 151,255 housing units, of which 13.6% were vacant. Among occupied housing units, 59.6% were owner-occupied and 40.4% were renter-occupied. The homeowner vacancy rate was 1.9% and the rental vacancy rate was 12.1%.

=== 2000 census ===
As of the 2000 census, 313,645 people, 110,365 households, and 79,683 families resided in the county. The population density was 375 people per square mile (145 people/km^{2}). The 123,041 housing units averaged 147 units per square mile (57/km^{2}). The racial makeup of the county was 72.03% White, 4.24% African American, 0.64% Native American, 1.16% Asian, 0.07% Pacific Islander, 18.74% from other races, and 3.13% from two or more races. About 55.78% of the population was Hispanic or Latino of any race.

Of the 110,365 households, 36.30% had children under the age of 18 living with them, 51.80% were married couples living together, 15.30% had a female householder with no husband present, and 27.80% were not families. About 22.60% of all households were made up of individuals, and 7.90% had someone living alone who was 65 years of age or older. The average household size was 2.79 and the average family size was 3.30.

In the county, the age distribution was 28.40% under the age of 18, 10.50% from 18 to 24, 28.90% from 25 to 44, 21.10% from 45 to 64, and 11.20% who were 65 years of age or older. The median age was 33 years. For every 100 females, there were 95.80 males. For every 100 females age 18 and over, there were 92.50 males. The largest perecentage of citizens is in the age group's 10–19, 20–29, and 30–39.

=== American Community Survey 2025 data ===
The United States Census Bureau estimated that in 2025, Nueces County’s population was 352.410. It was also estimated that the county's population was 29,30% Non-Hispanic White, 63,20% Hispanic or Latino, 3,60% Non-Hispanic Black, 2,10% Asian, 0,25% Native American, 0,05% Pacific Islander, and 1,50% Multiracial.

Total	Population	Percentage
Non-Hispanic White	103,256	29.30%
Hispanic or Latino	222,723	63.20%
Non-Hispanic Black	12,687	3.60%
Asian	7,401	2.10%
Native American	881	0.25%
Pacific Islander	176	0.05%
Non-Hispanic Multiracial	5,286	1.50%

== Communities ==
=== Cities (multiple counties) ===
- Aransas Pass (partly in San Patricio and Aransas Counties)
- Corpus Christi (county seat) (San Patricio and Aransas Counties)
- Ingleside (mostly in San Patricio County)
- Portland (mostly in San Patricio County)

In the 2000 U.S. census, a portion of San Patricio was indicated as being in Nueces County. As of the 1990 U.S. census, the 2010 U.S. census, and the 2020 U.S. census, that particular area is indicated as being in San Patricio County.

Port Aransas in 2005

=== Cities ===
- Agua Dulce
- Bishop
- Driscoll
- Petronila
- Port Aransas
- Robstown
- Corpus Christi

=== Census-designated places ===
- Banquete
- La Paloma-Lost Creek
- North San Pedro
- Rancho Banquete
- Sandy Hollow-Escondidas
- Spring Gardens
- Tierra Grande
- Tierra Verde

=== Unincorporated communities ===
- Chapman Ranch
- Rabb
- Violet

== Education ==
School districts:

- Agua Dulce Independent School District
- Aransas Pass Independent School District
- Banquete Independent School District
- Bishop Consolidated Independent School District
- Calallen Independent School District
- Corpus Christi Independent School District
- Driscoll Independent School District
- Flour Bluff Independent School District
- London Independent School District
- Port Aransas Independent School District
- Robstown Independent School District
- Tuloso-Midway Independent School District
- West Oso Independent School District

Del Mar College is the designated community college for all of Nueces County.

== Politics ==
Historically, Nueces County leaned Democratic in presidential elections, though in recent years has narrowly voted Republican. Dwight D. Eisenhower in 1956 became the first Republican candidate to carry the county. Prior to that year, the only times Nueces County did not vote for the national Democratic candidate was in its first presidential election in 1848 for Whig Zachary Taylor, and in 1860, supporting Southern Democratic John C. Breckinridge. Since Eisenhower's election, the only other Republicans to carry the county in the 20th century were Richard Nixon in 1972 and Ronald Reagan in 1984. So far, Bill Clinton remains the last Democratic candidate to win Nueces County, having done so in 1996.

Since 2000, Nueces County has voted for every Republican presidential candidate, with only George W. Bush in 2004 and Donald Trump in 2024 having carried it by a double digit margin, with Bush's 56.8% of the vote also the highest for any Republican in the county's history. In 2016, Trump defeated Hillary Clinton in the county with a plurality of 48.6% to 47.1%, or 1,568 votes, the closest race since 1956.

Democratic strength is concentrated within the inland portion of the county, with particular strengths in center portion of Corpus Christi whereas neighborhoods that are predominately Hispanic and the city of Robstown. Republicans performed well in areas particularly in the suburbs of the city, North Padre Island and Port Aransas.

United States presidential election results for Nueces County, Texas
Year	Republican		Democratic		Third party(ies)	
Year	No.	%	No.	%	No.	%
1912	85	6.50%	910	69.63%	312	23.87%
1916	404	16.85%	1,830	76.35%	163	6.80%
1920	383	21.55%	1,246	70.12%	148	8.33%
1928	2,481	45.36%	2,985	54.58%	3	0.05%
1932	967	12.62%	6,659	86.91%	36	0.47%
1936	1,234	15.54%	6,597	83.09%	109	1.37%
1940	3,065	23.87%	9,740	75.84%	37	0.29%
1944	3,819	24.21%	11,091	70.32%	863	5.47%
1948	5,577	25.60%	15,240	69.96%	966	4.43%
1952	19,124	48.59%	20,156	51.21%	79	0.20%
1956	19,985	49.89%	19,912	49.71%	162	0.40%
1960	18,907	39.09%	29,361	60.70%	100	0.21%
1964	14,048	25.75%	40,426	74.10%	84	0.15%
1968	21,307	31.57%	39,025	57.82%	7,159	10.61%
1972	41,682	55.39%	33,277	44.22%	291	0.39%
1976	32,797	37.99%	52,755	61.11%	773	0.90%
1980	40,586	46.84%	43,424	50.12%	2,634	3.04%
1984	54,333	53.68%	46,721	46.16%	159	0.16%
1988	46,337	48.30%	49,209	51.30%	386	0.40%
1992	36,781	36.49%	46,317	45.95%	17,693	17.55%
1996	37,470	40.22%	50,009	53.68%	5,689	6.11%
2000	49,906	51.28%	45,349	46.59%	2,071	2.13%
2004	59,359	56.77%	44,439	42.50%	762	0.73%
2008	52,391	51.75%	47,912	47.33%	927	0.92%
2012	48,966	50.95%	45,772	47.63%	1,366	1.42%
2016	50,766	48.62%	49,198	47.12%	4,441	4.25%
2020	64,617	50.75%	60,925	47.85%	1,780	1.40%
2024	67,201	55.23%	53,248	43.76%	1,229	1.01%

United States Senate election results for Nueces County, Texas1
Year	Republican		Democratic		Third party(ies)	
Year	No.	%	No.	%	No.	%
2024	62,062	51.52%	55,433	46.02%	2,964	2.46%

United States Senate election results for Nueces County, Texas2
Year	Republican		Democratic		Third party(ies)	
Year	No.	%	No.	%	No.	%
2020	64,558	51.52%	57,180	45.63%	3,576	2.85%
2026	42,868	43.16%	54,280	54.65%	2,171	2.19%

Texas Gubernatorial election results for Nueces County
Year	Republican		Democratic		Third party(ies)	
Year	No.	%	No.	%	No.	%
1994	31,116	44.52%	38,399	54.94%	376	0.54%
1998	38,165	60.80%	24,290	38.70%	316	0.50%
2002	33,152	48.20%	34,001	49.43%	1,627	2.37%
2006	25,066	37.07%	20,931	30.95%	21,624	31.98%
2010	32,593	52.69%	27,921	45.14%	1,341	2.17%
2014	30,854	54.13%	24,746	43.41%	1,403	2.46%
2018	52,918	56.33%	39,720	42.28%	1,312	1.40%
2022	47,567	53.27%	40,474	45.32%	1,260	1.41%
2026	45,887	45.85%	52,692	52.65%	1,503	1.50%

== See also ==
- National Register of Historic Places listings in Nueces County, Texas
- Recorded Texas Historic Landmarks in Nueces County
- List of museums in the Texas Gulf Coast
- Nueces County Keach Family Library
