= Aransas Pass, Texas =

City in Texas, US

- City
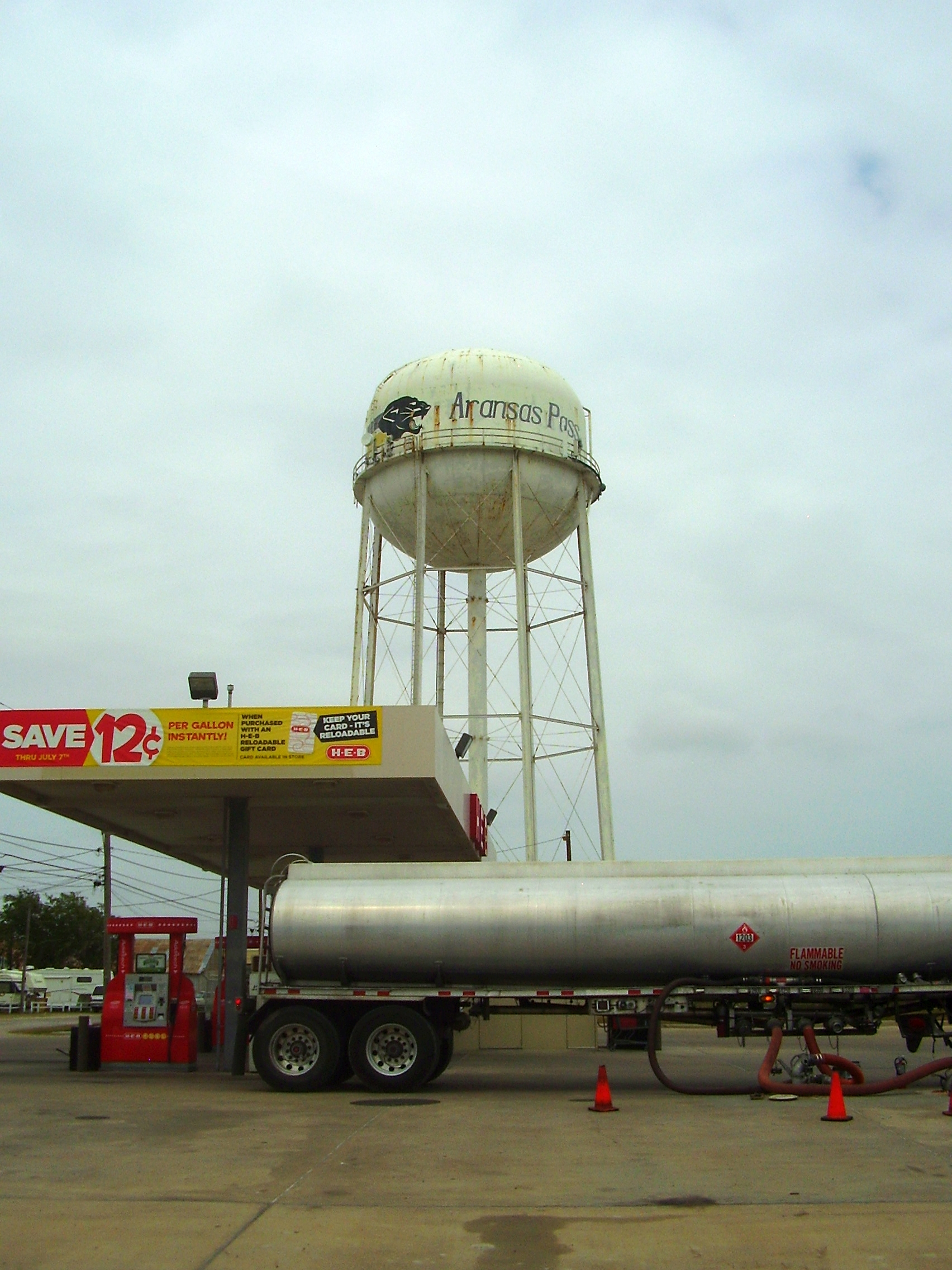
- Water tower
- Nicknames: Saltwater Heaven; The Harbor City
- Interactive map of Aransas Pass, Texas
- Coordinates: 27°54′N 97°8′W
- Country: United States
- State: Texas
- Counties: San Patricio, Aransas, Nueces

Government
  - Mayor: Jason Knight

Area
  - Total: 52.44 sq mi (135.83 km^{2})
  - Land: 12.57 sq mi (32.56 km^{2})
  - Water: 39.87 sq mi (103.27 km^{2})
- Elevation: 16 ft (5 m)

Population (2020)
  - Total: 7,941
  - Density: 667.3/sq mi (257.65/km^{2})
- Time zone: UTC-6 (Central (CST))
  - Summer (DST): UTC-5 (CDT)
- ZIP codes: 78335-78336
- Area code: 361
- FIPS code: 48-03600
- GNIS feature ID: 1329652
- Website: aptx.gov

Aransas Pass (/əˈrænzəs/ ə-RAN-zəs) is a city in Aransas, Nueces, and San Patricio counties in Texas, United States. The population was 7,941 at the 2020 census.

== Geography ==
Aransas Pass is located on the shore of Redfish Bay, a tidal water body between Corpus Christi Bay to the south and Aransas Bay to the north. The city is on the mainland of Texas and is connected to Mustang Island (which contains the city of Port Aransas) by a 6-mile (9.7 km)-long causeway, and a free ferry that carries vehicles to the island. By Texas State Highway 35 and U.S. Route 181, Aransas Pass is 20 mi (32 km) northeast of Corpus Christi.

According to the United States Census Bureau, the city of Aransas Pass has a total area of 135.6 km^{2} (52.4 sq mi), of which 32.6 km^{2} (12.6 sq mi) are land and 103.1 km^{2} (39.8 sq mi) (75.99%) are covered by water.

=== Climate ===
The climate in this area is characterized by hot, humid summers and generally mild to cool winters. According to the Köppen climate classification system, Aransas Pass has a humid subtropical climate, Cfa on climate maps.

Climate data for Aransas Pass
Month	Jan	Feb	Mar	Apr	May	Jun	Jul	Aug	Sep	Oct	Nov	Dec	Year
Mean daily maximum °F (°C)	64.9 (18.3)	67.6 (19.8)	72.6 (22.6)	78.3 (25.7)	83.7 (28.7)	88.5 (31.4)	89.7 (32.1)	91.0 (32.8)	88.6 (31.4)	82.9 (28.3)	74.1 (23.4)	67.3 (19.6)	79.1 (26.2)
Mean daily minimum °F (°C)	49.0 (9.4)	52.8 (11.6)	59.0 (15.0)	65.6 (18.7)	72.5 (22.5)	77.6 (25.3)	78.9 (26.1)	78.8 (26.0)	75.2 (24.0)	68.0 (20.0)	58.4 (14.7)	51.1 (10.6)	65.6 (18.7)
Average precipitation inches (mm)	2.22 (56)	1.76 (45)	2.55 (65)	1.90 (48)	3.95 (100)	3.52 (89)	2.66 (68)	2.47 (63)	5.92 (150)	3.73 (95)	2.80 (71)	1.74 (44)	35.22 (894)
Average precipitation days	6	5	4	4	4	4	3	5	8	5	4	6	58
Average relative humidity (%)	74	79	80	78	80	77	77	74	74	72	74	77	76
Average dew point °F (°C)	49.6 (9.8)	53.1 (11.7)	58.4 (14.7)	63.6 (17.6)	70.4 (21.3)	74.6 (23.7)	75.6 (24.2)	75.2 (24.0)	72.6 (22.6)	66.3 (19.1)	58.4 (14.7)	51.9 (11.1)	64.1 (17.9)
Mean monthly sunshine hours	173.6	183.6	229.4	249	310	324	347.2	322.4	261	229.4	168	148.8	2,946.4
Mean daily sunshine hours	5.6	6.5	7.4	8.3	10	10.8	11.2	10.4	8.7	7.4	5.6	4.8	8.1
Mean daily daylight hours	10.6	11.2	12	12.9	13.5	13.9	13.7	13.1	12.3	11.5	10.8	10.4	12.2
Source 1: PRISM Climate group(1991-2020)
Source 2: Weatherbase (precipitation days), Weather Atlas(humidity-sun-daylight)

== Demographics ==
Historical population
Census	Pop.	Note	%±
1910	1,197		—
1920	1,569		31.1%
1930	2,482		58.2%
1940	4,095		65.0%
1950	5,396		31.8%
1960	6,956		28.9%
1970	5,813		−16.4%
1980	7,173		23.4%
1990	7,180		0.1%
2000	8,138		13.3%
2010	8,204		0.8%
2020	7,941		−3.2%
U.S. Decennial Census 2020

=== Racial and ethnic composition ===
Aransas Pass city, Texas – Racial and ethnic composition Note: the US Census treats Hispanic/Latino as an ethnic category. This table excludes Latinos from the racial categories and assigns them to a separate category. Hispanics/Latinos may be of any race.
Race / Ethnicity (NH = Non-Hispanic)	Pop 2000	Pop 2010	Pop 2020	% 2000	% 2010	% 2020
White alone (NH)	4,590	4,472	4,149	56.40%	54.51%	52.25%
Black or African American alone (NH)	270	228	212	3.32%	2.78%	2.67%
Native American or Alaska Native alone (NH)	36	34	32	0.44%	0.41%	0.40%
Asian alone (NH)	37	78	72	0.45%	0.95%	0.91%
Native Hawaiian or Pacific Islander alone (NH)	1	9	3	0.01%	0.11%	0.04%
Other race alone (NH)	9	11	19	0.11%	0.13%	0.24%
Mixed race or Multiracial (NH)	127	94	229	1.56%	1.15%	2.88%
Hispanic or Latino (any race)	3,068	3,278	3,225	37.70%	39.96%	40.61%
Total	8,138	8,204	7,941	100.00%	100.00%	100.00%

=== 2020 census ===
As of the 2020 census, Aransas Pass had a population of 7,941 and 2,219 families residing in the city. The median age was 45.8 years. 20.9% of residents were under the age of 18 and 22.8% of residents were 65 years of age or older. For every 100 females there were 99.0 males, and for every 100 females age 18 and over there were 98.4 males age 18 and over.

98.0% of residents lived in urban areas, while 2.0% lived in rural areas.

There were 3,195 households in Aransas Pass, of which 26.9% had children under the age of 18 living in them. Of all households, 46.8% were married-couple households, 21.4% were households with a male householder and no spouse or partner present, and 25.6% were households with a female householder and no spouse or partner present. About 27.8% of all households were made up of individuals and 13.6% had someone living alone who was 65 years of age or older.

There were 4,199 housing units, of which 23.9% were vacant. Among occupied housing units, 66.6% were owner-occupied and 33.4% were renter-occupied. The homeowner vacancy rate was 3.2% and the rental vacancy rate was 16.6%.

Racial composition as of the 2020 census
Race	Percent
White	68.4%
Black or African American	2.9%
American Indian and Alaska Native	0.9%
Asian	0.9%
Native Hawaiian and Other Pacific Islander	0.1%
Some other race	10.8%
Two or more races	15.9%

=== 2000 census ===
As of the census of 2000, 8,138 people, 3,075 households, and 3,012 families resided in the city. The population density was 758.1 inhabitants per square mile (292.7/km^{2}). The 3,493 housing units averaged 325.4 per mi^{2} (125.6/km^{2}). The racial makeup of the city was 80.58% White, 3.44% African American, 0.76% Native American, 0.45% Asian, 0.01% Pacific Islander, 11.28% from other races, and 3.47% from two or more races. Hispanics of any race were 37.70% of the population.

Of the 2,961 households, 34.4% had children under the age of 18 living with them, 54.1% were married couples living together, 13.4% had a female householder with no husband present, and 27.7% were not families. About 23.1% of all households were made up of individuals, and 10.0% had someone living alone who was 65 years of age or older. The average household size was 2.70 and the average family size was 3.17.

In the city, the population was distributed as 28.4% under the age of 18, 9.4% from 18 to 24, 25.4% from 25 to 44, 22.3% from 45 to 64, and 14.5% who were 65 years of age or older. The median age was 36 years. For every 100 females, there were 97.5 males. For every 100 females age 18 and over, there were 95.0 males.

The median income for a household in the city was $27,376, and for a family was $33,227. Males had a median income of $29,383 versus $17,969 for females. The per capita income for the city was $12,964. About 18.3% of families and 19.6% of the population were below the poverty line, including 23.5% of those under age 18 and 10.9% of those age 65 or over.

The primary industries are shrimping and tourism, along with farming and oil and gas interests. The shrimp boat fleet sails from Conn Brown Harbor, a large, protected harbor chiefly dedicated to the shrimping industry. The area is popular for saltwater sports fishing and beach-going.

== Education ==
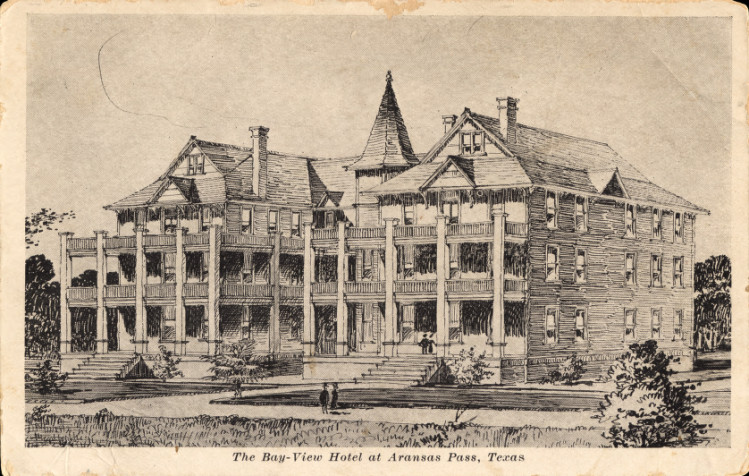
Bay-View Hotel in Aransas Pass (postcard, c. 1893–1924)

Most of Aransas Pass is within the Aransas Pass Independent School District. Schools of that district include H. T. Faulk Early Childhood School (Pre-K–1), Kieberger Elementary School (2–3), Charlie Marshall Elementary School (4–5), A. C. Blunt Middle School (6–8), and Aransas Pass High School (9–12).

Some portions of Aransas Pass are in the Port Aransas Independent School District.

Del Mar College is the designated community college for all of Aransas, Nueces, and San Patricio counties.

== Notable people ==
- Emory Bellard, former University of Texas offensive coordinator and head coach at Texas A&M, inventor of the Wishbone formation
- Tommy Blake, former star defensive end at Texas Christian University
- Mickey Sullivan, former Baylor baseball coach

== See also ==
- List of municipalities in Texas
