= Rusty Russell (American football coach) =

American football player and coach (1895–1983)

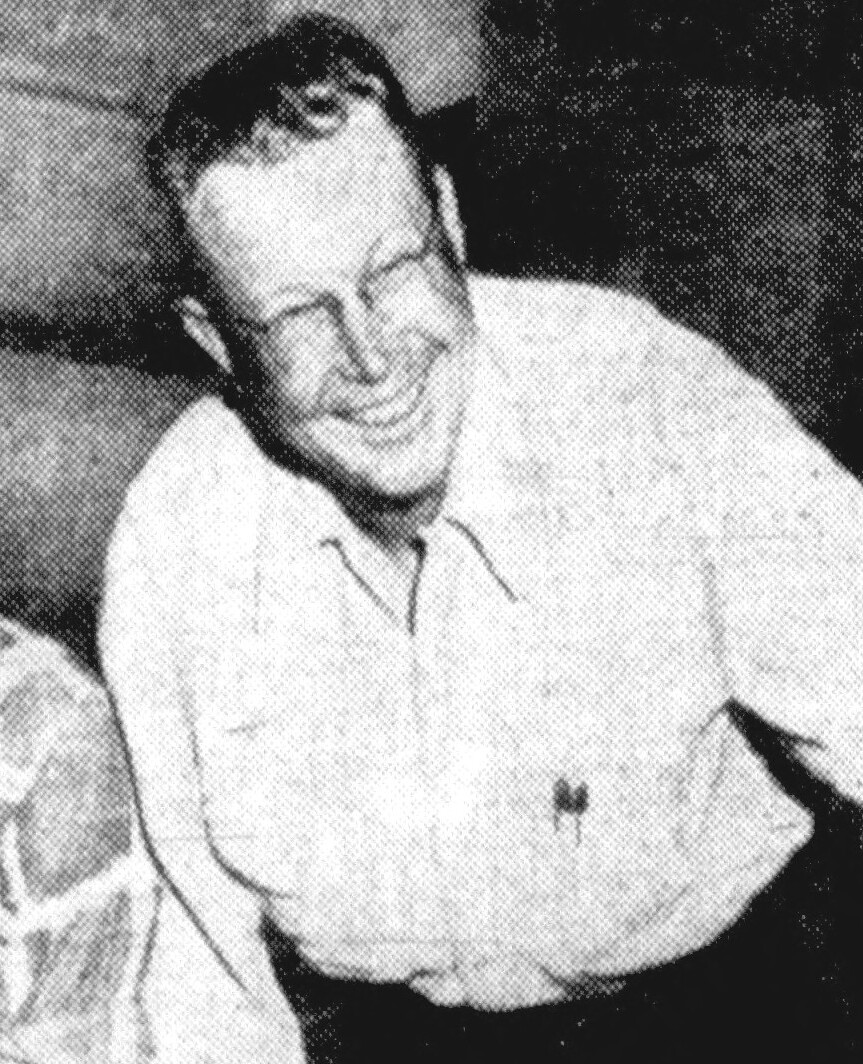
- Russell, circa 1950

Biographical details
- Born: December 4, 1895; Fredonia, Texas, U.S.
- Died: December 21, 1983 (aged 88); Plano, Texas, U.S.

Playing career
- 1919–1921: Howard Payne
- Position: End

Coaching career (HC unless noted)
- 1922: Granger HS (TX)
- 1923–1924: Temple HS (TX) (assistant)
- 1925–1928: Temple HS (TX)
- 1929–1942: Masonic Home (TX)
- 1942–1944: Highland Park HS (TX)
- 1945–1949: SMU (backfield)
- 1950–1952: SMU
- 1953: Schreiner
- 1954–1960: Victoria
- 1962–1963: Howard Payne

Head coaching record
- Overall: 17–30–3 (college); 45–30–3 (junior college); 181–40–14 (high school)

Accomplishments and honors

Championships
- 1 Longhorn (1956)

Awards
- All-TIAA (1921); Champion Spark Plug NCAA Sportsman of the Year (1950); Texas Coaches Hall of Honor (1961); Texas Sports Hall of Fame (1971); Howard Payne University Hall of Fame (1989); Texas High School Sports Hall of Fame (1990)

Harvey Nual "Rusty" Russell (December 4, 1895 – December 21, 1983) was an American football coach at the high school, junior college, and college level in the state of Texas. He served as the head football coach at Southern Methodist University (SMU) from 1950 to 1952 and Howard Payne University from 1962 to 1963, compiling career college football coaching record of 17–30–3. Russell was also head football coach at an orphanage in Fort Worth, Texas, the Masonic Home and School, from 1929 to 1941. He co-authored the American Football Coaches Association (AFCA) Code of Ethics in 1952 along with fellow coaches William D. Murray, Lloyd Jordan, and Bud Wilkinson. He is known for developing the spread offense.

== Playing career ==
Russell attended Howard Payne University in Brownwood, Texas, where he was a three-sport letterman, in track, basketball, and football, and was captain of both the basketball and football teams. In football, he was named all-Texas Intercollegiate Athletic Association (TIAA) at End.

== Coaching career ==
Russell started his coaching career at the high school level. In 1922 he was the head coach at Granger High School for one year (7-3 record). In 1923 he became the assistant head coach at Temple High School, then head coach in 1925 and 1926, where he took them to the state semifinals in 1926 (1925–26; 20–3 record).

In 1929 he was hired to start a football program at Fort Worth Masonic Home, where he remained until 1942. While he was there, the team had an overall record of 127–30–12 (81% win percentage). The Masonic Home was an orphanage with a total high school enrollment of about 160 boys and girls. They eventually played in the top class at the time, the "A" leagues in Texas, with schools who had thousands of students. In his 16 years at Masonic Home, he went to the State playoffs 10 times. Building a football program from scratch, Russell guided the Masonic Home's 'Mighty Mites' to a tie versus Corsicana High School in the 1932 state championship game. Russell's 1941 team was undefeated but he withdrew from the playoffs following his first postseason win after finding he had an ineligible player who was a year older than the family had listed.

In 1942, Russell was hired to coach at Highland Park High School in Dallas. During his first year at Highland Park, Russell remained a coach at Masonic Home, which was 35 miles away. He arranged to coach at the two schools on alternate days and had the games arranged on Fridays and Saturdays so they would not conflict. Masonic Home was a coin toss away from playing Highland Park in the 1942 playoffs. Russell remained at Highland Park until 1944; he had an overall record there of 27–4. He guided a squad that featured Bobby Layne and Doak Walker to an appearance in the 1944 state championship game.

In 1944, he was hired as backfield coach at Southern Methodist University. He lured away Doak Walker from the University of Texas to enroll at SMU instead. As head assistant coach and responsible for the offense, Russell enjoyed a 32 win 16 loss and 5 tie record, where the Mustangs were nationally ranked, won two Southwest Conference championships, and made two Cotton Bowl appearances in 1947 and 1948. Following Matty Bell's resignation on January 22, 1950, Russell was immediately named his successor. After a good start with a 6–4 season in 1950 where SMU was rated #1 in the nation midway through the season, Russell was increasingly under fire after two losing seasons in 1951 and 1952. He eventually resigned on February 2, 1953. Russell then coached one year at Schreiner College, 1953 (5–3–1). He then went on to Victoria College as head coach and athletic director from 1954 through the 1960 seasons, where his record was (40–27–2). He then retired from coaching.

In 1962, he came out of retirement to be the head coach at his alma mater, Howard Payne University. He again retired after two losing seasons. His record as a high school head coach over 23 seasons, was 181 wins, 40 losses, and 14 ties (82% win %), His overall record as a head coach in 23 years as high school and 13 years as college head coach is 250-100-21 (71% win percentage). He was an assistant coach for 5 years in College at SMU and 2 years in high school at Temple, Texas, for a total career of 42 years. He held a master's degree in education and was a teacher and principal many of his high school coaching years. Russell coached a number of All-Americans while at SMU, among them Doak Walker, Dick McKissack, Kyle Rote, Dick Hightower, and Val Joe Walker. Doak Walker also asked Russell to make his introduction as he received the 1948 Heisman Trophy award. In addition, Walker won the Maxwell Award in 1947. Russell also had two All-Americans at Victoria (Charlie Burk and Floyd Dellinger). Russell coached a number of NFL players, among them: Kyle Rote, Doak Walker, Bobby Layne, Tex Coulter, Hardy Brown, Herschel Forester, Bill Forester, Paul Page, Raymond Berry, Fred Benners, Pat Knight, Ed Bernet and Forrest Gregg.

Using a complex passing attack, unheard of at the time, Russell is considered one of the forerunners of the spread offense.

== Honors ==
Russell was inducted to the Texas High School Football Hall of Fame in 1990. He is member of the Sports Hall of Fame at Howard Payne University, the Texas High School Coaches Hall of Honor, and the Texas Sports Hall of Fame. He won NCAA National Coach of the week when at SMU, once in 1950 and again in 1951 for his respective wins over Ohio State and Notre Dame. Russell was also a charter member of the National Football Hall of Fame Association.

== Death ==
Russell died in a hospital in Plano, Texas on December 21, 1983, at the age of 88.

== In popular culture ==
The story of the Mighty Mites and their rise from a team of rag-tag orphans to a Texas football powerhouse was the subject of the 2008 book Twelve Mighty Orphans: The Inspiring True Story of the Mighty Mites Who Ruled Texas Football by sportswriter Jim Dent. Dent refers to Russell in the book as "the father of the spread offense". The book was adapted as the 2021 film 12 Mighty Orphans, in which Russell was portrayed by Luke Wilson.

== Head coaching record ==
=== College ===
Year	Team	Overall	Conference	Standing
SMU Mustangs (Southwest Conference) (1950–1952)
1950	SMU	6–4	2–4	T–5th
1951	SMU	3–6–1	1–4–1	7th
1952	SMU	4–5–1	3–2–1	3rd
SMU:		13–15–2	6–10–2	
Howard Payne Yellow Jackets (Lone Star Conference) (1962–1963)
1962	Howard Payne	1–8–1	0–6–1	8th
1963	Howard Payne	3–7	1–6	
Howard Payne:		4–15–1	2–12–1	
Total:		17–30–3		

=== Junior college ===
Year	Team	Overall	Conference	Standing	Bowl/playoffs
Schreiner Mountaineers (Pioneer Conference) (1953)
1953	Schreiner	5–3–1	1–2–1	T–3rd	
Schreiner:		5–3–1	1–2–1		
Victoria Pirates (Longhorn Conference) (1954–1957)
1954	Victoria	6–4	1–3	T–4th	
1955	Victoria	6–4	0–4	5th	
1956	Victoria	7–3	3–1	T–1st	
1957	Victoria	4–4–1	1–2	T–3rd	
Victoria Pirates (Pioneer Conference) (1958–1960)
1958	Victoria	4–6	2–4	T–4th	
1959	Victoria	8–2	4–1	2nd	
1960	Victoria	5–4–1	0–3–1	5th	
Victoria:		40–27–2	11–18–1		
Total:		45–30–3			
National championship Conference title Conference division title or championship game berth
