= South Texas Conference =

Junior college athletic conference in Texas

The South Texas Conference, also called the South Texas Junior College Conference, was a junior college athletic conference with member schools located in Texas that operated from 1947 to 1955. It was formed on February 26, 1947, at the Hotel Alice, in Alice, Texas. The conference had seven charter members: Brownsville Junior College—now known as Texas Southmost College, Corpus Christi Junior College—now known as Del Mar College, Edinburg Junior College—now known as the University of Texas–Pan American, Laredo Junior College—now known as Laredo College, Texas Lutheran College—now known as Texas Lutheran University, Victoria Junior College—now known as Victoria College, and Wharton Junior College—now known as Wharton County Junior College. The South Texas Conference dissolved in 1954. The three remaining members—Del Mar, Victoria, and Wharton—joined the newly formed Longhorn Conference.

== Yearly football standings ==
1951 South Texas Conference football standings
| | Conf. | | | | | Overall |
| Team | W | | L | | T | W | | L | | T |
|---|---|---|---|---|---|---|---|---|---|---|
| Del Mar $ | 2 | – | 0 | – | 0 | 9 | – | 1 | – | 0 |
| Wharton | 1 | – | 1 | – | 0 | 6 | – | 3 | – | 1 |
| Victoria | 0 | – | 2 | – | 0 | 2 | – | 7 | – | 0 |
$ – Conference champion

1953 South Texas Conference football standings
| | Conf. | | | | | Overall |
| Team | W | | L | | T | W | | L | | T |
|---|---|---|---|---|---|---|---|---|---|---|
| Wharton $ | 2 | – | 0 | – | 0 | 7 | – | 4 | – | 0 |
| Del Mar | 1 | – | 1 | – | 0 | 7 | – | 3 | – | 0 |
| Victoria | 0 | – | 2 | – | 0 | 0 | – | 9 | – | 0 |
$ – Conference champion
