= Chena Gilstrap =

American football coach (1914–2002)

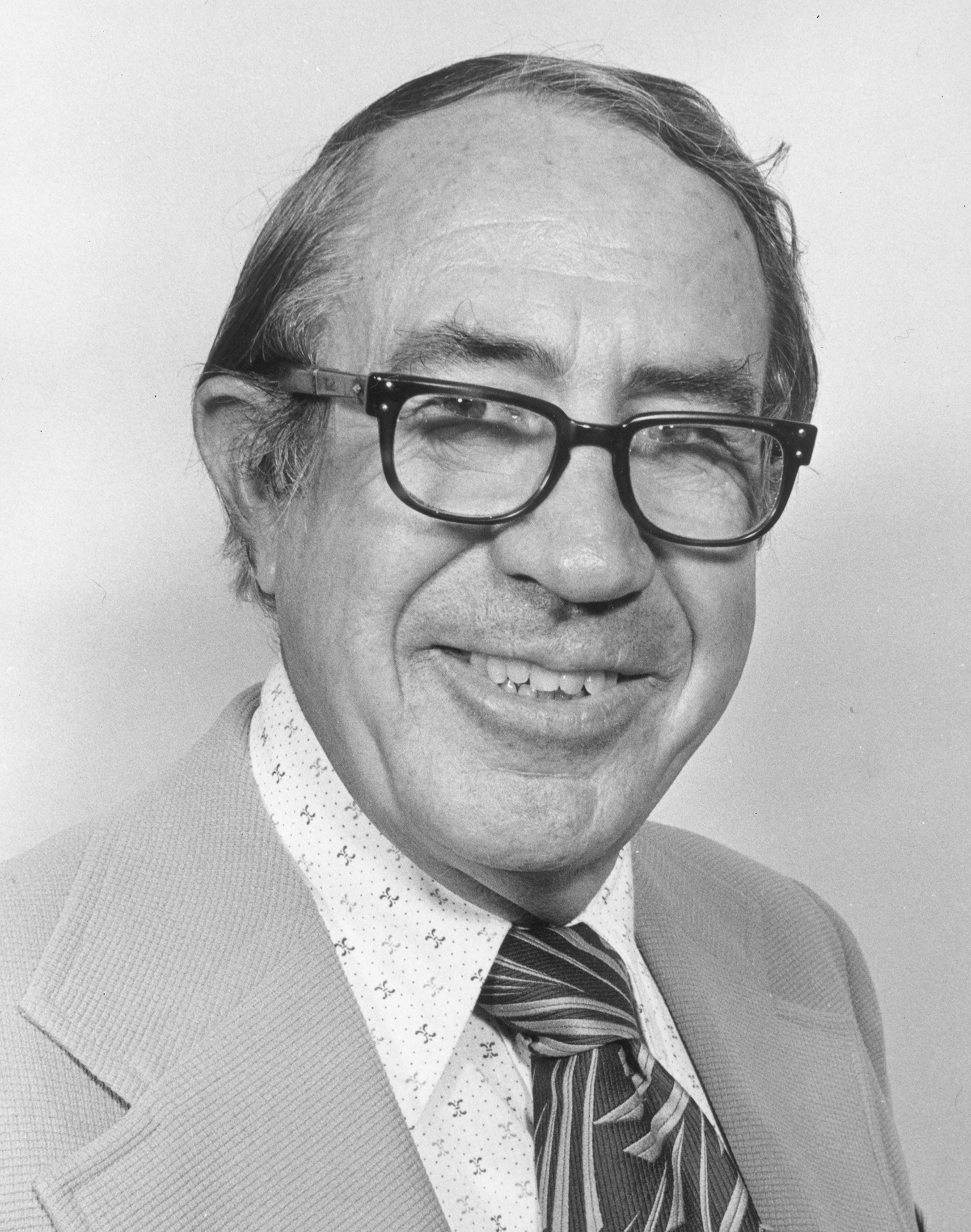

Biographical details
- Born: July 31, 1914; Granger, Texas, U.S.
- Died: August 9, 2002 (aged 88); Palo Alto, California, U.S.
- Education: Schreiner Institute

Coaching career (HC unless noted)
- 1948–1949: Paris
- 1950–1952: Schreiner
- 1953–1965: Arlington State

Administrative career (AD unless noted)
- 1952–1975: Arlington State / Texas–Arlington

Head coaching record
- Overall: 34–31 (college); 80–30–3 (junior college)
- Bowls: 2–1 (junior college)

Accomplishments and honors

Championships
- 3 Pioneer Conference (1953, 1956–1957)

Awards
- Southland Conference Coach of the Year - 1963; Texas Junior College Coach of the Year - 1948, 1954, 1956, 1957; NCAA District 7 Small College Coach of the Year- 1961

Claude Robbins "Chena" Gilstrap (July 31, 1914 – August 9, 2002) was an American football coach who coached at Arlington State College—now known as the University of Texas at Arlington for 13 years. He was the ninth head football coach, serving from 1953 to 1965 and compiling a record of 85–40–3. Gilstrap is the only former UTA coach or player inducted into the Texas Sports Hall of Fame.

Gilstrap was born on a farm near Granger, on July 31, 1914. He played football for the Granger High School regional championship football team and then followed his older brother, Bully Gilstrap to the University of Texas and played football under Coach Jack Chevigny, but transferred to Shreiner Institute, where his brother was the head football coach, in 1933 before he could letter. He had planned to go to medical school, earning a degree in biology in 1935, but had to change his plans due to the untimely death of his father.

Gilstrap followed his brother into coaching. He was head football coach at Leveretts Chapel High School, Crocket High School, Wharton High School, Cleburne High School, Paris Junior College, Schreiner Institute, and Arlington State College.

In 1950, at Schreiner, he led the team to its most successful season in a decade.

At Arlington State, he was athletic director and head football coach from 1952 to 1965. His teams won consecutive Junior Rose Bowl games in Pasadena in 1956 and 1957. The 1957 Arlington State Rebels football team was undefeated and ranked No. 1 nationally among junior colleges. Gilstrap guided UTA from junior college status to a four-year program in 1959.

Once UTA became a four-year institution, Gilstrap was instrumental in forming the Southland Conference (SLC), of which Arington State was a charter member. In 1965, he led the Rebels, as they were known then, to a 6–3 record, was named SLC Coach of the Year and retired from the sidelines with an 85-40-3 record in 13 seasons at Arlington State. He remained at Arlington State as Director of Athletics until 1975, and chairman of the Department of Physical Education until 1978.

He was named as Junior College Coach of the Year by the Texas Sportswriters Association in 1948, 1954, 1956 and 1957 and NCAA small College Coach of the Year in 1961 for District 7. He received the Distinguished Service Award from the Texas High School Coaching Association in 1966, and the Distinguished American Award from the National Football Foundation and Hall of Fame in 1969. He was named to the UTA Hall of Honor for UTA Athletics in 1984, the Hall of Fame for the National Association of Collegiate Athletic Directors in 1987, to the Texas Sports Hall of Fame in 1994, the NJCAA football coaches association Hall of Fame in 1995 and to the Shreiner University Athletic Hall of Honor in 2005. He was also named Arlington Citizen of the Year in 1957 and later served on the United States Olympic Committee.

He died in 2002 from Alzheimer's and Parkinson's disease.

== Head coaching record ==
=== College ===
| Year | Team | Overall | Conference | Standing | Bowl/playoffs |
|---|---|---|---|---|---|
Arlington State Rebels (NCAA College Division independent) (1959–1965)
| 1959 | Arlington State | 4–3 | | | |
| 1960 | Arlington State | 9–2 | | | |
| 1961 | Arlington State | 7–3 | | | |
| 1962 | Arlington State | 4–6 | | | |
| 1963 | Arlington State | 1–8 | | | |
Arlington State Rebels (Southland Conference) (1964–1965)
| 1964 | Arlington State | 3–6–1 | 0–3–1 | 5th | |
| 1965 | Arlington State | 6–3 | 2–2 | T–2nd | |
| Arlington State: | | 34–31-1 | 2–5–1 | | |
| Total: | | 34–31-1 | | | |

=== Junior college ===
| Year | Team | Overall | Conference | Standing | Bowl/playoffs |
|---|---|---|---|---|---|
Paris Dragons (Southwestern Junior College Conference) (1948–1949)
| 1948 | Paris | 8–3 | 5–2 | T–2nd | L Oleander Bowl |
| 1949 | Paris | 3–7 | 2–5 | 6th | |
| Paris: | | 11–10 | 7–7 | | |
Schreiner Mountaineers (Pioneer Conference) (1950–1952)
| 1950 | Schreiner | 7–3 | 1–2 | 3rd | |
| 1951 | Schreiner | 6–4 | 2–2 | 2nd | |
| 1952 | Schreiner | 5–4–1 | 2–2 | T–2nd | |
| Schreiner: | | 18–11–1 | 5–6 | | |
Arlington State Rebels (Pioneer Conference) (1953–1958)
| 1953 | Arlington State | 8–1 | 4–0 | 1st | |
| 1954 | Arlington State | 8–2 | 2–2 | T–3rd | |
| 1955 | Arlington State | 7–3 | 3–1 | 2nd | |
| 1956 | Arlington State | 9–1–1 | 3–1 | T–1st | W Junior Rose Bowl |
| 1957 | Arlington State | 12–0 | 4–0 | 1st | W Junior Rose Bowl |
| 1958 | Arlington State | 7–2–1 | 4–1–1 | T–2nd | |
| Arlington State: | | 51–9–2 | 20–5–1 | | |
| Total: | | 80–30–3 | | | |
National championship Conference title Conference division title or championship game berth
