= 1957 Arlington State Rebels football team =

American college football season

1957 Arlington State Rebels football

PC champion Junior Rose Bowl champion

Junior Rose Bowl, W 21–12 vs. Cerritos
- Conference: Pioneer Conference
- Record: 12–0 (4–0 PC)
- Head coach: Chena Gilstrap (5th season)
- Home stadium: Memorial Stadium

1957 Pioneer Conference (junior college) football standings
	Conf.					Overall
Team	W		L		T	W		L		T
Arlington State $	4	–	0	–	0	12	–	0	–	0
Cameron	3	–	1	–	0	8	–	3	–	0
San Angelo	2	–	2	–	0	4	–	5	–	1
Tarleton State	1	–	3	–	0	2	–	7	–	0
Ranger	0	–	4	–	0	0	–	8	–	0
$ – Conference champion

The 1957 Arlington State Rebels football team was an American football team that represented Arlington State College (now known as the University of Texas at Arlington) as a member of the Pioneer Conference (PC) during the 1957 junior college football season. In their fifth year under head coach Chena Gilstrap, the team compiled a perfect 12–0 record, won the PC championship, held 10 opponents to seven points or less, and outscored all opponents by a total of 425 to 62. They also played in the Junior Rose Bowl for the second consecutive year, defeating Cerritos College, 21–12, to claim the junior college national championship.

Arlington led the PC in both total offense (349 yards per game) and total defense (159 yards per game). Arlington's Justin Rowland was the leading pass receiver in the conference, and halfback Kenny Williams was the leading scorer.

The Rebels played their home games at Memorial Stadium in Arlington, Texas.

== Schedule ==
Date	Time	Opponent	Site	Result	Attendance	Source
September 12		at Kilgore*	Kilgore, TX	W 32–0		
September 21	8:00 p.m.	at Del Mar*	Buccaneer Stadium; Corpus Christi, TX	W 39–7	3,000	
September 28		Wharton*	Memorial Stadium; Arlington, TX	W 41–7	5,873	
October 5		at Navarro*	Corsicana, TX	W 33–7		
October 17		at Paris*	Noyes Stadium; Paris, TX	W 27–7	1,000	
October 25		North Texas State freshman*	Memorial Stadium; Arlington, TX	W 41–0	1,500	
November 2		Victoria*	Memorial Stadium; Arlington, TX	W 47–13	4,500	
November 9		Cameron State	Memorial Stadium; Arlington, TX	W 34–7		
November 16		at Ranger	Ranger, TX	W 40–0		
November 22		Tarleton State^{†}	Memorial Stadium; Arlington, TX (Silver Bugle)	W 32–0	2,500	
November 28		at San Angelo	Bobcat Stadium; San Angelo, TX	W 38–2	5,000	
December 14		vs. Cerritos*	Rose Bowl; Pasadena, CA (Junior Rose Bowl)	W 21–12	36,008	
*Non-conference game; ^{†}Homecoming; All times are in Central time
