= 1951 Del Mar Vikings football team =

American college football season

1951 Del Mar Vikings football

STC champion Memorial Bowl champion

Memorial Bowl, W 33–6 vs. Pearl River
- Conference: South Texas Conference
- Record: 9–1 (2–0 STC)
- Head coach: Ed Kelley
- Home stadium: Buccaneer Stadium

1951 South Texas Conference football standings
	Conf.					Overall
Team	W		L		T	W		L		T
Del Mar $	2	–	0	–	0	9	–	1	–	0
Wharton	1	–	1	–	0	6	–	3	–	1
Victoria	0	–	2	–	0	2	–	7	–	0
$ – Conference champion

The 1951 Del Mar Vikings football team represented Del Mar College of Corpus Christi, Texas, as a member of the South Texas Conference (STC) during the 1951 junior college football season. Led by head coach Ed Kelley, the Vikings compiled a 9–1 record (2–0 against conference opponents), won the STC championship, and defeated Pearl River in the 1951 Memorial Bowl. Del Mar was ranked at No. 88 in the 1951 Litkenhous Ratings. It was the highest ranked junior college team.

== Schedule ==
Date	Opponent	Site	Result	Attendance	Source
September 20	at Kilgore*	Kilgore, TX	L 7–14		
September 29	Texas Lutheran*	Buccaneer Stadium; Corpus Christi, TX	W 58–6	1,500	
October 5	at Schreiner*	Kerrville, TX	W 41–13		
October 12	Rice Owlets*	Houston, TX	W 46–13		
October 20	Ranger*	Corpus Christi, TX	W 40–14		
November 3	Wharton^{†}	Buccaneer Stadium; Corpus Christi, TX	W 33–7	5,000	
November 10	Cisco*	Buccaneer Stadium; Corpus Christi, TX	W 72–13	500	
November 17	Houston "B" team*	Buccaneer Stadium; Corpus Christi, TX	W 52–15	500	
November 22	at Victoria	Patti Welder Stadium; Victoria, TX	W 24–0		
December 8	at Pearl River*	Jackson, MS (Memorial Bowl)	W 33–6	12,000	
*Non-conference game; ^{†}Homecoming
