= Longhorn Conference =

Junior college athletic conference in Texas

The Longhorn Conference was a junior college athletic conference with member schools located in Texas that operated from 1954 to 1957. The conference was formed on November 23, 1953, at the Rice Hotel in Houston, and eliminated the Big Six Junior College Conference and the South Texas Conference. The conference initially had five members Del Mar College, Kilgore College, Tyler Junior College, Victoria College, and Wharton County Junior College. Del Mar, Victoria, and Wharton had been members of the South Texas Conference while Kilgore and Tyler were members of the Big Six. Tyler left the conference abruptly in September 1957. The Longhorn Conference disbanded in 1958. Del Mar, Victoria, and Wharton joined the Pioneer Conference. Kilgore initially joined the Pioneer Conference as well, but then moved to newly-formed Texas Eastern Conference, along with Paris Junior College, Texarkana College, and Tyler.

== Yearly football standings ==
1954 Longhorn Conference football standings
	Conf.					Overall
Team	W		L		T	W		L		T
Kilgore $	4	–	0	–	0	9	–	1	–	0
Del Mar	2	–	1	–	1	5	–	3	–	1
Tyler	1	–	2	–	1	6	–	3	–	2
Victoria	1	–	3	–	0	6	–	4	–	0
Wharton	1	–	3	–	0	4	–	6	–	0
$ – Conference champion

1955 Longhorn Conference football standings
	Conf.					Overall
Team	W		L		T	W		L		T
Del Mar $	4	–	0	–	0	8	–	1	–	0
Wharton	3	–	1	–	0	7	–	3	–	0
Kilgore	2	–	2	–	0	8	–	2	–	0
Tyler	1	–	3	–	0	5	–	4	–	1
Victoria	0	–	4	–	0	6	–	4	–	0
$ – Conference champion

1956 Longhorn Conference football standings
	Conf.					Overall
Team	W		L		T	W		L		T
Kilgore +	3	–	1	–	0	8	–	3	–	0
Victoria +	3	–	1	–	0	7	–	3	–	0
Del Mar	2	–	1	–	1	?	–	?	–	?
Wharton	1	–	3	–	0	?	–	?	–	?
Tyler	0	–	3	–	1	?	–	?	–	?
+ – Conference co-champions

1957 Longhorn Conference football standings
	Conf.					Overall
Team	W		L		T	W		L		T
Kilgore +	2	–	1	–	0	7	–	2	–	0
Del Mar +	2	–	1	–	0	4	–	4	–	0
Wharton	1	–	2	–	0	4	–	5	–	0
Victoria	1	–	2	–	0	4	–	4	–	1
+ – Conference co-champions
