= Granger Independent School District =

School district in Texas, United States

Address
- 300 North Colorado Street Granger, Texas; United States

District information
- Grades: PK–12
- Schools: 1
- NCES District ID: 4821590

Students and staff
- Students: 561 (2023–2024)
- Teachers: 48.75 (on an FTE basis)
- Student–teacher ratio: 11.51:1

Other information
- Website: www.grangerisd.net

The Granger Independent School District is a public school district based in Granger, Texas, United States. The district has a combined High School and Elementary School serving students in grades pre-kindergarten through twelve that come from north central Williamson County.

== TEA Ratings ==
In 2009, the school district was rated "academically acceptable" by the Texas Education Agency.

In 2022, the school district's Report Card was rated an overall "B", Student Achievement was rated a "B", School Progress was rated a "B", and Closing In The Gaps was rated a "C" by the Texas Education Agency.
