= Pioneer Conference (junior college) =

Junior college athletic conference in Oklahoma and Texas

The Pioneer Conference, also called the Pioneer Athletic Conference and the Pioneer Junior College Conference, was a junior college athletic conference with member schools located in Texas and Oklahoma that operated from 1950 to 1961. The conference was formed on December 20, 1949, at a meeting in Brownwood, Texas, by representatives of its four charter members: Arlington State College—now known as the University of Texas at Arlington, San Angelo College—now known as Angelo State University, Schreiner Institute—now known as Schreiner University, and Tarleton State College—now known as Tarleton State University. W. C. "Heinie" Weir, the dean of men at Schreiner, was elected the conference's first president. Ranger Junior College—now known as Ranger College—joined the Pioneer Conference in 1951. The conference expanded to six members in 1957 with addition of Cameron State Agricultural College—now known as Cameron University.

In 1958, the Pioneer Conference absorbed four schools from the disbanded Longhorn Conference: Del Mar College, Kilgore College, Victoria College, and Wharton County Junior College. Soon after joining the conference, Kilgore dropped out and moved to newly-formed Texas Eastern Conference. The same year, Ranger left the conference for the incipient Texas Junior College Conference. Arlington State left the Pioneer Conference in 1959 when the school became a four-year college. Cameron left in 1960 and returned to the Oklahoma Junior College Conference. The Pioneer Conference disbanded in 1961. The league's final competition was a track meet held on April 29 of that year, in Stephenville, Texas.

== Yearly football standings ==
1950 Pioneer Conference (junior college) football standings
	Conf.					Overall
Team	W		L		T	W		L		T
San Angelo $	3	–	0	–	0	8	–	2	–	0
Tarleton State	2	–	1	–	0	7	–	3	–	0
Schreiner	1	–	2	–	0	7	–	3	–	0
Arlington State	0	–	3	–	0	1	–	7	–	2
$ – Conference champion

1951 Pioneer Conference (junior college) football standings
	Conf.					Overall
Team	W		L		T	W		L		T
San Angelo $	4	–	0	–	0	6	–	3	–	0
Schreiner	2	–	2	–	0	6	–	4	–	0
Arlington State	1	–	2	–	1	4	–	4	–	1
Tarleton State	1	–	2	–	1	3	–	5	–	1
Ranger	1	–	3	–	0	4	–	6	–	0
$ – Conference champion

1952 Pioneer Conference (junior college) football standings
	Conf.					Overall
Team	W		L		T	W		L		T
Arlington State $	3	–	0	–	1	8	–	1	–	1
Tarleton State	2	–	2	–	0	6	–	3	–	0
Schreiner	2	–	2	–	0	5	–	4	–	1
Ranger	1	–	2	–	1	6	–	3	–	1
San Angelo	1	–	3	–	0	5	–	4	–	0
$ – Conference champion

1953 Pioneer Conference (junior college) football standings
	Conf.					Overall
Team	W		L		T	W		L		T
Arlington State $	4	–	0	–	0	8	–	1	–	0
Tarleton State	2	–	2	–	0	3	–	6	–	0
Schreiner	1	–	2	–	1	5	–	3	–	1
Ranger	1	–	2	–	1	4	–	4	–	2
San Angelo	1	–	3	–	0	5	–	5	–	0
$ – Conference champion

1954 Pioneer Conference (junior college) football standings
	Conf.					Overall
Team	W		L		T	W		L		T
Tarleton State $	3	–	0	–	1	5	–	3	–	1
San Angelo	2	–	1	–	1	5	–	3	–	1
Arlington State	2	–	2	–	0	8	–	2	–	0
Ranger	2	–	2	–	0	6	–	3	–	0
Schreiner	0	–	4	–	0	3	–	7	–	0
$ – Conference champion

1955 Pioneer Conference (junior college) football standings
	Conf.					Overall
Team	W		L		T	W		L		T
San Angelo $	4	–	0	–	0	8	–	2	–	0
Arlington State	3	–	1	–	0	7	–	3	–	0
Tarleton State	1	–	3	–	0	5	–	4	–	0
Ranger	1	–	3	–	0	4	–	5	–	0
Schreiner	1	–	3	–	0	3	–	6	–	0
$ – Conference champion

1956 Pioneer Conference (junior college) standings
	Conf.					Overall
Team	W		L		T	W		L		T
San Angelo +	3	–	1	–	0	8	–	1	–	0
Arlington State +	3	–	1	–	0	9	–	1	–	1
Tarleton State +	3	–	1	–	0	7	–	1	–	1
Ranger	1	–	3	–	0	2	–	8	–	0
Schreiner	0	–	4	–	0	2	–	6	–	1
+ – Conference co-champions

1957 Pioneer Conference (junior college) football standings
	Conf.					Overall
Team	W		L		T	W		L		T
Arlington State $	4	–	0	–	0	12	–	0	–	0
Cameron	3	–	1	–	0	8	–	3	–	0
San Angelo	2	–	2	–	0	4	–	5	–	1
Tarleton State	1	–	3	–	0	2	–	7	–	0
Ranger	0	–	4	–	0	0	–	8	–	0
$ – Conference champion

1958 Pioneer Conference (junior college) football standings
	Conf.					Overall
Team	W		L		T	W		L		T
Wharton $	6	–	0	–	0	8	–	3	–	0
Del Mar	4	–	1	–	1	8	–	2	–	1
Arlington State	4	–	1	–	1	7	–	2	–	1
San Angelo	2	–	4	–	0	5	–	5	–	0
Cameron	2	–	4	–	0	4	–	6	–	0
Victoria	2	–	4	–	0	4	–	6	–	0
Tarleton State	0	–	6	–	0	1	–	9	–	0
$ – Conference champion

1959 Pioneer Conference (junior college) football standings
	Conf.					Overall
Team	W		L		T	W		L		T
Del Mar $	5	–	0	–	0	8	–	1	–	1
Victoria	4	–	1	–	0	8	–	2	–	0
Wharton	3	–	2	–	0	5	–	4	–	1
Cameron	2	–	3	–	0	4	–	5	–	0
San Angelo	1	–	4	–	0	4	–	5	–	0
Tarleton State	0	–	5	–	0	1	–	8	–	0
$ – Conference champion

1960 Pioneer Conference (junior college) football standings
	Conf.					Overall
Team	W		L		T	W		L		T
Del Mar $	3	–	0	–	1	8	–	0	–	1
San Angelo	3	–	1	–	0	7	–	3	–	0
Wharton	2	–	2	–	0	6	–	3	–	1
Tarleton State	1	–	3	–	0	5	–	4	–	0
Victoria	0	–	3	–	1	5	–	4	–	1
$ – Conference champion
