= Granger High School (Granger, Texas) =

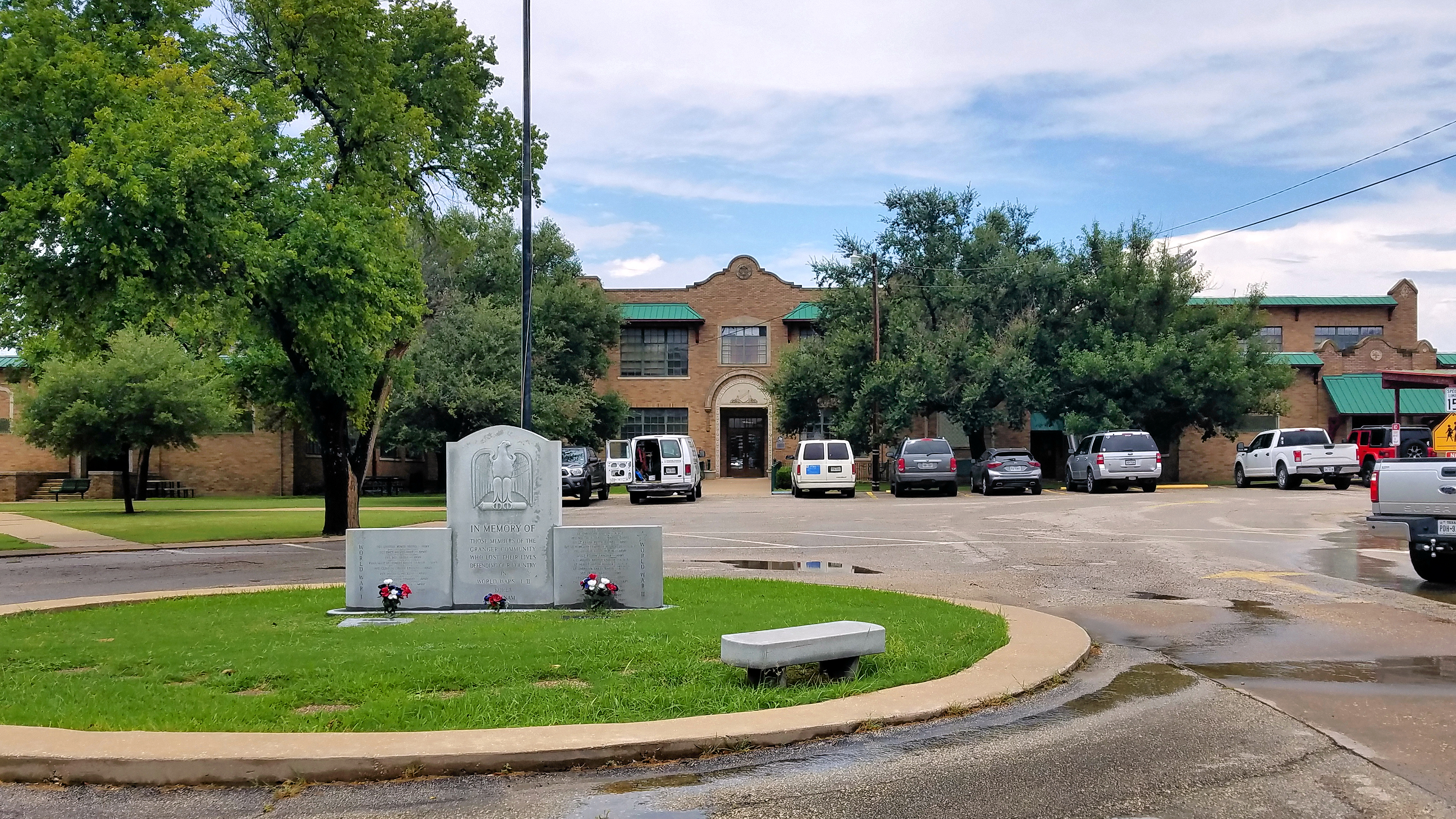

Location
- 300 North Colorado Street; Granger, Texas 76530; United States; 30.719559°N 97.436377°W

Information
- School type: Public high school
- Founded: 1887
- School district: Granger Independent School District
- Principal: Stephen Brosch
- Teaching staff: 48.75 (FTE)
- Grades: PK-12
- Enrollment: 188 (2025–2026)
- Student to teacher ratio: 11.51
- Colors: Purple & Gold
- Athletics conference: UIL Class 2A
- Mascot: Lion
- Rival: Bartlett High School (Texas)
- Website: www.grangerisd.net/page/jr-sr-high

Granger High School is a former public high school located in Granger, Texas. It is operated by the Granger Independent School District, which is located in Williamson County, Texas. A new secondary school campus opened March 2026 for the district’s junior high and high school students. The former Granger High School campus is being renovated and upgraded to expand early childhood learning and elementary school capacity to accommodate district growth.

== Demographics ==
The demographic breakdown of the 188 students enrolled for the 2025-2026 school year was:

- Male - 52%
- Female - 48%
- White - 49.6%
- Hispanic - 46.0%
- Two or More Races - 2.1%
- Black - 1.2%
- Asian - 0.5%
- Native Hawaiian/Pacific Islander - 0.4%
- American Indian/Alaska Native - 0.2%

== Athletics ==
=== Sports ===
Granger High School participates in the following sports:

- Baseball
- Basketball
- Cheerleading
- Cross Country
- Football
- Powerlifting
- Softball
- Tennis
- Track & Field
- Volleyball

=== State Titles ===
- Football -
  - 1997(1A)
- Girls Track -
  - 2004(1A)

=== Coaches ===
A list of the 2023-2024 Granger High School coaches:

- Athletic Director - Gaston McDorman
  - Head Football
- Girls Coordinator - Jolene Volek
  - Asst. HS Volleyball, Asst. HS Girls Basketball, Asst. HS Softball
- Margie Burton
  - Head HS Volleyball, JH Girls Basketball, Head HS/JH Tennis
- Kendall Cotten
  - Asst. HS/JH Cross Country, Head HS Girls Basketball, Head HS/JH Girls Track
- Brenten Drummond
  - Asst. HS/JH Football, Head HS Boys Powerlifting, Asst. HS/JH Boys Track
- Jennifer Fudge
  - JH Volleyball, JH Girls Basketball, Head HS Softball
- Ryan Gonzales
  - Asst. HS/JH Football, JH Boys Basketball (8th), Asst. HS Baseball
- Eric Johnson
  - Asst. HS/JH Football, JH Boys Basketball (7th), Head HS/JH Boys Track
- Shelby Johnson
  - Head HS/JH Cross Country, Head HS Girls Powerlifting, Asst. HS/JH Girls Track
- Chaston Kubacak
  - Asst. HS/JH Football, Head HS Boys Basketball, Asst. HS/JH Boys Track
- Kody Kuhl
  - Asst. HS/JH Football, Head HS Baseball
- Randa Perez
  - JH Volleyball, Asst. HS/JH Girls Track
- Peyton Rathke
  - Asst. HS/JH Football, Asst. HS Boys Basketball, Asst. HS/JH Boys Track
- Pedro Rivera
  - Asst. HS Boys Basketball
- Kenzie Thomas
  - Asst. HS Volleyball, Asst. HS Girls Basketball, Asst. HS/JH Tennis

== Extra-Curriculars ==
=== Extra-Curriculars ===
Granger High School has the following extra-curriculars:

- FCCLA - Family, Career, and Community Leaders of America
- FFA - Future Farmers of America
- FCA - Fellowship of Christian Athletes
- NHS - National Honor Society
- HS/JH Student Council
- UIL Academics
- UIL Theatre
- The Locker
