= Granger, Texas =

- City
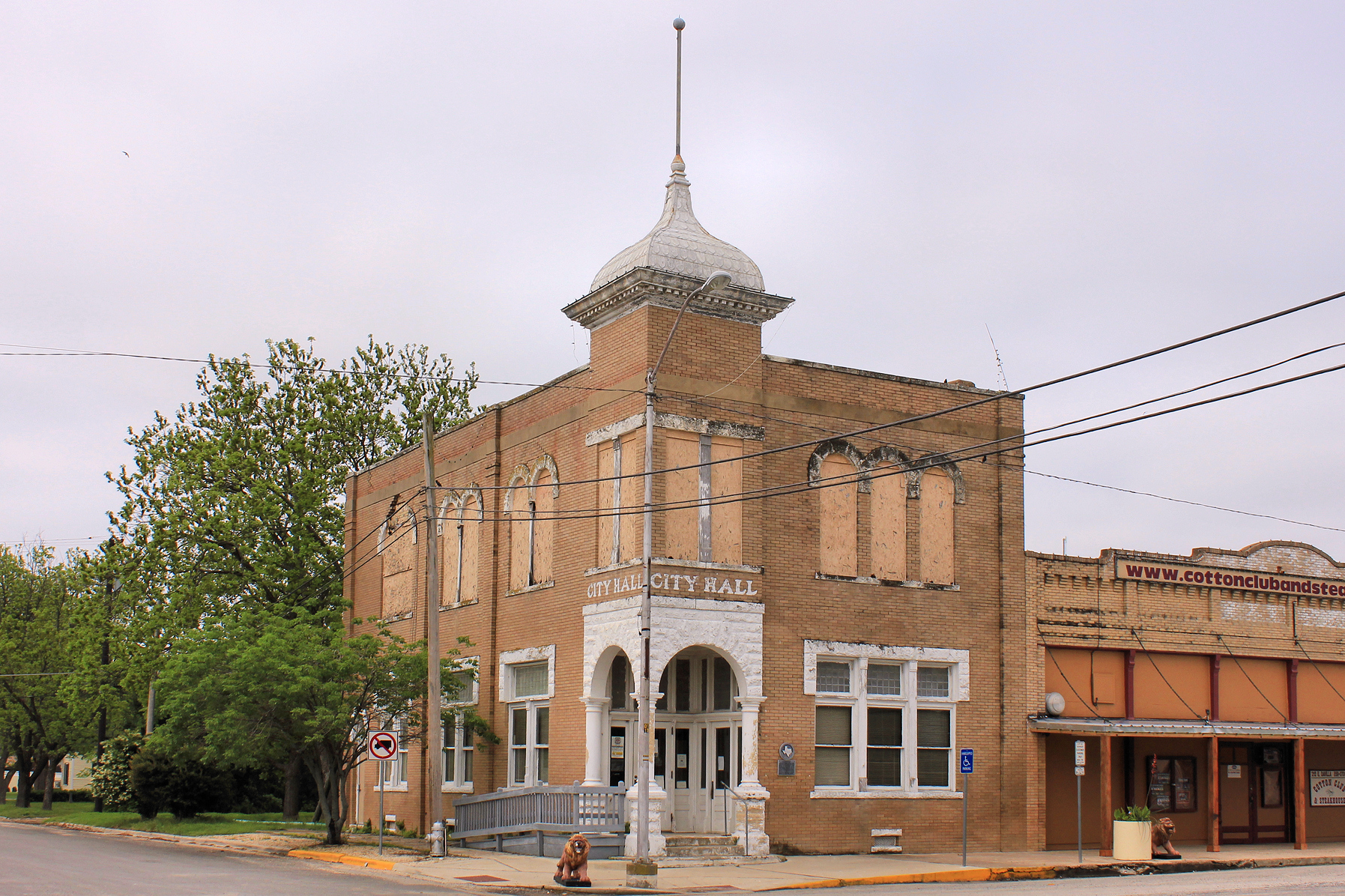
- City Hall

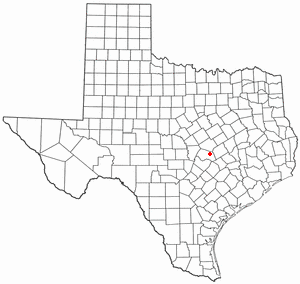
- Location of Granger, Texas

- Coordinates: 30°43′5″N 97°26′28″W
- Country: United States
- State: Texas
- County: Williamson

Area
  - Total: 0.67 sq mi (1.73 km^{2})
  - Land: 0.67 sq mi (1.73 km^{2})
  - Water: 0 sq mi (0.00 km^{2})
- Elevation: 577 ft (176 m)

Population (2020)
  - Total: 1,183
  - Density: 2,256.8/sq mi (871.37/km^{2})
- Time zone: UTC-6 (Central (CST))
  - Summer (DST): UTC-5 (CDT)
- ZIP code: 76530
- Area code(s): 512 & 737
- FIPS code: 48-30548
- GNIS feature ID: 1358264
- Website: grangertx.us

Granger is a city in Williamson County, Texas, United States. It was incorporated in 1891. The population was 1,183 at the 2020 census.

== History ==
In the late 19th century, Granger was one of the centers of the large Moravian Czech immigrant population in Texas. This Czech Texan heritage is evidenced by the historic Catholic Church, Czech Brethren Church, and SPJST hall. Jno P. Trlica, the son of a Moravian immigrant, set up a photography business here. His photos offer a rare look into the places and people of Granger in the early 20th century.

== Geography ==
Granger is located 36 mi (58 km) northeast of Austin. Granger Lake is located east of the city.

According to the United States Census Bureau, the city has a total area of 0.7 square mile (1.7 km^{2}), all land.

== Demographics ==
Historical population
Census	Pop.	Note	%±
1890	261		—
1900	841		222.2%
1910	1,708		103.1%
1920	1,944		13.8%
1930	1,703		−12.4%
1940	1,723		1.2%
1950	1,637		−5.0%
1960	1,339		−18.2%
1970	1,256		−6.2%
1980	1,236		−1.6%
1990	1,190		−3.7%
2000	1,299		9.2%
2010	1,419		9.2%
2020	1,183		−16.6%
U.S. Decennial Census

=== 2020 census ===
As of the 2020 census, Granger had a population of 1,183. The median age was 40.3 years. 22.9% of residents were under the age of 18 and 18.7% of residents were 65 years of age or older. For every 100 females there were 98.5 males, and for every 100 females age 18 and over there were 99.1 males age 18 and over.

0.0% of residents lived in urban areas, while 100.0% lived in rural areas.

There were 487 households in Granger, of which 29.8% had children under the age of 18 living in them. Of all households, 39.6% were married-couple households, 22.6% were households with a male householder and no spouse or partner present, and 32.0% were households with a female householder and no spouse or partner present. About 30.4% of all households were made up of individuals and 14.3% had someone living alone who was 65 years of age or older.

There were 550 housing units, of which 11.5% were vacant. The homeowner vacancy rate was 0.9% and the rental vacancy rate was 12.6%.

Racial composition as of the 2020 census
Race	Number	Percent
White	707	59.8%
Black or African American	83	7.0%
American Indian and Alaska Native	9	0.8%
Asian	1	0.1%
Native Hawaiian and Other Pacific Islander	2	0.2%
Some other race	160	13.5%
Two or more races	221	18.7%
Hispanic or Latino (of any race)	447	37.8%

=== 2010 census ===
As of the census of 2010, there were 1,419 people, 502 households, and 323 families residing in the city. The population density was 1,951.6 inhabitants per square mile (753.5/km^{2}). There were 565 housing units at an average density of 848.8 per square mile (327.7/km^{2}). The racial makeup of the city was 81.37% White, 8.55% African American, 0.31% Native American, 0.31% Asian, 0.08% Pacific Islander, 8.47% from other races, and 0.92% from two or more races. Hispanic or Latino of any race were 25.40% of the population.

There were 502 households, out of which 35.7% had children under the age of 18 living with them, 49.4% were married couples living together, 11.2% had a female householder with no husband present, and 35.5% were non-families. 33.5% of all households were made up of individuals, and 19.7% had someone living alone who was 65 years of age or older. The average household size was 2.48 and the average family size was 3.20.

In the city, the population was spread out, with 27.0% under the age of 18, 7.8% from 18 to 24, 25.5% from 25 to 44, 18.9% from 45 to 64, and 20.9% who were 65 years of age or older. The median age was 37 years. For every 100 females, there were 89.6 males. For every 100 females age 18 and over, there were 85.9 males.

The median income for a household in the city was $32,542, and the median income for a family was $37,188. Males had a median income of $30,000 versus $21,250 for females. The per capita income for the city was $12,254. About 11.5% of families and 12.0% of the population were below the poverty line, including 12.6% of those under age 18 and 21.3% of those age 65 or over.

== Education ==
The City of Granger is served by the Granger Independent School District. It is home of the Granger Lions.

== Climate ==
The climate in this area is characterized by hot, humid summers and generally mild to cool winters. According to the Köppen Climate Classification system, Granger has a humid subtropical climate, abbreviated "Cfa" on climate maps.
