= Del Mar College =

Community college in Corpus Christi, Texas

Coordinates: 27.763°N 97.411°W

- Type: Public community college
- Established: 1935
- President: Mark Escamilla
- Faculty: 479 (fall 2022)
- Students: 9,725 (fall 2022)
- Location: Corpus Christi, Texas, United States
- Campus: Urban, 330 acres (1.3 km^{2})
- Website: www.delmar.edu

Del Mar College (DMC) is a public community college in Corpus Christi, Texas. Founded in 1935, DMC encompasses three primary campuses and one campus annex.

As defined by the Texas Legislature, the official service area of DMC is the following:

- all of Aransas, Kenedy, Nueces, and San Patricio counties,
- the Calallen, Corpus Christi, Flour Bluff, Tuloso-Midway, and West Oso school districts, and any area located outside those districts that is within the municipality of Corpus Christi, and
- the Riviera Independent School District.

Del Mar College was originally called Corpus Christi Junior College (CCJC) until taking on its current name in 1948.

== History ==
Del Mar College was established in 1935 as Corpus Christi Junior College before adopting its current name in 1945. Since its founding, it has gone from a small college to a community college by expanding technical education, health sciences, and career-focused training opportunities.

In 2021, Del Mar College launched its first bachelor's degree program, a Bachelor of Science in Nursing. The following year, the college began offering classes at its new Oso Creek Campus. The campus's STEM and Culinary Arts Buildings were operational by August 29, 2022, and in January 2023, the campus became fully operational after the voter approval of a $139 million bond package that funded its construction.

== Campuses ==
Del Mar College operates three main campuses in Corpus Christi, The Heritage Campus, Windward Campus, and the Oso Creek Campus, alongside many online learning programs. Together, the campuses and online programs help support the college's mission of providing accessible education throughout the Coastal Bend Region.

The Heritage Campus, is located on Baldwin Boulevard, and houses classroom and laboratory facilities, performing art venues. Additionally, it offers many liberal arts programs, and programs in Arts & Science and Business.

The Windward Campus, is located on the Old Brownsville Rd, and is home to many of the college's career, industrial and technical education programs. It is also the campus who offered the college's first bachelor's degree program RN to BSN. This campus provides students with more hands-on experiences as it trains its students for industry-level work.

The construction of the Oso Creek Campus began following the vote approval of $139 million bond referendum in 2012. It is situated on a 96-acre site at Yorktown Boulevard and Rodd Field Road, and fully became operational in January 2023, making it the first new campus that Del Mar built in 60 years. The campus was designed for students interested in STEM programs such as architecture and biosciences and has modern laboratories, library resources, and advanced technology too facilitate learning.

== Academics ==
Accredited by the Southern Association of Colleges and Schools, DMC offers Associate in Arts and Associate in Science degrees in 43 university transfer majors and Associate in Applied Science degrees, enhanced skills certificates and certificates of achievement in more than 108 occupational fields.

Students can take courses using special scheduling options that include weekend, online, videoconferencing, short-semester courses and Rapid Track, an accelerated program that allows students to complete an Associate in Arts degree in one year.

Additionally, 52% of tenure-track faculty hold a master's degree or higher and 31% hold a doctoral degree. The student faculty ratio at DMC is 11.48:1 as of fall 2022.

A $108 million public bond package has allowed extensive renovation and expansion of Del Mar College East and West, along with the development of the DMC Annex that houses the Center for Economic Development. Both noncredit and credit students have access to classes, laboratories and the latest technology that upgrade their current skills, prepare them for further study or train them for immediate employment in the Coastal Bend area.

Del Mar College's Nursing Program has one of the largest nursing clinical simulation labs in the nation, including over 30 patient mannequins with programmable vital signs, EKG monitoring, and voice entry. The program is accredited by the Accreditation Commission for Education in Nursing (ACEN).

During a period from 2009 to 2011, the passing rate of students taking the National Council Licensure Examination-Registered Nurse (NCLEX-RN) for the first time fell below 80 percent, and the program was placed on "conditional approval status" by the accreditation commission. The program strengthened admission criteria and temporarily closed admitting new students to the Registered Nurse Education program until the examination pass rate for current students increased to above 80 percent. The program produced a passing rate of 96% for 2012 and 90% for 2013.

== Students ==
Del Mar College serves students from Corpus Christi and the surrounding Coastal Ben Region through for-credit and continuing education as well as other programs. According to the college, in 2025 the institution enrolled more than 20,000 students a year in both credit and non-credit courses.

The student body is mainly made up of Hispanic and first-generation college students. In 2024, it was made up of 71% Hispanic, 20.4% White, and 2% African American students. The student body reflects the demographics of South Texas, as Hispanics are the majority in the South Texas Region.

== Athletics ==
In the 1950s, Del Mar College fielded a nationally-ranked football program. The 1951 Del Mar Vikings football team earned a 9–1 record, won the South Texas Conference championship, and was ranked in the Litkenhous Ratings as the 86th best college football team in the country. However due to financial costs, the football team had to be dropped. Now, the college has a sports program called the Intramural Sports Program. The program consists of activities for its staff and students such as the color run, fitness challenges, and team sports.

== Notable alumni ==
- Henry Cuesta, an American-born musician and clarinetist with The Lawrence Welk Show.
- Solomon P. Ortiz, former U.S. Representative for Texas's 27th congressional district.
- Pepe Serna, American actor known for roles in Scarface and Car Wash.
- Raul Torres, state representative from Nueces County
