= Victoria College (Texas) =

Community college in Victoria, Texas, US

Coordinates: 28°49′1″N 96°58′45.5″W

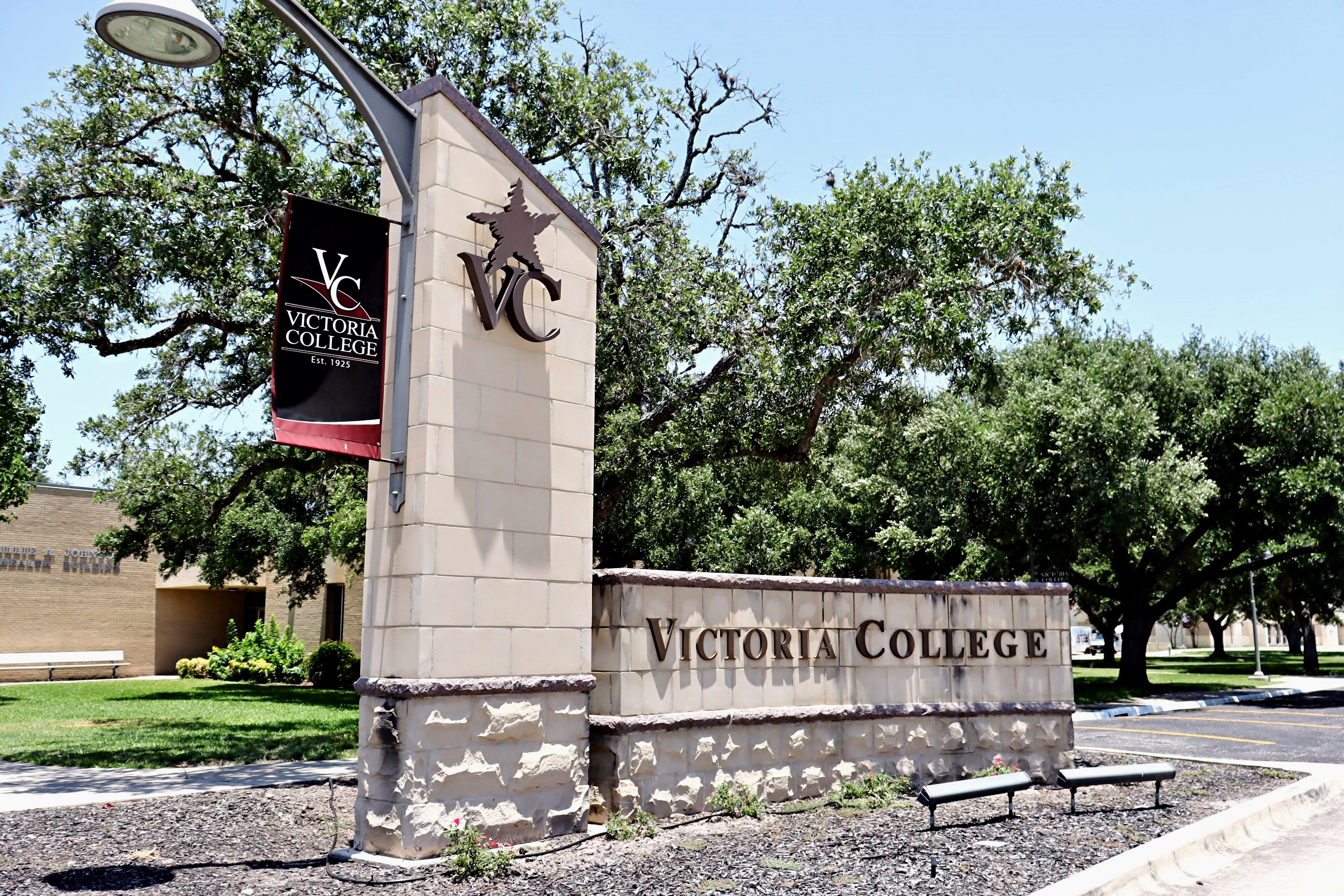
- Former name: Victoria Junior College
- Type: Public community college
- Established: February 4, 1925; 101 years ago
- Students: 6,200
- Location: Victoria, Texas, United States
- Campus: suburban
- Website: www.victoriacollege.edu

Victoria College (VC) is a public community college in Victoria, Texas. The college first began classes in the Patti Welder High School on February 4, 1925. After World War II, because of the growth of the surrounding area and the college population from returning GIs, the college built its own campus and changed its name from the Victoria Junior College to Victoria College. The college shares some facilities with Texas A&M University-Victoria.

Victoria College now serves approximately 6,200 students each year through education and training. It is designated by the US Department of Education as a Hispanic-Serving Institution (HSI).

== Service area ==
As defined by the Texas Legislature, the official service area of Victoria College includes:

- Calhoun, DeWitt, Gonzales, Lavaca, and Victoria Counties
- Jackson County, except the territory within the Ganado Independent School District
- Refugio County, except the territory within the Woodsboro Independent School District

== Student life ==
Victoria College offers more than 20 student clubs and organizations.

The VC Pirates men's basketball and women's volleyball teams compete at the NJCAA Division I level.

== History ==
Victoria College was established as a part of the Victoria Independent School District in 1925, making it one of the oldest community colleges in Texas. Classes were initially held on the third floor of the Patti Welder High School with 51 students enrolling that first semester.

In Sept. 1949, Victoria College moved to its present-day Main Campus on Red River Street and constructed four buildings that year. Nearly a century later, VC has expanded to include 16 buildings on its 60-acre Main Campus, the Zelda L. Allen School of Nursing in Hallettsville (1984), the Museum of the Coastal Bend located on the Main Campus (2003); the Gonzales Center in Gonzales (2006), the Leo J. Welder Center for the Performing Arts in downtown Victoria (2012), and the Emerging Technology Complex on Lone Tree Road (2015).

Over the years, Victoria College has opened new locations; underwent several name changes; expanded its workforce training, adult education, and dual enrollment offerings; and evolved into a community college that now serves approximately 6,200 students each year through education and training.

== Notable alumni ==
- Joseph L. Galloway, newspaper correspondent and columnist
- Jim Lehrer, journalist
- Geanie Morrison, member of the Texas House of Representatives from District 30 since 1999; includes Victoria County
- Toni Marek, author and whistleblower
